= Controversies surrounding Jair Bolsonaro =

Controversies involving former Brazilian President Jair Bolsonaro

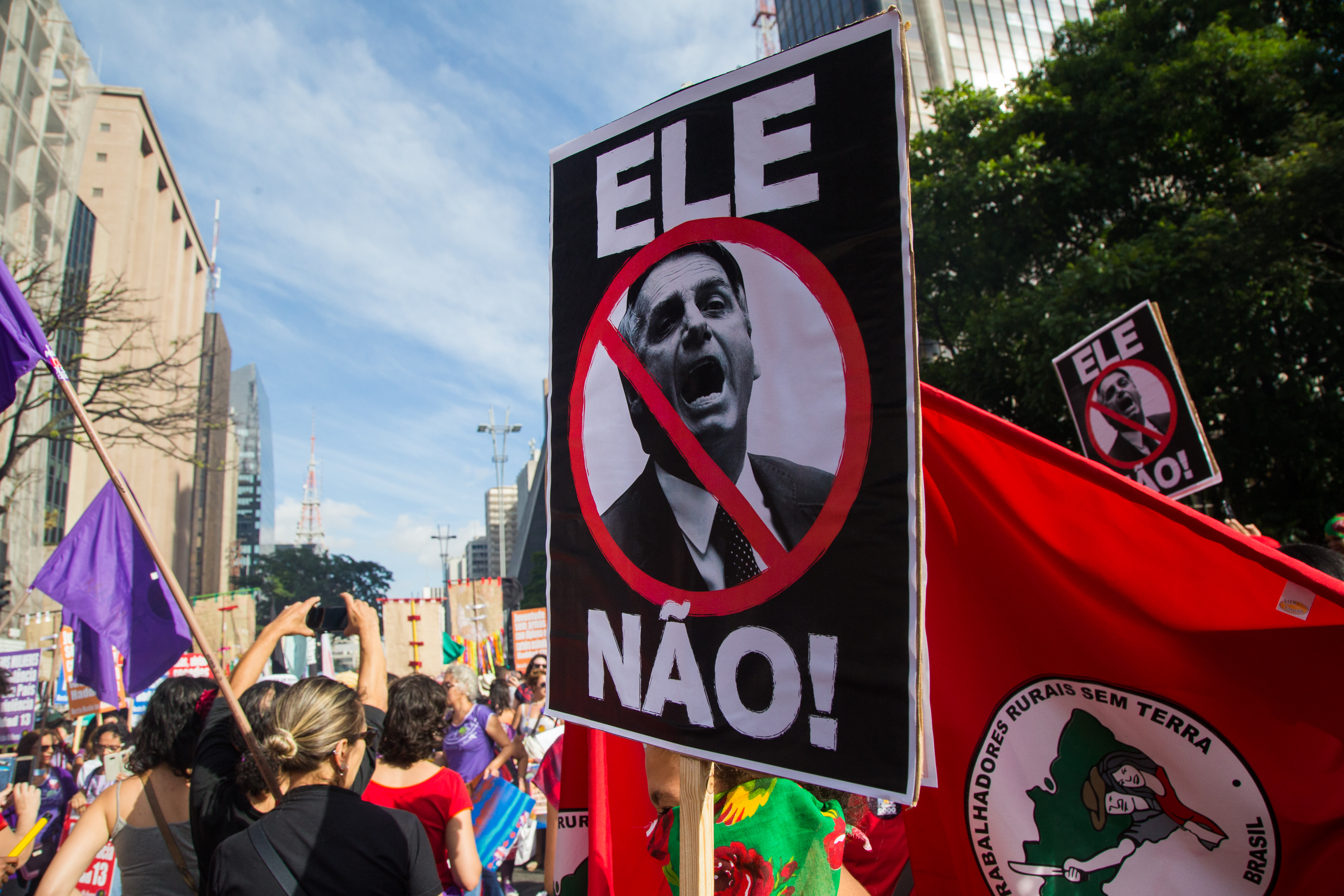
Poster symbolizing the Ele Não Movement.

Among the main controversies surrounding Jair Bolsonaro are his right-wing populist position, his criticism of the political left, his classification of torture as a legitimate practice, his opposition to LGBT rights and several other questionable statements, which have led to 30 calls for his impeachment and three court convictions. Several international organizations consider that his authoritarian tendencies threaten to cause irreparable harm to civil society, the press, Afro-Brazilians, indigenous people and critics of the government. Bolsonaro also has a hostile relationship with the press and has been accused of proliferating fake news.

Although his statements are classified on the far-right of the political perspective, Bolsonaro rejects such categorization. On March 12, 1999, he spoke in the Chamber of Deputies to praise Federal Deputy Luiza Erundina, a member of the Brazilian Socialist Party (PSB) and recognized as a left-wing figure. After the 2002 elections, he announced his vote for Luiz Inácio Lula da Silva (PT) in the second round, although he had supported Ciro Gomes (then affiliated to the PPS) in the first round.

His statements have been described as hate speech, homophobic, misogynistic, sexist, racist and anti-refugee. In August 2018, the British magazine The Economist described him as a "radical", a "religious nationalist", a "right-wing demagogue", an "apologist for dictators" and a "threat to democracy".

Bolsonaro often defends Brazil's military dictatorship. During an argument with demonstrators in December 2008, he declared that "the mistake of the dictatorship was to torture and not to kill." He has been criticized by the media, politicians and the Torture Never Again group, especially after he posted a poster on his office door telling relatives of those who disappeared during the military dictatorship that "those who look for bones are dogs". During the COVID-19 pandemic, Bolsonaro spread disinformation and made statements contrary to the recommendations of health agencies, besides carrying out several public activities.

== Operation Dead End ==
On October 27, 1987, Jair Bolsonaro reported on the Operation Dead End to reporter Cássia Maria from Veja magazine. He supported an improvement in pay and opposed the arrest of Captain Saldon Pereira Filho. The aim of the operation was to explode low-powered bombs in toilets at the Agulhas Negras Military Academy, in Resende, and in military barracks in order to protest against the low salaries that military personnel were receiving.

Bolsonaro allegedly drew a sketch of where the bomb would be installed in the Guandu Pipeline, which supplies water to the municipality of Rio de Janeiro. Veja handed the material over to the Minister of the Army, Leônidas Pires Gonçalves, who, after four months of investigation, concluded that the report was correct and that the captains had lied. Unanimously, on April 19, 1988, the Military Justification Council (CJM) ruled that Bolsonaro was guilty and that "his incompatibility for the rank of officer and consequent loss of rank be declared". In his defense, Bolsonaro said that Veja magazine had published fraudulent accusations in order to sell more with sensationalist articles.

The case was submitted to the Superior Military Court (STM). The trial was held in June 1988 and the court accepted the thesis of Bolsonaro's and Captain Fábio Passos da Silva's defense, which claimed that the documentary evidence was insufficient because it did not allow for handwriting comparisons, since block letters had been used. They used the strategy of presenting four reports instead of the two required by the system, leading the justices to make a technical mistake in their verdicts. The STM acquitted the two officers, who were kept in the army. In the same year, Bolsonaro went into the military reserve with the rank of captain and began his political career, running for councillor in Rio de Janeiro. Later, the Army Police report was disproved by the Federal Police, which confirmed Bolsonaro's handwriting.

== Corruption ==
In December 2020, Jair Bolsonaro was named "Person of the Year" by the Organized Crime and Corruption Reporting Project (OCCRP), an international consortium of investigative journalists. According to the organization, Bolsonaro has "surrounded himself with corrupt figures, used propaganda to promote his populist agenda, undermined the justice system, and waged a destructive war against the Amazon region that has enriched some of the country's worst land owners."

=== Assets ===
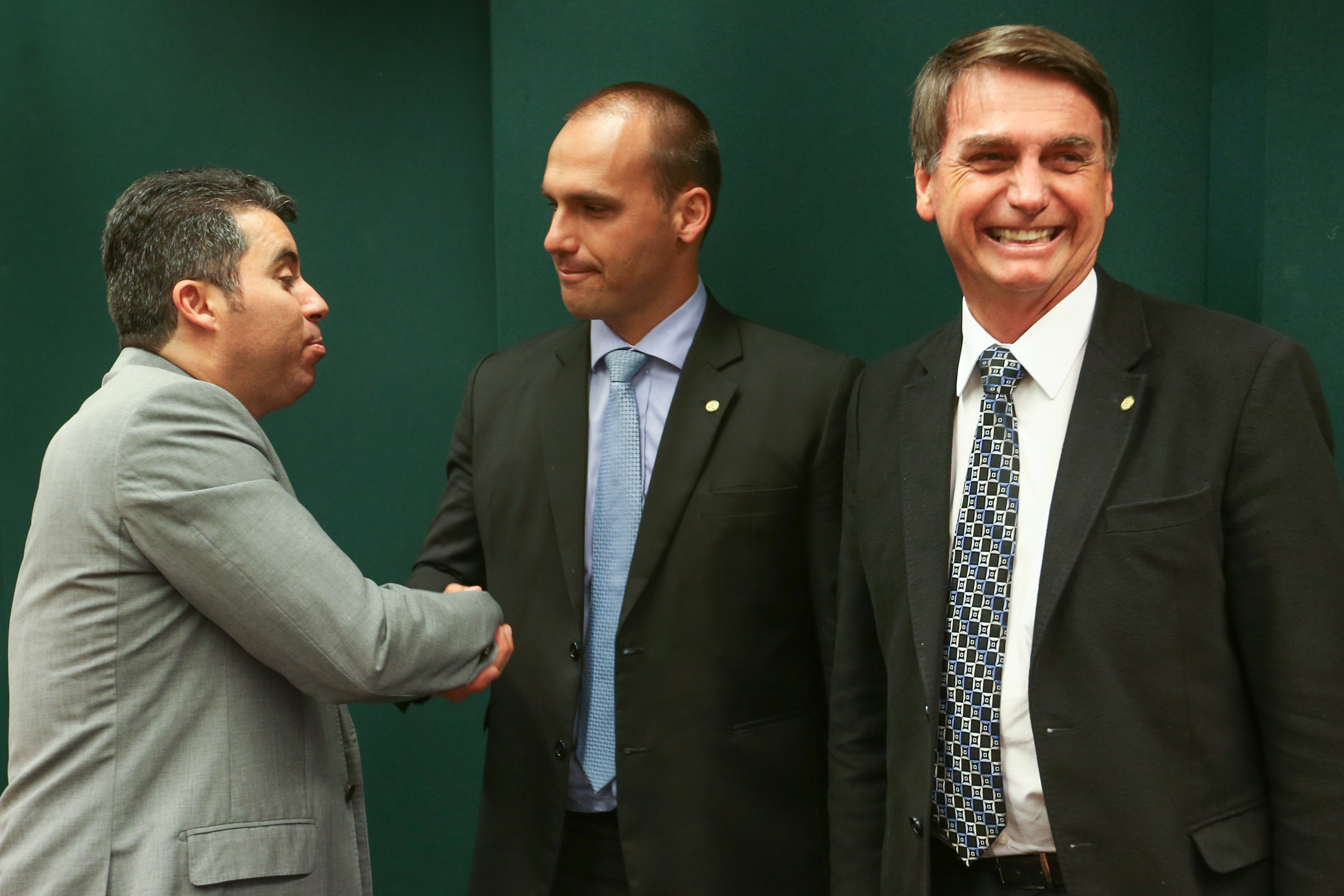
Deputy Marcos Rogério greets Eduardo Bolsonaro next to his father Jair Bolsonaro.

Between 2010 and 2014, Jair Bolsonaro's assets grew by more than 150% according to the declaration filed with the Superior Electoral Court (TSE). During this period, he acquired five properties worth a combined R$8 million, including two houses in Rio de Janeiro bought for R$500,000 and R$400,000, respectively, figures considerably lower than those evaluated at the time. The Federal Council of Real Estate Brokers (Cofeci) claims to have evidence that the purchase operation involved money laundering. According to the Electoral Justice, he owns cars worth up to R$105,000, a jet-ski and financial investments worth R$1.7 million. When he entered politics in 1989, Bolsonaro declared that he had a Fiat Panorama and two plots of land in Resende, valued at R$10,000. Until 2008, he and his children declared assets of about R$1 million, reaching R$15 million in 2017. As a congressman, he earned a salary of R$25,000, plus a Brazilian Army salary of R$5,700. In his defense, Bolsonaro claimed that Rodrigo Janot, former Prosecutor General of the Republic, had filed an anonymous complaint about his declaration of assets in 2014 and that the accusations were "slanderous" and part of a "campaign to assassinate his reputation".

Bolsonaro has also received a housing allowance of about R$3,000 from the Chamber of Deputies since 1995, despite owning a two-bedroom apartment in Brasilia since 1998. A report on the Vice website raised the issue in March 2017 due to the repercussions of Operation Weak Meat. Bolsonaro posted a video on his YouTube channel explaining that the R$200,000, half of the amount spent on his campaign, was returned as a "donation to the party". However, the TSE spreadsheet revealed that the amount was transferred back to Bolsonaro's account, but now as a donation from the party fund.

In April 2017, Bolsonaro was indicted for using his parliamentary quota to pay for trips around Brazil to present himself as a pre-candidate for the presidency in 2018. According to the Chamber's rules on the use of the quota, no expenses of an electoral nature will be allowed. Between 2016 and 2017, at least six of his trips were funded by the Chamber for a total of R$22,000. His press office denied that he was campaigning and claimed that the use of the travel quota was related to his participation in the Chamber's Public Security Committee, on which he is an alternate.

On April 7, 2020, the Agência Sportlight revealed invoices showing that Bolsonaro, when he was a member of parliament, overbilled for the reimbursement of public fuel funds. At the end of the month, Minister Luiz Fux of the Supreme Federal Court (STF) sent a criminal complaint to the Public Prosecutor's Office (PGR) against Jair Bolsonaro. Criminal lawyer Sidney Duran Gonzalez filed the complaint.

=== Nepotism ===
In December 2017, the newspaper O Globo reported that Bolsonaro and his children employed one of his ex-wives and two of her relatives in public positions in their offices. According to the newspaper, they occupied the positions from 1998 onwards. However, as the hirings took place before 2008, when the Supreme Federal Court (STF) standardized the rules against nepotism, they cannot legally be classified in this way.

A report in Folha de S. Paulo in January 2018 revealed that Bolsonaro had hired a ghost servant in Brasilia. According to the article, between January and June, Walderice Santos da Conceição received more than R$17,000 as an employee of his office in the Chamber of Deputies, but worked as an açaí vendor in the municipality of Angra dos Reis, in Rio de Janeiro. She had been one of his 14 employees since 2003, earning a salary of R$1,416.33. In August 2018, Bolsonaro announced that Walderice had resigned from her job as an advisor and commented: "She has two dogs there and in order not to die she occasionally gives the dogs water, that's all. That's her crime, giving water to the dogs".

=== Ana Cristina Valle ===
In September 2018, Veja magazine published an article detailing a 500-page lawsuit filed by ex-wife Ana Cristina Siqueira Valle against Bolsonaro. In the document, filed in April 2008 with the 1st Family Court of Rio de Janeiro in the midst of a contentious separation, Ana Cristina made several accusations against Bolsonaro, including: hiding assets from the Electoral Justice in the 2006 election, incompatibility of income with his monthly earnings and theft of cash and jewelry from a safe at a Banco do Brasil branch. Following the allegations, the Federal Revenue Service opened an investigation in 2008, but found no irregularities. After the publication of the report, Bolsonaro sent a request to the Public Prosecutor's Office of Rio de Janeiro asking that issue 2602 of Veja magazine be withdrawn from circulation. It also asked for an investigation into how the article accessed a case that had been archived and was kept secret from the courts. Ana Cristina later claimed to have lied to the courts in her testimony.

=== Slush fund ===
On October 19, 2018, the Superior Electoral Court (TSE), following a request from the Workers' Party (PT), launched an investigation based on a report in the Folha de S. Paulo newspaper, which claimed that companies paid up to R$12 million in contracts for the mass sending of fake news against Luiz Inácio Lula da Silva on the WhatsApp app to favor Bolsonaro's presidential campaign. Bolsonaro's defense says he has been falsely accused and would take the appropriate legal measures. According to the PT, the act consisted of the practice of slush fund.

In a 1999 interview with a program on Rede Bandeirantes, Bolsonaro said: "My advice and I do it: I withhold everything possible." His name is registered on the Furnas List, a corruption scheme that used illegal money to finance 156 political campaigns in 2000. Although he claims that the list is fake, its authenticity has been proven by a Federal Police report. In the Consultation of Candidate Campaign Donors and Suppliers, on the website of the Superior Electoral Court (TSE), Bolsonaro's name also appears as a recipient of R$200,000 from the company JBS during his campaign in 2014. That year, Bolsonaro was re-elected federal deputy with the highest number of votes in Rio de Janeiro and received more than 460,000 votes.

In 2016, Bolsonaro opposed an amendment articulated mainly by parties and parliamentarians involved in Operation Car Wash to give amnesty to crimes of slush fund. On October 7, 2020, he announced the end of the operation, claiming that there was no corruption in his government. Carlos Fernando dos Santos Lima, a former member of the operation, stated on social media that Bolsonaro is one of those responsible for ending the operation by making a political alliance with "Renans, Maias, Aras, Toffolis and Gilmares, and all of them, hand in hand around the great national accord, decided to save the rotten and nefarious system of political corruption. Bolsonaro is a shameful fraud".

=== Queiroz case ===
In 2019, the Public Prosecutor's Office of Rio de Janeiro opened an investigation into the possible money laundering and concealment of assets of former parliamentary advisor Fabrício Queiroz and Senator Flávio Bolsonaro. According to the bank responsible for the account, the financial transactions were incompatible with Queiroz's assets, economic activity or professional occupation and financial capacity. During the period, at least eight employees of Flávio Bolsonaro's office made deposits totaling R$150,000 into Queiroz's account on dates after their salaries had been paid. The operations raised suspicions that Bolsonaro was misappropriating part of the salaries of civil servants in the illegal practice known as "rachadinha". One of Queiroz's transactions mentioned in the report is a check for R$24,000 issued in favor of First Lady Michelle Bolsonaro, which Jair Bolsonaro justified as payment for a R$40,000 loan.

On August 23, 2020, when questioned by a reporter from Grupo Globo about the deposits made by Fabrício Queiroz in the total amount of R$89,000 in Michelle Bolsonaro's account, Bolsonaro threatened the reporter by replying: "I'd like to smash your face in". The episode had a negative repercussion, including internationally, generating criticism from various organizations such as the Brazilian Press Association (ABI), the Brazilian Association of Investigative Journalism (ABRAJI) and the Order of Attorneys of Brazil (OAB). Jair Bolsonaro and his son Carlos Bolsonaro posted a different version of the story on their social networks, with a caption distorting the situation, but they were quickly refuted by news-checking portals.

=== Saudi jewels case ===
On March 3, 2023, a report in the newspaper O Estado de São Paulo and confirmed by CNN Brazil revealed that in October 2021, during Jair Bolsonaro's presidency, members of his government's top and middle ranks allegedly tried to bring into Brazil, in violation of the law, a set of jewelry valued at R$16.5 million, consisting of a necklace, ring, watch and pair of diamond earrings, which were supposedly a gift from the Saudi Arabian monarchy to First Lady Michelle Bolsonaro. After the Federal Revenue Service seized the jewels because of their alleged illegality, customs officials allegedly faced pressure from members of the Bolsonaro government to release the items. There were at least four attempts to remove the items from customs, with the last allegedly taking place on December 29, 2022, two days before the end of the presidential term. The report said that the Federal Police opened a police inquiry on March 6, 2023, to investigate the fact reported and the alleged involvement of former President Jair Bolsonaro in the episode.

On March 9, 2023, Minister Augusto Nardes of the Federal Court of Accounts (TCU) ordered Bolsonaro to preserve intact and not wear the collection of men's jewelry he allegedly received from Saudi Arabia, as the first set of gifts had been detained by the Federal Revenue Service at Guarulhos airport in October 2021. On the same day, Senator Omar Aziz, chairman of the Federal Senate's Transparency and Oversight Committee, announced that he would investigate the existence of a relationship between the sale of the Landulpho Alves Refinery in Mataripe (located in Bahia and previously owned until 2021 by Petrobras) and the jewels received as a gift from Saudi Arabia by the Bolsonaro government. Bolsonaro reportedly rejected these accusations through his social networks. On March 15, 2023, the TCU ordered Bolsonaro to return the case of men's jewelry received from Saudi Arabia and weapons donated by the United Arab Emirates to the coffers of the Presidency of the Republic within five days.

On March 24, 2023, former President Bolsonaro's lawyers handed over the second set of jewels he received, estimated at R$400,000. After verifying that Bolsonaro still possessed jewels, the TCU ordered him to return the third box of jewelry with assets estimated at more than R$500,000. He handed over on April 4, 2023, the day before he gave evidence to the Federal Police.

== Human rights ==
=== Arms, physical violence, death penalty and torture ===
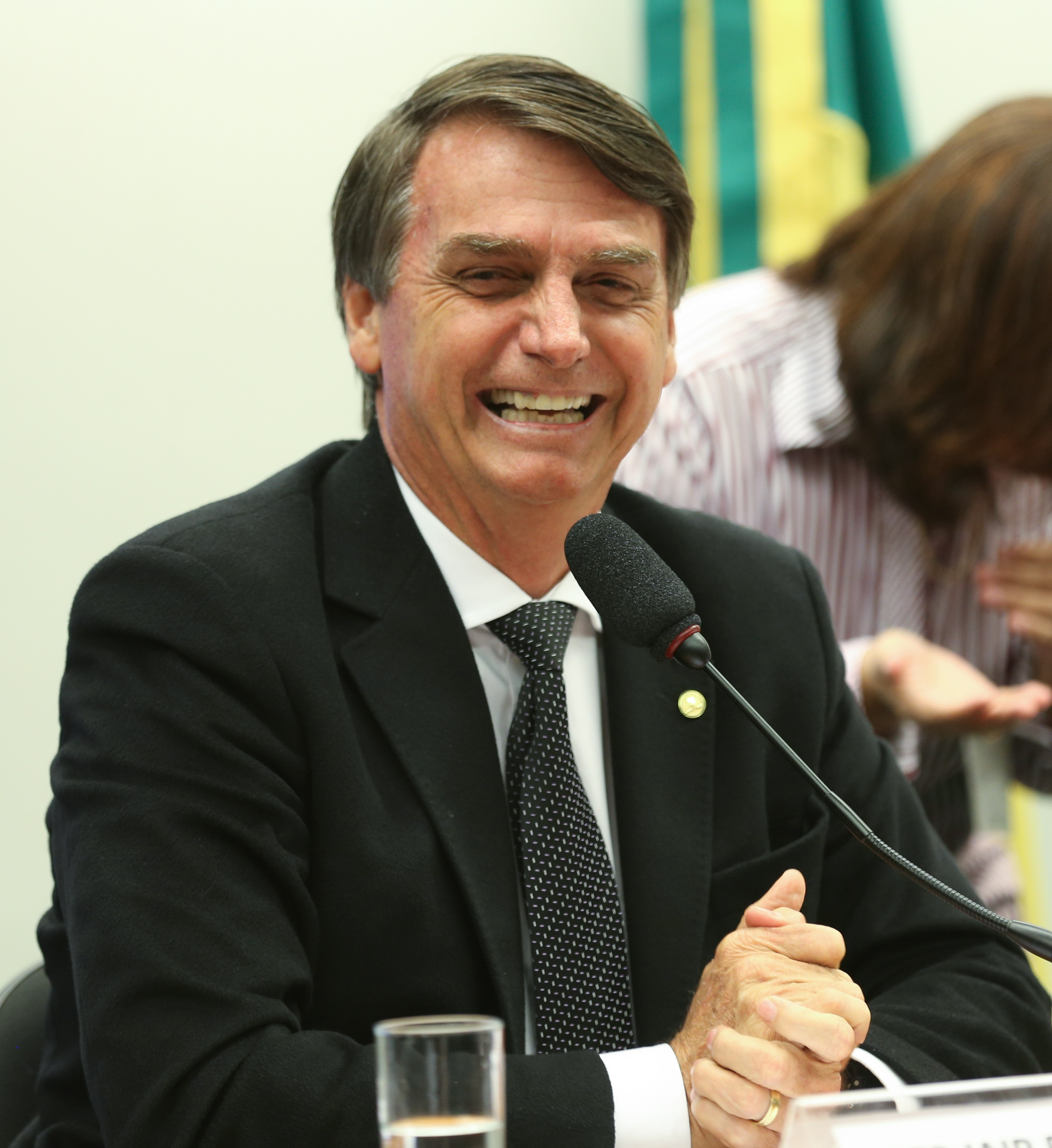
Bolsonaro at the House Ethics Committee in November 2016

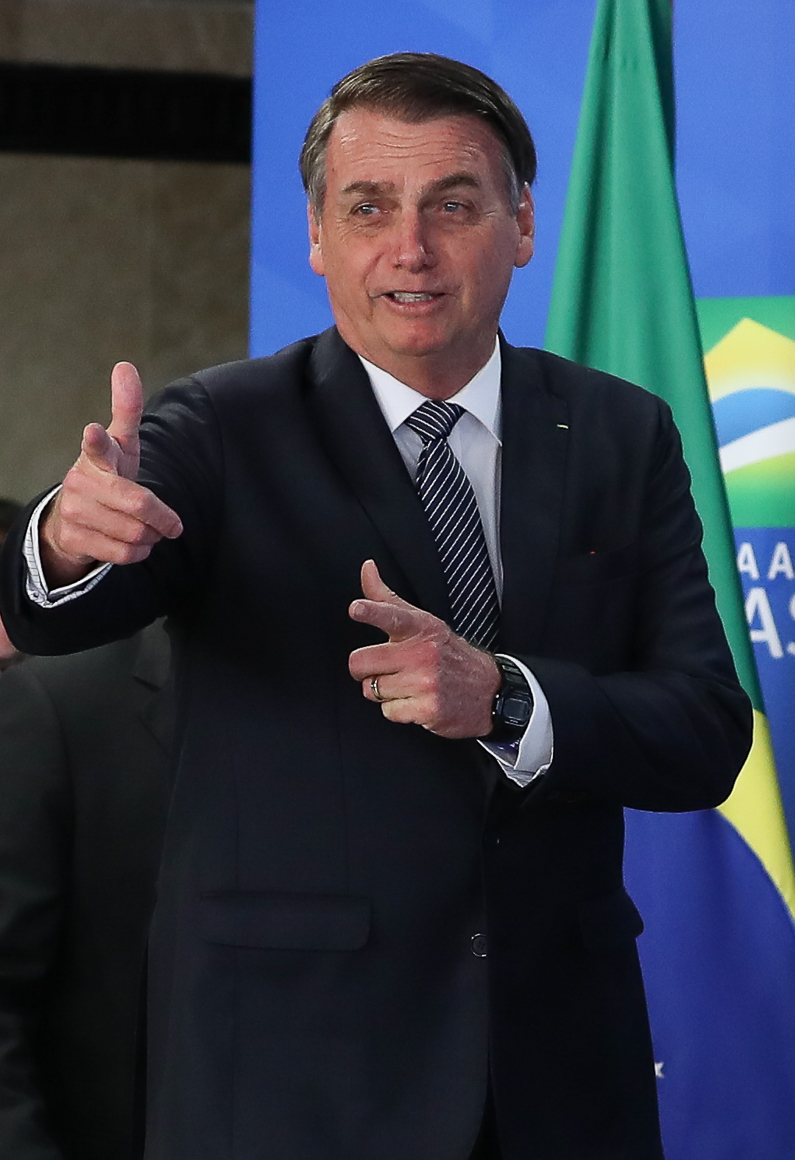
Bolsonaro is known for his finger gun gesture, which he used during his presidential campaign.

In 1999, Bolsonaro told the program Câmera Aberta that he was "favorable to torture" and called democracy "crap". In 2000, in an interview with IstoÉ magazine, he defended the use of torture in cases of drug trafficking and kidnapping, as well as summary execution for cases of premeditated crime. He explained that "the aim is to get the guy to talk" and "get beaten up so he can talk". In the interview, he also advocates censorship, although he doesn't specify what kind. Despite these statements, he recently said that he would never have been in favor of torture.

On April 17, 2016, during Dilma Rousseff's impeachment process, Jair Bolsonaro congratulated Federal Deputy Eduardo Cunha on his handling of the impeachment trial and paid homage to Carlos Alberto Brilhante Ustra, the first military officer to be recognized by the courts as one of the torturers of the military dictatorship. In his defense, Bolsonaro claimed that his statements during the impeachment vote were protected by parliamentary immunity. In a 2018 interview, he defended Ustra again and called him a "national hero".

In 1999, while explaining to presenter Jô Soares why he defended the firing squad of former president Fernando Henrique Cardoso (PSDB), he said that "barbarity is privatizing Vale and telecommunications, handing over our oil reserves to foreign capital". In several interviews, he favored the death penalty in Brazil for premeditated crimes. He also supports reducing the age of criminal responsibility to 16.

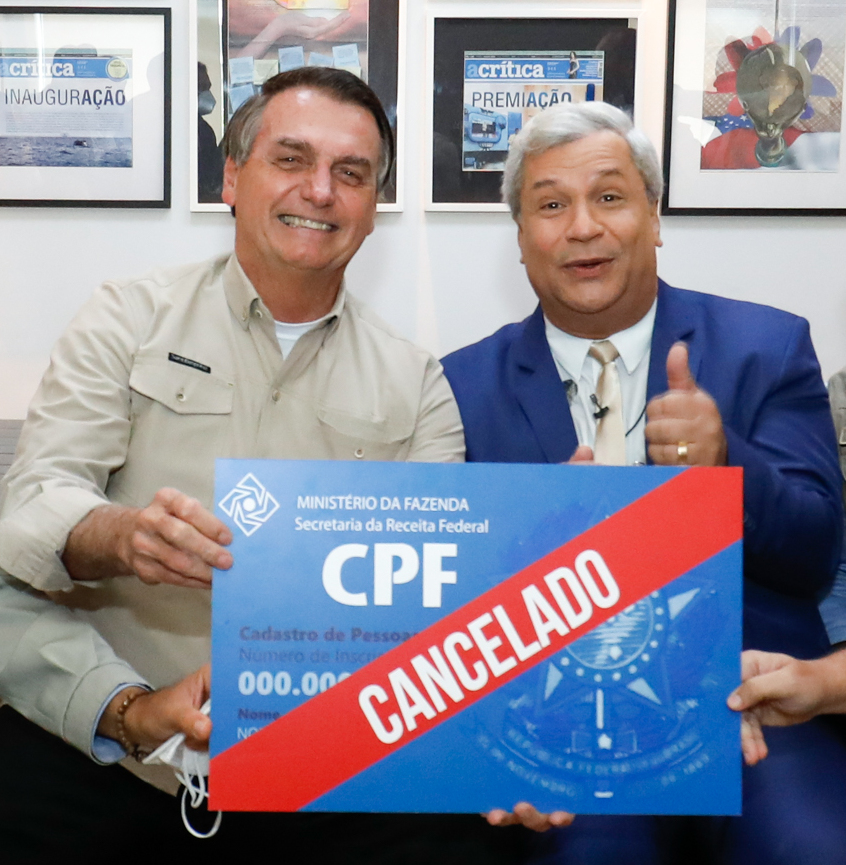
Bolsonaro next to Sikêra Júnior posing for a photo displaying a "CPF canceled" sign, an expression used to refer to those killed in confrontations with police in Brazil.

In 2015, in a video posted by Eduardo Bolsonaro (PSC-SP), Jair Bolsonaro said that "violence is fought with violence and not with human rights banners", such as those defended by Amnesty International, which he claimed was formed by "scoundrels" and "idiots". When asked about a survey by the organization that showed that the Brazilian police are the world's leading killers, Bolsonaro replied that he thought the "Military Police of Brazil should kill more." Data from the 9th edition of the Public Security Yearbook, published by the Folha de S. Paulo newspaper, shows that an average of eight people are killed every day by Brazilian police officers.

When asked during his presidential campaign in 2018 whether combating prejudice could be a government policy, Bolsonaro declared that he would put an end to what he called "coitadismo" ("underdog syndrome") in Brazil. He advocates repealing the Disarmament Statute and giving rural landowners the right to buy rifles to prevent invasions by the Landless Workers' Movement (MST). He also presented a bill that establishes voluntary chemical castration as a condition for a person convicted of rape to be able to advance their sentence. He is against the legalization of drugs. In the book A República das Milícias: Dos Esquadrões da Morte à Era Bolsonaro, Bruno Paes Manso argued for the existence of a "Militia Republic" in Brazil and classified Jair Bolsonaro as its captain.

=== Brazilian military dictatorship ===
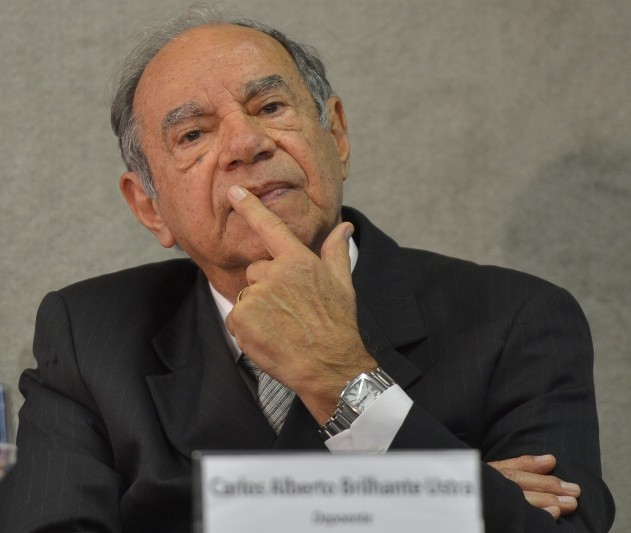
Carlos Brilhante Ustra, the first military man to be convicted of torture during the dictatorship.

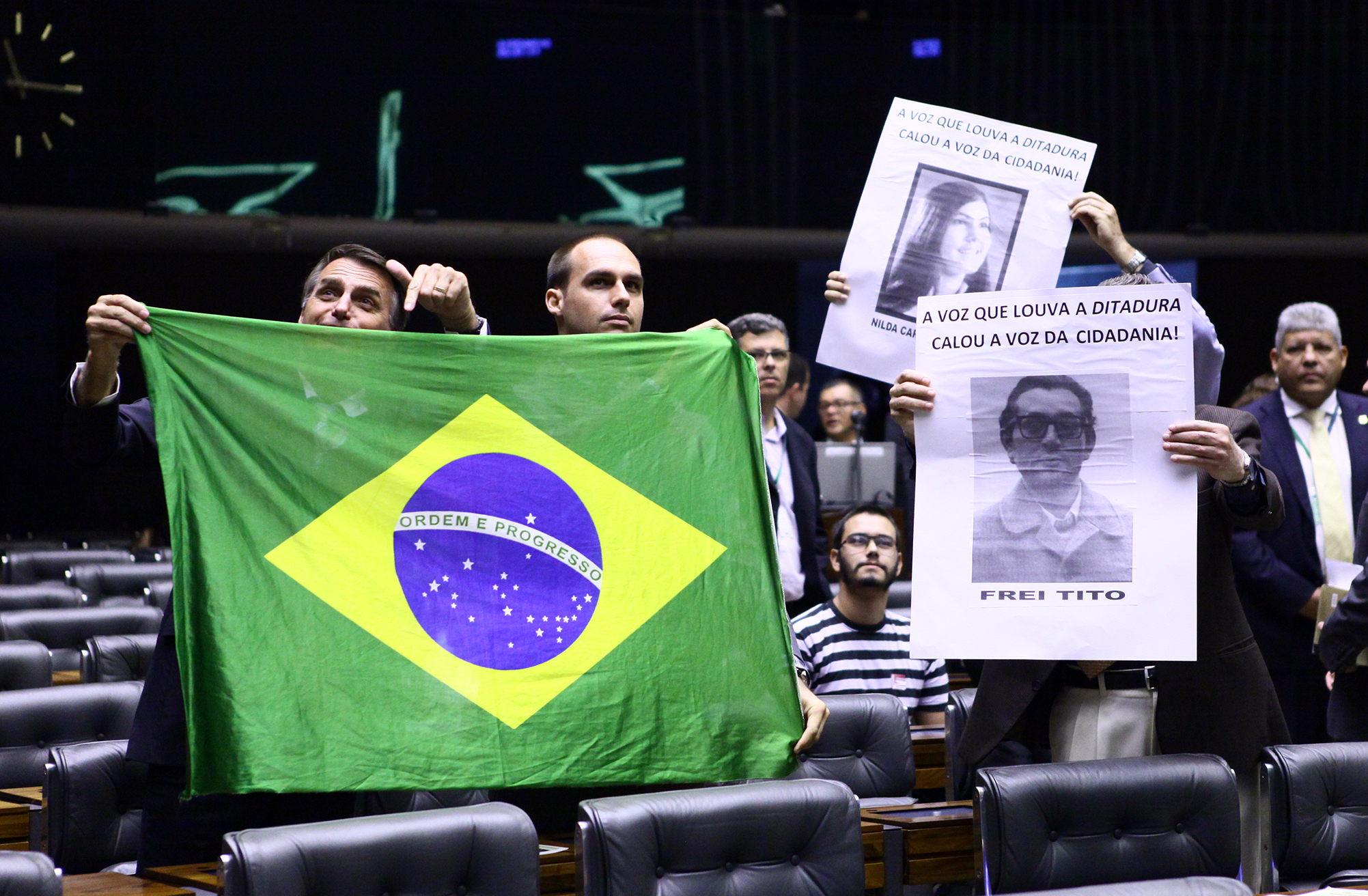
Bolsonaro, together with his son Eduardo, holding a Brazilian flag showing his support for the military dictatorship alongside opponents on April 1, 2014.

Bolsonaro is known for claiming that the Brazilian military dictatorship was a glorious period in Brazilian history. According to a letter published in the Folha de S. Paulo newspaper, it was "20 years of order and progress". In an interview with Época magazine in July 2011, he said that the military regime was not a dictatorship. Bolsonaro has been criticized by the media, politicians and the Torture Never Again group. In 1993, eight years after the return of democracy in Brazil, he said that only a military regime would lead to a more "prosperous and sustainable country". In an interview he gave to the TV show CQC ("Custe o Que Custar") on March 28, 2011, he said that he was inspired by the military dictatorship and that he missed the government of presidents Médici, Geisel and Figueiredo. He also expressed his support for the possible development of an atomic bomb in Brazil.

During the National Truth Commission's visit on September 21, 2013, to the 1st Army Police Battalion in Rio de Janeiro, where the DOI-CODI operated during the dictatorship, Bolsonaro pushed Senator Randolfe Rodrigues, who was trying to prevent him from entering the barracks. Rodrigues claimed that Bolsonaro punched him in the stomach, which he denied. At the scene, representatives of social movements such as Torture Never Again demanded that Bolsonaro leave, but he managed to enter the building. The delegation refused to conduct the visit in Bolsonaro's presence. In addition to Randolfe Rodrigues, Senator João Capiberibe (PSB-AP), who was tortured in the battalion during the dictatorship, and federal deputies Jandira Feghali (PCdoB-RJ) and Luiza Erundina (PSB-SP) were also present. Jair Bolsonaro supported the call for demonstrations on March 15, 2020, to close the National Congress and the Supreme Court. Several politicians and a Supreme Court justice claim that he has committed a crime of responsibility and misconduct.

==== Miriam Leitão ====
On July 19, 2019, Bolsonaro claimed that journalist and writer Miriam Leitão "was arrested when she was going to the Araguaia Guerrilla War to try to impose a dictatorship in Brazil" and stated twice that Miriam "lied about having been tortured" and abused in military facilities during the military dictatorship. In a statement read out loud on Jornal Nacional, Rede Globo repudiated Bolsonaro's claims about her.

==== Fernando Santa Cruz ====
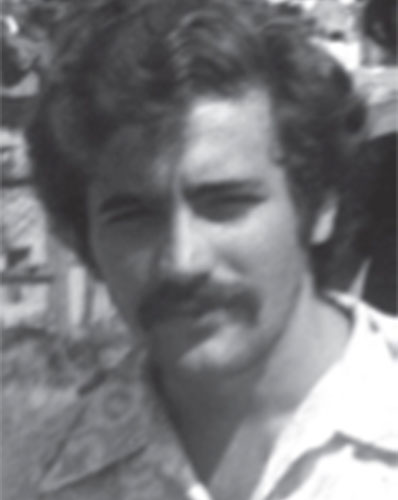
Fernando Santa Cruz, an opponent of the military regime murdered during the dictatorship and father of Felipe Santa Cruz, the former president of the OAB.

During a statement made a few days after his comment about Miriam Leitão, in which he criticized the role of the Order of Attorneys of Brazil (OAB) in the investigation into the knife attack he suffered during the 2018 election campaign, Bolsonaro announced that he would tell Felipe Santa Cruz, former president of the OAB, how his father Fernando Santa Cruz, rebel against the military regime, had died. The statement caused a lot of negative repercussions. Bolsonaro said that Fernando was killed by a left-wing group during the military dictatorship, which is contested by official documents that point out that he was a victim of the Brazilian state. On August 1, STF Minister Luís Roberto Barroso gave Bolsonaro 15 days to clarify the statement if he wanted to.

==== Dilma Rousseff ====
On August 5, 2019, Justice Rosa Weber also gave Bolsonaro a 15-day deadline to clarify a statement in which he suggested that former president Dilma Rousseff had participated in armed actions during the military dictatorship that resulted in the death of US Army Captain Charles Chandler. On receiving the "Personality of the Year" award from the Brazil-United States Chamber of Commerce in Texas, Bolsonaro said that "those who until recently occupied the government had their hands stained with blood in the armed struggle, even killing a captain, as I am a captain, in those sad years we had in the past". American Captain Chandler was killed on October 12, 1968, in the Sumaré neighborhood, on the west side of the city of São Paulo, in an attack carried out by three militants from the Popular Revolutionary Vanguard (VPR) and the National Liberation Action (ALN). Dilma never belonged to any of these groups.

=== Chilean dictatorship ===
In an interview with Veja magazine on December 2, 1998, Bolsonaro declared that the Chilean dictatorship of Augusto Pinochet, which killed more than 3,000 people and exiled another 200,000, "should have killed more people". He also praised Peruvian President Alberto Fujimori as a "model" for his use of military intervention against the judiciary and the legislature.

=== Religion ===
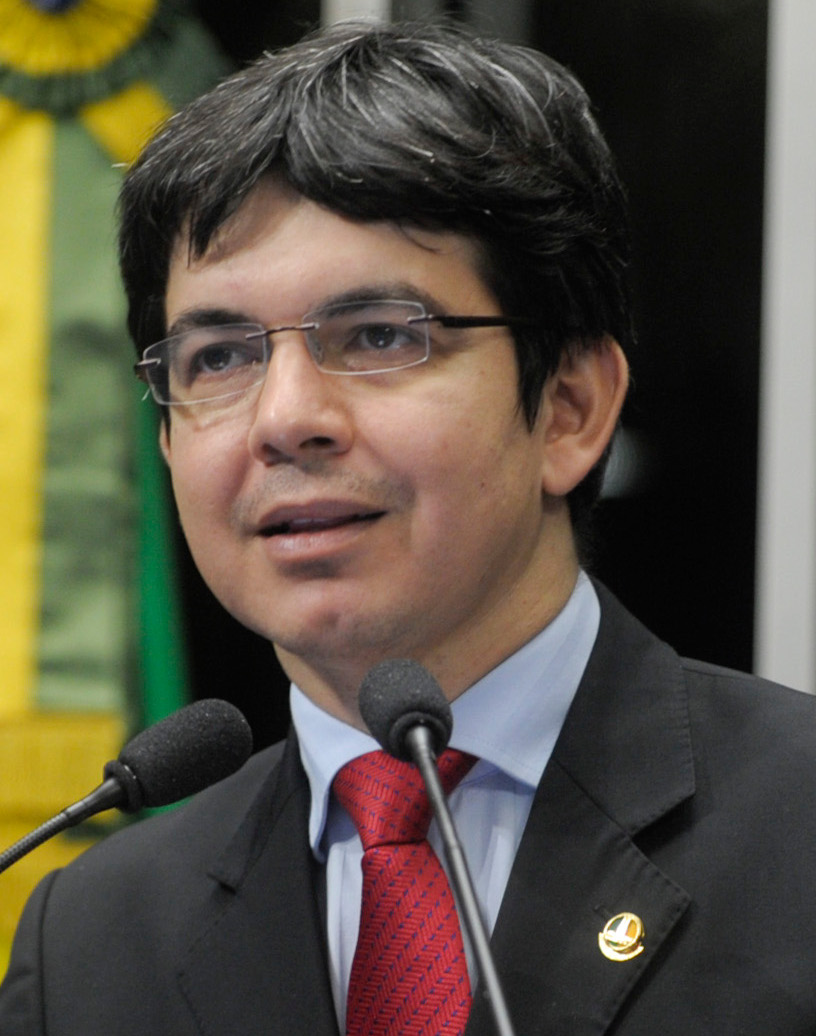
Senator Randolfe Rodrigues (PSOL-AP) accused Bolsonaro of punching him during a visit to the DOI-CODI in Rio de Janeiro in 2013.

In a speech in Campina Grande in February 2017, Bolsonaro criticized the secular state. In October 2018, he eased the statement by saying: "We're going to run a government for everyone, regardless of religion. Even those who are atheists. We have almost 5% of atheists in Brazil, and you have the same needs as the rest of us".

=== Women, gender equality and abortion ===
During an interview with IstoÉ magazine, Bolsonaro claimed to control the woman's topless habits. Regarding his first marriage, Bolsonaro said that his ex-wife was forced to "follow his ideas" in politics. In an interview with the newspaper Zero Hora in February 2015, he declared that it was unfair for women and men to receive the same salary because women get pregnant. In April 2017, in a speech at the Hebraica Club in Rio de Janeiro, Bolsonaro mentioned his 6-year-old daughter Laura, saying: "I have five children. There were four men, then on the fifth I weakened and a woman came."

On March 8, 2018, on International Women's Day, when questioned about whether he would increase female participation in a possible government, Bolsonaro replied: "I respect women, but does anyone here want Dilma (Rousseff) back by any chance? […] It's not a question of gender. You have to put in people who can do the job. If I appoint women, how many people of African descent will I have to appoint?"

In an interview for Época magazine in 2000, he said that he considered aborting his son Jair Renan and passed the decision on to his second wife at the time, Ana Cristina Valle. According to Gilson Cardoso, national coordinator of the National Human Rights Movement (MNDH), Bolsonaro opposes the Maria da Penha Law, which seeks to curb domestic violence against women.

==== Maria do Rosário ====
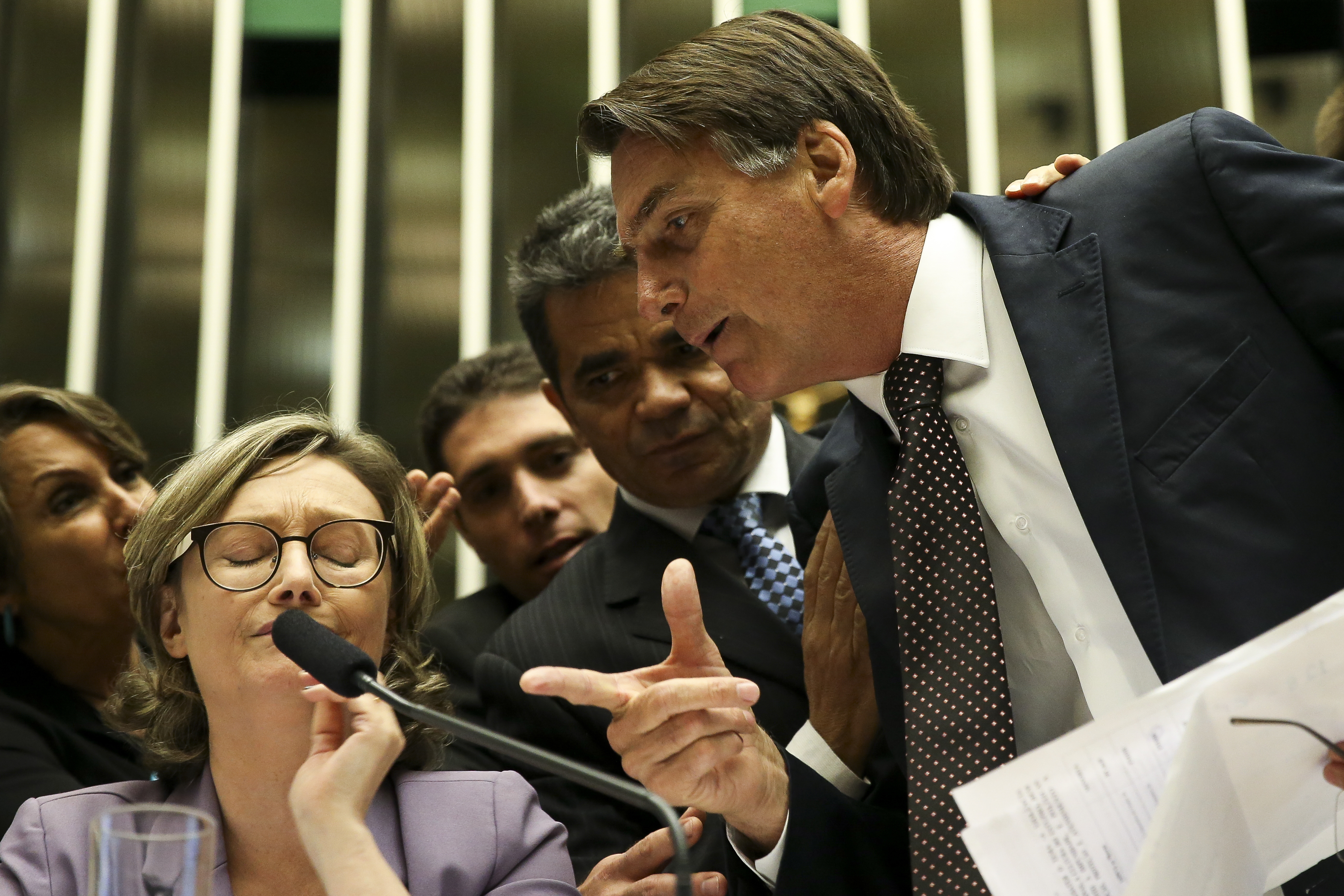
Bolsonaro argues with Maria do Rosário on the floor of the Chamber of Deputies during a discussion on violence against women.

Bolsonaro is perceived as sexist and misogynist by different sectors of society. On November 11, 2003, Bolsonaro and Federal Deputy Maria do Rosário were interviewed in the Green Room of Congress about the murders of Liana Friedenbach and Felipe Caffé. While Bolsonaro criticized the law on the age of criminal responsibility in Brazil, Rosário declared her position on the case according to the legislation. At one point, they got into an argument and Bolsonaro told Maria do Rosário: "I would never rape you because you don't deserve it".

On December 9, 2014, during a speech by Maria do Rosário in the Chamber of Deputies in which she defended the members of the Truth Commission, Bolsonaro verbally attacked her again. The fight occurred after she said that the military dictatorship was "an absolute disgrace" for Brazil. When questioned about his statements in a February 2015 interview, Bolsonaro told the newspaper Zero Hora: "She doesn't deserve [to be raped] because she's very bad, because she's very ugly. She's not my type. I would never rape her."

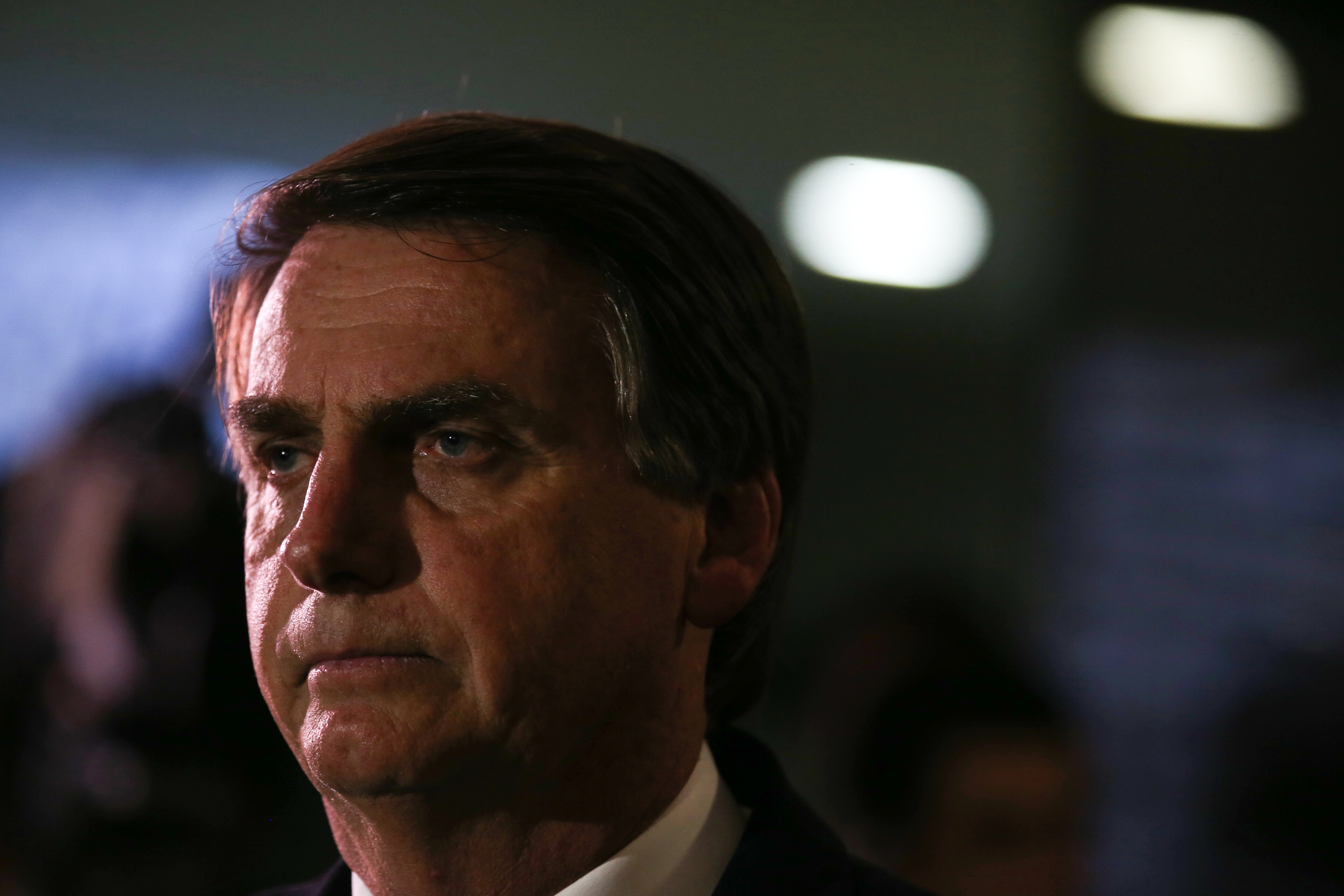
Bolsonaro talks to the press about becoming a defendant in the Supreme Court for saying that Maria do Rosário "doesn't deserve to be raped".

As a result of statements made during discussions with Maria do Rosário, Bolsonaro was convicted in the first instance of moral damages in September 2015. In June 2016, the Supreme Federal Court (STF), examining a complaint from the Public Prosecutor's Office and Maria do Rosário, decided to open two criminal proceedings against him. In a decision of four votes to one, the Second Chamber of the Supreme Court ruled that, besides inciting rape, Bolsonaro had offended her reputation. He became a defendant for allegedly condoning crime and for libel. The complaint against Bolsonaro for condoning crime was filed in December 2014 by Ela Wiecko. On August 15, 2017, the Superior Court of Justice (STJ) maintained the decision and ordered the payment of compensation of R$10,000 to Maria do Rosário. On February 19, 2019, the STF denied an appeal by Bolsonaro's defense and upheld the decision. In May, the Court ordered that the amount be paid within 15 working days and that Bolsonaro publish a retraction note.

On June 13, 2019, Bolsonaro apologized to Maria do Rosário in a message published on social media. In apologizing for his statements, Bolsonaro said he wanted to take advantage of the case to express his "full and unrestricted respect for women" and stressed that he had defended harsher sentences for those convicted of rape, such as chemical castration, and classifying crimes of passion as heinous.

==== Brigitte Macron ====
At the end of August 2019, a follower of Bolsonaro's Facebook page posted a montage of two photos, one of Emmanuel Macron and his wife, Brigitte, and the other of Bolsonaro and Michelle, to mock Brigitte's appearance. Bolsonaro's official page replied by laughing at the post. Members of the Bolsonaro government, such as Renzo Gracie and Paulo Guedes, also criticized Brigitte's appearance. The statements caused negative repercussions and spurred the #DesculpaBrigitte (#SorryBrigitte) online campaign, for which she publicly paid gratitude. The incident was the biggest diplomatic crisis between the two countries since the Lobster War in the 1960s. In an interview during the G7 meeting, Macron said that Bolsonaro's comment about his wife was "extremely disrespectful", as well as "sad" and a "shame" for Brazilian women. He said that he "respects" Brazilians, but that he hopes that "they will very quickly have a president who behaves up to the job".

==== Patrícia Campos Mello ====
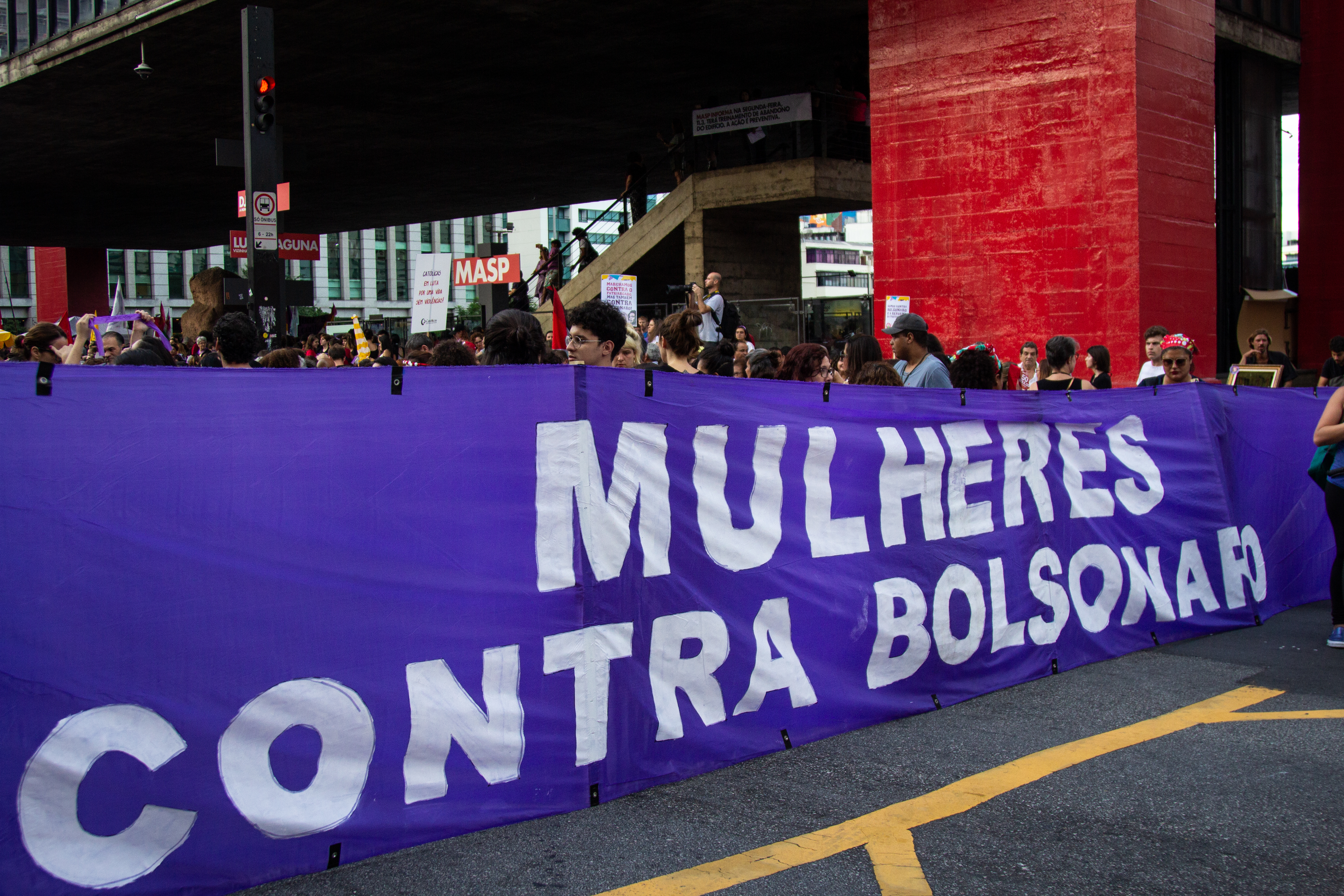
Women's protest on Paulista Avenue in March 2019.

On February 18, 2020, during an interview with a group of supporters in front of the Alvorada Palace, Bolsonaro insulted journalist Patrícia Campos Mello with a sexual slur. Several parties, politicians, celebrities and journalistic organizations considered the speech an attack on democracy and repudiated his attitude. For the National Association of Newspapers (ANJ), the Brazilian Association of Investigative Journalism (Abraji) and the Observatory of Press Freedom of the Order of Attorneys of Brazil (OAB), Bolsonaro's speech disrespects the press and its essential work in democracy. The Brazilian Press Association (ABI) called the aggression "cowardly" and asked the Public Prosecutor's Office to denounce Bolsonaro's violation of conduct. The Union of Professional Journalists of São Paulo says that his speech can be classified as insulting and is subject to criminal liability. The National Federation of Journalists (Fenaj), in a note signed by the National Women's Commission, says that the episode involved sexism and misogyny. In a statement, Folha de S. Paulo said: "Bolsonaro has assaulted reporter Patrícia Campos Mello and all professional journalism with his attitude. He also violates the dignity, honor and decorum that the law demands of the exercise of the Presidency."

=== Homophobia ===
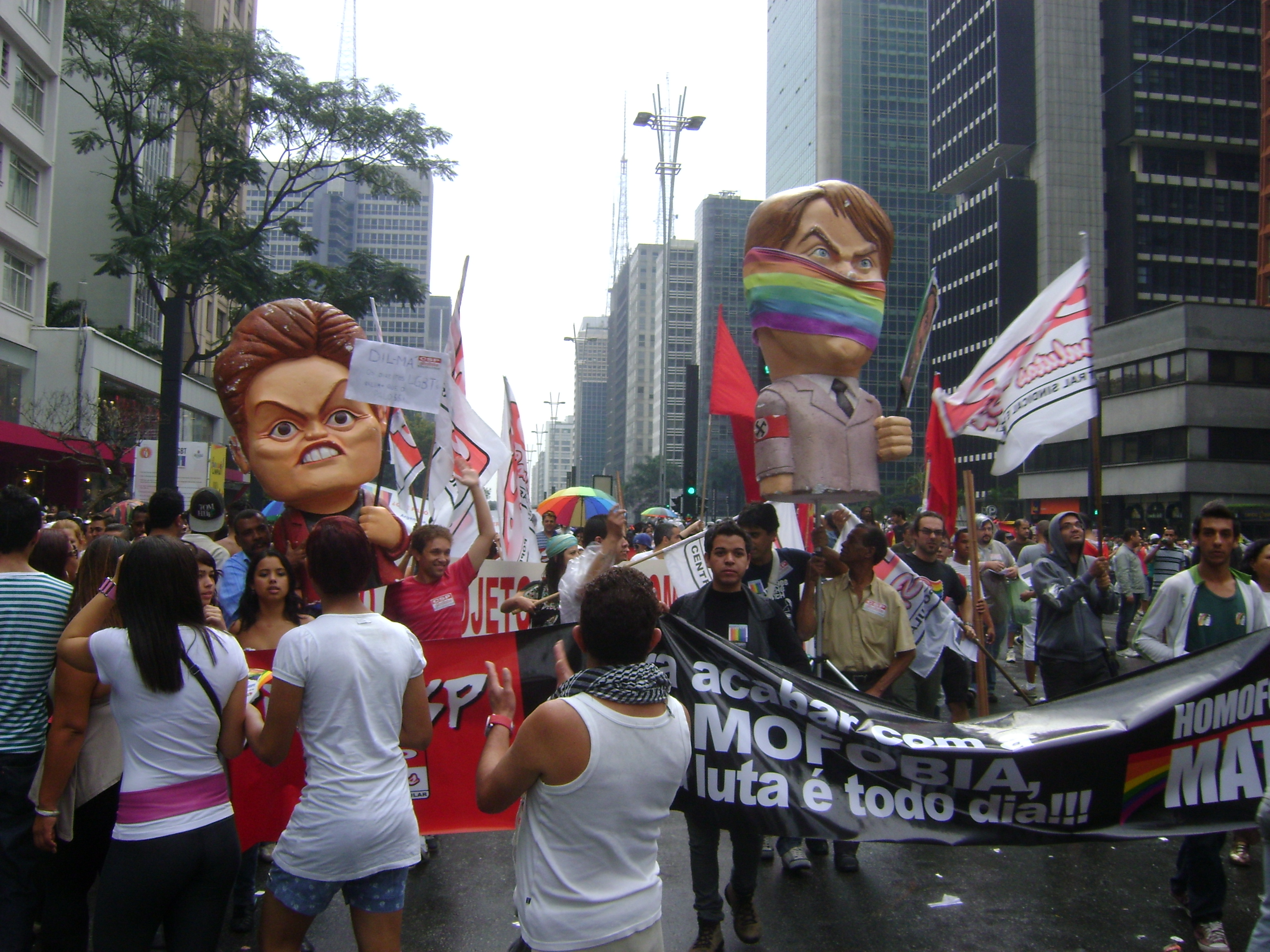
Protest against Bolsonaro during São Paulo's LGBT Pride Parade in 2011.

Bolsonaro has publicly condemned homosexuality and opposed the implementation of laws that guarantee LGBT rights, such as same-sex marriage, the adoption of children by homosexual couples and changes to civil registration for transsexuals. He said in an interview with Jornal de Notícias that "many of the children who will be adopted by gay couples will be abused by these homosexual couples." In May 2002, he said to Folha de S. Paulo that he could beat up homosexuals: "I'm not going to fight or discriminate, but if I see two men kissing in the street, I'm going to hit them."

In 2002, a human rights bill was sent to Congress that sought to amend the Military Penal Code to abolish the differentiation in punishment between homosexual and heterosexual libidinous practices. Bolsonaro opposed it, claiming that it would reduce the security of the military and force them to become homosexuals. In 2010, he threatened to be expelled from the Human Rights Commission of the Chamber of Deputies for defending, first in a debate on TV Câmara and later on other programs, that beating a child is the best way to prevent them from becoming gay. According to Federal Deputy Iriny Lopes, president of the commission, measures would be implemented before the end of the legislative year, since Bolsonaro's remarks were a direct attack on human rights. Pedro Wilson, a member of the commission, supported Lopes' decision and added that it was not the first time he had acted in such a way. In response to the decision, Bolsonaro said he didn't care about them and asked for respect for the, according to him, heterosexual minority that he represents on the commission.

A petition proposing to punish Bolsonaro and signed by Pedro Wilson, Iriny Lopes and Chico Alencar was approved on December 1, 2010. He was defended by Federal Deputy Fernando Chiarelli, who also criticized the booklet drawn up by the Ministry of Education to teach children to socialize with homosexual classmates. Although Bolsonaro's stance was disapproved of by the majority of the commission's members, the parliamentarians opposed the application of punishment.

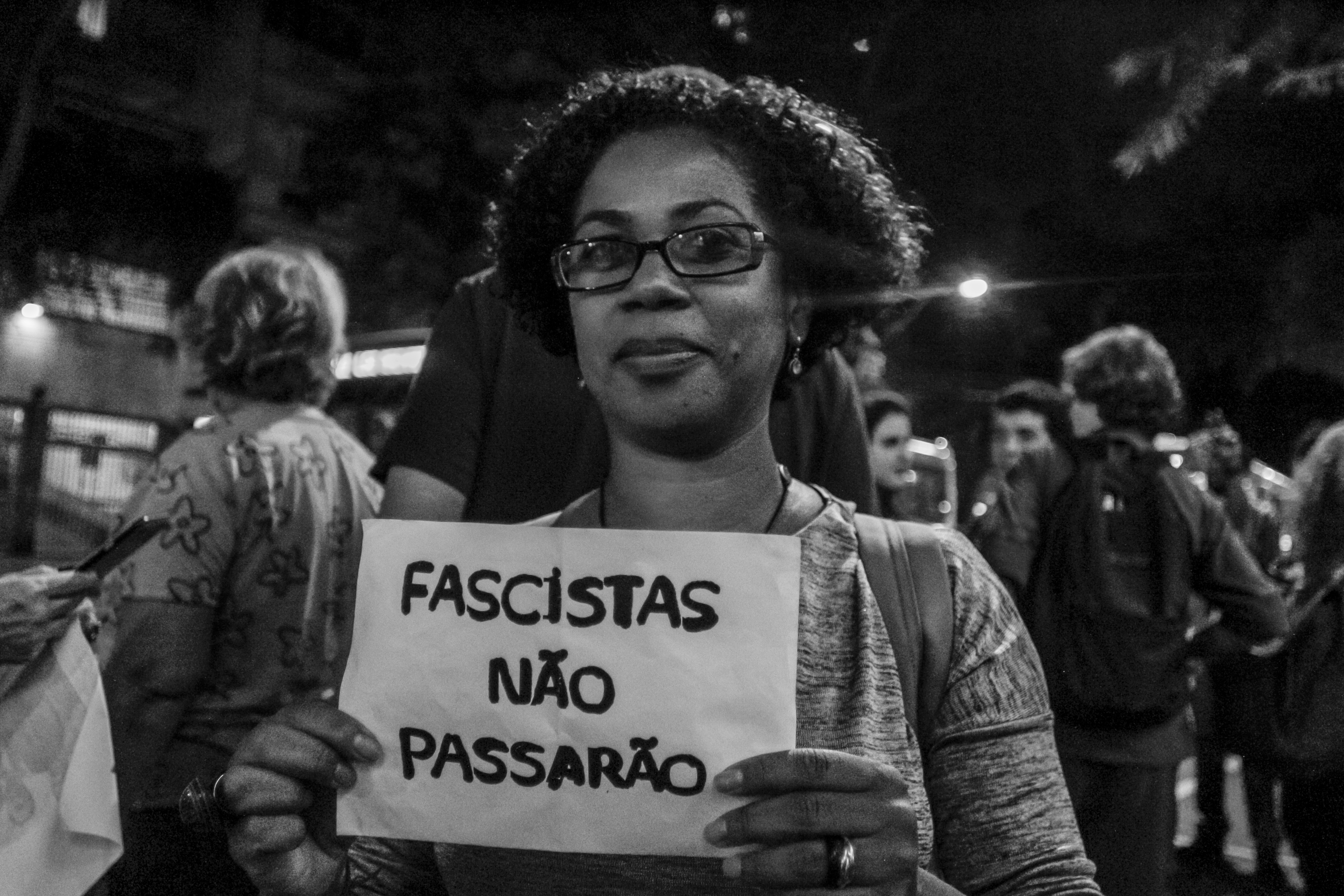
A demonstrator protesting against Bolsonaro during his lecture at the Hebraica in Rio de Janeiro on April 3, 2017.

In March 2011, in an interview he gave to Rede Bandeirantes' CQC program, Bolsonaro took a stand against movements that "advocate" homosexuality and bisexuality. He said that his son, with a "good education and a present father", "doesn't run the risk" of becoming homosexual, and that gay parades are "promoting bad habits". On April 3, a demonstration was held against his statements. On November 9, 2017, the Rio de Janeiro State Court of Justice ordered Bolsonaro to pay a fine of R$150,000 for collective moral damage due to statements given on the show. Judge Luciana Teixeira said that he had abused his right to free expression to commit an illegal act.

In May 2011, after the Supreme Court recognized the stable union of homosexual couples, Jair Bolsonaro said that the "next step will be the adoption of children [by homosexual couples] and the legalization of pedophilia", forcing an association between pedophilia and homosexuality. His remarks were mocked on social media after the Supreme Court's decision. Pamphlets attacking homosexual advocates were also scattered around the city of Resende, in Rio de Janeiro, signed by him; the material was available on his website. In October 2011, a lawsuit against Bolsonaro was filed with the Council of Ethics and Parliamentary Decorum by Socialism and Liberty Party (PSOL), which accused him of spreading prejudice and encouraging violence and quoted a discussion he had with a female senator about the bill criminalizing homophobia on May 12 in the Senate. It also cites Bolsonaro's participation in the CQC program.

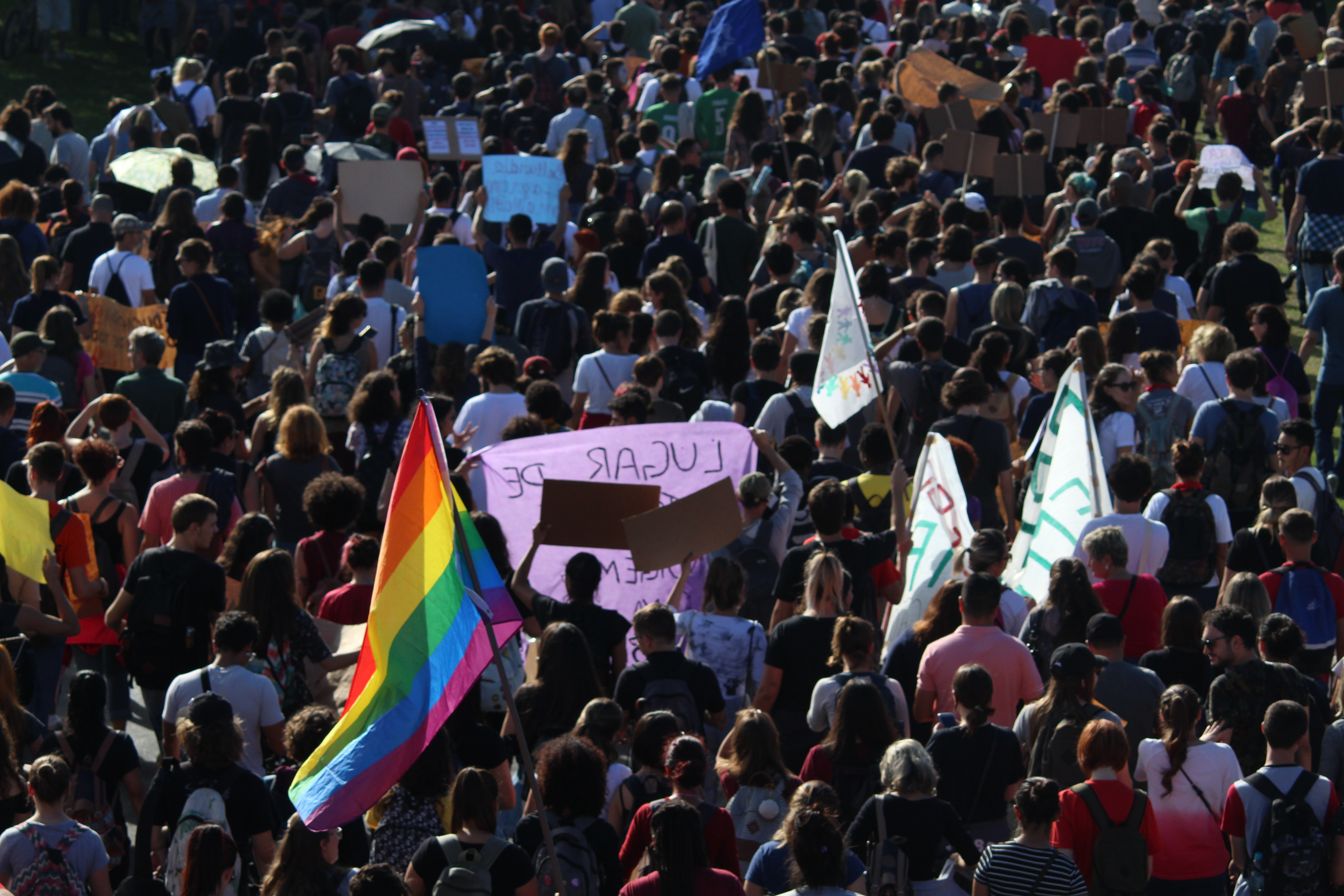
LGBT flag at a protest against Bolsonaro in May 2019.

In an interview for the documentary Out There, made by British actor and comedian Stephen Fry and shown on the BBC in 2013, Bolsonaro said: "No father is proud to have a gay son … We Brazilians don't like homosexuals". In another interview with El País in February 2014, Bolsonaro said that the "majority" of homosexuals are "the result of drug use". In March 2016, American actor Elliot Page published an interview given by Bolsonaro in 2015 for the documentary series Gaycation. In the article, Page, openly LGBT, claimed to have read an article in which he said that homosexual children should be beaten and asked if Bolsonaro thought he should have been beaten as a child. Bolsonaro replied by saying that the "growing" number of openly gay people is due to "liberalism, drugs and women also working".

On October 6, 2018, Bolsonaro said: "We're going to make a government for everyone. For gays, and there are even gays who are fathers, gays who are mothers. It's a project for all of you." When asked by William Bonner on Jornal Nacional what he would advise those who are prejudiced and aggressive against gays, Bolsonaro replied: "Aggression against a fellow human being has to be punished according to the law. If the reason is similar, the penalty must be aggravated." On August 10, 2019, during the March for Jesus in Brasilia, Bolsonaro classified what he considers "gender ideology" as "something from the devil" and explained that he would not welcome policies that change the "traditional family" without an amendment to the Brazilian constitution. He concluded by saying that, despite being approved, he maintained that the family is composed of a man and a woman, since "you can't amend the Bible"

==== Jean Wyllys ====
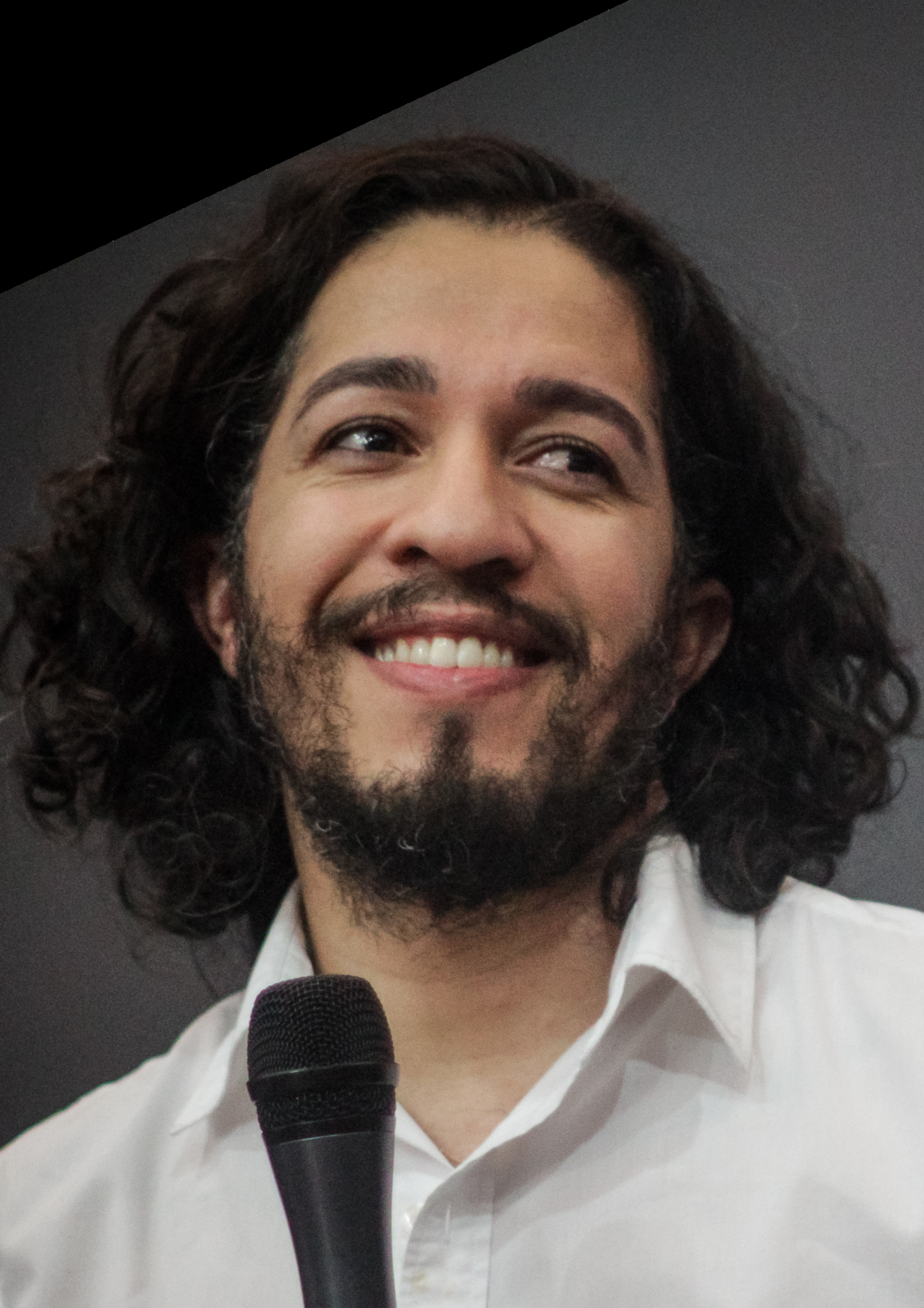
Former Deputy Jean Wyllys (PSOL).

On April 27, 2011, Bolsonaro became involved in a controversy with openly homosexual Federal Deputy Jean Wyllys (PSOL). At a hearing on public safety, Wyllys allegedly told Justice José Cardozo that "crime has many causes and one of the causes is hatred, the fruit of racism and prejudice. Stimulating hatred and murder is not freedom of expression". After criticizing the national human rights plan, Bolsonaro said that he knew parents who "are ashamed of their gay children". Interrupted by Manuela d'Ávila (PCdoB), president of the human rights commission, who found the remarks offensive, Bolsonaro denied having offended any parliamentarians. Wyllys admitted feeling offended by Bolsonaro's remarks, who attacked Wyllys by saying: "That's your problem. I wouldn't be proud to have a son like you". On leaving the hearing, Minister José Eduardo Cardozo said: "Human beings should be treated as human beings. People have the right to be whatever they want. We can even disagree, but we must not go around expressing hateful positions, deadly hatred."

==== School without Homophobia and sex education ====
On May 11, 2011, Bolsonaro distributed pamphlets in the Senate opposing the "gay kit" which, according to him, the Ministry of Education planned to distribute in schools against homophobia and he considered to be "promoting homosexuality". The leaflets against a plan to promote human and LGBT rights were strongly opposed by Senator Marinor Brito (PSOL). She, who defends the criminalization of homophobia and any statement against homosexual conduct, seeing Bolsonaro presenting leaflets to the media, reacted by slapping the papers and demanding to remove them; Bolsonaro reacted by calling her "heterophobic". Later, he said: "Since it's hard to find a male out there, I'm presenting myself as a male and she's all over it. She can't see a heterosexual in front of her. She jinxed me twice: once that I'm married and once that I'm not interested in her. It's very bad, I'm not interested." According to journalists, Brito and Bolsonaro almost physically assaulted each other. On the same day, Marinor Brito filed a lawsuit against him. Anthropologist Luis Mott said he would sue Bolsonaro because his pamphlets featured Mott's photo accompanied by phrases that, according to him, were not his own.

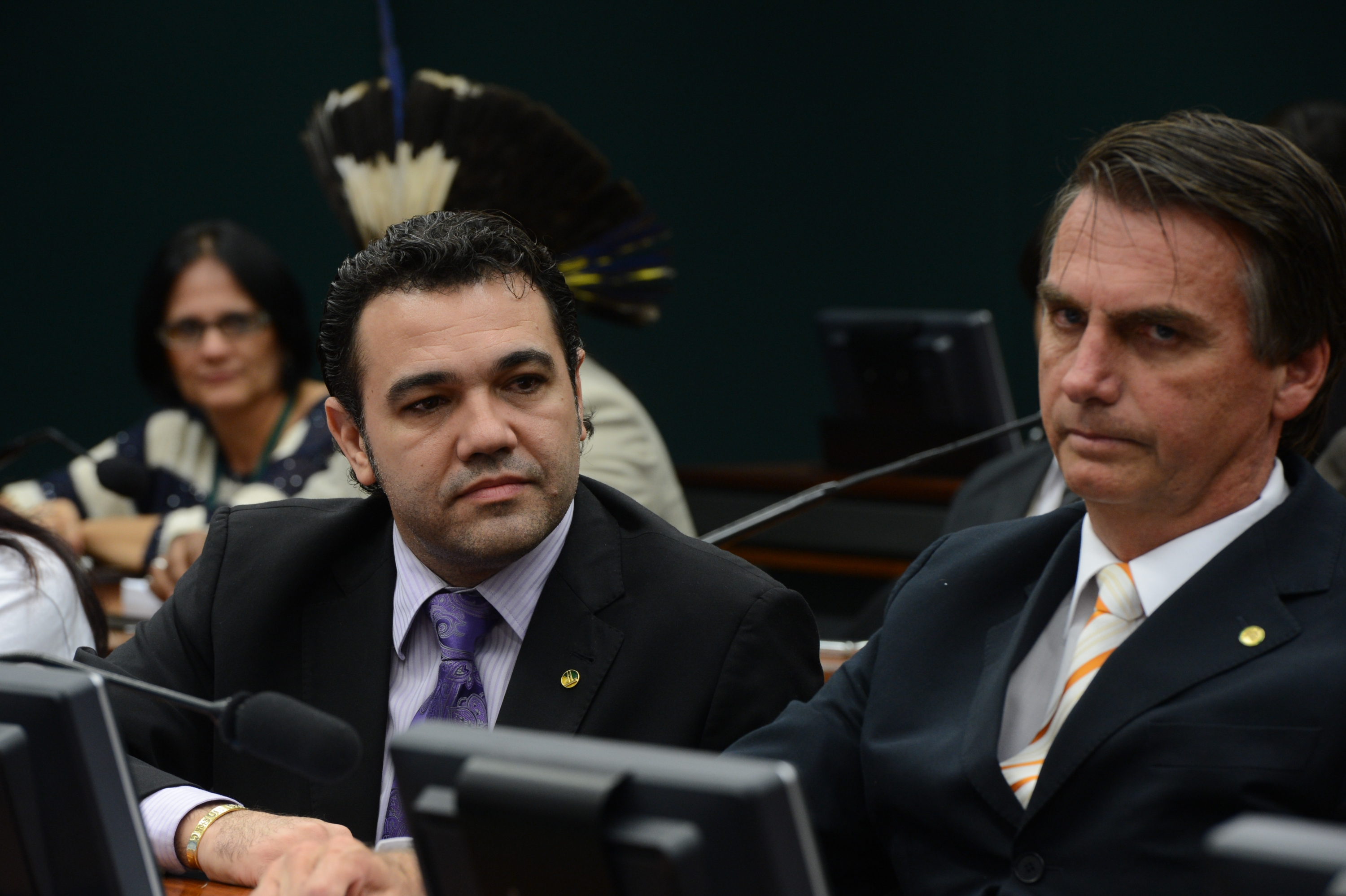
Brazilian federal deputies Marco Feliciano (left) and Jair Bolsonaro.

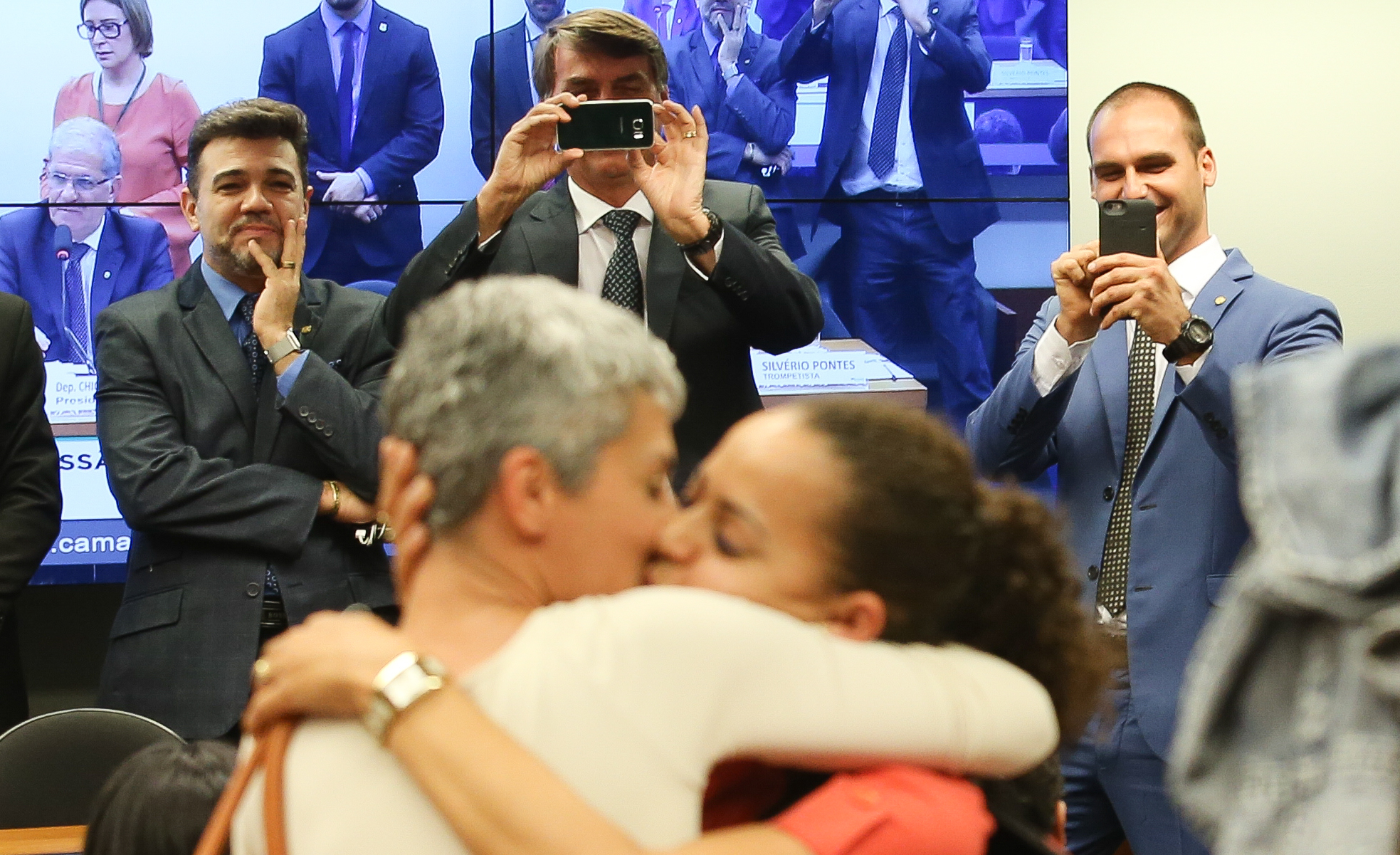
Beijaço against Bolsonaro and Marco Feliciano in the Chamber of Deputies in May 2016.

In an interview with Playboy magazine in June 2011, Bolsonaro said: "I would be incapable of loving a homosexual son. I'm not going to be a hypocrite: I'd rather have my son die in an accident than appear with a man. As far as I'm concerned, he'll have died anyway." He also said that if a homosexual couple moved in next door, it would devalue his house. In July of the same year, during an interview with readers of Época magazine, he stated that "if fighting to prevent the distribution of the 'gay kit' (Note: A set of guidelines supported by UNESCO and drawn up by the Ministry of Human Rights, in partnership with non-governmental organizations, aimed at promoting citizenship and human rights for the LGBT community.) in primary schools with the intention of encouraging homosexuality, in a real affront to the family, is being prejudiced, then I am prejudiced, with great pride".

When Bolsonaro began campaigning as a pre-candidate for the presidency of Brazil, he adopted a moderate stance towards LGBT people and claimed that he had nothing against homosexuals, but that he was only fighting what he called the "gay kit" in schools. On January 11, 2016, he published a video on his official channel that said: "I have nothing to do with anyone's behavior. If a man or woman later decides to move in with their partner, form a couple, move in with those of the same sex, then they can be happy. But we can't allow children to become homosexuals in the future, or to have this homosexual behavior in the future, due to the influence of the school. That's unacceptable." He has maintained his position stating that he has nothing against gays and that he is only fighting the "gay kit" in schools.

On January 10, 2016, Bolsonaro posted a video on his Facebook page in which he criticized the public school curriculum which, according to him, includes information on homosexuality and sex education. He was referring to the book Le Guide du zizi sexuel, which "encourages children to take an early interest in sex" and is being distributed to children as young as 6 years old. The Ministry of Education (MEC) said in a statement on January 15 that it had nothing to do with the book. The same rumor had already circulated in 2013, when it had to be explained that there was no recommendation from the ministry about the book, nor would it be included in the National Textbook Program and the National School Library Program.

In 2018, during the presidential election, the Superior Electoral Court (TSE) ordered the removal of videos claiming that the French book Le Guide du zizi sexuel (associated by Bolsonaro with the "gay kit") had been distributed by government programs while Fernando Haddad was Minister of Education. The representation targeted Jair Bolsonaro and his sons Carlos and Flávio Bolsonaro. According to Justice Carlos Horbach, the videos constitute "the dissemination of a fact that is known to be untrue, by the represented candidate and his supporters, in several posts made on social networks" which "generates misinformation in the electoral period, with damage to the political debate". He added that the book was not part of the School without Homophobia program, which was not even implemented by the MEC.

=== Racism and xenophobia ===
==== Black people ====
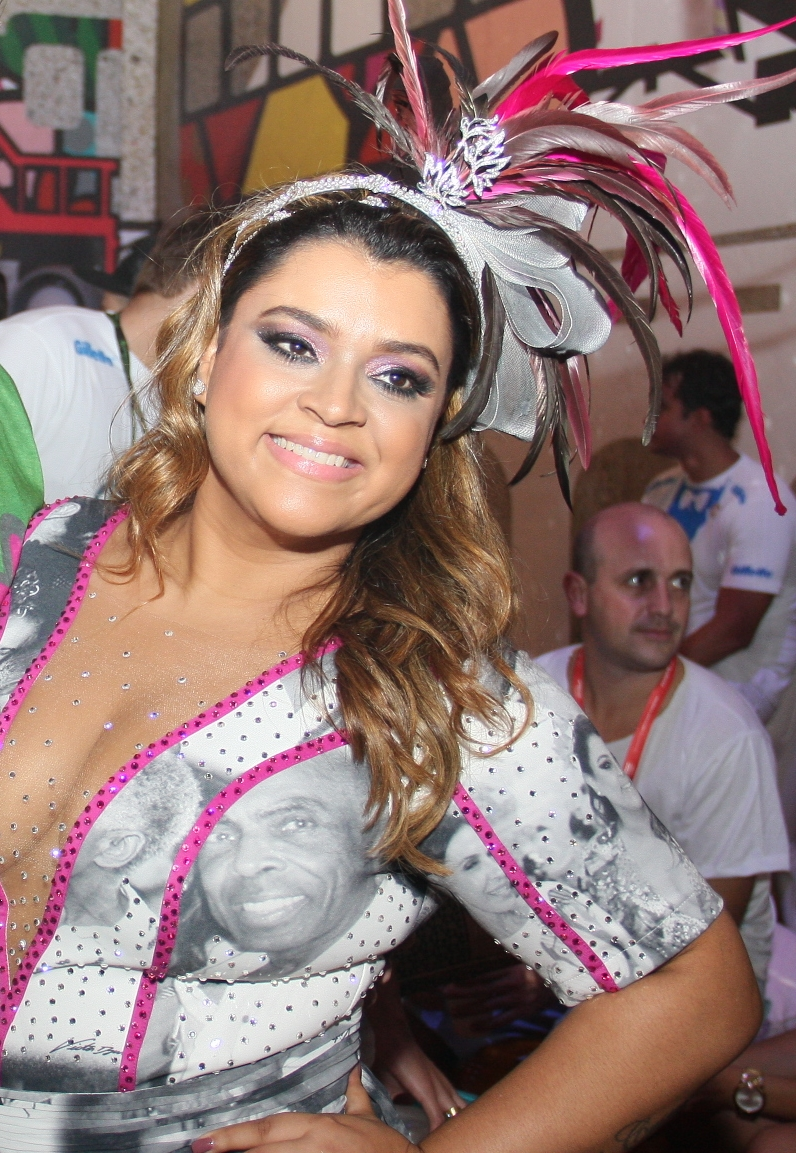
Preta Gil at the 2013 carnival.

Bolsonaro disapproves of the application of affirmative action, such as racial quotas for Afro-Brazilians. In 2006, as a protest against the formulation of quota policies in public universities, he presented a supplementary bill in the Chamber of Deputies proposing the establishment of quotas for black and brown deputies, admitting that if the bill came to a vote, it would be against him. In an interview given to the TV show CQC ("Custe o Que Custar") on March 28, 2011, the singer Preta Gil asked him what he would do if his son fell in love with a black girl. Bolsonaro stated that he "wouldn't discuss promiscuity" and that he "doesn't face this risk because his children were very well educated".

The following day, he claimed that his answer had been a "misunderstanding". Preta Gil said she would file a complaint with the Public Prosecutor's Office against Bolsonaro for homophobia and racial prejudice. In the same week, Bolsonaro declared that he "doesn't care about these people", referring to LGBT movements.

In response to the protests against Bolsonaro, his sons Carlos and Flávio Bolsonaro argued that the last statement he made in the interview, in which he classified interracial dating as "promiscuity", may have been misinterpreted due to an error in the program's editing. They also said, defending his statements against homosexuality in the family, that being homosexual is not "normal" and that the majority of Brazilians agree with Jair Bolsonaro, who defends the integrity of the family and security. Bolsonaro claimed that he assumed the question was about his son's relationship with a homosexual. His children treat all the people who accuse him of being homophobic and racist as "opportunists". He justified himself by saying that he was interviewed on a computer and that he didn't understand the last question of the interview.

Bolsonaro announced that he would return to the program to clarify his statements, especially about Preta Gil's question. His comments were considered an "explicit case of racism" by Luiza Bairros, chief minister of the Special Secretariat for Policies to Promote Racial Equality. She referred to Bolsonaro's statement on racial quotas and said that freedom of expression cannot be confused with a crime of racial prejudice. According to her, Bolsonaro committed a crime established in the Brazilian constitution. His statements also resonated on social media. A Facebook page with more than 20,000 members protesting against Bolsonaro's alleged statements of homophobia and racism was launched. On Twitter, the hashtag "#forabolsonaro" (#bolsonaroout) was among the most commented on of the week. Other websites counted more than twenty-five thousand signatures calling for Bolsonaro's mandate to be revoked.

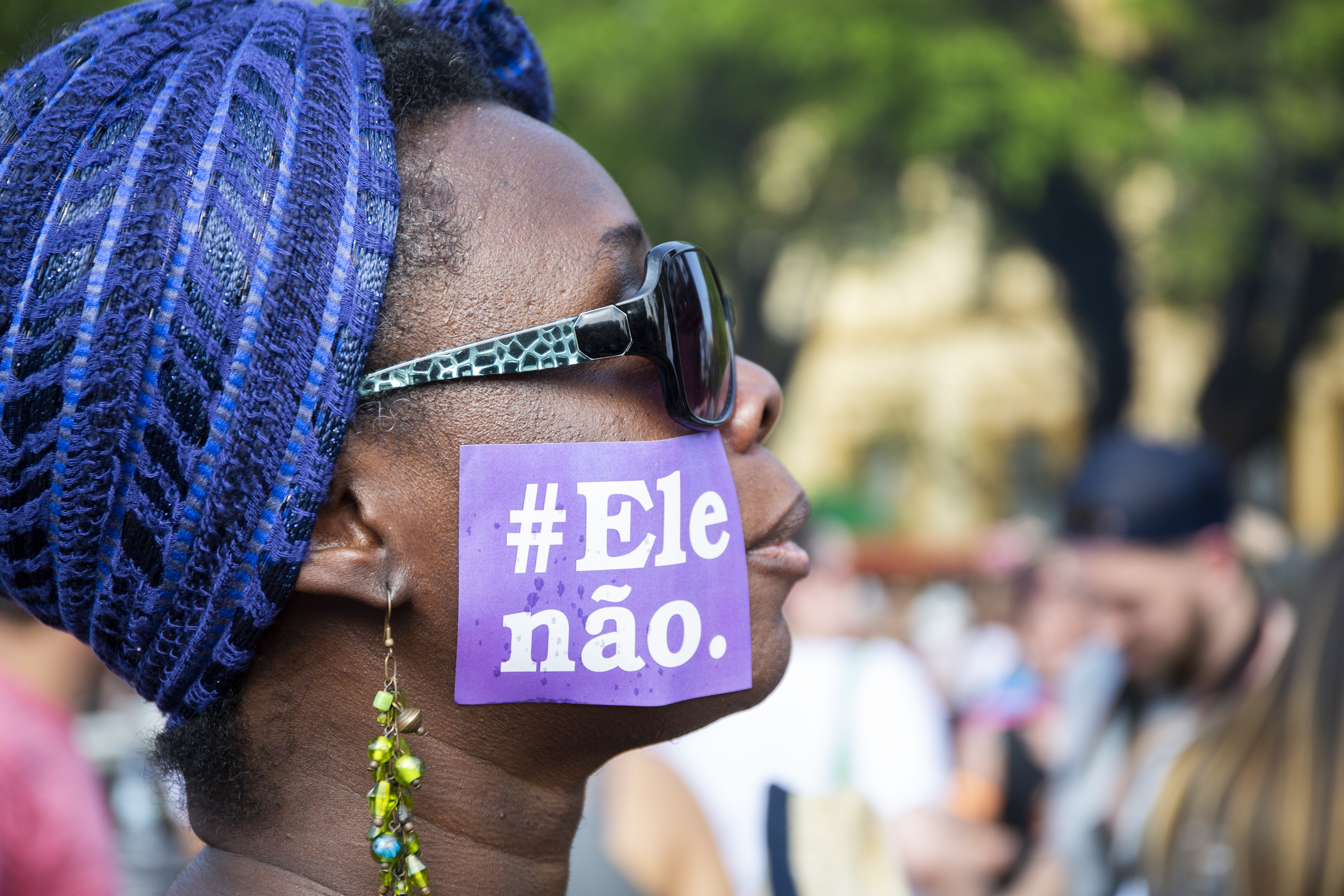
Demonstration against presidential candidate Jair Bolsonaro in Porto Alegre.

After the interview, originally aired on March 28, 2011, the CQC program replayed the controversial questions from the interview. Bolsonaro said he had understood that the relationship would be with a homosexual and replied that his children were "very well educated" and did not live in an environment like Preta Gil had "unfortunately" lived in. Rafinha Bastos, one of the show's hosts, assumed that Bolsonaro had based his answer on the lack of a law against homophobia to prevent it from being considered a crime, as it would have been if the answer had been racist. He promised to explain himself publicly.

Some groups in favor of Bolsonaro protested. A demonstration called on the internet took place on April 9 near São Paulo Museum of Art (MASP) in São Paulo. A group opposed to Bolsonaro, formed by around seventy people, displayed placards and war chants; the group in favor of Bolsonaro had around forty members. Despite the lack of physical aggression, eight members of the group supporting Bolsonaro and two of the group against him were arrested. The former were members of the Ultradefesa, União Nacionalista and Carecas groups, who were investigated for crimes of intolerance, and the latter were anarchist punks who did not carry any documents. A participant in the self-styled "nationalist" group had to be removed after arguing with a member of the gay movement. On social media, Bolsonaro's supporters called for him to run for president.

Several institutions responsible for promoting human rights have called for Jair Bolsonaro to be investigated and punished. The National Movement for Human Rights demanded punishment for his statements, stating that it was "perplexed and outraged by the racist and homophobic offenses made by Jair Bolsonaro against Preta Gil, and consequently against both social groups." The Brazilian Association of Gays, Lesbians and Transsexuals called for a criminal investigation of Jair Bolsonaro on the grounds of racism and libel. UNESCO called for Bolsonaro's remarks to be investigated. Folha de S. Paulo called for him to be subjected to a political trial for discrimination and prejudice, while opposing his impeachment. The Torture Never Again group published a note repudiating Bolsonaro's speeches.

The Brazilian federal government, through the National Council to Combat Discrimination and Promote the Rights of Lesbians, Gays, Bisexuals, Transvestites and Transsexuals (CNCD/LGBT), stated that "Bolsonaro is reinforcing his homophobic, racist and sexist side, deliberately acting with postures incompatible with the decorum and ethics required of a representative of Brazilian society in the National Congress". According to Luiza Bairros, Minister of Racial Equality, Bolsonaro's statements were "an explicit case of racism". Rosana Heringer, coordinator of ActionAid, advocated punishment if he could not be prosecuted under the racism law. The Chamber's Human Rights Commission said it would investigate Bolsonaro for his speeches with discriminatory content. Eloi Ferreira de Araujo, president of the Palmares Foundation, expressed his indignation at Bolsonaro's remarks.

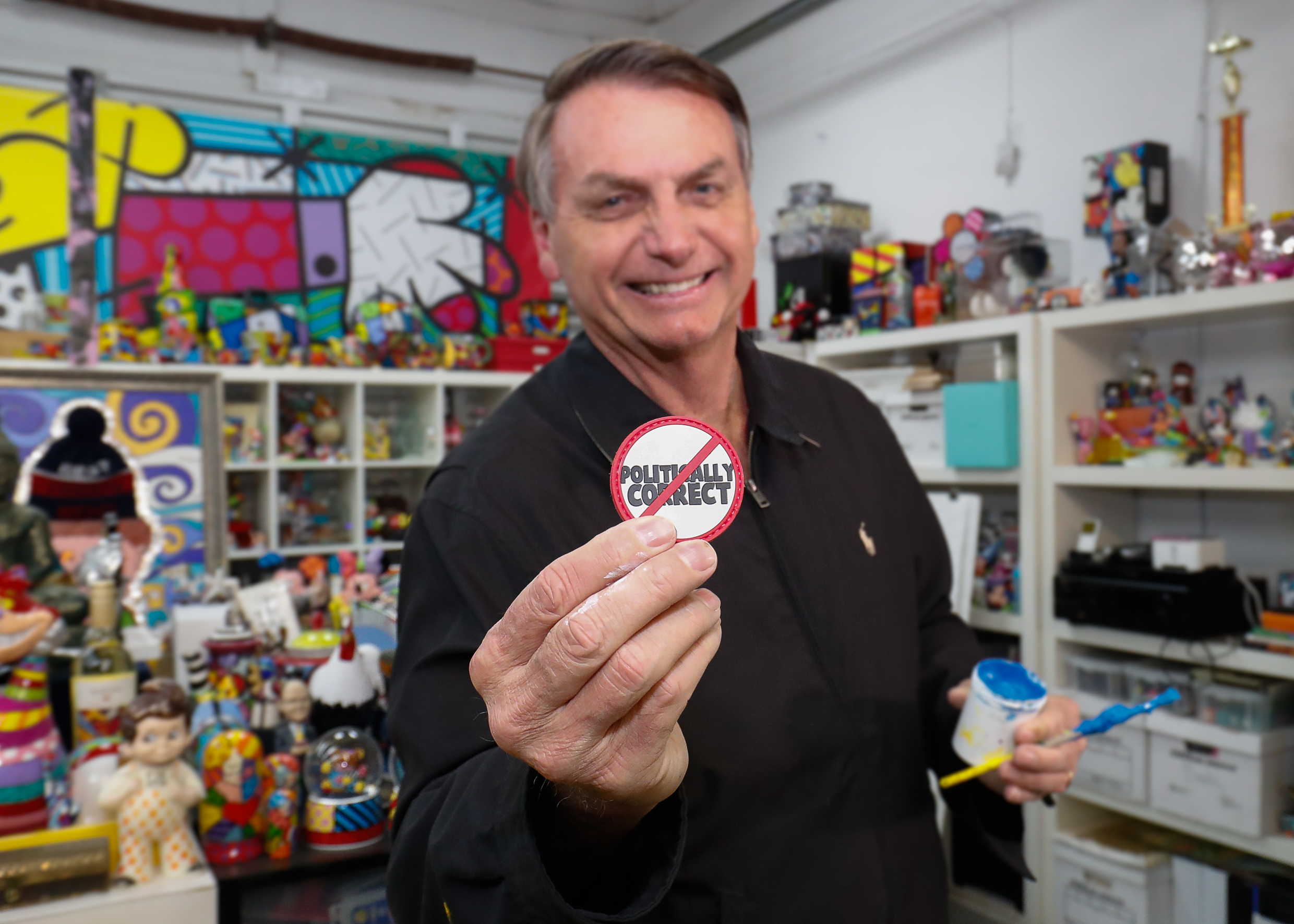
Bolsonaro holding a sign against political correctness

On April 6, 2011, Bolsonaro skipped a meeting of the Human Rights Commission because, according to his office, he was preparing a defense against accusations of racism for the television interview. On the same day, demonstrators held a protest against Bolsonaro, displaying posters with a caricature of Bolsonaro resembling Adolf Hitler and using the hashtag "#forabolsonaro" (#bolsonaroout), adopted on Twitter to promote indignation against his statements. Yann Evanovick, president of the Brazilian Union of High School Students (UBES), stated that "it is impossible for a country that is theoretically a full democracy to have prejudiced, homophobic and sexist parliamentarians like Bolsonaro". The National Union of Students and twenty other organizations sent a document to the Human Rights Commission asking for Bolsonaro to be investigated for racism. Marco Maia (PT), president of the Chamber of Deputies, said he was studying the possibility of changing the Chamber's code of ethics to allow for alternative punishments for Bolsonaro. Protesters from groups linked to UNE, indigenous, black and religious movements protested on April 7 at the Federal Chamber, comparing Bolsonaro to Hitler.

The CQC interview resulted in Bolsonaro being sued several times for breach of decorum and racism. Preta Gil filed a lawsuit against him for racism, claiming that the statements were clearly racist. On April 6, 2011, he was notified by the Chamber's Internal Affairs Department to present a defense against petitions filed by his peers notifying him of the case. The Federal Government's Council for the Defense of the Human Person decided to forward a formal complaint to the Public Prosecutor's Office about Bolsonaro's alleged racism and homophobia. The Secretariat for Racial Equality and deputies Édson Santos and Luiz Alberto, both from the PT, reiterated the Chamber's request. In 2013, an investigation was opened against Bolsonaro at the STF for allegedly racist statements made against Preta Gil, which was shelved for lack of evidence in 2015, based on the justification that the broadcaster did not make the full recording of the interview available, only the edited version.

==== Quilombolas ====
In April 2017, in a speech at the Hebraica Club in Rio de Janeiro, Bolsonaro said he would end all indigenous lands and quilombola communities in Brazil if elected in 2018. He also said he would end public funding for NGOs: "You can be sure that if I get there (presidency of the Republic) there will be no money for NGOs. If it's up to me, every citizen will have a firearm in their home. There won't be a centimeter demarcated for indigenous reserves or quilombolas." He also claimed that indigenous and quilombola reserves hinder the economy. "Where there is indigenous land, there is wealth underneath it. We have to change that." After the statement, Bolsonaro was denounced by the Federal Public Prosecutor's Office in Rio de Janeiro, which claimed that he had used insulting, prejudiced and discriminatory expressions with the aim of offending and ridiculing quilombola communities and the black population. On October 3, 2017, he was ordered to pay a fine of R$50,000 for the crime of moral damage.

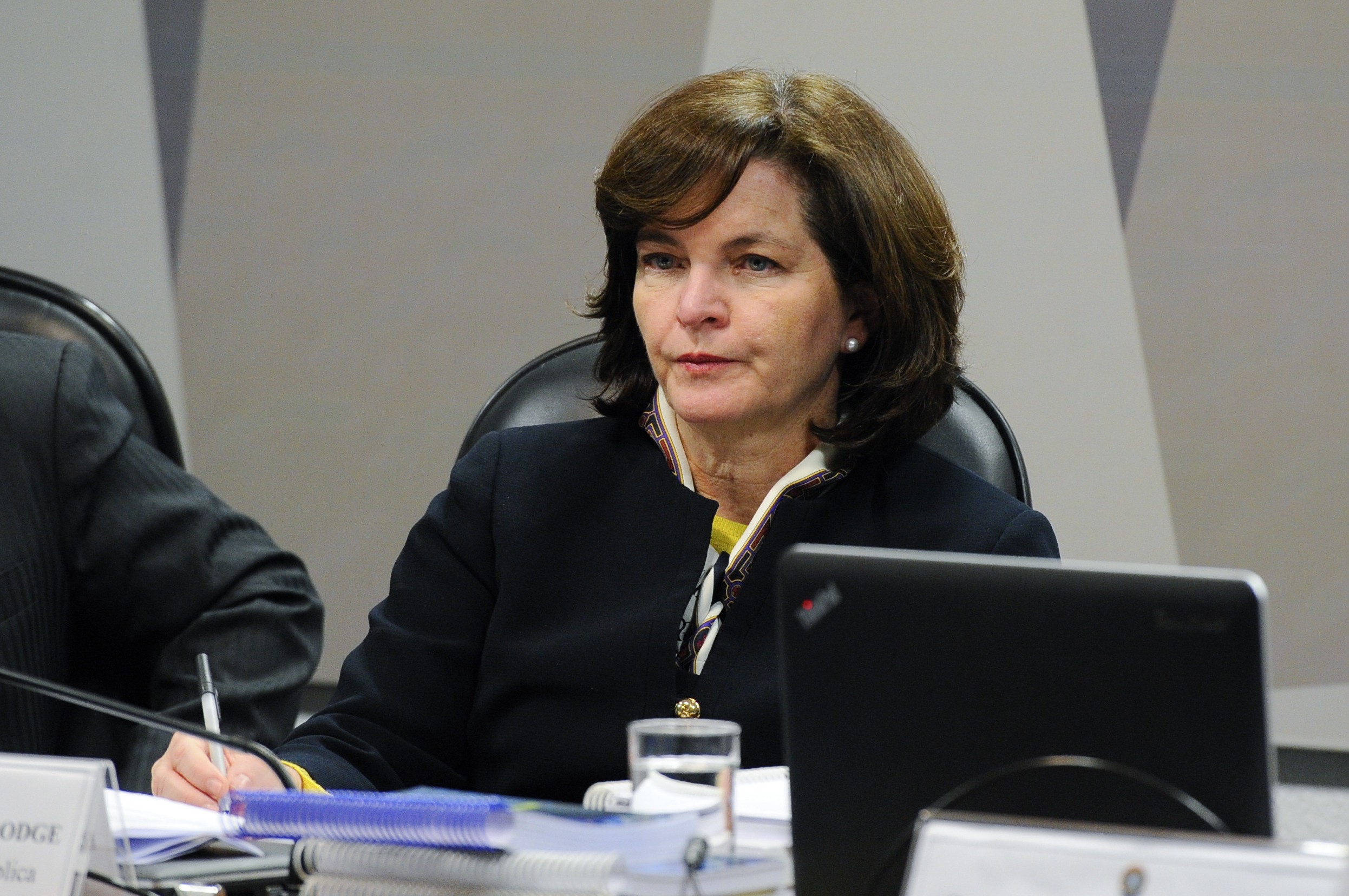
Former Prosecutor General Raquel Dodge denounced Bolsonaro for his speech on quilombolas.

On April 13, 2018, the Public Prosecutor's Office filed another complaint against Bolsonaro for the crime of racism, which is non-bailable, imprescriptible and subject to imprisonment for one to three years plus a fine. In the complaint, Prosecutor General Raquel Dodge asks him to pay R$400,000 for collective moral damages and states: "Jair Bolsonaro treated the members of quilombola communities with total contempt. He referred to them as if they were animals, using the word 'arroba'. This unacceptable manifestation is aligned with the regime of slavery, in which blacks were treated as mere merchandise, and with the idea of inequality between human beings, which is absolutely refuted by the Brazilian Constitution and by all the International Treaties and Conventions to which Brazil is a signatory, confirming equality between human beings as a universal and protected human right. Jair Bolsonaro also said, by comparison, that the Japanese are a hard-working people who don't beg. He showed that, in his view, there are individuals or peoples who are superior to others, treating quilombolas as inferior beings. These statements made by the accused, inciting xenophobic behavior and sentiment, reinforce attitudes of violence and discrimination that are prohibited by the Constitution and criminal law." The complaint was rejected by the STF on September 11 of the same year.

==== Indigenous peoples ====
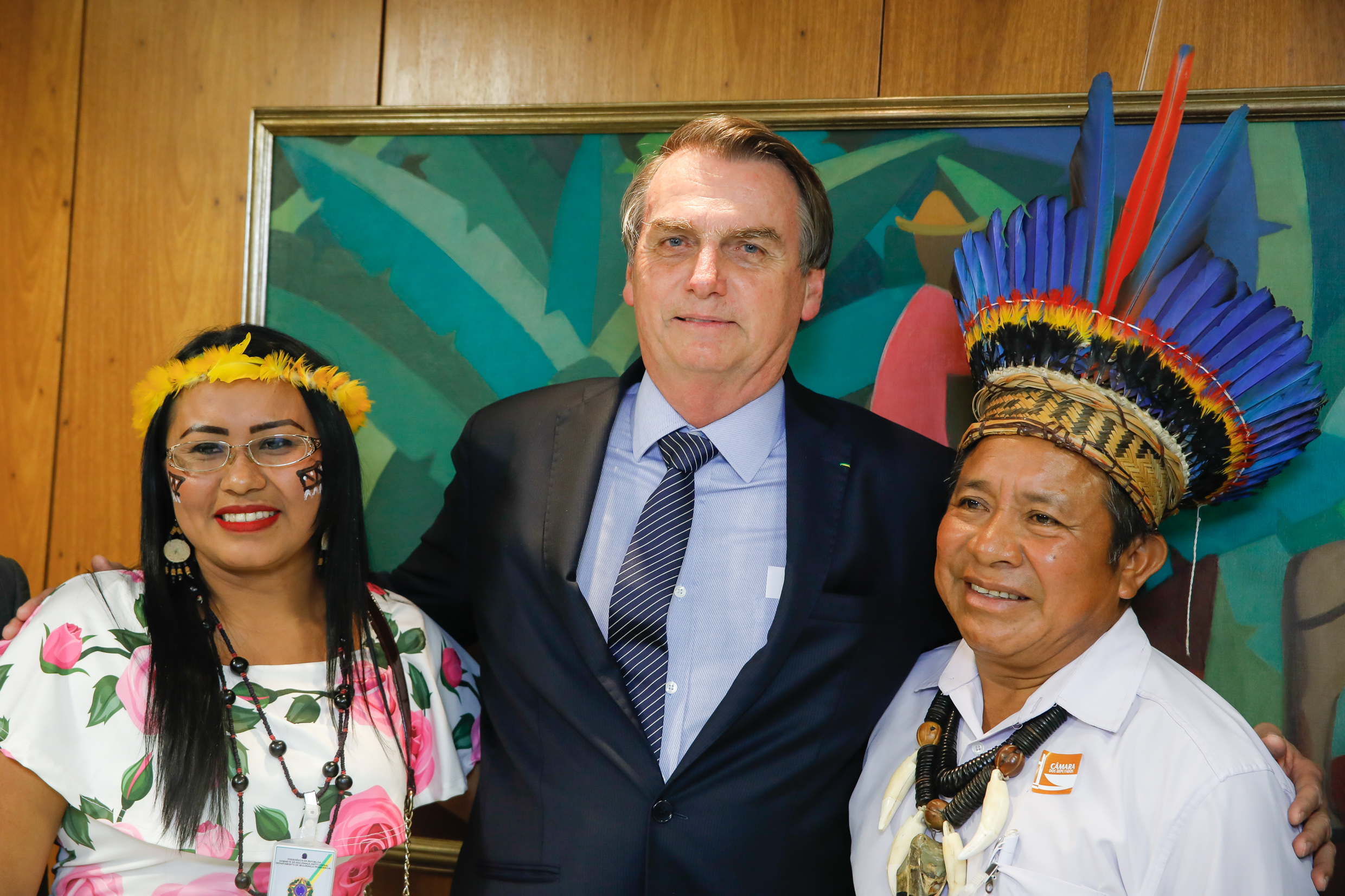
Bolsonaro next to representatives of indigenous peoples at the Planalto Palace.

Jair Bolsonaro has also questioned the Brazilian government's indigenous policy. In one of his speeches at a hearing in the Chamber of Deputies dealing with the issue in Roraima in 2004, he said that the Landless Workers' Movement (MST), "despite being well-off and made up of people who speak our language and are educated", is unable to carry out land reform, while "stinking indigenous, not educated and not speaking our language" own 12% of Brazilian land and lobby the National Congress. His comments caused great indignation in the plenary among indigenous, parliamentarians and human rights groups, who considered that his speech violated the principle of non-discrimination in the Brazilian Constitution. One of the leaders of the Sateré-Mawé people present at the public hearing threw a glass of water in Bolsonaro's direction. After being hit, he said: "He's an indigenous man who's in charge here in Brasilia, he's flown in, he's now going to eat a pork chop, have a beer, probably a whiskey, and maybe call someone to make his evening more pleasant. This is the indigenous man who comes here to talk about the indigenous reserve. He should go and eat some grass out there to maintain his origins."

During the presidency of Jair Bolsonaro(2019–2023), a series of mass deaths, famine, forced displacements and other major human rights violations took place in the Brazilian Yanomami Indigenous Territory. Such events reportedly started or were aggravated from 2019 on as a consequence of rampant exploitation of natural resources by individuals and companies with state approval, and have been frequently said to constitute a genocide against the Yanomami people. It is part of the larger ongoing genocide of Indigenous peoples in Brazil.

==== Immigrants ====
In September 2015, during an interview with the Opção newspaper in Goiás, Bolsonaro said: "I don't know what the commanders' adherence is, but if they reduce the number of Armed Forces personnel, it means fewer people on the streets to deal with the MST criminals, the Haitians, Senegalese, Bolivians and all the scum of the earth that are now arriving, including the Syrians. The scum of the earth is arriving in Brazil as if we didn't have enough problems to deal with." In a speech at the Hebraica Club in 2017, he said that "we can't open the doors to everyone". In April 2017, the Special Secretariat for Policies to Promote Racial Equality issued a statement rejecting his statements on the subject. In 2018, Bolsonaro defended the creation of "refugee camps" for Venezuelans seeking shelter in Brazil. In the same interview, when asked if he believed Dilma Rousseff would complete her second term, he wished "that she ends today, with a heart attack or cancer, [in] any way."

== Attacks on the press and fake news ==
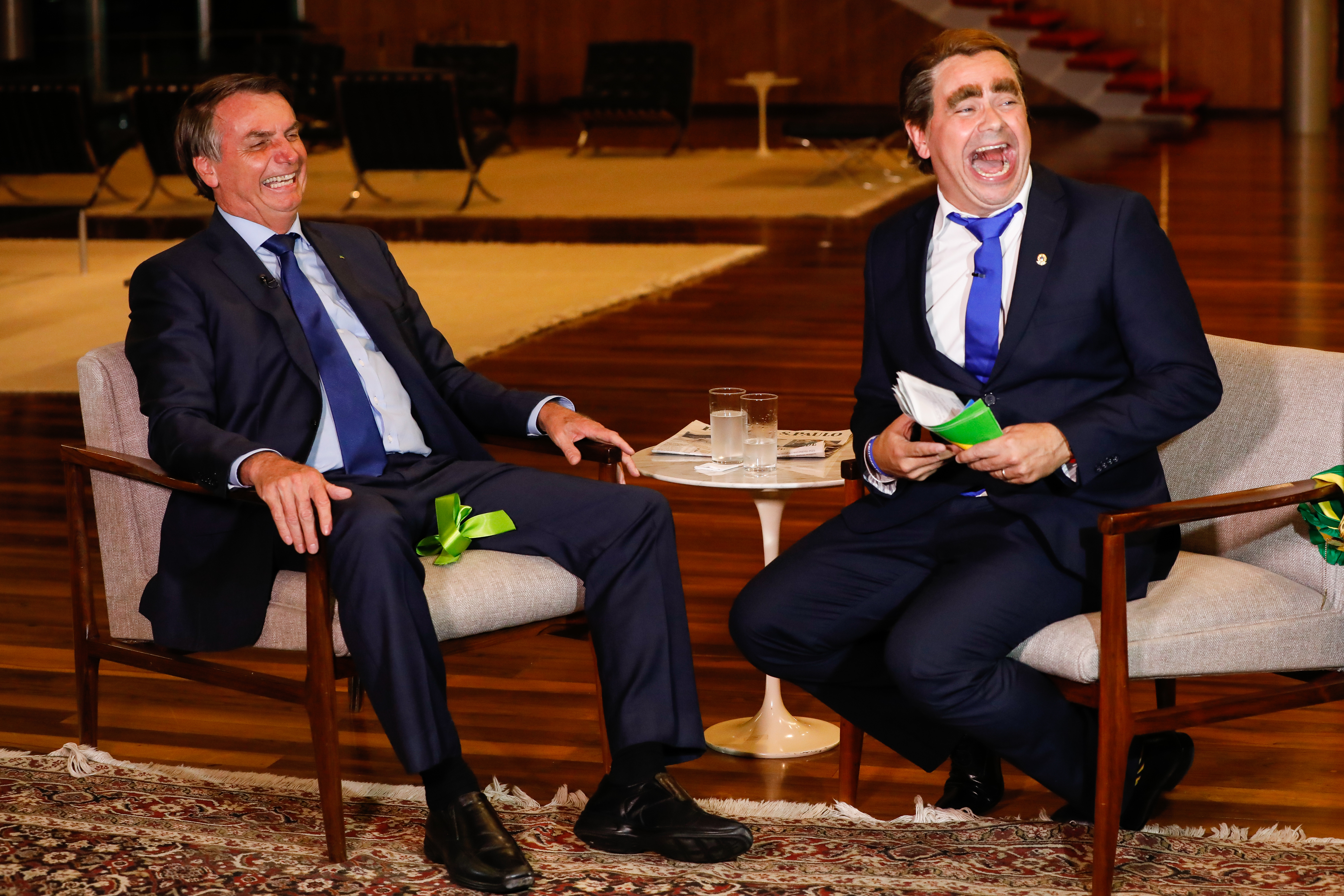
Carioca and Bolsonaro during an interview in March 2020

Bolsonaro criticizes the press and the mainstream media, and constantly attacks reporters and critics of his government. A survey by Reporters Without Borders conducted in September 2020 found 53 attacks, including 21 from him. In 2020, Bolsonaro invited Márvio Lúcio, also known as Carioca, to answer journalists' questions when the GDP of 1.1% for his first year in office was released. Carioca offered bananas to the reporters, who stopped asking about the GDP after Bolsonaro insisted on not answering the questions.

On October 19, 2018, a lawsuit filed by the Workers' Party (PT) was accepted by the Superior Electoral Court (TSE), with Justice Jorge Mussi as rapporteur. The lawsuit was based on a complaint by the Folha de S. Paulo newspaper, which claimed that companies paid up to R$12 million in contracts for the mass sending of content against Lula (PT) on the WhatsApp application. Based on the allegation that there were practices prohibited by electoral law, such as donations from legal entities and the purchase of user registrations, the PT asked that Bolsonaro be declared ineligible for abuse of economic power and misuse of the media. According to the PT, Bolsonaro's campaign benefited from the proliferation of fake news on social networks. He used Facebook to deny involvement in malicious schemes and accused Folha de S. Paulo of "working for his rival" in the second round, Fernando Haddad.

According to a report in Época magazine, a video production company based only on paper in Petrolina received R$240,000 to produce videos for TV and social media for Bolsonaro's campaign. The amount corresponds to around 20% of the total spent on his campaign. The address of the production company, called Mosqueteiros Filmes Ltda, was an empty house with an advertisement for sale whose owners claimed it was rented by the production company.

In the 2018 elections, the newspaper O Dia published a satire in which Jair Bolsonaro's head is inserted into a swastika with the question: "and no one will say anything?" He filed a lawsuit against the newspaper. The judge in the case ruled in favor of O Dia, arguing that Bolsonaro was not offended when his photo was circulated next to a person dressed up as what appears to be Adolf Hitler. Following his victory in the 2018 elections, the Brazilian Association of Investigative Journalism (Abraji) issued a statement about his statements: "Abraji receives with apprehension the statements made by the president-elect, Jair Bolsonaro (PSL), regarding the press in the last 48 hours, between the confirmation of his victory at the polls and his first interviews with Brazilian television stations. Respect for the Constitution - to which Bolsonaro will take a solemn oath of obedience on January 1, 2019 - is not complete when the press becomes the object of attacks and threats."

In March 2019, alongside other associations, the National Association of Newspapers (ANJ) condemned the attitude of Jair Bolsonaro, who helped spread fake news on his social network: "ABERT, ANER and ANJ point out that the attempt to make the press out to be the enemy ignores the role of independent journalism in monitoring and overseeing the actions of public authorities."

At a press conference held in May 2019, journalist Marina Dias asked Bolsonaro about the cut in funding for education and he responded by differentiating between a cut and contingency. When Marina again questioned whether it was a cut, he got angry and declared: "Are you from Folha? (…) First, you people from Folha de S. Paulo have to go back to a good college and do good journalism. That's what Folha has to do, and not hire anyone to be a journalist, to sow discord and ask nonsense around and publish disgusting things." Bolsonaro later posted a video of the episode on Twitter and Facebook in which he says: "(…) Here in the United States, a Folha reporter didn't know the difference between cutting and contingency. We explained." Abraji said that by "stimulating an environment of confrontation and intimidation against journalists and media outlets, Bolsonaro is moving away from the democratic commitment he made when he took office, and is closer to authoritarian rulers, of various ideological hues, who seek to demonize the press because they see it as an obstacle to their power projects. Whenever there are restrictions on freedom of the press and freedom of expression, society is the loser."

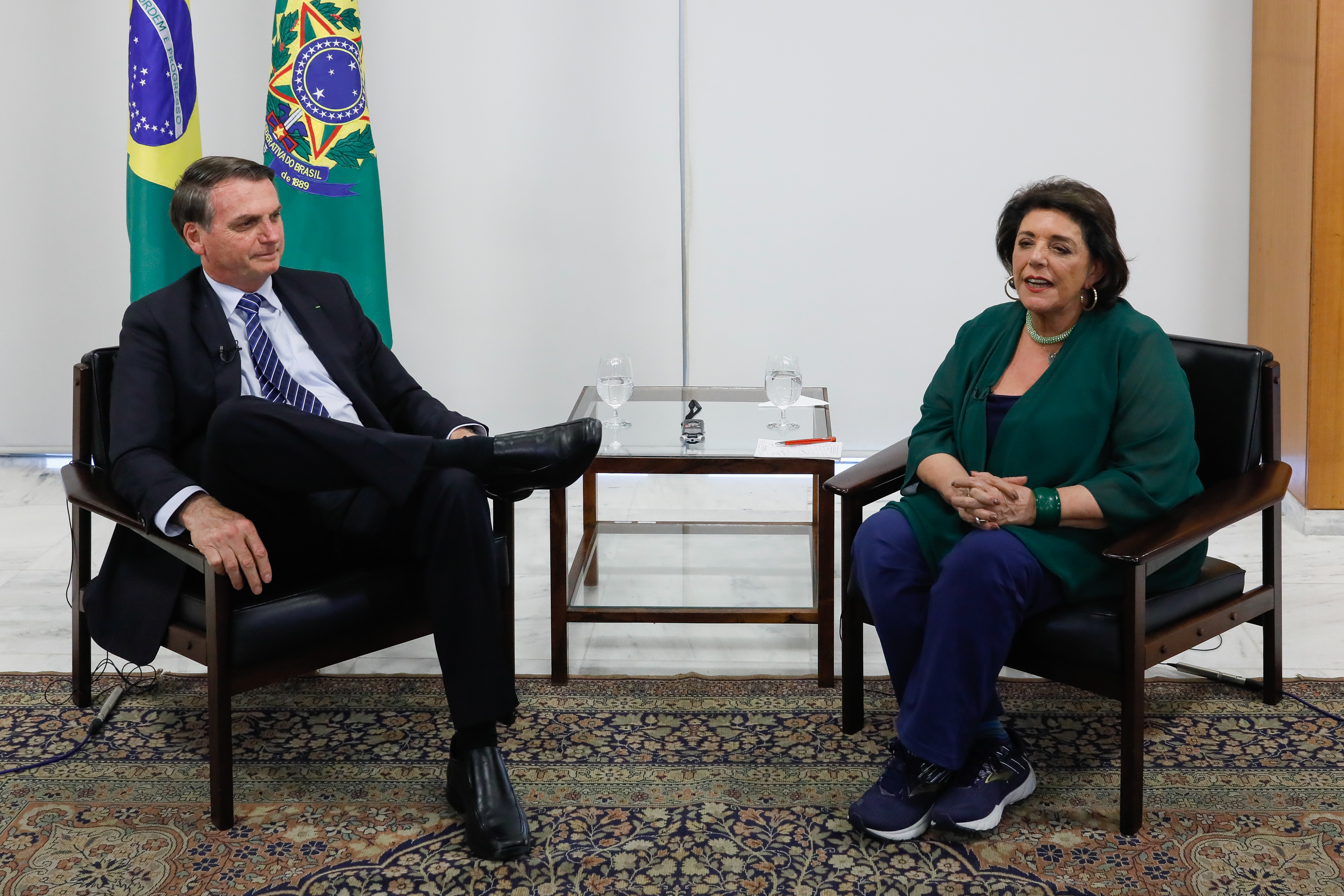
Jair Bolsonaro during an interview with Leda Nagle in August 2019.

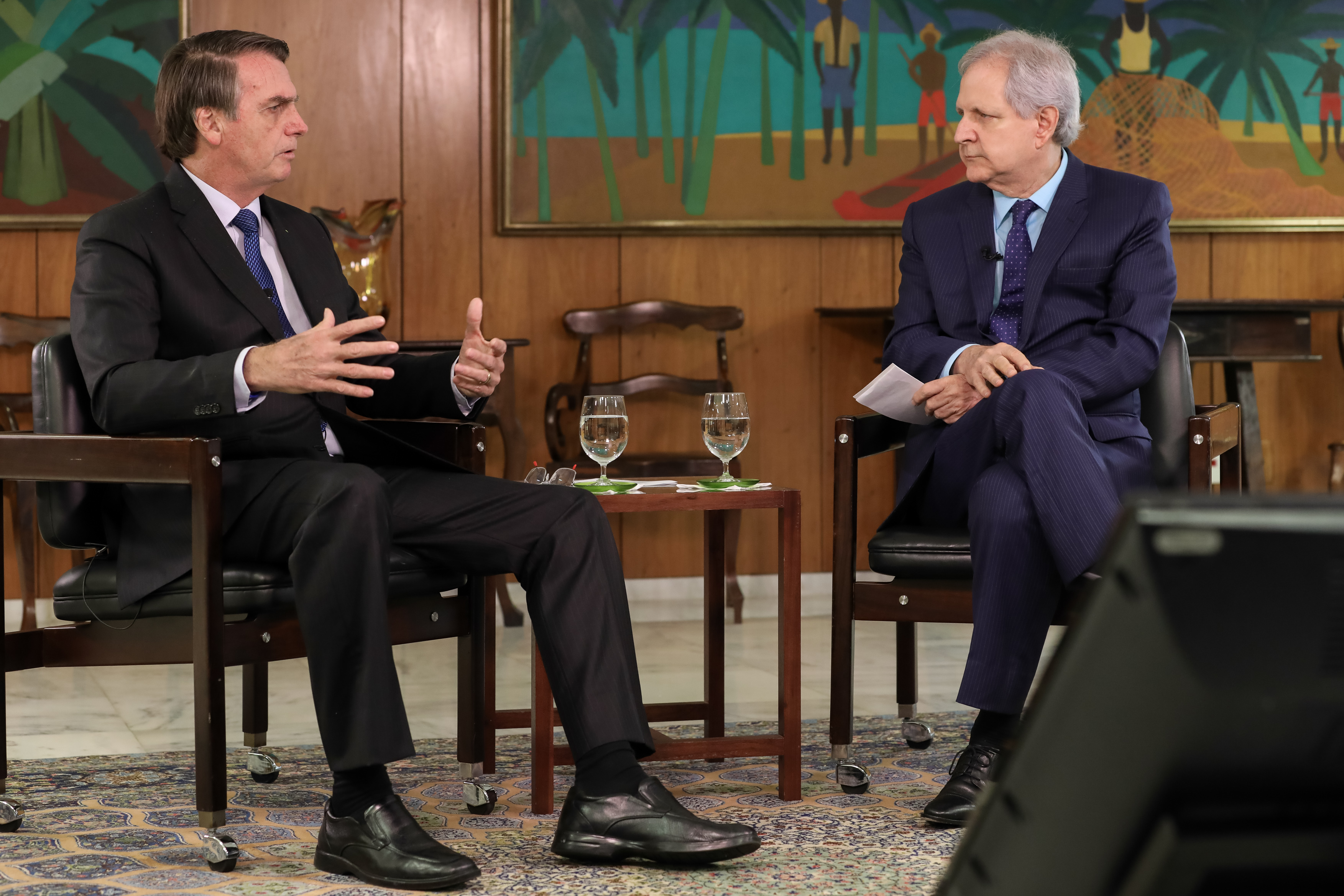
Jair Bolsonaro during an interview with Augusto Nunes in April 2019

In July 2019, he commented that journalist Miriam Leitão was creating a "lying drama" about the torture she suffered during Brazil's military dictatorship. He also accused her of attempting to "impose the dictatorship in Brazil through armed struggle". Also in 2019, Miriam Leitão's participation in the 13th Jaraguá do Sul Book Fair was canceled. According to the event's organizers, it would not be possible to guarantee her safety after mobilizing a protest by a Jair Bolsonaro sympathizer. In August 2019, the ANJ condemned Bolsonaro's remarks that the press "is ending" and the newspaper Valor Econômico "will close".

In September 2019, ANJ said that the provisional measure (MP) 896 proposed by Jair Bolsonaro is an attack on press freedom. It also reported that the MP will lead to a lack of transparency in public acts and bypass Congress, which is responsible for legislating on the subject. It also eliminates the requirement for official public bidding documents to be published in widely circulated newspapers. The government claimed that the measure was aimed at cutting an "unjustified expense for the public coffers". On another occasion, Jair Bolsonaro said that the MP was a response to the press being critical of his government. Justice Gilmar Mendes of the Supreme Federal Court (STF) suspended MP 896 on October 18, 2019, until it was voted on in Congress. He argued that the MP violated press freedom.

In November 2019, the National Federation of Journalists (FENAJ) reported that Jair Bolsonaro had already accumulated 99 attacks on the press in Brazil, mainly directed at Rede Globo. In December 2019, a survey by Piauí magazine's Agência Lupa showed that 64.5% of the occasions Bolsonaro used the word "fake news" were with the intention of attacking the press. In January 2020, when FENAJ released a new survey showing that Bolsonaro was responsible for most of the attacks on the press, he responded ironically on social media with laughter and said: "They took the average IQ of the press. It was 58". In 2020, the Brazilian Association of Investigative Journalism, Conectas Human Rights, the Vladimir Herzog Institute and the Intervozes collective denounced some of Bolsonaro's attacks on journalists at the United Nations (UN).

In April 2020, Reporters Without Borders announced the quarterly release of analyses of Bolsonaro's attacks on the press. In the first part, the organization reported on how he attacked and tried to silence the press alongside family members. In the same month, Folha de S. Paulo compiled some of the false statements made by Bolsonaro since his inauguration, and Agência Pública published an investigation showing how the public positioning of Bolsonaro and allies against social isolation was used as a strategy to remove Minister of Health Luiz Henrique Mandetta from office using false information on social media. In early May 2020, journalist Bruno Boghossian noted that Bolsonaro was forcing friction against the STF to divert public attention from political interference in Federal Police. The following month, Veja magazine listened to several experts to analyze the way Bolsonaro used speeches in 80 days of the COVID-19 pandemic. One of the examples cited in the report was that of John F. Kennedy, who mentioned Winston Churchill, who put speeches ahead of war.

On June 27, 2020, Folha de S.Paulo published in an article some of the phrases that bring Bolsonaro closer to the generals of the dictatorship. On July 7, 2020, the Brazilian Press Association (ABI) declared that it would file a criminal complaint with the Supreme Court against Bolsonaro after he claimed to be infected with COVID-19 and approached journalists for an interview. During the conversation, he removed the mask from his face. As a result, the Union of Professional Journalists of the Federal District has asked media outlets to suspend their coverage of the Planalto Palace. In the same month, Bolsonaro had told the press more than 46 times that the Supreme Court was preventing him from fighting the COVID-19 pandemic in Brazil, which is false.

Bolsonaro's undemocratic political attitudes as president of the republic have been reported and criticized in opinion articles written by the editorials of major newspapers in Brazil. In November 2019, the Folha de S. Paulo editorial stated: "Jair Bolsonaro does not understand and will never understand the limits that the Republic imposes on the exercise of the Presidency. He is a personality who combines levity and authoritarianism. (…) The Planalto Palace is not an extension of the house in Barra da Tijuca that Bolsonaro keeps in Rio de Janeiro. (…) The rules of the democratic rule of law will then have to be imposed on him from the outside, like the limits given to a child." On February 26, 2020, Estado de S. Paulo said: "Bolsonaro seems to be trying to build a military-inspired populist regime, very much to the taste of those who miss the dictatorship and reminiscent of the government of General Velasco Alvarado in Peru, who harassed parties because he considered them part of the oligarchic system." The newspaper O Globo said that Bolsonaro has been acting "like the head of a radical faction, a gang, going beyond all the limits of democratic coexistence. He disregards the division of powers established by the Constitution, threatens Congress, the Judiciary and, therefore, its Supreme Court."

On January 18, 2021, Jair Bolsonaro blocked the information verification agency Aos Fatos on Twitter. According to Vitor Blotta, a professor at the University of São Paulo who coordinates the Journalism, Law and Freedom group (ECA-USP), politicians who use their social networks for government functions should not block journalists, because according to the Federal Constitution, advertising the programs, works, services and campaigns of public bodies is the duty of the public administration. On May 17, 2021, Aos Fatos reported that Bolsonaro had made 3,000 false or distorted statements since the beginning of his term, with a total average of 3.4 statements per day. It was also published in early January 2022 that throughout 2021 Bolsonaro made an average of 6.9 false or distorted statements per day. During the COVID-19 pandemic, there have been 1,278 declarations since he took office.

On October 21, 2021, during his live internet broadcasts, Bolsonaro used a printed newspaper as a source to claim that immunized people are more likely to be infected with AIDS. The COVID-19 CPI included his statement in the report and transferred new evidence about Bolsonaro's alleged crimes to STF Minister Alexandre de Moraes for the Fake News Inquiry. Minister Luís Roberto Barroso of the STF was chosen to be the rapporteur of the inquiry filed by the PSOL and PDT parties.

The live was taken down by Facebook and YouTube for violating health disinformation policies against COVID-19. Robert Gallo, one of the discoverers of HIV, denied his statement in an interview with Correio Braziliense. Bolsonaro based his comment on an article in the Exame newspaper reporting on the risk of using Adenoviridae number 5 in vaccines, given that in 2007, similar vaccines containing the virus were created and increased the risk of HIV contamination. In the same article, it is reported that the vaccines being manufactured did not contain adenovirus number 5, and that the study was a warning to avoid using this virus in vaccines.

== COVID-19 pandemic ==
At the beginning of the pandemic, Luiz Henrique Mandetta, the Minister of Health, followed the guidelines of the World Health Organization (WHO) by adopting social distancing with the aim of "flattening the curve" of contagion and preventing the collapse of the health system. However, Jair Bolsonaro's response was widely criticized after he minimized the effects of the disease, defended treatments without proven efficacy and postponed the purchase of vaccines, as well as clashing with governors for disagreeing with social distancing measures. As a result, the Federal Senate set up the COVID-19 CPI, a Parliamentary Inquiry Commission to investigate the actions and omissions of public authorities in combating the pandemic.

=== COVID kit ===
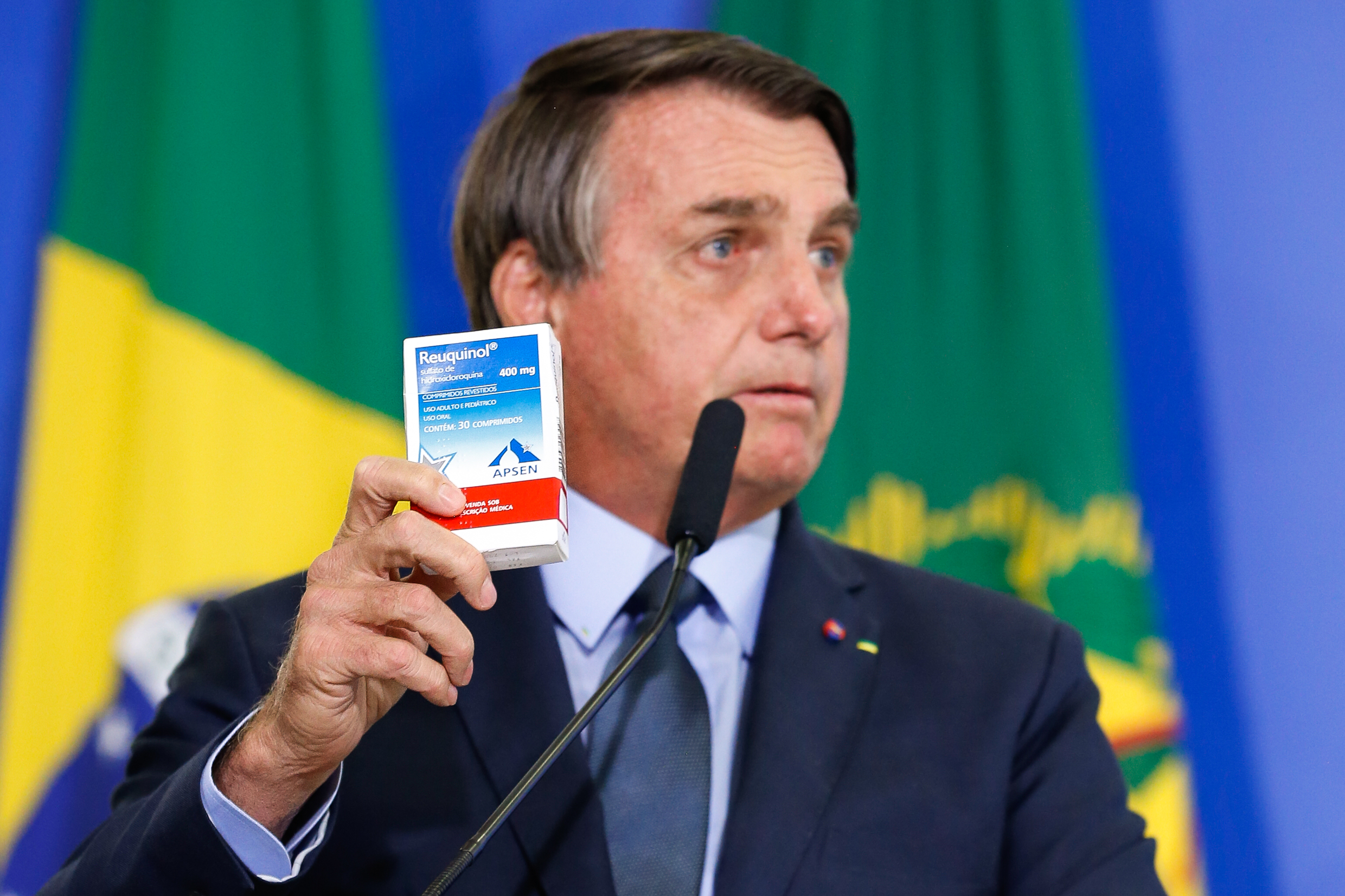
Jair Bolsonaro holding a box of chloroquine in September 2020.

The COVID kit, often referred to as early treatment, is a designation used to describe the negationist approach promoted by the government led by Jair Bolsonaro and his supporters regarding the use of drugs that have no proven efficacy in the treatment of COVID-19. It includes advocating the use of drugs such as chloroquine, hydroxychloroquine, ivermectin, azithromycin, bromhexine, nitazoxanide, anticoagulants and zinc supplements.

In March 2020, chloroquine emerged as a possible treatment of COVID-19 based on two studies of questionable quality. Former US President Donald Trump endorsed one of these studies, defying the recommendations of the Food and Drug Administration (FDA), which led to the politicization of the issue. In Brazil, Jair Bolsonaro adopted the same discourse. In subsequent months, the Brazilian government launched measures to promote chloroquine and hydroxychloroquine as treatments for COVID-19, which included the ordering of production, coordination of distribution and a considerable expenditure of approximately R$90 million on the acquisition of the medicines. The Ministry of Health, under the leadership of Eduardo Pazuello, has also expanded the use of these substances to treat mild cases of the disease.

The Covid kit created a false sense of security among the population, suggesting that life could return to its previous state without the need for social isolation measures. The widespread use of the drugs, along with their potential side effects, has caused significant damage to the kidneys and liver of many users. The initiative resulted in an increase in the number of infections, hospitalizations and deaths, and was criticized by organizations and health experts for its lack of scientific basis and the potential dangerousness associated with its use. It has also become the subject of lawsuits and investigations related to possible favoritism involving public and private agents in search of financial gain.

== Environment ==
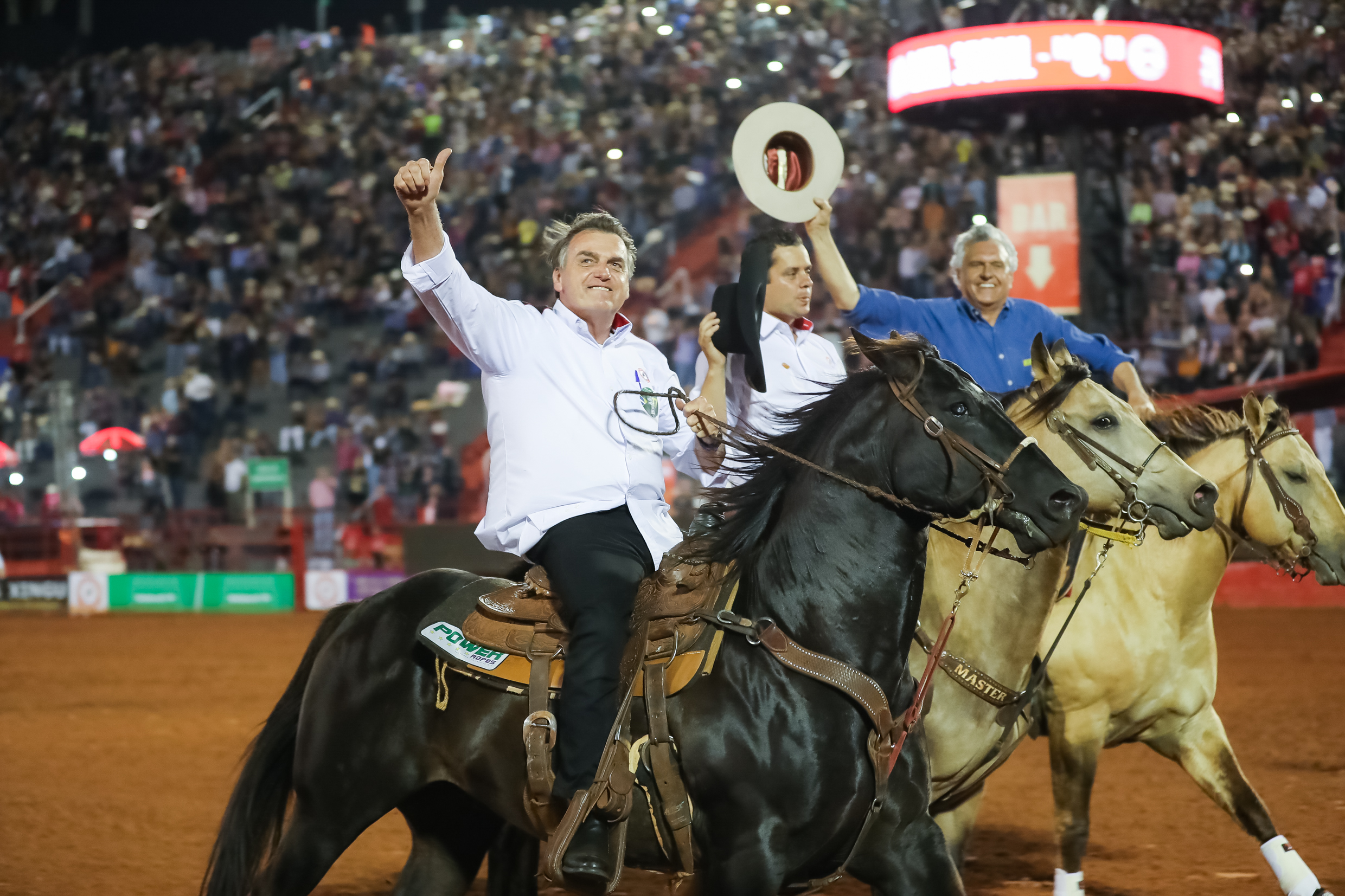
Jair Bolsonaro during the opening ceremony of the rodeo at the 64th Festa do Peão de Barretos, in São Paulo.

In October 2016, Bolsonaro took part in an event in Brasilia in support of the release of vaquejada by the Supreme Federal Court (STF).

=== Agriculture and climate change ===
According to The Washington Post, "Bolsonaro is a powerful defender of agribusiness … and is likely to favor profits over conservation … and is likely to favor profits over preservation … He has chafed at foreign pressure to protect [the Amazon rainforest] and has told international nonprofits like the World Wildlife Fund that he will not tolerate their agendas in Brazil. He has also strongly opposed the demarcation of indigenous reserves for native peoples. His advisors say he plans to expand nuclear and hydroelectric power generation in the Amazon." He considered the possibility of abolishing the Ministry of the Environment, but backed down. However, the Environmental Education department of the Ministry of the Environment was incorporated into the Ecotourism Secretariat, while the Brazilian Forestry Service was transferred from the Ministry of the Environment to Agriculture.

In April 2019, Bolsonaro was selected by Time magazine as one of the 100 most influential people in the world. The magazine describes him as a complex character, who would represent a break in a decade-long sequence of corruption and the "best chance in a generation" to pass economic reforms that can tame the growing debt. It also highlights his controversial character, describing him as a symbol of "toxic masculinity" and "homophobic ultraconservatism", which could even reverse Brazil's progress on climate change.

=== Amazon fires ===
During August 2019, fires in the Amazon rainforest became the focus of intense criticism of Bolsonaro's rainforest policies. In 2019, Brazil registered more than 72,000 fires, an increase of 84% compared to the same period in 2018. In five days in August, there were 7,746 fires. The alarm led Angela Merkel to support Emmanuel Macron's request to put the Amazon fires on the agenda of the G7 summit, after he said the situation represented an international crisis. In response, Jair Bolsonaro accused Macron of having a "colonialist mentality" and told him to stay out of Brazilian politics. Subsequently, Bolsonaro's government launched a global public relations campaign to try to convince the world that everything was under control. He said "in my view it may have been boosted by NGOs, because they lost money, what is the intention? To bring problems to Brazil", pointing out that Leonardo DiCaprio gave the money to burn the Amazon.

== Other controversies ==
=== Economy ===
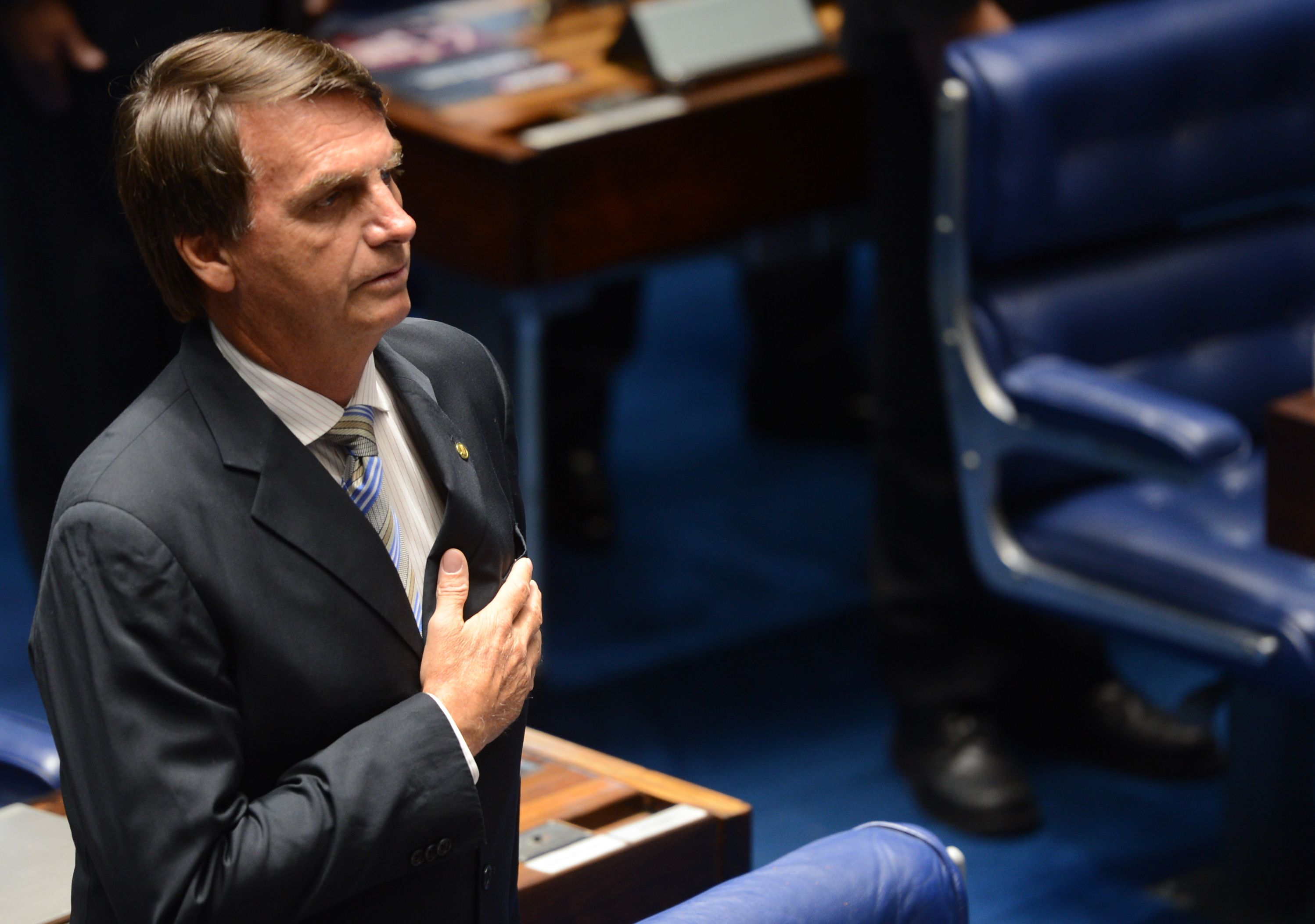
Bolsonaro in 2014 during the promulgation of Constitutional Amendment 77, which allows military doctors to work in the SUS.

During the governments of Fernando Henrique Cardoso and Luiz Inácio Lula da Silva, Bolsonaro defended developmentalist and anti-liberal economic positions, and voted with the Workers' Party (PT) on different economic issues. In 2000, when explaining to presenter Jô Soares why he advocated the firing squad for former President Fernando Henrique, he said that "it's barbaric to privatize Vale and telecommunications, to hand over our oil reserves to foreign capital".

Since 2016, Bolsonaro has supported liberal economic measures. He voted to expand the pre-salt layer, said that the "free market is the mother of freedom", and, in an interview, stated that "as much as possible should be privatized" and that he was only opposed to the way Vale was privatized. In an interview with journalist Mariana Godoy, when asked about his position on the macroeconomic structure, he replied that his economic team would be the ones to talk about the issue for him in the future. In November 2017, during an interview, Bolsonaro said that if he became president of Brazil, he would appoint liberal economist Paulo Guedes to the Ministry of Finance. In a 2018 interview, he said that he "wouldn't like" to privatize Petrobras, but that he would do so if he "couldn't find [another] solution". In May 2018, he defended the flexibilization of labor rights and said: "Little by little, the population will understand that fewer rights and employment is better than all rights and unemployment."

=== Science and technology ===
During his campaign, Bolsonaro proposed eliminating the Ministries of Science and Technology and the Environment. The budget submitted at the beginning of 2019 maintained support of around 3 billion, which is around 45% lower than funding in 2017. In March, the government announced a 42% budget freeze for the Ministry of Science and Communication, leaving it with only R$2.9 billion for the rest of the year. On July 19, Bolsonaro accused National Institute for Space Research (INPE) of lying about the figures and suggested that his government had the right to approve INPE's scientific data before it was released to the public. Ricardo Galvão, an MIT-trained physicist, criticized Bolsonaro's "vile and cowardly attitude"

In June, he suspended the release of R$8 billion from the education, science and technology budgets as part of austerity measures, leaving thousands of researchers without research grants. In April, the number of visas granted to Brazilians for extraordinary ability, or those with higher degrees, rose to 159% in 2018 and 408% in 2017. The current exodus includes "doctors, nutritionists, engineers, commercial pilots, IT specialists, architects, economists, journalists and entrepreneurs".

=== Birth control ===
Bolsonaro provoked considerable controversy for public statements made in July 2008, when he proposed providing the poorest with birth control methods by suggesting that they were poorly educated to understand family planning education. He stated:

I would like Brazil to have a family planning program. It's not even worth talking about education when most of these [poor] people aren't prepared to be educated, so they won't educate themselves. Only strict birth control can save us from chaos. An educated man and woman would hardly want an extra child for the sole purpose of engaging in a welfare program (as it is today). We need to adopt a strict birth control policy. We can no longer make demagogic speeches, proposing laws and means of government to support these poor people who are increasingly proliferating throughout the country. […] People who aren't prepared to have children shouldn't have them. That's what I stand for and I'm not worried about getting votes in the future. It's past time to discuss a policy to curb this demographic explosion, otherwise we'll continue to vote in this Chamber only on issues such as Bolsa Família, loans for the poor, gas vouchers, etc. [Birth control] Methods have to be provided for those who, unfortunately, are ignorant and don't have the means to control their children. Because we [as the upper middle class] are able to control our own. Poor people can't control [theirs].

On August 9, 2019, when answering a question about the possibility of development with environmental preservation, Bolsonaro said: "You just have to stop eating a little less. When it comes to environmental pollution, you just have to poop every other day and it improves our lives a lot too, right?" He also pointed out that 70 million people are born in the world every year and then defended a family planning policy as a way of combating pollution. "It's not control, you'll see on the front page of Folha tomorrow that I'm saying there has to be birth control. It's family planning. People who have more culture have fewer children. I'm an exception to the rule, I have five, right? But, as a rule, that's it," he said.

=== Professional associations ===
Jair Bolsonaro is against the OAB exam, the test required for law graduates to practice law. In 2007, when he was a federal deputy, he proposed a bill to abolish the exam. At the end of 2018, when he had already been elected to the presidency, he made a statement saying that making the exam compulsory would turn law graduates into "luxury law firm boys". The OAB issued a statement claiming that the exam is "an important means of gauging the quality of law teaching", and that it is common practice in several countries. In 2020, Bolsonaro accused the exam of being a "nickel-and-dime scam", and that if it were up to him, "the OAB card would not be required to practice law".

In 2019, the Ministry of the Economy drafted a constitutional amendment (PEC) to end the obligation for professionals to register with professional association, establishing that the regulation of professions "will only take place if there is a risk of concrete damage to life, health, safety or social order". The OAB issued a statement saying that the PEC "takes away one of the most important instruments for defending society in professional supervision", and that "it is essentially an attack on mechanisms that protect citizens". In August 2019, the Parliamentary Front in Support of Professional Councils, composed of 200 deputies and opposed to the PEC, was created. At the end of the year, the proposal was withdrawn by the government according to Federal Deputy Rogério Correia (PT-MG). The PEC's rapporteur, Federal Deputy Édio Lopes (PL-RR), said that a new proposal would be sent to Congress with a "more conciliatory" tone regarding the interests of the government and the professional councils.

=== Golden shower controversy ===
On March 5, 2019, Bolsonaro published a pornographic video on his Twitter account showing a man inserting his finger into his anus and bending down for someone else to urinate on him. Bolsonaro suggested that this was something common at Brazilian Carnival. The next day, he posted the question: "O que é golden shower?" ("What is golden shower?"). The term refers to sexual acts that involve urinating on one's partner. The post was criticized by both Bolsonaro's supporters and critics, and several users reported that they would report the video to Twitter for inappropriate content. Some users noted that Bolsonaro had made public topics that he himself had always considered inappropriate for mass circulation.

The question published by Bolsonaro had international repercussions and was reported in the US newspaper The New York Times, the British newspapers The Independent and The Guardian, Paraguay's Última Hora, Argentina's Infobae, Mexico's Excelsior, Spain's El País and France's Le Monde. On March 19, the lawyers of the pair who appeared in the video filed a writ of mandamus with the Supreme Federal Court (STF), demanding that Bolsonaro delete the publications. Two days later, the posts were deleted.

In June 2019, Folha de S. Paulo published the article "De 'golden shower' a piada com japoneses, obsessão fálica marca Bolsonaro" ("From 'golden shower' to joke with Japanese, phallic obsession marks Bolsonaro"), in which experts commented on Bolsonaro's fixation with genitals and sexuality. Psychoanalyst and columnist Contardo Calligaris commented: "If Bolsonaro was appalled by that situation, it's because something resonates with him. Not that he fantasized about doing it [the golden shower], but the possible sexual dimension of it appeared to him somewhere to the point of arousing him." In July 2021, Carlos José Marques, editorial director, evaluated Bolsonaro's language, saying: "His expressions are abject by nature, from the anthological 'golden shower', which he greeted as soon as he took office […] From the 'golden shower' to the personalized 'poop' on himself, it was a scatological succession of foul language and mental garbage that assaults and causes disgust."

=== Venezuelan women controversy ===
In an interview with the FEAT. Podcast on October 14, 2022, Bolsonaro said that he "got in the mood" when he saw girls between fourteen and fifteen years old riding by on a motorcycle in São Sebastião, an administrative region of the Federal District. He also implied that they were prostitutes. The incident took place on April 10, 2021, and the video had a wide repercussion on social media. Some comments on Twitter linked the president's speech to pedophilia, since the girls are underage. The term "Bolsonaro Pedófilo" ("Bolsonaro Pedophile") reached the top of the most commented subjects on the platform. Opponents also questioned why Bolsonaro didn't call in the Federal Public Prosecutor's Office, the Federal Police or the Guardianship Council when he saw teenagers in a situation of suspected child prostitution. Several politicians and personalities repudiated the statements.

== Ineligibility ==
News about the meeting held at the Alvorada Palace with foreign ambassadors on July 18, 2022. Source: TV BrasilGov

Before his election to the presidency, Jair Bolsonaro became a consistent critic of Brazil's voting machine. In 2015, when he was a federal deputy, he drafted a constitutional amendment, approved by the Chamber of Deputies, which provided for printed ballots in Brazil. Later, the amendment was rejected by the Supreme Court and not implemented in the 2018 elections, based on the understanding that it could cause a risk of a breach of secrecy and freedom of choice, due to the possibility of poll workers having to intervene in case of printing failure. During the 2022 presidential elections, Bolsonaro and his supporters adopted the tactic of questioning the electronic ballot boxes in order to challenge the legitimacy of the elections if they were defeated.

On July 18, 2022, during a meeting with ambassadors, Jair Bolsonaro spread conspiracy theories about the electronic ballot boxes and repeated untrue statements made in previous years and previously contested by electoral bodies. Among the assertions denied by the press and the Superior Electoral Court (TSE), he claimed that a hacker had access to the TSE system and could manipulate the electronic ballot boxes; that the TSE did not collaborate with the Federal Police investigation; that an audit, hired by the Brazilian Social Democracy Party (PSDB) in 2014, concluded that the electronic ballot boxes cannot be audited; that international observers could not guarantee the legitimacy of the election; that the re-totaling of votes would be done by a third-party company; that the TSE did not accept suggestions from the Armed Forces; that the electronic ballot box would complete the vote with the number "3", as soon as the voter pressed the number "1", in order for the vote "13" to be counted for the opposition candidate.

He also tried to delegitimize the TSE and claimed that Justice Fachin was a lawyer for the Landless Workers' Movement (MST). According to The New York Times, the meeting raised international concern about a possible coup d'état in Brazil, as Bolsonaro suggested that the solution to the problems mentioned would be to intensify the military's involvement in the electoral process. The meeting was broadcast on public broadcaster TV Brasil and on his profiles on social media. The New York Times compared Bolsonaro's tactics to Donald Trump's stance in the 2020 US presidential election, when he tried to delegitimize the vote before it took place.

== Military crisis ==
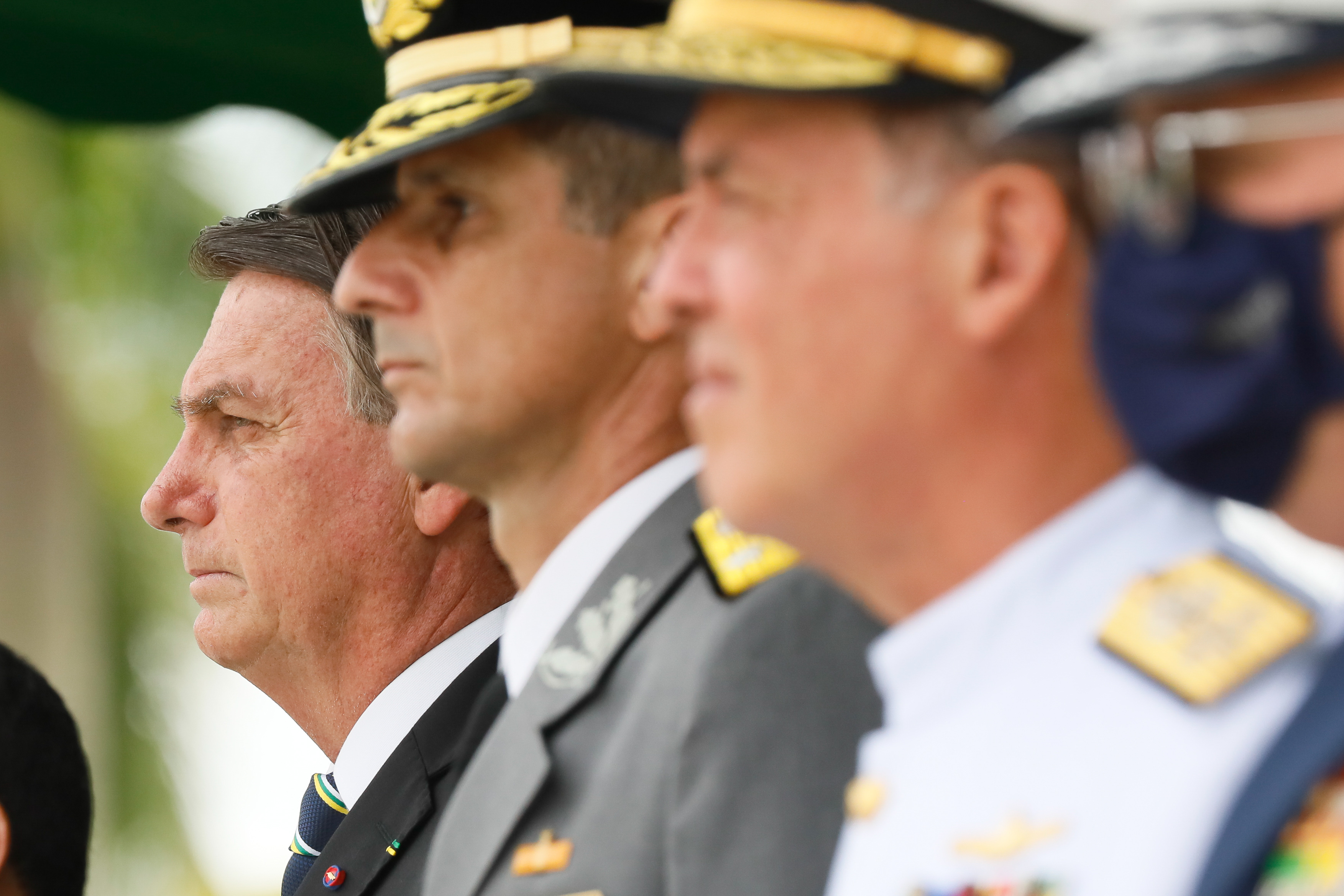
President Jair Bolsonaro and military authorities in December 2020.

In March 2021, a military crisis was unleashed when Brazil's highest military authorities resigned in response to Jair Bolsonaro's attempts to politicize the Armed Forces. Since the beginning of his government, Bolsonaro has appointed several military personnel to civilian positions, seeking to receive support in return, including through public demonstrations in favor of his government's policies and against the measures adopted by the governors to deal with the COVID-19 pandemic, as well as defending the enactment of the State of emergency in order to increase his powers.

On March 29, after being dismissed by Bolsonaro, Fernando Azevedo e Silva, the Minister of Defense, declared that he had preserved the Armed Forces as "state institutions." The following day, commanders Edson Pujol (Army), Ilques Barbosa (Navy) and Antonio Carlos Moretti Bermudez (Air Force) resigned. The collective resignation of the commanders sought to demonstrate their opposition to any political interference by the military. However, the crisis has raised concerns about the politicization of the Armed Forces and the possibility of Bolsonaro planning a self-coup.

== See also ==
- Conservatism in Brazil
- New Right
- Politics of Brazil
- Ele Não movement
