= List of ministers of health of Brazil =

List of Brazilian health ministers

Minister of Health of Brazil
- Ministro da Saúde
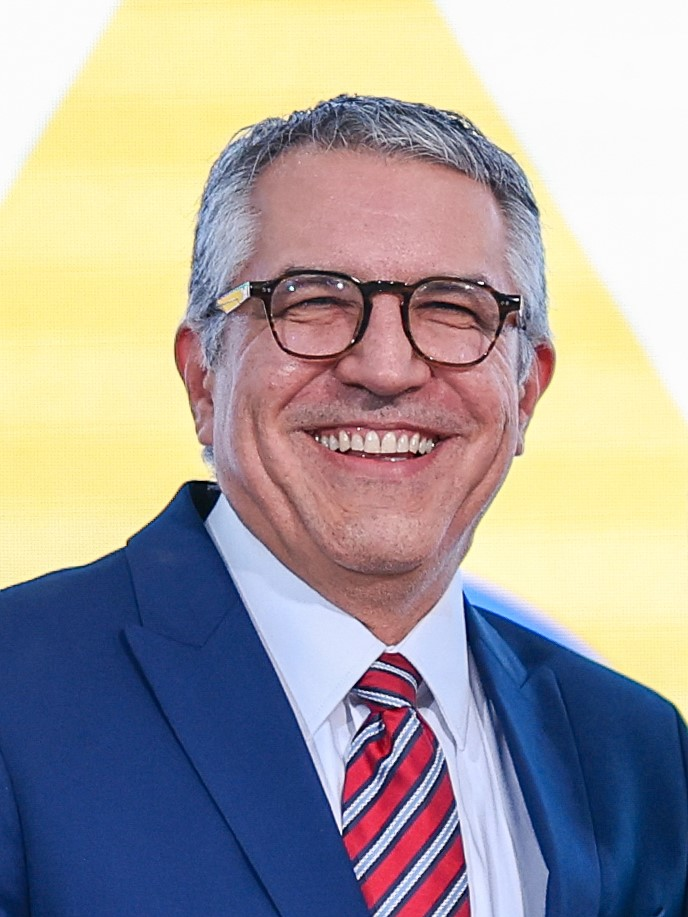
- Incumbent; Alexandre Padilha since 10 March 2025
- Style: Mr. Minister (informal); The Most Excellent Minister (formal); His Excellency (diplomatic)
- Type: Ministry
- Abbreviation: MS
- Member of: the Cabinet
- Reports to: the President
- Seat: Brasília, Federal District
- Appointer: President of Brazil
- Constituting instrument: Constitution of Brazil
- Formation: 6 August 1953; 73 years ago
- First holder: Antônio Balbino
- Salary: R$ 39,293.32 monthly
- Website: www.gov.br/saude/

This article lists the ministers of health of Brazil.

== List ==
No.	Portrait	Minister	Took office	Left office	Time in office	Party	President
1	Antônio Balbino	Antônio Balbino (1912–1992)	6 August 1953	22 December 1953	138 days	PSD	Getúlio Vargas (PTB)
2	Miguel Couto Filho	Miguel Couto Filho (1900–1969)	23 December 1953	2 June 1954	161 days	PSD	Getúlio Vargas (PTB)
3	Mario Pinotti	Mario Pinotti (1894–1972)	3 June 1954	4 September 1954	93 days	Independent	Getúlio Vargas (PTB); Café Filho (PSP)
4	Aramis Athayde	Aramis Athayde (1900–1971)	5 September 1954	20 November 1955	1 year, 76 days	Independent	Café Filho (PSP); Carlos Luz (PSD); Nereu Ramos (PSD)
5	Maurício de Medeiros	Maurício de Medeiros (1885–1966)	20 November 1955	2 July 1958	2 years, 224 days	Independent	Nereu Ramos (PSD); Juscelino Kubitschek (PSD)
6	Mario Pinotti	Mario Pinotti (1894–1972)	3 July 1958	31 July 1960	2 years, 28 days	Independent	Juscelino Kubitschek (PSD)
7	Pedro Paulo Penido	Pedro Paulo Penido (1904–1967)	1 August 1960	1 January 1961	153 days	Independent	Juscelino Kubitschek (PSD)
8	Armando Falcão	Armando Falcão (1919–2010)	1 January 1961	2 February 1961	32 days	PSD	Juscelino Kubitschek (PSD)
9	Edward Cattete	Edward Cattete (1912–1992)	3 February 1961	22 August 1961	200 days	Independent	Jânio Quadros (PTN)
10	Estácio Souto Maior	Estácio Souto Maior (1913–1974)	25 August 1961	7 September 1961	13 days	PTB	Ranieri Mazzilli (PSD)

No.	Portrait	Minister	Took office	Left office	Time in office	Party	Prime Minister
10	Estácio Souto Maior	Estácio Souto Maior (1913–1974)	7 September 1961	19 June 1962	285 days	PTB	Tancredo Neves (PSD)
11	Manuel Cordeiro Vilaça	Manuel Cordeiro Vilaça (1913–1971)	20 June 1962	30 August 1962	71 days	Independent	Tancredo Neves (PSD); Brochado da Rocha (PSD)
12	Eliseu Paglioli	Eliseu Paglioli (1898–1985)	18 September 1962	19 January 1963	123 days	Independent	Hermes Lima (PTB)

No.	Portrait	Minister	Took office	Left office	Time in office	Party	President
12	Eliseu Paglioli	Eliseu Paglioli (1898–1985)	19 January 1963	18 March 1963	58 days	Independent	João Goulart (PTB)
13	Paulo Pinheiro Chagas	Paulo Pinheiro Chagas (1906–1983)	19 March 1963	16 June 1963	89 days	Independent	João Goulart (PTB)
14	Wilson Fadul	Wilson Fadul (1920–2011)	17 June 1963	4 April 1964	292 days	PTB	João Goulart (PTB)
15	Vasco Leitão da Cunha	Vasco Leitão da Cunha (1903–1984)	4 April 1964	15 April 1964	11 days	Independent	Ranieri Mazzilli (PSD)
16	Raimundo de Moura Britto	Raimundo de Moura Britto (1909–1988)	15 April 1964	15 March 1967	2 years, 334 days	Independent	Castelo Branco (ARENA)
17	Leonel Tavares Miranda de Albuquerque	Leonel Tavares Miranda de Albuquerque (1903–1986)	15 March 1967	29 October 1969	2 years, 228 days	Independent	Costa e Silva (ARENA); Military Junta of 1969 (Military dictatorship in Brazil)
18	Francisco de Paula da Rocha Lagoa	Francisco de Paula da Rocha Lagoa (1919–2013)	30 October 1969	18 June 1972	2 years, 232 days	Independent	Emílio Garrastazu Médici (ARENA)
19	Mário Machado de Lemos	Mário Machado de Lemos (1922–2003)	19 June 1972	15 March 1974	1 year, 269 days	Independent	Emílio Garrastazu Médici (ARENA)
20	Paulo de Almeida Machado	Paulo de Almeida Machado (1916–1991)	15 March 1974	15 March 1979	5 years, 0 days	Independent	Ernesto Geisel (ARENA)
21	Mário Augusto Jorge de Castro Lima	Mário Augusto Jorge de Castro Lima (1925–2008)	15 March 1979	29 October 1979	228 days	Independent	João Figueiredo (ARENA)
22	Waldyr Arcoverde	Waldyr Arcoverde (1932–2017)	29 October 1979	15 March 1985	5 years, 137 days	Independent	João Figueiredo (PDS)
23	Carlos Corrêa de Menezes Sant'anna	Carlos Corrêa de Menezes Sant'anna (1931–2003)	15 March 1985	13 February 1986	335 days	MDB	José Sarney (MDB)
24	Roberto Santos	Roberto Santos (1926–2021)	13 February 1986	23 November 1987	1 year, 283 days	MDB	José Sarney (MDB)
25	Luiz Carlos Borges da Silveira	Luiz Carlos Borges da Silveira (born 1940)	23 November 1987	15 January 1989	1 year, 53 days	MDB	José Sarney (MDB)
26	Seigo Tsuzuki	Seigo Tsuzuki (born 1932)	15 January 1989	15 March 1990	1 year, 59 days	Independent	José Sarney (MDB)
27	Alceni Guerra	Alceni Guerra (born 1945)	15 March 1990	23 January 1992	1 year, 314 days	PFL	Fernando Collor (PRN)
28	José Goldemberg	José Goldemberg (born 1928)	23 January 1992	12 February 1992	20 days	Independent	Fernando Collor (PRN)
29	Adib Jatene	Adib Jatene (1929–2014)	12 February 1992	2 October 1992	233 days	Independent	Fernando Collor (PRN)
30	Jamil Haddad	Jamil Haddad (1926–2009)	8 October 1992	18 August 1993	314 days	PSB	Itamar Franco (MDB)
31	Saulo Moreira	Saulo Moreira (1922–2023)	19 August 1993	30 August 1993	11 days	MDB	Itamar Franco (MDB)
32	Henrique Santillo	Henrique Santillo (1937–2002)	30 August 1993	1 January 1995	1 year, 124 days	PP	Itamar Franco (MDB)
33	Adib Jatene	Adib Jatene (1929–2014)	1 January 1995	6 November 1996	1 year, 310 days	Independent	Fernando Henrique Cardoso (PSDB)
34	José Carlos Seixas	José Carlos Seixas (born 1937)	6 November 1996	13 December 1996	37 days	Independent	Fernando Henrique Cardoso (PSDB)
35	Carlos Albuquerque	Carlos Albuquerque (1940–2005)	13 December 1996	31 March 1998	1 year, 108 days	PSDB	Fernando Henrique Cardoso (PSDB)
36	José Serra	José Serra (born 1942)	31 March 1998	20 February 2002	3 years, 326 days	PSDB	Fernando Henrique Cardoso (PSDB)
37	Barjas Negri	Barjas Negri (born 1950)	20 February 2002	1 January 2003	315 days	PSDB	Fernando Henrique Cardoso (PSDB)
38	Humberto Costa	Humberto Costa (born 1957)	1 January 2003	8 July 2005	2 years, 188 days	PT	Luiz Inácio Lula da Silva (PT)
39	José Saraiva Felipe	José Saraiva Felipe (born 1952)	8 July 2005	31 March 2006	266 days	MDB	Luiz Inácio Lula da Silva (PT)
40	Agenor Álvares	Agenor Álvares (born 1947)	31 March 2006	16 March 2007	350 days	Independent	Luiz Inácio Lula da Silva (PT)
41	José Gomes Temporão	José Gomes Temporão (born 1951)	16 March 2007	1 January 2011	3 years, 291 days	MDB	Luiz Inácio Lula da Silva (PT)
42	Alexandre Padilha	Alexandre Padilha (born 1971)	1 January 2011	2 February 2014	3 years, 32 days	PT	Dilma Rousseff (PT)
43	Arthur Chioro	Arthur Chioro (born 1963)	2 February 2014	2 October 2015	1 year, 242 days	PT	Dilma Rousseff (PT)
44	Marcelo Castro	Marcelo Castro (born 1950)	2 October 2015	27 April 2016	208 days	MDB	Dilma Rousseff (PT)
45	Ricardo Barros	Ricardo Barros (born 1959)	12 May 2016	2 April 2018	1 year, 325 days	PP	Michel Temer (MDB)
46	Gilberto Occhi	Gilberto Occhi (born 1958)	2 April 2018	1 January 2019	274 days	PP	Michel Temer (MDB)
47	Luiz Henrique Mandetta	Luiz Henrique Mandetta (born 1964)	1 January 2019	16 April 2020	1 year, 106 days	DEM	Jair Bolsonaro (PSL)
48	Nelson Teich	Nelson Teich (born 1957)	17 April 2020	15 May 2020	28 days	Independent	Jair Bolsonaro (Ind)
49	Eduardo Pazuello	Eduardo Pazuello (born 1963)	15 May 2020	23 March 2021	312 days	Independent	Jair Bolsonaro (Ind)
50	Marcelo Queiroga	Marcelo Queiroga (born 1965)	23 March 2021	1 January 2023	1 year, 284 days	Independent	Jair Bolsonaro (PL)
51	Nísia Trindade	Nísia Trindade (born 1958)	1 January 2023	25 February 2025	2 years, 55 days	Independent	Luiz Inácio Lula da Silva (PT)
52	Alexandre Padilha	Alexandre Padilha (born 1971)	10 March 2025	Incumbent	1 year, 181 days	PT	Luiz Inácio Lula da Silva (PT)
