= COVID kit =

Cocktail of drugs ineffective in treating COVID-19

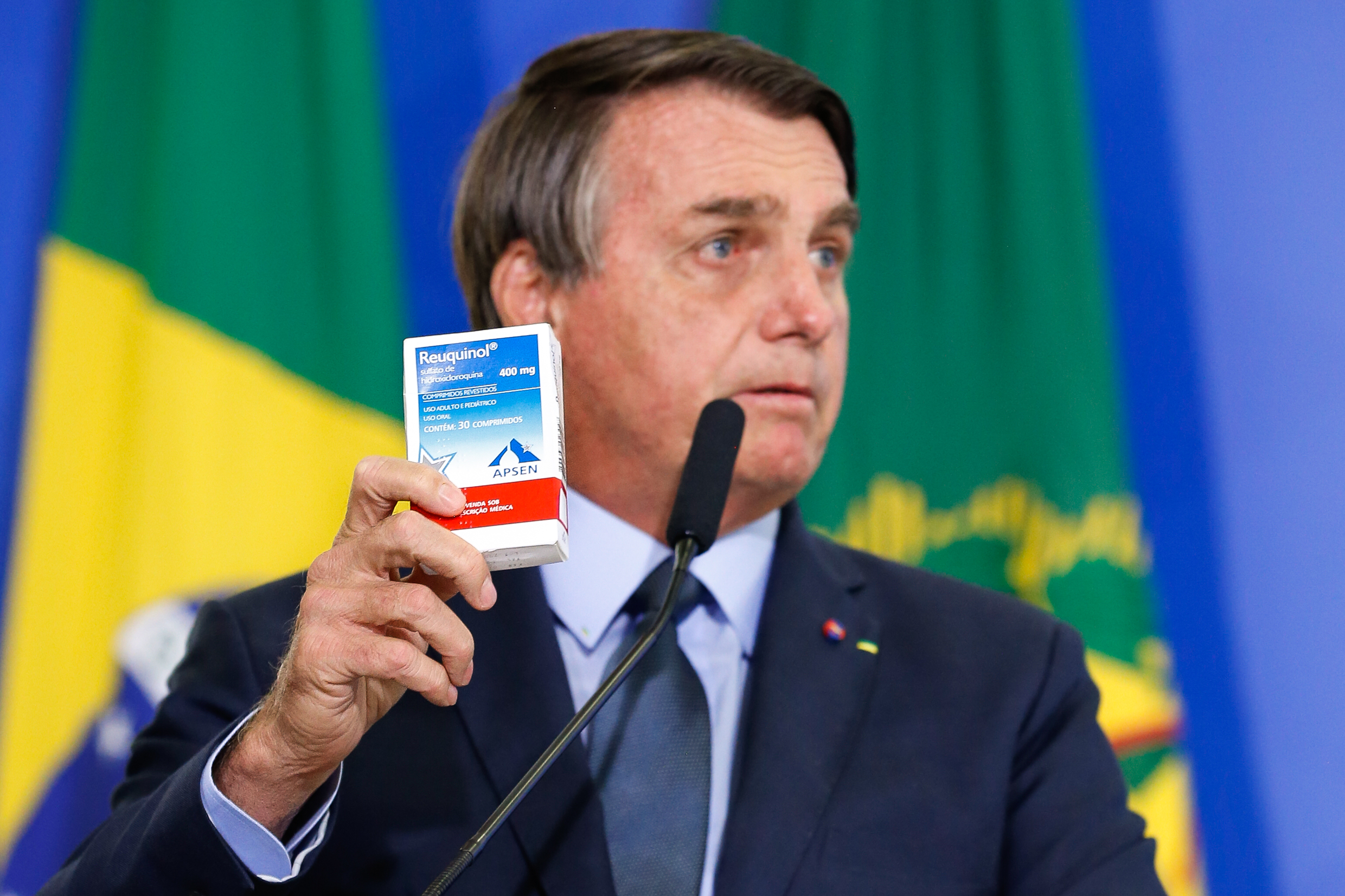
Jair Bolsonaro holding a box of chloroquine in September 2020

The COVID-19 kit, often referred to as early treatment, is a term used to describe the denialist approach promoted by the Brazilian government led by Jair Bolsonaro and his supporters regarding the use of medications with no proven efficacy in treating COVID-19. This approach includes advocating for the use of drugs such as chloroquine, hydroxychloroquine, ivermectin, azithromycin, bromhexine, nitazoxanide, anticoagulants, and zinc supplements.

At the start of the pandemic, specifically in March 2020, chloroquine emerged as a possible treatment for the disease based on two studies of questionable quality. Notably, Donald Trump, United States President at the time, endorsed one of these studies, challenging the recommendations of the Food and Drug Administration (FDA), which led to the politicization of the issue. In Brazil, President Jair Bolsonaro quickly adopted this stance. In the following months, the Brazilian government took steps to promote chloroquine and hydroxychloroquine as treatments for COVID-19. This included ordering production, coordinating distribution, and spending approximately 90 million reais on acquiring these drugs. Additionally, the Ministry of Health, under the leadership of Eduardo Pazuello, expanded the use of these substances to treat mild cases of the disease.

The COVID kit created a false sense of security among the population, suggesting that life could return to normal without the need for social distancing measures. However, this approach led to an increase in infections, hospitalizations, and deaths. Furthermore, the widespread use of these medications, along with their potential side effects, caused significant harm to the kidneys and livers of users. This approach was widely criticized by health organizations and experts due to the lack of scientific evidence and the potential dangers associated with its use. Nevertheless, it became the subject of lawsuits and investigations related to possible favoritism involving public and private agents seeking financial gains.

== Context ==
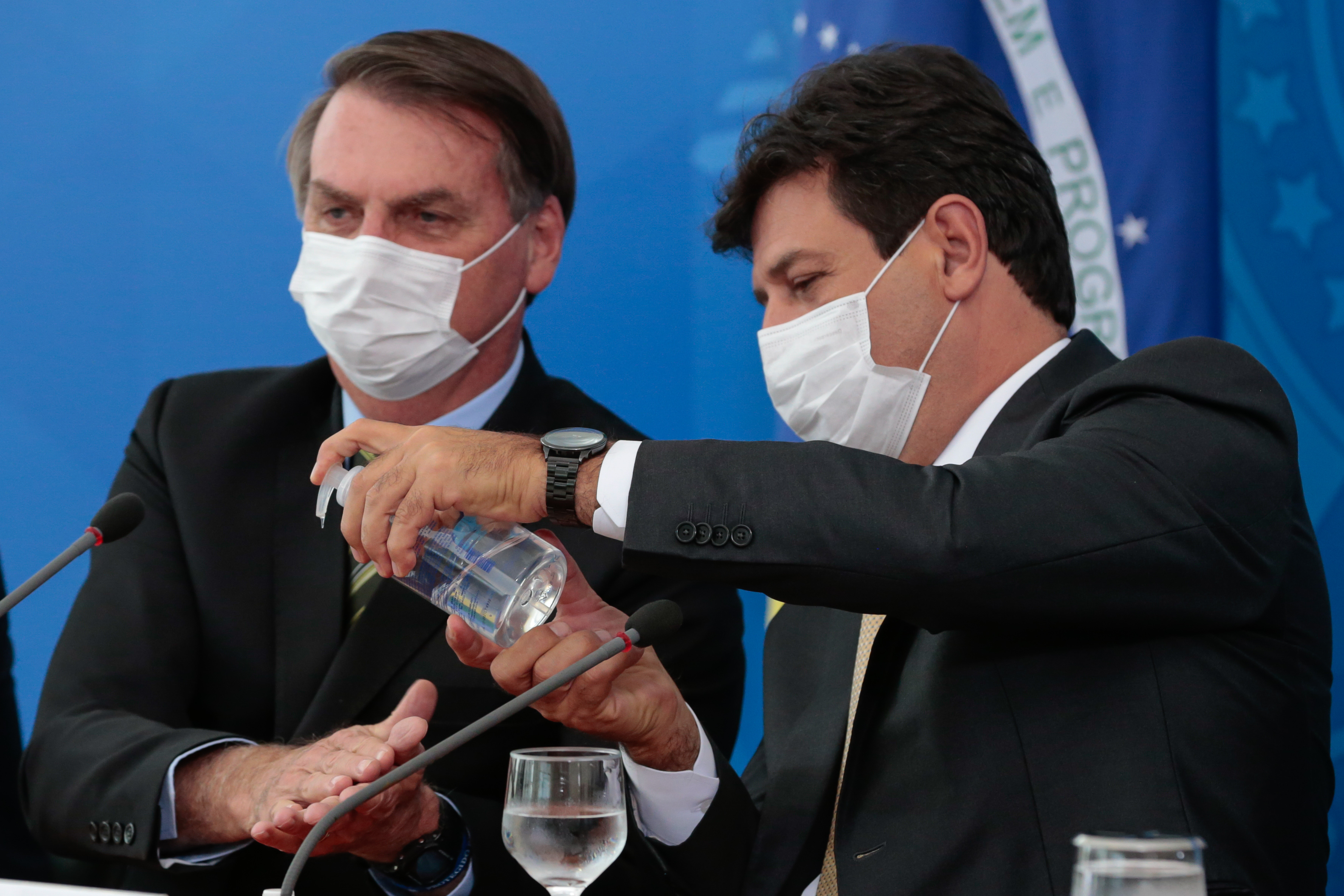
President Jair Bolsonaro and then-Health Minister Luiz Henrique Mandetta during a press conference in March 2020.

Having taken over the presidency in January 2019, Jair Bolsonaro consistently expressed interest in strengthening ties with then-President of the United States, Donald Trump. In the first half of 2020, as the COVID-19 pandemic intensified, Bolsonaro adopted rhetoric similar to Trump's, downplaying the severity of the disease's spread and advocating for the end of social isolation measures. Notably, Trump also supported the use of chloroquine based on a study published by the IHU-Méditerranée Infection Institute, a study that faced significant scrutiny from numerous scientists. Later, the institute's director, Didier Raoult, was accused by the French-Speaking Infectious Pathology Society (SPILF) of improperly promoting the drug. Shortly after Trump's endorsement, Bolsonaro also emphasized the efficacy of hydroxychloroquine, stating that "that drug, hydroxychloroquine, is working everywhere, right? I just got a French study sent to me now".

At the onset of the pandemic in Brazil, then-Health Minister Luiz Henrique Mandetta adopted the sanitary guidelines recommended by the World Health Organization (WHO). However, over time, increasing disagreements between Bolsonaro and the minister became evident. The then-president publicly advocated for the use of chloroquine and hydroxychloroquine while opposing social distancing measures. As a result of these divergences, Mandetta was fired, and oncologist Nelson Teich assumed the role of Health Minister, remaining in the position until May 15, 2020. His resignation stemmed from the government's push to expand the use of chloroquine in the treatment of COVID-19 patients and his perception that he lacked the necessary autonomy to lead the Ministry. Subsequently, Major General Eduardo Pazuello took over as interim Health Minister, being officially appointed four months later. During his tenure, the Ministry of Health promptly authorized the use of hydroxychloroquine for the treatment of patients with mild cases of COVID-19.

Throughout 2020, both Bolsonaro and Pazuello defended the use of drugs whose efficacy was under question. The federal government, in collaboration with the Brazilian Army and the Ministry of Foreign Affairs (Itamaraty), also coordinated the acquisition, production, and distribution of hydroxychloroquine. According to the Agência Pública, in March 2020 alone, the Brazilian Army produced and distributed 25,000 units of hydroxychloroquine. In total, over the course of that year, 3.2 million tablets of this drug were manufactured.

== Manaus healthcare collapse ==
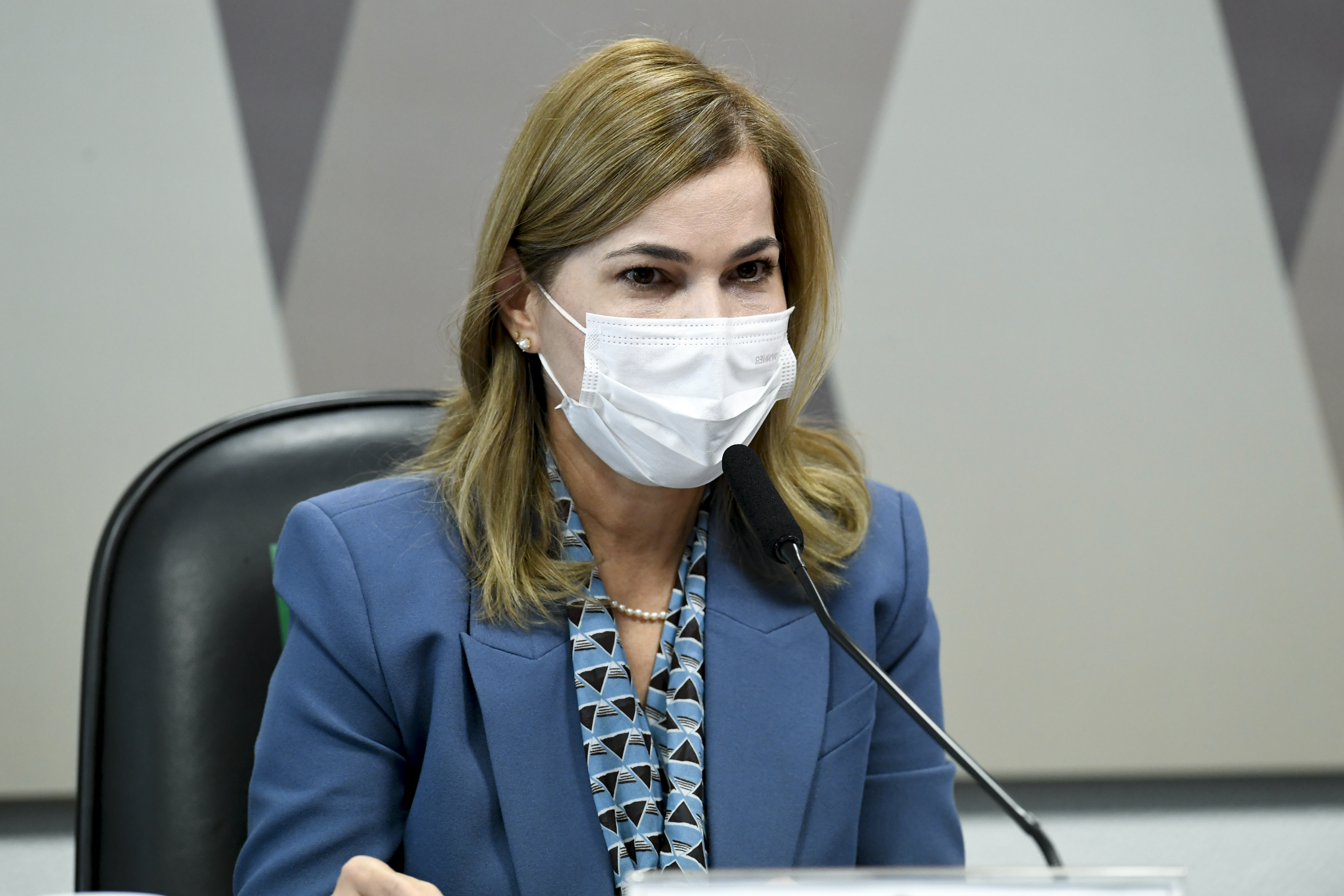
Mayra Pinheiro testifying before the COVID-19 Inquiry Committee in May 2021.

In January 2021, amid the worsening healthcare crisis in the state of Amazonas, the Ministry of Health pressured the Manaus city government to distribute the medications in the so-called COVID kit. A document signed by Mayra Pinheiro, Secretary of Labor Management and Health Education, was issued by the ministry, stating that the non-use of these medications would be considered "unacceptable". Additionally, the document requested authorization to visit Basic Health Units to promote early treatment in the city. Initially, the existence of this document was denied by Pazuello, but it was later acknowledged by Mayra Pinheiro herself.

During the same period, the Ministry of Health launched a mobile application called TrateCov on a trial basis, with the stated goal of assisting healthcare professionals, although it was accessible to anyone. The application sparked significant controversy by suggesting the prescription of various medications with unproven efficacy against COVID-19, including for newborns and animals. In response to criticism and the lack of scientific basis for its recommendations, the app was taken down the day after its launch.

On July 21, 2021, Jornal Nacional revealed the existence of documents obtained by the COVID-19 Parliamentary Inquiry Committee (COVID-19 CPI), which indicated the government's intent to persuade doctors and patients to use the medications in the COVID kit. According to the report, the Ministry of Health had funded a trip for 11 doctors to Manaus in January to train local healthcare professionals to prescribe medications with unproven efficacy against COVID-19. These doctors produced reports suggesting the establishment of "early treatment tents" to increase the availability of these medications and encourage self-medication with the COVID kit.

=== Parallel cabinet ===
Following the establishment of the COVID-19 Parliamentary Inquiry Committee (COVID-19 CPI) in April 2021, information about the federal government's handling of the pandemic began to emerge. In the first testimony, former Health Minister Luiz Henrique Mandetta revealed the existence of a "parallel advisory group", later known as the parallel cabinet. The purpose of this group was to advise the federal government to adopt a stance against vaccination, instead promoting early treatment and the pursuit of herd immunity. Mandetta also reported facing internal competition within the government, with advisors, the president's sons, and doctors proposing a decree to include COVID-19 treatment in the chloroquine leaflet, a claim later confirmed by the then-director-president of the Brazilian Health Regulatory Agency (Anvisa), Antonio Barra Torres. As the investigations progressed, names such as Federal Deputy Osmar Terra, former government advisor Arthur Weintraub, doctor Nise Yamaguchi, and businessman Carlos Wizard were mentioned by the committee as possible members of the parallel cabinet. Documents from the Chief of Staff's Office also revealed that individuals identified as potential members of this group participated in at least 24 meetings to discuss the government's pandemic response strategies.

On June 4, 2021, the news outlet Metrópoles released a video of a meeting in which Bolsonaro met with several healthcare professionals, including Osmar Terra, Nise Yamaguchi, and virologist Paolo Zanotto. During this meeting, Zanotto suggested the creation of a "shadow cabinet" to advise the government on the pandemic. In this meeting, the participants also presented the then-president with opinions opposing vaccines and supporting the use of hydroxychloroquine.

=== Political interference in Conitec ===
In July 2021, during Marcelo Queiroga's tenure, the Ministry of Health acknowledged the ineffectiveness of the COVID kit. This decision was based on an analysis conducted by the National Commission for the Incorporation of Technologies (Conitec), an advisory body of the Sistema Único de Saúde (SUS). However, despite this official stance, Bolsonaro and other government officials continued to advocate for early treatment.

On September 21, 2021, during the 76th United Nations General Assembly held in New York, Bolsonaro took the opportunity to defend early treatment. The following month, Conitec removed from its agenda the review of a study opposing the use of chloroquine in the treatment of COVID-19 patients. The Ministry of Health justified this decision, stating that the group of experts at Conitec chose to withdraw the document to refine the report. However, this sudden change surprised members of the body and raised suspicions of possible political interference.

=== Ministry of Health statement ===
On December 7, 2021, Conitec approved a report that did not recommend the use of chloroquine, azithromycin, ivermectin, and other medications with unproven efficacy for the treatment of COVID-19. After the approval of this report, it was forwarded to the Secretariat of Science, Technology, Innovation, and Strategic Health Inputs of the Ministry of Health. However, it was subsequently blocked by Secretary Hélio Angotti Neto. At the same time, the Ministry of Health issued a statement that erroneously classified hydroxychloroquine as effective and vaccination as ineffective in combating COVID-19. This statement triggered widespread backlash and was condemned by experts and scientific organizations. Five days after the statement's release, the Ministry removed the table containing false information but upheld its decision to reject Conitec's guidelines.

== The drugs ==
=== Chloroquine and Hydroxychloroquine ===
Structural formula of chloroquine.

Structural formula of hydroxychloroquine. Both drugs have no efficacy against COVID-19.

Chloroquine and hydroxychloroquine are medications used to treat and prevent malaria, as well as to manage conditions such as rheumatoid arthritis and lupus erythematosus. Both drugs are administered orally. Chloroquine commonly causes side effects such as muscle problems, loss of appetite, diarrhea, and skin rashes. More severe side effects include vision problems, muscle damage, seizures, and a reduction in blood cell counts. Hydroxychloroquine may cause common side effects such as vomiting, headaches, vision changes, and muscle weakness, as well as severe side effects including allergic reactions, vision problems, and cardiac arrhythmias.

Both drugs can increase the pH in cellular compartments called endosomes and inhibit the fusion of the SARS-CoV-2 virus with host cell membranes. Additionally, chloroquine inhibits the glycosylation of angiotensin-converting enzyme 2, which may interfere with the binding of the coronavirus to the cellular receptor. In vitro studies suggest that these drugs may block the transport of SARS-CoV-2 from early endosomes to endolysosomes, potentially preventing the release of the viral genome.

However, despite demonstrating antiviral activity in some in vitro systems, hydroxychloroquine did not reduce viral loads in the upper or lower respiratory tract and showed no clinical efficacy. Two randomized clinical trials conducted in Brazil and the United Kingdom showed that these drugs did not improve clinical outcomes in patients with mild to moderate cases compared to standard treatment. Furthermore, the use of hydroxychloroquine did not reduce the risk of death or the need for mechanical ventilation.

=== Ivermectin ===
Structural formula of ivermectin.

Ivermectin is a medication used to treat various infestations caused by parasites. These infestations include head lice, scabies, onchocerciasis, strongyloidiasis, trichuriasis, ascariasis, and lymphatic filariasis. For external infestations, ivermectin can be administered orally or applied to the skin. Its mechanism of action involves disrupting the nerve and muscle function of parasites, increasing the permeability of the parasite's cell membrane, leading to paralysis and death. In mammals, including humans, ivermectin's structure prevents it from crossing the blood-brain barrier, thus protecting the central nervous system. The most common side effects of ivermectin include red eyes, dry skin, and a burning sensation.

In in vitro studies, ivermectin demonstrated antiviral effects against several positive-sense single-stranded RNA viruses, including SARS-CoV-2. Subsequent preliminary research also showed that ivermectin could inhibit viral replication in monkey kidney cell cultures and generic cells. However, achieving the plasma concentrations required for the observed antiviral efficacy would require administering doses up to 100 times higher than those approved for use in humans.

The results of various randomized clinical trials and retrospective studies on the use of ivermectin in treating COVID-19 patients have not led to a definitive conclusion. Some clinical studies showed no significant benefits and, in some cases, observed a worsening of the disease after ivermectin use, while others indicated outcomes such as a shorter duration of symptoms, reduced inflammatory conditions, faster viral clearance, and lower mortality rates.

=== Azithromycin ===
Structural formula of azithromycin.

Azithromycin is an antibiotic widely used to treat bacterial infections. Its most common indications include the treatment of otitis media, streptococcal pharyngitis, pneumonia, traveler's diarrhea, and various intestinal infections. Additionally, azithromycin can be used to treat sexually transmitted infections such as chlamydia and gonorrhea, and, when combined with other medications, it can be employed in the treatment of malaria. Azithromycin can be administered orally or intravenously. The most common side effects associated with this antibiotic include nausea, vomiting, diarrhea, and stomach discomfort. Less frequently, allergic reactions such as anaphylaxis, prolonged QT syndrome, or a type of diarrhea associated with the bacteria Clostridioides difficile may occur.

The antibiotic was studied in combination with other medications as a potential alternative for combating the COVID-19 virus. Preliminary in vitro tests indicated some effectiveness against the virus; however, the available evidence was limited and of low quality. Subsequent controlled clinical trials did not confirm the presumed efficacy, and one study revealed that its use may lead to deterioration of kidney function in some patients.

== Distribution and legal actions ==
Medications such as chloroquine were widely distributed and supported by the federal government. The Brazilian Army, under the guidance of the Ministry of Health, produced over 3.2 million chloroquine tablets in 2020 and distributed 2.9 million of these tablets to states, municipalities, and military hospitals. This distribution represented a significant increase compared to previous years, reaching up to 11 times higher. In February 2021, Benjamin Zymler, a minister of the Federal Court of Accounts (TCU), authorized a document demanding explanations regarding the distribution of chloroquine by these federal agencies.

Brazilian territory saw instances of pressure and coercion to promote the adoption of the COVID kit. A survey by the Frente Nacional de Prefeitas e Prefeitos revealed that municipal administrators faced pressure from city councils to acquire these medications, and bills were even passed to this effect. Additionally, some companies distributed the COVID kit to their employees. On the legal front, the Federal Court ordered the cessation of government campaigns promoting the use of the COVID kit. Judge Ana Lúcia Petri Betto ruled that the Secretariat of Social Communication must refrain from "sponsoring advertising actions, by any means, that contain direct or indirect references to medications with unproven efficacy against COVID-19, especially using expressions such as 'early treatment' or 'COVID kit' or similar terms". Meanwhile, the Rio Grande do Sul State Court of Justice prohibited the distribution of these drugs in Porto Alegre.

=== Prevent Senior case ===
In the private healthcare sector, Prevent Senior widely distributed the COVID kit, including through mail delivery. However, the company became embroiled in one of the largest medical scandals following allegations of unethical and unscientific conduct. According to a dossier, Prevent Senior allegedly forced doctors to prescribe medications with unproven efficacy against COVID-19 and concealed deaths in a study on chloroquine that was publicized and praised by then-President Bolsonaro. The study in question, conducted by Prevent Senior in 2020 with inconclusive results, claimed that the use of hydroxychloroquine and azithromycin reduced hospitalizations in patients suspected of having COVID-19. However, the study faced negative criticism due to sampling errors and various methodological flaws. In April 2020, the National Health Council (CNS) issued a statement deeming the Prevent Senior study as scientific fraud. Despite the criticism and lack of solid scientific evidence, the study's data were used by then-President Jair Bolsonaro to promote the supposed efficacy of the COVID kit.

The dossier, anonymously compiled by doctors and former doctors of Prevent Senior, brought to light serious allegations against the company. According to the dossier, the company hid deaths related to the study and administered COVID kit medications without the consent of patients or their families. A GloboNews report gained access to a spreadsheet containing the names and details of all study participants. In total, nine participants died during the study, but only two deaths were reported by the study's authors. Following the GloboNews report, newspapers such as O Estado de S. Paulo and O Globo published information indicating that the federal government, through the so-called parallel cabinet, was aware of the events at Prevent Senior. As a result, the company became the target of investigations by the COVID-19 Parliamentary Inquiry Committee (CPI da COVID-19), the National Supplementary Health Agency (ANS), the São Paulo Public Prosecutor's Office, and the São Paulo Regional Medical Council (Cremesp).

On November 29, 2021, the company issued a statement acknowledging that the promotion of the COVID kit's efficacy did not correspond to actual scientific research and admitted that the disclosed data were obtained internally for statistical purposes, without any scientific rigor. Furthermore, the company admitted that it did not obtain authorization from the National Research Ethics Council to conduct any scientific studies.

=== Hapvida case ===
In October 2021, Hapvida, one of Brazil's largest private healthcare plan companies, was accused of pressuring doctors to meet prescription targets for the COVID kit. According to a report by the newspaper O Globo, the company instructed its employees to significantly increase chloroquine prescriptions and to convince patients that it was the best treatment, despite the proven inefficacy of the substance against COVID-19. Doctors who refused to follow these guidelines were placed on a list that involved punishments, such as warnings and changes to their work schedules.

During the same period, Globo journalist Malu Gaspar published a report by Johanns Eller on her blog, stating that doctors at Hapvida who felt coerced received a document defending chloroquine, attributed to doctor Nise Yamaguchi. This document, consisting of 33 slides, used questionable arguments and widely contested studies by the scientific community to advocate for early treatment with chloroquine.

== Impacts ==
=== On health ===
The widespread use and side effects associated with these drugs caused significant harm to organs, particularly the kidneys and liver, and were linked to cardiac arrhythmias. In Brazilian hospitals, cases of drug-induced hepatitis began to be identified, which led to an increase in the waiting list for liver transplants. Additionally, the country started recording deaths related to the use of chloroquine and hydroxychloroquine, with some patients being treated with these drugs without the knowledge or consent of their families.

According to experts, the COVID kit had an indirect harmful effect by creating a false sense of security among the population, leading to the relaxation of effective preventive measures. This could also result in delays in seeking appropriate medical care. Furthermore, the widespread use of antibiotics, such as azithromycin, may contribute to increased antimicrobial resistance.

=== Fake news ===
The COVID kit was also the target of false information spread by profiles and government supporters on social media. These pieces of misinformation aimed to contradict the proven inefficacy of the COVID kit medications, often promoting misleading and scientifically unsupported claims. Brazil was the country that recorded the most false information about chloroquine in 2020.

For this reason, several organizations and media outlets, such as the portals Aos Fatos and G1, the University of São Paulo's newspaper, the Institute of Science, Technology, and Quality, and even the Oswaldo Cruz Foundation, published clarifications and evidence-based information to combat misinformation.

=== Financial ===
The Bolsonaro government indeed coordinated the purchase, distribution, and promotion of the COVID kit in Brazil. Reported expenditures on acquiring these medications amounted to approximately 90 million reais, while distribution through popular pharmacies and advertising expenses reached 250 million and 23 million reais, respectively. An amount of 1.3 million reais was used to fund digital influencers.

The commercialization of these medications indicated for early treatment saw a substantial increase, boosting the pharmaceutical sector in Brazil. The National Health Surveillance Agency (Anvisa) reported a 628% growth in ivermectin sales in 2020 compared to the previous year. In 2019, this medication recorded sales of approximately 7,000 packages; however, due to the spread of misinformation during the pandemic, this number rose to 56,000 packages. A study conducted by the Pharmaceutical Products Industry Union (Sindusfarma), based on data provided by the American consultancy IQVIA, highlighted a significant increase in ivermectin sales, which grew by 829% in 2020, rising from 44.4 million reais in 2019 to 409 million reais in 2020. During the same period, chloroquine sales increased by 47%, resulting in revenue growth from 55 million to 91.6 million reais. Additionally, pharmaceutical companies observed a considerable increase in their revenue due to chloroquine sales.

The financial impact of the COVID kit raised suspicions of favoritism among both public and private agents, allegedly aimed at generating financial profits during the pandemic. A notable example is the company Vitamedic, one of the manufacturers of ivermectin in the country, which funded a manifesto promoted by the Doctors for Life association in defense of early treatment.

== Repercussions ==
=== Positions of entities and experts ===
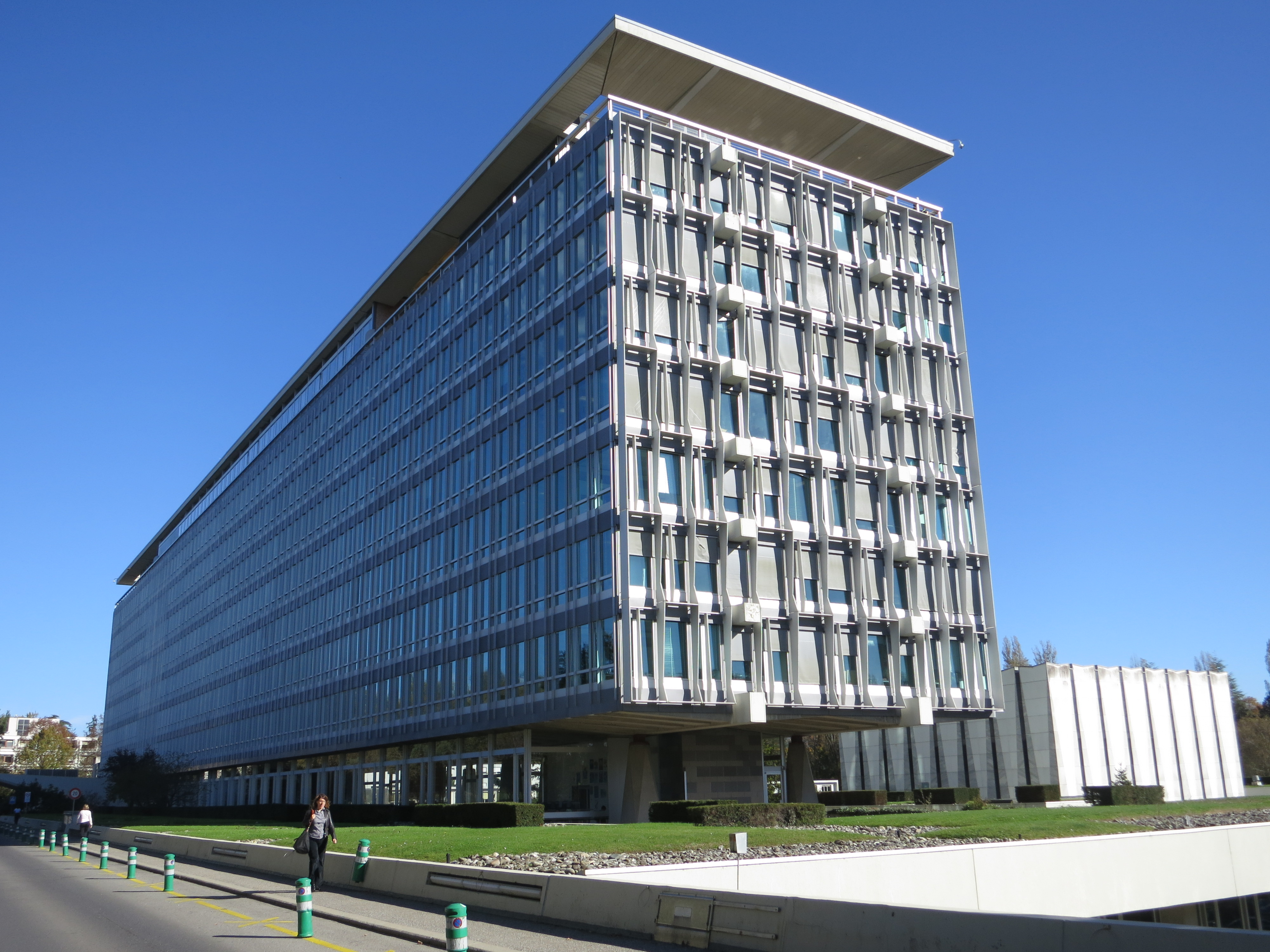
WHO HQ in Geneva, Switzerland.

Major health agencies strongly disapproved or advised against the use of the drugs included in the COVID kit. A significant milestone in this context was the Solidarity Therapeutics Trial, a platform coordinated by the WHO, which concluded that hydroxychloroquine was ineffective in treating COVID-19. This conclusion came from one of the largest randomized clinical trials in the world. On March 2, 2021, the WHO issued a guideline strongly recommending against the use of hydroxychloroquine as a preventive treatment for COVID-19. The agency also recommended that ivermectin not be used in the treatment of patients with the disease, except in clinical trials. The review of data from sixteen randomized clinical trials, as mentioned by the WHO, did not allow for a conclusion on the drug's efficacy due to methodological limitations. These drugs were also discouraged by other major health entities, including the European Medicines Agency, the FDA, and Anvisa. In February 2021, Merck Sharp and Dohme, the pharmaceutical company that developed ivermectin, issued an official statement reinforcing that there is no scientific evidence of the drug's efficacy in treating COVID-19 based on preclinical tests.

In Brazil, 81 medical entities issued a document advocating for the ban on the use of COVID kit medications. This statement was part of a bulletin from the Extraordinary COVID-19 Monitoring Committee, a group led by the Brazilian Medical Association (AMB). In contrast, the Federal Council of Medicine authorized the prescription of these medications in 2020. This discrepancy between the Brazilian Medical Association and the Federal Council of Medicine was highlighted by the newspaper O Estado de São Paulo as an example of the influence of the political polarization promoted by Bolsonaro on the country's medical entities.

"For chloroquine and hydroxychloroquine, we have more than 30 gold-standard studies showing that these drugs are not effective for COVID-19. For ivermectin, we also have studies demonstrating its ineffectiveness, as well as a series of poorly conducted and highly inconclusive studies." - Pasternak

Addressing the issue, microbiologist Natalia Pasternak emphasized that various types of scientific studies have been conducted to validate the use of the COVID kit or early treatment. However, according to her, the best studies in this area show that several components of the kit have been disproven, meaning they lack proven efficacy in treating COVID-19. Scientist and doctor Drauzio Varella considered the prescription of these drugs "irresponsible". He also argued that the discussion about early treatment was used as a strategy to divert public attention and criticize the spread of the virus, stating that then-President Bolsonaro suggested the use of these drugs as an alternative to social distancing and other preventive measures.

Scientist and doctor Miguel Nicolelis criticized Bolsonaro for his approach toward opponents of early treatment, stating that while the rest of the world uses science to combat the pandemic, in Brazil, scientists are being labeled as "scoundrels". He expressed concern about this rhetoric and emphasized that it is the scientists labeled as scoundrels who will play a crucial role in overcoming the pandemic crisis in the country. Nicolelis also made a striking comparison between the number of Brazilian COVID-19 victims and the number of victims in the Battle of Stalingrad.

=== In politics ===
The COVID kit was widely perceived as an attempt by President Bolsonaro to downplay the severity of the pandemic and generate polarization on the issue. This strategy succeeded in sparking heated debates within the political class, which had impacts on states and municipalities, making it more difficult to adopt effective public policies to combat the pandemic. Bolsonaro continued to encourage the use of these drugs and even insulted those who opposed them.

In the political sphere, opposition leaders criticized Bolsonaro's rhetoric and called for investigations. In the Senate, then-opposition leader Randolfe Rodrigues, along with Senators Renan Calheiros and Humberto Costa, walked out of a COVID-19 Inquiry Committee session in protest against invited infectious disease specialists who supported early treatment. On the other hand, the congressional base supporting the government at the time defended the COVID kit. Some senators, such as Luis Carlos Heinze and Jorginho Mello, cited the municipalities of Rancho Queimado and Chapecó as positive examples of early treatment. However, the lethality and hospitalization rates in these municipalities remained within normal standards.

== See also ==
- 2021 Brazil health crisis
- COVID-19 pandemic in Brazil
- COVID-19 misinformation
- COVID-19 pandemic in the United States
