= Timeline of the COVID-19 pandemic in Brazil =

The following is a timeline of the COVID-19 pandemic in Brazil.

== November 2019 ==
- 27 November: Two raw sewage samples collected independently on 27 November 2019 in Santa Catarina, Brazil, will later detect SARS-CoV-2 (100,000 copies per litre), 66 days in advance of the first COVID-19 confirmed case in the Americas. Subsequent samplings are positive on 11 December 2019 and 20 February 2020. These samples can show that SARS-CoV-2 was circulating in Brazil at least as early as late November 2019.

== February 2020 ==
- 26 February: The Ministry of Health confirms the first case of COVID-19 in Brazil and subsequently South America, a 61-year-old man from São Paulo who returned from Italy.

== March 2020 ==
- 5 March: The first cases of internal transmission of the novel coronavirus is recorded in Brazil.
- 12 March: The first death caused by COVID-19 in Brazil is recorded by the Ministry of Health. The victim is a 57-year-old woman in São Paulo. The first previously known death in Brazil was a man on 16 March.
- 20 March: Brazil's Federal Senate unanimously approves a presidential decree declaring a national emergency due to the coronavirus pandemic, allowing the federal government to waive fiscal targets and free up budget resources to fight the virus.
- 24 March: Amazonas confirms the first death caused by COVID-19.
- 25 March: Pernambuco and Rio Grande do Sul confirm their first death caused by COVID-19.

== April 2020 ==
- 9 April: In a televised statement, President Jair Bolsonaro defends the use of chloroquine and hydroxychloroquine to fight COVID-19.
- 10 April: Brazil reaches 1,000 deaths from COVID-19, according to the Ministry of Health.
- 16 April: President Jair Bolsonaro fires his health minister Luiz Henrique Mandetta after a series of disagreements over federal government efforts to contain COVID-19.
- 28 April: Brazil reaches 5,000 deaths from COVID-19, according to the Ministry of Health.

== May 2020 ==
- 8 May: Brazil surpasses 10,000 deaths from COVID-19 and becomes the sixth country with the most deaths from the disease, according to a survey from state health secretariats.
- 12 May: Brazil overtakes Germany and becomes the country with the seventh-highest number of COVID-19 cases, according to the Johns Hopkins University.
- 15 May: President Jair Bolsonaro fires his health minister Nelson Teich after a series of disagreements over federal government efforts to contain COVID-19.
- 18 May: Brazil overtakes United Kingdom and becomes the country with the third-highest number of COVID-19 cases, according to the Johns Hopkins University.
- 19 May: Brazil reaches more than 1,000 deaths in a single day for first time, according to the Ministry of Health.
- 21 May: Brazil reaches 20,000 deaths from COVID-19, according to the Ministry of Health.
- 22 May: Brazil overtakes Russia and becomes the country with the second-highest number of COVID-19 cases, according to the Johns Hopkins University.

== June 2020 ==
- 2 June: Brazil reaches 30,000 deaths from COVID-19, according to a data from the Ministry of Health.
- 6 June: The Ministry of Health removes months of data on COVID-19 from the government website.
- 8 June: Brazil's Federal Supreme Court orders the Ministry of Health to resume the disclosure of the accumulated data from the official website.
- 9 June: The Ministry of Health releases the accumulated numbers and proportional rates of contagions and deaths due to COVID-19 from the government website again.
- 11 June: Brazil reaches 40,000 deaths from COVID-19, according to a data from the state health secretariats.
- 19 June: Brazil reaches 1 million COVID-19 cases, according to a data from the state health secretariats.
- 20 June: Brazil reaches 50,000 deaths from COVID-19, according to a data from the state health secretariats.
- 25 June: Brazil becomes the country with the most recovered from COVID-19 in the world, according to a data from the Johns Hopkins University.

== July 2020 ==
- 1 July: Brazil reaches 60,000 deaths from COVID-19, according to a data from the state health secretariats.
- 4 July: Brazil reaches 1 million people recovered from COVID-19, according to a data from the state health secretariats.
- 7 July: President Jair Bolsonaro says in an interview broadcast by TV Brasil that he tested positive for COVID-19.
- 10 July: Brazil reaches 70,000 deaths from COVID-19, according to a data from the state health secretariats.
- 16 July: Brazil reaches 2 million cases of COVID-19, according to the Ministry of Health.
- 20 July: Brazil reaches 80,000 deaths from COVID-19, according to a data from the state health secretariats.
- 29 July: The state of São Paulo reaches 500,000 COVID-19 cases. With 1,554 deaths, Brazil records the highest number of deaths from COVID-19 in 24 hours.
- 29 July: Brazil reaches 90,000 deaths from COVID-19, according to a data from the state health secretariats.
- 30 July: First Lady Michelle Bolsonaro tests positive for COVID-19.

== August 2020 ==
- 3 August: Chief of Staff in the Brazilian Presidency Walter Souza Braga Netto tests positive for COVID-19, becoming the seventh cabinet minister to contract the disease.
- 4 August: Secretary-General of the Brazilian Presidency Jorge de Oliveira Francisco tests positive for COVID-19, becoming the eighth cabinet minister to contract the disease.
- 5 August: Brazil reaches 2 million people recovered from COVID-19, according to the Ministry of Health.
- 8 August: Brazil reaches 3 million cases and 100,000 deaths from COVID-19, according to a data from the state health secretariats.
- 12 August: The state of Paraná signs an agreement with Russia to produce and distribute Sputnik V vaccine against COVID-19.
- 25 August: Senator Flávio Bolsonaro, the eldest son of president Jair Bolsonaro, tests positive for COVID-19.
- 29 August: Brazil reaches 3 million people recovered from COVID-19, according to the Ministry of Health.

== September 2020 ==
- 2 September: Brazil surpasses 4 million cases of COVID-19, according to a data from the state health secretariats.
- 7 September: Brazil is surpassed by India and becomes the country with the third-highest number of COVID-19 cases, according to the Johns Hopkins University.
- 16 September: General Eduardo Pazuello becomes Brazil's third health minister during the coronavirus pandemic, after nearly four months holding the position on an interim basis.
- 24 September: Brazil reaches 4 million people recovered from COVID-19, according to the Minister of Health.

== October 2020 ==
- 3 October: The state of São Paulo reaches one million cases of COVID-19, according to the state government.
- 7 October: Brazil surpasses 5 million cases of COVID-19, according to a data from the state health secretariats.
- 10 October: Brazil reaches 150,000 deaths from COVID-19, according to a data from the state health secretariats.

== November 2020 ==
- 1 November: The State of São Paulo reaches 1 million people recovered from COVID-19, according to the state government.
- 1 November: Brazil reaches 5 million people recovered from COVID-19, according to the Johns Hopkins University.
- 9 November: The Brazilian Health Regulatory Agency determines the interruption of the clinical trial of the CoronaVac vaccine after the registration of a "serious adverse event".
- 11 November: The Brazilian Health Regulatory Agency authorizes Sinovac to resume its vaccine trials less than 48 hours after halting the tests, which are being conducted by the Butantan Institute in the state of São Paulo.
- 20 November: Brazil surpasses 6 million cases of COVID-19, according to a data from the state health secretariats.
- 26 November: President Jair Bolsonaro says he will not take a coronavirus vaccine.

== December 2020 ==
- 10 December: The Ministry of Health confirms the first reinfection case of COVID-19 in Brazil.
- 13 December: Cedro do Abaeté registers two cases confirmed from COVID-19, becoming the last city in Brazil to register the cases of disease.
- 16 December: The government of São Paulo state confirms the first reinfection case of COVID-19 in same state since the beginning of the pandemic.
- 22 December: Minas Gerais reaches the mark of 500,000 cases and becomes the second state with the most infected by COVID-19 in Brazil, according to the bulletin released by the state government.
- 23 December: The Ministry of Health recommends a 10-day isolation for people arriving from the United Kingdom with symptoms of COVID-19 due to a new variant of the disease detected in the European country. The federal government temporarily suspends flights from the United Kingdom due to a new variant of the COVID-19.
- 27 December: Brazil's vice president, Hamilton Mourão, tests positive for COVID-19.
- 31 December: The diagnostic laboratory in São Paulo detects two first cases of the new variant of COVID-19 from United Kingdom.

== January 2021 ==
- 4 January: The government of São Paulo confirms two cases of people infected by the new variant of COVID-19, identified in the United Kingdom.
- 5 January: Santa Catarina reaches the mark of 500,000 cases and becomes the third state with the most infected by COVID-19 in Brazil, according to the bulletin released by the state government.
- 6 January: President Jair Bolsonaro says that the federal government has suspended the purchase of syringes because of high prices asked by manufacturers.
- 6 January: Bahia reaches the mark of 500,000 cases and becomes the fourth state with the most infected by COVID-19 in Brazil, according to the bulletin released by the state government.
- 7 January: Brazil reaches 200,000 deaths from COVID-19, according to a data from the state health secretariats.
- 8 January: Brazil surpasses 8 million cases of COVID-19, according to a data from the state health secretariats.
- 12 January: A Brazilian variant of coronavirus is found in the state of Amazonas.
- 14 January: The hospital system in Manaus, the capital of the state of Amazonas, is collapsing from the second wave of COVID-19 and it is running out of oxygen.
- 17 January: The Brazilian Health Regulatory Agency unanimously authorizes the emergency use of CoronaVac and Oxford vaccines. The state of São Paulo starts the vaccination against COVID-19 for health professionals at the University of São Paulo Faculty of Medicine Clinics Hospital. Mônica Calazans, a 54-year-old black nurse in São Paulo and part of the risk group, becomes the first person to be vaccinated in Brazil, receiving the Chinese vaccine CoronaVac. 112 health professionals are vaccinated on the first day. Vanuzia Costa Santos, a nursing technician living in the city of Guarulhos, becomes the first indigenous person in Brazil to be vaccinated against COVID-19.
- 18 January: The states of Rio de Janeiro, Santa Catarina, Goiás, Piauí, Mato Grosso do Sul, Maranhão, Espírito Santo, Tocantins, Minas Gerais, Ceará, Pernambuco, Mato Grosso, Paraná, Amazonas and Rio Grande do Sul start the vaccination for health professionals, the elderly and the indigenous people.
- 19 January: The states of Acre, Alagoas, Amapá, Bahia, Pará, Paraíba, Sergipe, Rio Grande do Norte, Rondônia and Roraima and the Federal District start the vaccination with the majority being health professionals. The state of São Paulo reaches 50,000 deaths from COVID-19.
- 23 January: Protest caravans are held in several cities of 23 states and the Federal District to demand the ouster of President Jair Bolsonaro over his handling of the COVID-19 pandemic.
- 27 January: Brazil surpasses 9 million cases of COVID-19, according to a data from the state health secretariats.
- 30 January: Brazil reaches 2 million people vaccinated in all 26 states and the Federal District, according to a data from the state health secretariats.

== February 2021 ==
- 4 February: Brazil reaches 3 million people vaccinated in all 26 states and the Federal District, according to a data from the state health secretariats.
- 4 February: Rio de Janeiro becomes the Brazilian city with the highest number of COVID-19 deaths, surpassing São Paulo.
- 6 February: Pfizer Inc applies for full regulatory approval for its COVID-19 vaccine in Brazil.
- 8 February: An other Brazilian variant of coronavirus different in Goiás, now called P2, is found by the Adolfo Lutz Institute, in the city of São Paulo, after analyzing a sample of a resident of Ceres, in the state of Goiás. The São Paulo laboratory confirms a case of reinfection in the same person.
- 9 February: The State of São Paulo reaches 1 million vaccinated against COVID-19, according to a data from the State Government of same name.
- 13 February: The City of São Paulo confirms the first case of the Brazilian variant of coronavirus, detected in Manaus. A patient who lives in São Paulo and was not in the capital of Amazonas.
- 13 February: The State of Goiás confirms two cases of the UK variant in two cities of Luziânia and Valparaíso, both in the state of same name after sequencing test samples taken on December 31, 2020. Brazil reaches 5 million people vaccinated in all 26 states and the Federal District, according to a data from the state health secretariats.
- 13 February: Cities begin to suspend the vaccination campaign against COVID-19 due to lack of doses. Campo Grande becomes the first Brazilian capital of state to suspend.
- 16 February: Salvador and Cuiabá suspend the first dose of COVID-19 vaccines due to lack of doses on same day.
- 17 February: The city of Rio de Janeiro suspends the first dose of COVID-19 vaccines due to lack of doses.
- 17 February: The last Juma male member, Aruká Juma, dies from complications caused by COVID-19 in Porto Velho. He was survived by his three daughters, the only remaining members of the tribe.
- 18 February: Brazil surpasses 10 million cases of COVID-19, according to a data from the state health secretariats.
- 19 February: Curitiba suspends the first dose of COVID-19 vaccines due to lack of doses.
- 26 February: Sergipe confirms the first case of the Brazilian variant of the novel coronavirus, originally identified in Amazonas.
- 24 February: Brazil reaches 250,000 deaths from COVID-19, according to a data from the state health secretariats. The State of São Paulo reaches 2 million of COVID-19 cases.
- 26 February: Maranhão confirms the first case of the Brazilian variant of the novel coronavirus, originally identified in Amazonas.

== March 2021 ==
- 2 March: The State of São Paulo reaches 60,000 deaths from COVID-19 and records the most number of deaths in 24 hours with 468 new deaths, according to a data from the state government.
- 6 March: Rio Branco suspends the first dose of COVID-19 vaccines due to lack of doses.
- 7 March: Brazil surpasses 11 million cases of COVID-19, according to a data from the state health secretariats.
- 10 March: Brazil reaches 270,000 deaths from COVID-19, according to a data from the state health secretariats.
- 12 March: Brazil becomes the second country in the world with more cases of COVID-19 again, surpassing India, according to a data from Johns Hopkins University.
- 15 March: President Jair Bolsonaro chooses doctor Marcelo Queiroga to replace Eduardo Pazuello as fourth Minister of Health.
- 18 March: Senator Major Olímpio becomes the third Brazilian senator to die of COVID-19, after Arolde de Oliveira and José Maranhão.
- 22 March: Brazil surpasses 12 million cases of COVID-19, according to a data from the state health secretariats.
- 23 March: Brazil registers the highest number of the daily deaths from COVID-19 with 3,251 new deaths in 24 hours, according to a data from the state health secretariats.
- 24 March: Brazil reaches 300,000 deaths from COVID-19, according to a data from the state health secretariats.
- 24 March: President Jair Bolsonaro announces the creation of a committee that will be meeting weekly to fight against the COVID-19 pandemic.
- 30 March: In a new record, Brazil reports 3,668 deaths from COVID-19 in 24 hours, according to a data from the state health secretariats.

== April 2021 ==
- 1 April: Brazil administers more than 1 million doses of the COVID-19 vaccines in a day for the first time, according to a data from the state health secretariats.
- 5 April: Brazil surpasses 13 million cases of COVID-19, according to a data from the state health secretariats.
- 7 April: Brazil reaches 10% of people vaccinated against COVID-19 with the first dose 79 days after the start of the vaccination campaign in the states, according to a data from the state health secretariats gathered by the consortium of press vehicles.
- 12 April: Brazil is surpassed by India again, becoming the third country in the world with more cases of COVID-19, according to a data from Johns Hopkins University.
- 18 April: A 42-year-old pregnant woman becomes the first person to die after being diagnosed with the Delta variant in Brazil.
- 20 April: Brazil surpasses 14 million cases of COVID-19, according to a data from the state health secretariats.
- 21 April: A study at the Feevale University, in Novo Hamburgo, in the state of Rio Grande do Sul, confirms the first death caused by COVID-19 reinfection with two variants from different states in Brazil.
- 27 April: Brazil's Senate opens its inquiry into President Jair Bolsonaro's handling of the COVID-19 pandemic.
- 29 April: Brazil reaches 400,000 deaths from COVID-19, according to a data from the state health secretariats.

== May 2021 ==
- 6 May: Brazil surpasses 15 million cases of COVID-19, according to a data from the state health secretariats.
- 8 May: The state of São Paulo reaches 100,000 deaths from COVID-19, according to a data from the Statewise System for Data Analysis Foundation (SEADE).
- 9 May: The state of São Paulo reaches three million cases of COVID-19, according to the state government.
- 20 May: The state health secretariat in Maranhão records the first cases of the Indian variant of COVID-19 in Brazil.
- 22 May: Brazil surpasses 16 million cases of COVID-19, according to a data from the state health secretariats.
- 24 May: Brazil reaches 450,000 deaths from COVID-19, according to a data from the state health secretariats.
- 25 May: A new variant of COVID-19, now called P.4, is identified in Itirapina, in the interior of São Paulo, according to researcher at the São Paulo State University in Botucatu and vice president of the Brazilian Society for Virology, João Pessoa Araújo Júnior.

== June 2021 ==
- 8 June: Brazil surpasses 17 million cases of COVID-19, according to a data from the state health secretariats.
- 19 June: Brazil reaches 500,000 deaths from COVID-19, according to a data from the state health secretariats.
- 22 June: Brazil surpasses 18 million cases of COVID-19, according to a data from the state health secretariats.
- 22 June: A new variant of COVID-19, now called as P.5, is detected in city of Porto Real, in Rio de Janeiro state.
- 23 June: The city of São Paulo suspends the vaccination against COVID-19 due to lack of doses.

== July 2021 ==
- 1 July: Brazil surpasses the mark of 100 million doses of vaccines applied against COVID-19, according to data from the state health secretariats.
- 2 July: Brazil's Supreme Court Justice Rosa Weber authorizes the opening of an investigation into President Jair Bolsonaro for alleged malfeasance in the case of the purchase of the Indian-made Covaxin vaccine.
- 9 July: Brazil surpasses 19 million cases of COVID-19, according to a data from the state health secretariats.

== August 2021 ==
- 4 August: Brazil surpasses 20 million cases of COVID-19, according to a data from the state health secretariats.

== September 2021 ==
- 13 September: Brazil surpasses 21 million cases of COVID-19, according to a data from the state health secretariats.

== October 2021 ==
- 8 October: Brazil reaches 600,000 deaths from COVID-19, according to a data from the state health secretariats and the Ministry of Health.

== November 2021 ==
- 19 November: Brazil surpasses 22 million cases of COVID-19, according to a data from the state health secretariats.

== January 2022 ==
- 16 January: Brazil surpasses 23 million cases of COVID-19, according to a data from the state health secretariats.

== May 2023 ==
- 5 May: The World Health Organization declares the end of the pandemic.
