= Ethel Maciel =

Brazilian epidemiologist and PhD

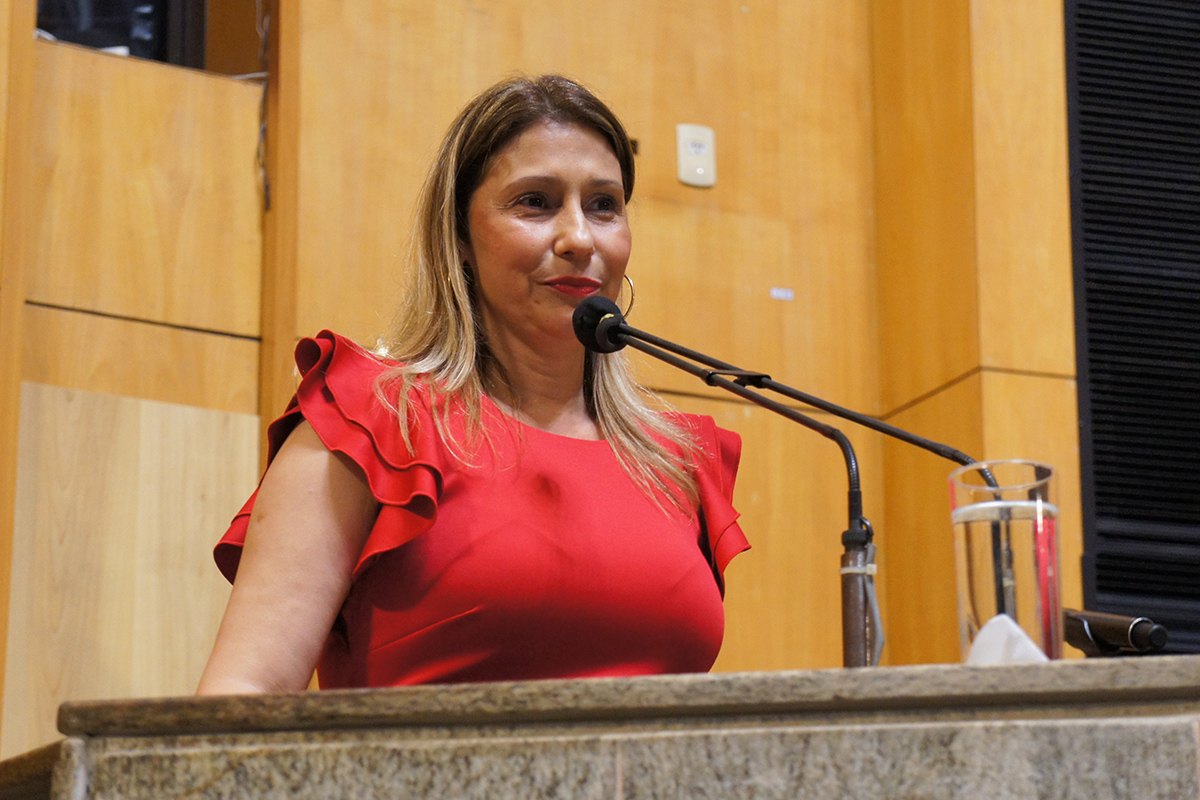
- Ethel Maciel in 2018

Former Secretária de Vigiância em Saúde e Ambiente
- In office 1 January 2023 – 10 March 2025
- Minister: Nísia Trindade

Ministry of Health (Brazil)
- President: Luiz Inácio Lula da Silva

Personal details
- Born: Ethel Leonor Noia Maciel; 17 November 1968 (age 57) Baixo Guandu, Espírito Santo
- Education: Universidade Federal do Espírito Santo

Ethel Leonor Noia Maciel (born 17 November 1968; Baixo Guandu) is a Brazilian PhD, epidemiologist, nurse, Professor and the Chairperson for the Tuberculosis Research Network from World Health Organization. She is a researcher in infectious diseases with a special focus on tuberculosis. From 2023 to 2025 she was Secretary of Health Surveillance and Environment, an internal secretary of Brazil's Ministry of Health.

== Education ==
She holds a degree in nursing from the Federal University of Espírito Santo (Ufes), a master's degree in Public Health Nursing from the Federal University of Rio de Janeiro (UFRJ), a doctorate in Public Health/Epidemiology from the State University of Rio de Janeiro (UERJ), and completed her postdoctoral studies at the Bloomberg School of Public Health at Johns Hopkins University.

== Career ==
She is a full professor in the nursing department at the Federal University of Espírito Santo and holds a productivity scholarship from CNPq in the field of epidemiology. She chaired the Brazilian Tuberculosis Network (Rede – TB). She was a member of the Tuberculosis Advisory Technical Group at the Ministry of Health and the Tuberculosis Advisory Technical Group of the Pan American Health Organization, an entity linked to the WHO.

Between 2013 and 2020, she served as the vice-rector of the Federal University of Espírito Santo (Ufes). In 2019, she was democratically elected as the rector of the same university, following a consultation with the university community and the Ufes' superior council. She was the first woman to be elected to the position. Despite winning the election, Maciel was not appointed by the then-president Jair Bolsonaro.

Since 2020, Maciel has gained prominence in the press as a leading Brazilian researcher involved in scientific dissemination during the COVID-19 pandemic. In October 2023 she assumed the chair of the Tuberculosis Research Network from the World Health Organization, a United Nations organization. In February 2024, she hosted the Stop TB Partnership in Brazil, alongside WHO's director Tedros Adhanom. They launched the Brasil Saudável Program (Healthy Brazil, in Portuguese), a program aimed at eliminating more than 30 diseases from the country.

She was President of the Brazilian Tuberculosis Research Network and currently coordinates the area of international and institutional relations of REDE-TB, representing Brazil in the BRICS Tuberculosis Research Network.

== Research ==
Maciel has more than 230 published articles and research conducted in collaboration with public health organizations, both in Brazil and the United States of America, among other countries, and articles published in important scientific journals indexed in national and international databases. The central theme of her research, as can be observed, is the control of infectious diseases, particularly tuberculosis.

== Recognition ==
Since 2020, Maciel has gained prominence in the media as one of the leading Brazilian researchers involved in scientific dissemination during the COVID-19 pandemic.

In 2023, the WHO recognized the work of Maciel and Minister Nísia Trindade in the multisectoral leadership for the fight against tuberculosis in Brazil. Also in that year, she was invited by the United Nations to the 2nd High-Level Meeting on Tuberculosis, where she could reaffirm the necessary prioritization of investments in health throughout the country to fund treatments, vaccines, and diagnostics for the population. As an expert in the field, Maciel is part of the permanent commission of the Parliamentary Front against Tuberculosis in the National Congress.

She was featured in the media for preventing the disposal of R$ 251 million worth of poorly preserved vaccines and other supplies.

In November 2023, she announced the inclusion of coronavirus vaccines for children up to 5 years old in the country's vaccination schedule.

In 2025, she was invited by the organization of COP 30, which takes place in Belém, Brazil, as one of the special envoys of the event. The invitation was a way to present the demand of Global Health and One Health, Ethel's research topic.

== Bibliography ==
=== Books and publications ===
- Mulher na ciência: lutar e existir em tempos de pandemia. [Woman in Science: Fighting and Existing in Times of Pandemic]. Vitória: Encontrografia, 2022. 274 p. ISBN 9786588977897.

=== Articles ===
- "Genotypic and Spatial Analysis of Mycobacterium tuberculosis Transmission in a High-Incidence Urban Setting". The Lancet. 1 September 2015.
- "Treatment correlates of successful outcomes in pulmonary multidrug-resistant tuberculosis: an individual patient data meta-analysis". The Lancet. 8 September 2018.
- "Effect of the Bolsa Familia Programme on the outcome of tuberculosis treatment: a prospective cohort study". The Lancet. 21 December 2018.
- "Risk factors associated with cluster size of Mycobacterium tuberculosis (Mtb) of different RFLP lineages in Brazil". The Lancet. 8 February 2019.
- "Tuberculosis in Brazil and cash transfer programs: A longitudinal database study of the effect of cash transfer on cure rates." The Lancet. 22 February 2019.
- "Introducing risk inequality metrics in tuberculosis policy development". The Lancet, 6 June 2019.
- "Factors associated with latent tuberculosis among international migrants in Brazil: a cross-sectional study (2020)". The Lancet. 1 June 2021.
- "Spatial clustering and temporal trend analysis of international migrants diagnosed with tuberculosis in Brazil". The Lancet. 9 June 2021.
- "Living conditions, seroprevalence and symptoms of COVID-19 in slums in the Metropolitan Region of Vitória (Espírito Santo)". The Lancet. 29 October 2021.
- "Excess tuberculosis cases and deaths following an economic recession in Brazil: an analysis of nationally representative disease registry data". The Lancet. 10 October 2022.
- "A Matter of Inclusion: A Cluster-Randomized Trial to Access the Effect of Food Vouchers Versus Traditional Treatment on Tuberculosis Outcomes in Brazil". The Lancet. 14 November 2022.
- "Factors associated with non-completion of TB preventive treatment in Brazil". The Lancet. 1 March 2023.
