= Marcelle Soares-Santos =

Brazilian physicist

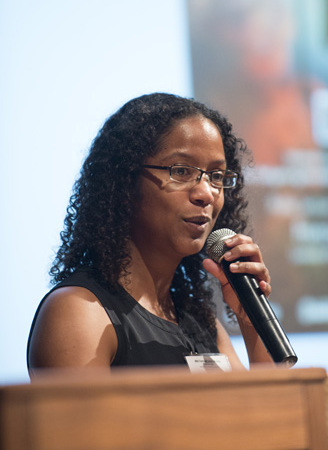
- Marcelle at the opening of the 48th annual Fermilab Users Meeting
- Born: 24 September 1983 (age 42); Vitória, Espírito Santo
- Education: Federal University of Espírito Santo; University of São Paulo
- Occupation: Physicist
- Years active: 2004-
- Employer: University of Zurich
- Known for: Sloan Research Fellowship

Marcelle Soares-Santos is a Brazilian physicist and a full professor at the University of Zürich. Previously she worked as an associate professor of Physics and Experimental Cosmology and Astrophysics formerly at the University of Michigan and Brandeis University and before that at permanent scientists at Fermilab.

== Biography ==
Marcelle was born in Vitória, Brazil, in 1983. Two years later, her family moved to Parauapebas, in the Carajás Mountains, in the State of Pará. She graduated in Physics at the Federal University of Espírito Santo (Ufes) in 2004. She then pursued a Master's degree and Doctorate in Astronomy at the University of São Paulo (USP), defending her Doctorate dissertation in 2010.

In 2010 Soares-Santos became a Research Associate in Astrophysics at the Fermi National Accelerator Laboratory, in Batavia, near Chicago. Her research at Fermilab was focused on the characteristics of gravitational waves and in dark energy. There, Soares-Santos contributed to the construction of the Dark Energy Camera, one of the largest telescope cameras in the world, which she employed to search for gravitational wave-emitting collisions of neutron stars and black holes. Work at Fermilab continued until 2017, when she became assistant professor of Physics in Brandeis University.

In 2020 she became assistant professor in the University of Michigan at Ann Arbor. In 2024 Soares-Santos moved to the University of Zürich.

== Recognition ==
In 2014, she was bestowed the Alvin Tollestrup Award for her postdoctoral research.

In 2019, the Alfred P. Sloan Foundation awarded Marcelle Soares-Santos a Sloan Research Fellowship, one of the most competitive and prestigious awards available to early-career researchers.

She was named a Fellow of the American Physical Society in 2023, "for organizing and leading a team that co-discovered the optical kilonova counterpart to the first binary neutron star gravitational wave event from LIGO-Virgo".
