= Ricardo Barros (politician) =

Brazilian politician, civil engineer and businessman

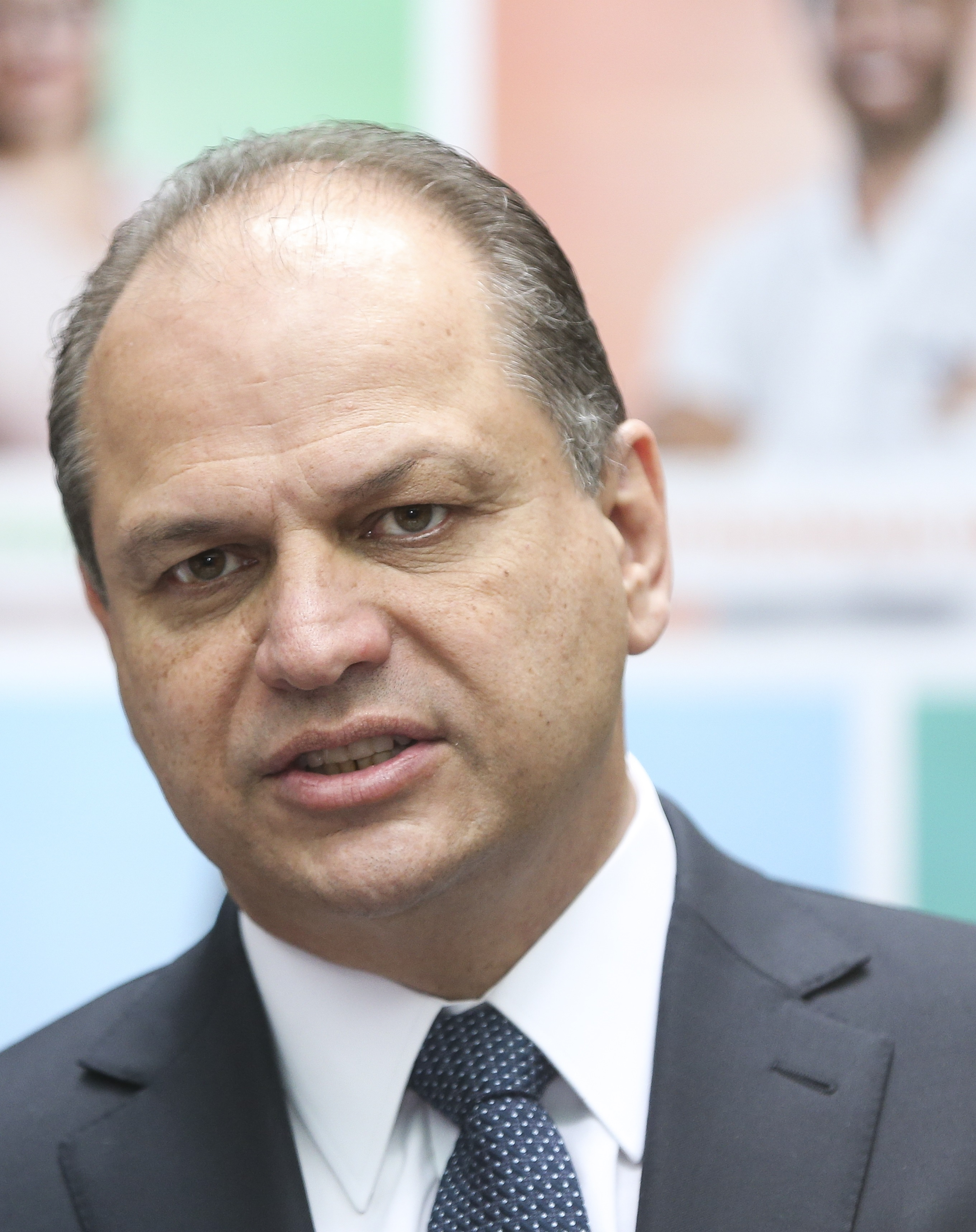

Member of the Chamber of Deputies
- Incumbent
- Assumed office 1 February 2015
- Constituency: Paraná
- In office 1 February 1995 – 1 February 2011
- Constituency: Paraná

First Gentleman of Paraná
- In office 6 April 2018 – 1 January 2019
- Governor: Cida Borghetti
- Preceded by: Fernanda Bernardi
- Succeeded by: Luciana Saito

Minister of Health
- In office 12 May 2016 – 6 April 2018
- President: Michel Temer
- Preceded by: Agenor Álvares
- Succeeded by: Gilberto Occhi

Mayor of Maringá
- In office 1 January 1989 – 1 January 1993
- Preceded by: Said Ferreira
- Succeeded by: Said Ferreira

Personal details
- Born: Ricardo José Magalhães Barros; 15 November 1959 (age 66) Maringá, Paraná, Brazil
- Party: PP (1997–present)
- Other political affiliations: PFL (1988–1997)
- Spouse: Cida Borghetti
- Parents: Sílvio Magalhães Barros (father); Bárbara Cecily Netto Barros (mother)
- Education: State University of Maringá
- Occupation: Civil engineer

Ricardo José Magalhães Barros (born 15 November 1959) is a Brazilian politician, civil engineer and businessman. He is a federal deputy and former mayor of Maringá. He is married to the Vice Governor of Paraná, Cida Borghetti. He is the son of the former mayor of Maringá Silvio Magalhães Barros and brother to the mayor Silvio Barros. In 2010, Barros was candidate for the Federal Senate, getting more than 2 million votes.

He is national vice-president of the Progressive Party (PP) and president of the National Council of Secretaries of Economic Development. In 2012, he was national coordinator of the city elections of PP, winning in his electoral domicile. He graduated as an Engineer at the State University of Maringá.

He was appointed on 12 May 2016 as Minister of Health by president Michel Temer, after the suspension of president Dilma Rousseff due to her impeachment process.

Gilberto Occhi, then president of Caixa Econômica Federal, succeed him as Minister, since Barros resigned to run for federal deputy at the 2018 general elections.

Political offices
Preceded by Said Ferreira	Mayor of Maringá; 1989–1993	Succeeded by Said Ferreira
Preceded by Agenor Álvares	Minister of Health; 2016–2018	Succeeded by Gilberto Occhi
Honorary titles
Preceded by Fernanda Bernardi	First Gentleman of Paraná; 2018–2019	Succeeded by Luciana Saito
