= Brazilian Nonproprietary Name =

The Brazilian Nonproprietary Name or DCB, from the Portuguese Denominação Comum Brasileira is the official Portuguese nomenclature for drugs or active ingredients that have been approved by the Brazilian Health Regulatory Agency (ANVISA) for use in Brazil. The consolidated list from October 2021 contains just over 12,300 items.

Every record has a numerical identifier known as the DCB Number, used in contexts such as registrations, tenders and official documentation.

== History ==
In 1970 Andrejus Korolkovas, from the Faculty of Pharmaceutical Sciences, University of São Paulo, was already publishing about the importance of a nomenclature to harmonize the names of drugs. In the year 1981, a list of generic names that would be mandatory for a new registration of a medicine was published in the Official Gazette of the Union, by the Ministry of Health. A standardization of nomenclature was carried out, and the introduction of numerical codes that would allow the identification of the substances. In 1983 the use of the standard nomenclature in official documents was made mandatory.

== See also ==
- International Nonproprietary Name
- British Approved Name
- United States Adopted Name
- Interactive Terminology for Europe
- IUPAC nomenclature
