= Gilberto Occhi =

Brazilian lawyer and politician

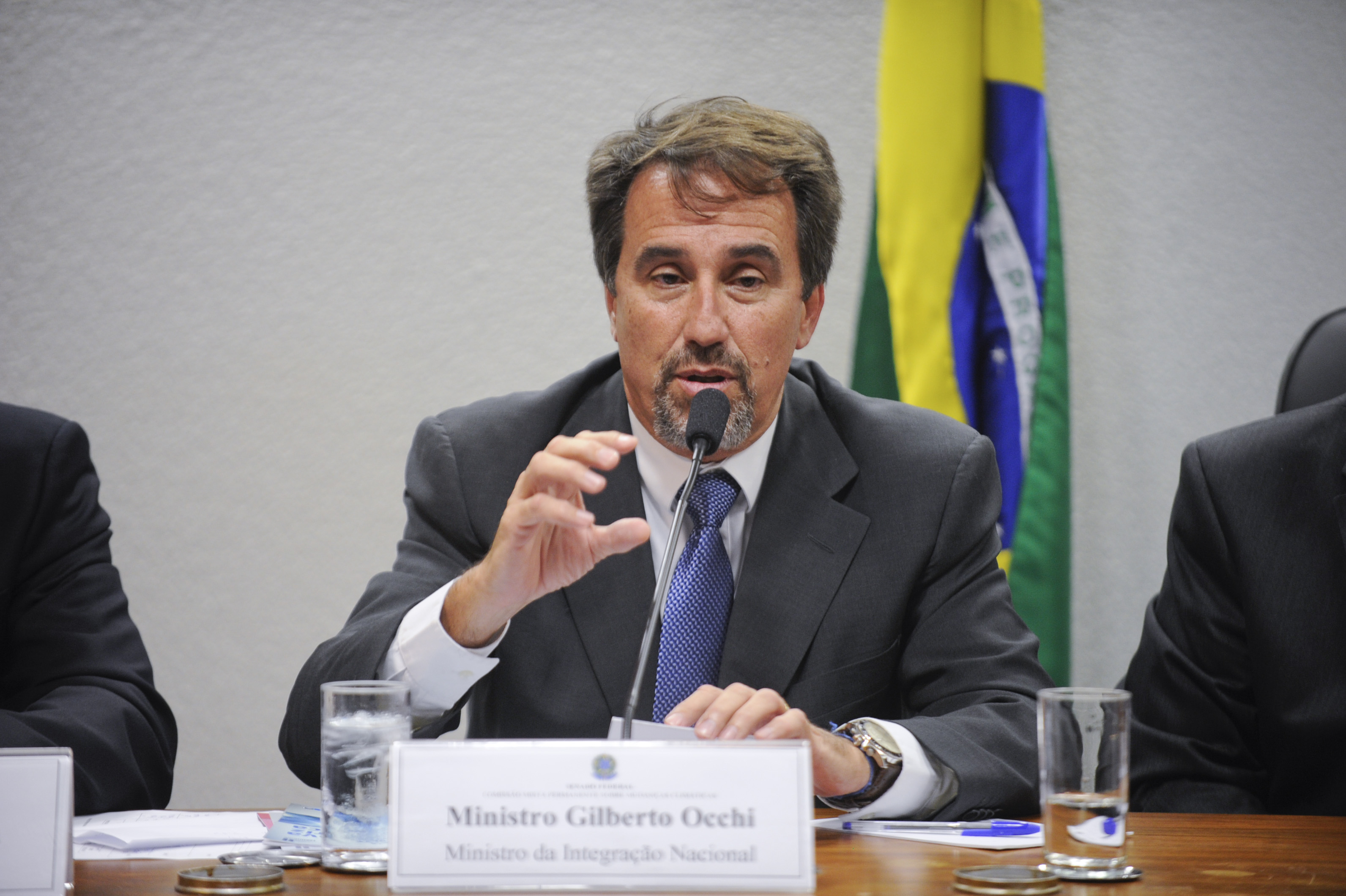
- Minister Gilberto Occhi in 2015

Minister of Health
- In office 2 April 2018 – 1 January 2019
- President: Michel Temer
- Preceded by: Ricardo Barros
- Succeeded by: Luiz Henrique Mandetta

President of the Caixa Econômica Federal
- In office 1 June 2016 – 2 April 2018
- Minister: Henrique Meirelles
- Preceded by: Miriam Belchior
- Succeeded by: Nelson Antônio de Souza

Minister of National Integration
- In office 1 January 2015 – 13 April 2016
- President: Dilma Rousseff
- Preceded by: Francisco Teixeira
- Succeeded by: Josélio de Andrade Moura (Acting)

Ministry of Cities
- In office 17 March 2014 – 1 January 2015
- President: Dilma Rousseff
- Preceded by: Aguinaldo Ribeiro
- Succeeded by: Gilberto Kassab

Personal details
- Born: Gilberto Magalhães Occhi; 24 July 1958 (age 66); Ubá, MG, Brazil
- Political party: PP
- Profession: Lawyer

Gilberto Magalhães Occhi (born 24 July 1958) is a Brazilian lawyer and politician member of the Progressistas (PP). He was Minister of Cities and of National Integration during the government of president Dilma Rousseff.

On 1 June 2016, then acting president Michel Temer nominated Occhi president of the Brazilian public bank Caixa Econômica Federal. Occhi left the presidency of the bank after he was nominated Minister of Health by president Temer, to substitute Ricardo Barros, who was running for reelection as federal deputy.

== Biography ==
On 29 December 2014, he was confirmed as new Minister of National Integration of the second cabinet of Dilma Rousseff. On 13 April 2016, he resigned after his party, the Progressive Party, decided to support the impeachment of Dilma Rousseff.

In October 2017, the Minister of Finance Henrique Meirelles and Occhi discussed about Caixa's statute reform. The reunion had as main theme the approval of a new statute of the bank. The changes want to turn the bank administration more transparent and adapt the financial institution to the rules provided in the State Companies Law.

Yet in October 2017, Occhi was cited in the plea of the financial operator Lúcio Funaro to the Prosecutor-General of the Republic (PGR). In his testimony, Funaro defended that Gilberto Occhi had, at the time he was vice-president of Government of the financial institution, a "monthly goal" of bribes to "produce" and distribute to politicians of the Progressive Party. By his press advisor, Occhi informed that "[he] strongly deny" what was said by Lúcio Funaro about his person.

Government offices
Preceded by Miriam Belchior	President of Caixa Econômica Federal; 2016–18	Succeeded by Nelson Antônio de Souza
Political offices
Preceded by Aguinaldo Ribeiro	Minister of Cities; 2014–15	Succeeded by Gilberto Kassab
Preceded by Francisco Teixeira	Minister of National Integration; 2015–16	Succeeded by Josélio de Andrade Moura; Acting
Preceded by Ricardo Barros	Minister of Health; 2018–19	Succeeded by Luiz Henrique Mandetta
