= Nísia Trindade =

Brazilian political scientist and sociologist

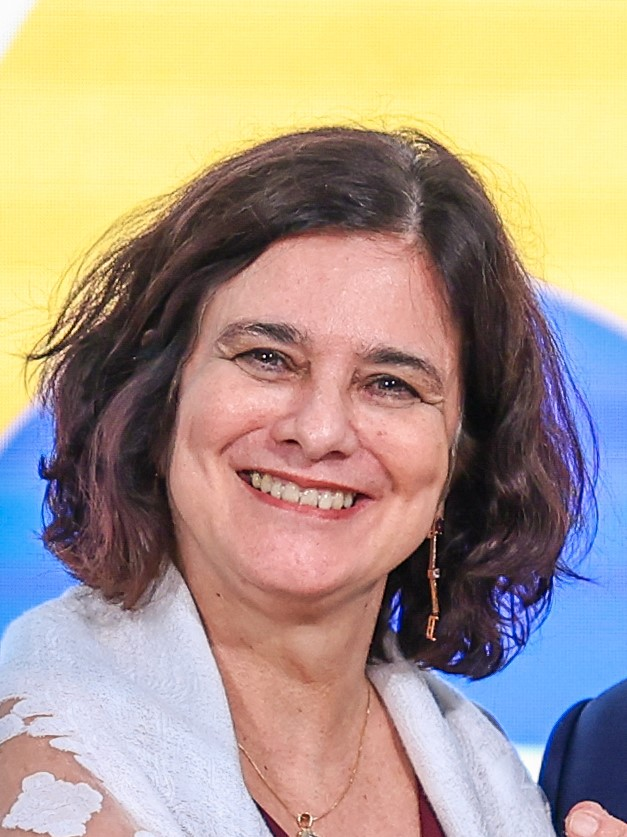
- Trindade in 2023

Member-elect of the Chamber of Deputies
- Assuming office 1 February 2027
- Constituency: Rio de Janeiro

Minister of Health
- In office 1 January 2023 – 25 February 2025
- President: Luiz Inácio Lula da Silva
- Preceded by: Marcelo Queiroga
- Succeeded by: Alexandre Padilha

Chairwoman of Oswaldo Cruz Foundation
- In office 4 January 2017 – 1 January 2023
- Preceded by: Paulo Gadelha
- Succeeded by: Mario Moreira

Personal details
- Born: Nísia Trindade Lima; 17 January 1958 (age 68) Rio de Janeiro, Brazil
- Party: PT (2026–present)
- Profession: Social scientist; sociologist; researcher; university professor
- Awards: Legion of Honour (Chevalier)

Academic background
- Education: Rio de Janeiro State University (BSS); Institute of Social and Political Studies (MPS, PhD)
- Thesis: O Movimento de Favelados do Rio de Janeiro: Políticas do Estado e Lutas Sociais (1989)
- Doctoral advisor: Luiz Antonio Machado da Silva

Nísia Trindade Lima (born 17 January 1958 in Rio de Janeiro) is a Brazilian social scientist, sociologist, researcher and university professor who had served as Minister of Health of Brazil from 2023 to 2025. She served as chairwoman of the Oswaldo Cruz Foundation from 2017 to 2023.

== Early life and education ==
Trindade was born in Rio de Janeiro in 1958, raised in the neighbourhood of Flamengo. She is the daughter of Nivaldo de Assis Lima, who had been a judge. Inspired by her high school sociology teacher, Nisia attended the Social Sciences School of the Rio de Janeiro State University (UERJ), in 1976.

During her university studies, Trindade joined a pro-democracy student movement and was part of the construction of the Human Sciences academic center of the university. After graduation, Trindade began teaching in state and municipal public schools in Rio. In 1982, she began her Master's Degree in Political Sciences at the Researches University Institute of Rio de Janeiro (IUPERJ), nowadays the Institute of Social and Political Studies (IESP), with the thesis "O Movimento de Favelados do Rio de Janeiro: Políticas do Estado e Lutas Sociais".

== Career ==
=== Academic career ===
During the elaboration of her thesis, Trindade joined the Casa de Oswaldo Cruz (COC) as researcher. In 1992, she began her studies for a doctor degree, also at IUPERJ. In 1997, she defended the thesis "Um sertão chamado Brasil: intelectuais, sertanejos e imaginação social", won the Best Doctor of Sociology Thesis of IUPERJ and it was published on book by the institution's publisher, with a second edition published by Hucitec in 2013.

Trindade was head of the research department of the COC (1989–1991), deputy director (1992–1994) and director between 1998 and 2005. Trindade was member of the elaboration team of Museu da Vida project, opened in 1999. In 2000, she received the Centenary Medal of the Oswaldo Cruz Foundation (Fiocruz). As COC director, she created the Post-graduation Program in Sciences and Health History (PPGHCS) in 2000.

In December 2020, Trindade was elected member of the Brazilian Academy of Sciences (ABC) in the Social Sciences category. On 1 January 2022, she became member of The World Academy of Sciences (TWAS) for the advance of science in developing countries.

As productivity researcher of higher education of the National Council for Scientific and Technological Development (CNPq), Trindade is recognized for her scientific production and for her actions to improve the dialogue between science and society. She is a reference in the Brazilian social thinking, sciences history and public health areas. She taught and advised students from all education levels, from lower education to post-doctorate, as professor at UERJ and Fiocruz. Trindade is the author of dozens of articles, books and chapters with reflections about the dilemmas of the national society, specially the division between urban and rural Brazil. In the field of social sciences, she contributes through many different initiatives for the strengthening of actions of research and teaching. One of her accomplishments was the creation of the Social Thinking Virtual Library (BVPS), in collaboration with the Federal University of Rio de Janeiro (UFRJ) and institutions networks.

=== Chairperson of Fiocruz, 2017–2023 ===
First woman as chairperson of Oswaldo Cruz Foundation in 120 of history, Trindade assumed office on 4 January 2017 as the most voted in the internal election. During her term, she was committed to the expansion of Fiocruz's role in the global health community. She participated in many programs and international networks in the fields of Science History and Health History. Nísia coordinated the Zika Social Sciences Network, which is part of Zika Alliance Network, a multination and multidisciplinary research group formed by 54 members from all over the world. She was member of the work group of the World Health Organization Global Action Plan, whose goal is to optimize the global research for the countries' health systems, and of the WHO consultant group for the implementation of the 2030 Agenda. Nísia was member of the International Director Committee to oversee and facilitate the implementation of the Nairobi Summit on CIPD25 and assumed the co-presidency of the UNSDSN Health for All Network in 2019.

During her tenure, Trindade led Fiocruz in the fight against the COVID-19 pandemic in Brazil. Some of the initiatives implemented were: the creation of a new Hospital Center in Manguinhos campus; the coordination of the Solidarity clinical trial of the World Health Organization in Brazil; measures for the increase of the national capacity of production of diagnostic kits and processing of tests results; the organization of emergency actions to aid the vulnerable population; the offer of virtual classes for professionals of the Unified Health System (SUS) in clinical magament and hospital attention for COVID-19 patients; and the launch of a biosecurity guide in schools. Fiocruz became a reference laboratory for the WHO regarding COVID-19 in the Americas.

Trindade was also responsible for the creation of COVID-19 Observatory, a transdisciplinary network which searches and systematizes epidemiological data; monitors and publishes informations to subside public politics about the spread of the new coronavirus and its social impacts in different regions of Brazil.

Trindade coordinated a technological deal in articulation with the Ministry of Health, the Oxford University, the pharmaceutic company AstraZeneca and local production units for clinical tests, sanitary registration and production of million of doses of the Oxford–AstraZeneca COVID-19 vaccine in Brazil.

On 11 January 2021, Trindade was reelected as chairwoman of Fiocruz, after she received 87% of the valid votes in the internal election.

=== Minister of Health, 2023–2025 ===
On 22 December 2022, Trindade was announced by president-elect Luiz Inácio Lula da Silva as Minister of Health, assuming office on 1 January 2023. Nísia is the first woman to head the Ministry. The choice was praised by WHO director-general Tedros Adhanom Ghebreyesus, both in a press conference and in his personal Twitter account.

On February 25, 2025, the government announced Nísia was to be fired. Alexandre Padilha was nominated as her successor on March 10, 2025.

== Other activities ==
- Coalition for Epidemic Preparedness Innovations (CEPI), Member of the Board (2021–2023)

== Recognition ==
On 1 September 2021, Trindade received the Knight degree of the National Order of the Legion of Honour (Ordre National de la Légion d'Honneur) of France, recognizing her actions as chair of the Foundation in the areas of science and health, specially the institution actions in the fight against the COVID-19 pandemic.

Government offices
Preceded by Paulo Gadelha	Chairwoman of Oswaldo Cruz Foundation; 2017–2023	Succeeded by Mario Moreira
Political offices
Preceded by Marcelo Queiroga	Minister of Health; 2023–2025	Succeeded by Alexandre Padilha
