= Federal University of Espírito Santo =

University in Brazil

Coordinates: 20°16′35″S 40°18′11″W

- Universidade Federal do Espírito Santo
- Shield of the Federal University of Espírito Santo
- Other names: UFES
- Motto: Latin: Docete Omnes Gentes (in English: "teach all people", in Portuguese: "ensinai todas as pessoas")
- Type: Public university
- Established: 1954 (Pharmacy School dates from 1930)
- Rector: Reinaldo Centoducatte
- Students: 22 500
- Undergraduates: 20 000
- Postgraduates: 2 500
- Location: Vitória, Espírito Santo, Brazil
- Campus: Vitória, Maruípe (Vitória), Alegre and São Mateus
- Website: www.ufes.br

The Federal University of Espírito Santo (Portuguese: Universidade Federal do Espírito Santo, Ufes) is a federal university with headquarters in the city of Vitória, capital of Espírito Santo state, in Brazil.

It is the largest and most important university in the state of Espírito Santo, southeastern Brazil. It is a public university, offering free, high-quality higher education by integrating teaching, research and outreach programs in all fields of knowledge. The university was founded in 1954, and today it comprises four campuses. Two are located in the capital city of Vitória (Goiabeiras headquarters and Maruípe), one is in the south (Alegre), and the other is in the north (São Mateus), together covering over 300,000 m^{2} of floor space in an area of more than 4 million m^{2}. In addition, there are 27 online learning centers throughout the state. Ufes has almost 25,000 students in more than 100 undergraduate courses and 64 graduate programs, 1,780 faculty and 1,650 staff.

In addition to teaching, both research and outreach are very strong at Ufes. Almost 1,000 papers are published per year in all fields of science, and there are more than 500 ongoing outreach projects, serving around 2 million people throughout the state. Ufes also offers facilities to the academic and wider communities, including theater, movie theater, art galleries, language center, libraries, museums, planetarium and astronomical observatory, auditoriums, sports center, marine station, experimental farms, a veterinary hospital and a university hospital, which is the main public health facility in the state of Espírito Santo, working as a reference in high-complexity medical care.

It is ranked as the 28th best university in Brazil according to Ranking Universitário Folha (RUF) operated by Folha de S.Paulo and the best university within its own state. In 2018 Ufes was ranked as the 75th best research institution in Ibero-America by the report by SCImago Institutions Ranking. In Latin America, Ufes is ranked among the top 100 according to the Times Higher Education World University Rankings and #114 according to the QS Top University Rankings.

== Notable alumni ==
- Sebastião Salgado
- Ethel Maciel
- Miriam Leitão

== See also ==
- List of federal universities of Brazil
