= Benjamin Zymler =

Brazilian engineer and government official (born 1956)

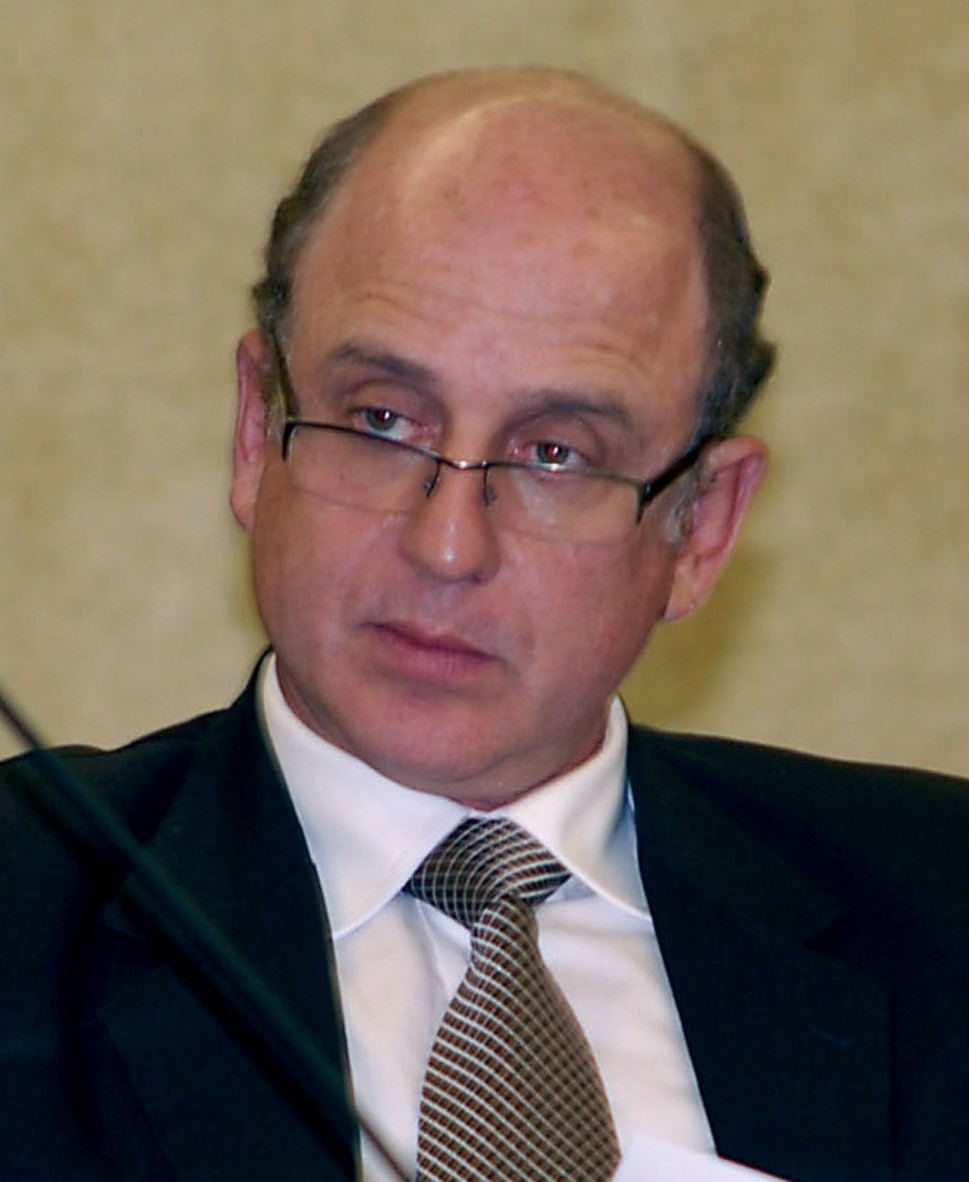

Personal details
- Born: 25 March 1956 (age 70) Rio de Janeiro, Brazil
- Education: Instituto Militar de Engenharia
- Occupation: civil servant, engineer, lawyer, writer

Benjamin Zymler (born 25 March 1956) is a Brazilian engineer and official in the government of Brazil.

Zymler is the controller general in the General Audit and Control Court, as the federal body responsible for the oversight of all Brazilian public accounts.

Zymler is based in Brasília. He is a graduate of the Military Institute of Engineering and of Law. He has written extensively on the subject of audit and public oversight in government.
