= Marcelo Queiroga =

Brazilian cardiologist, Minister of Health of Brazil

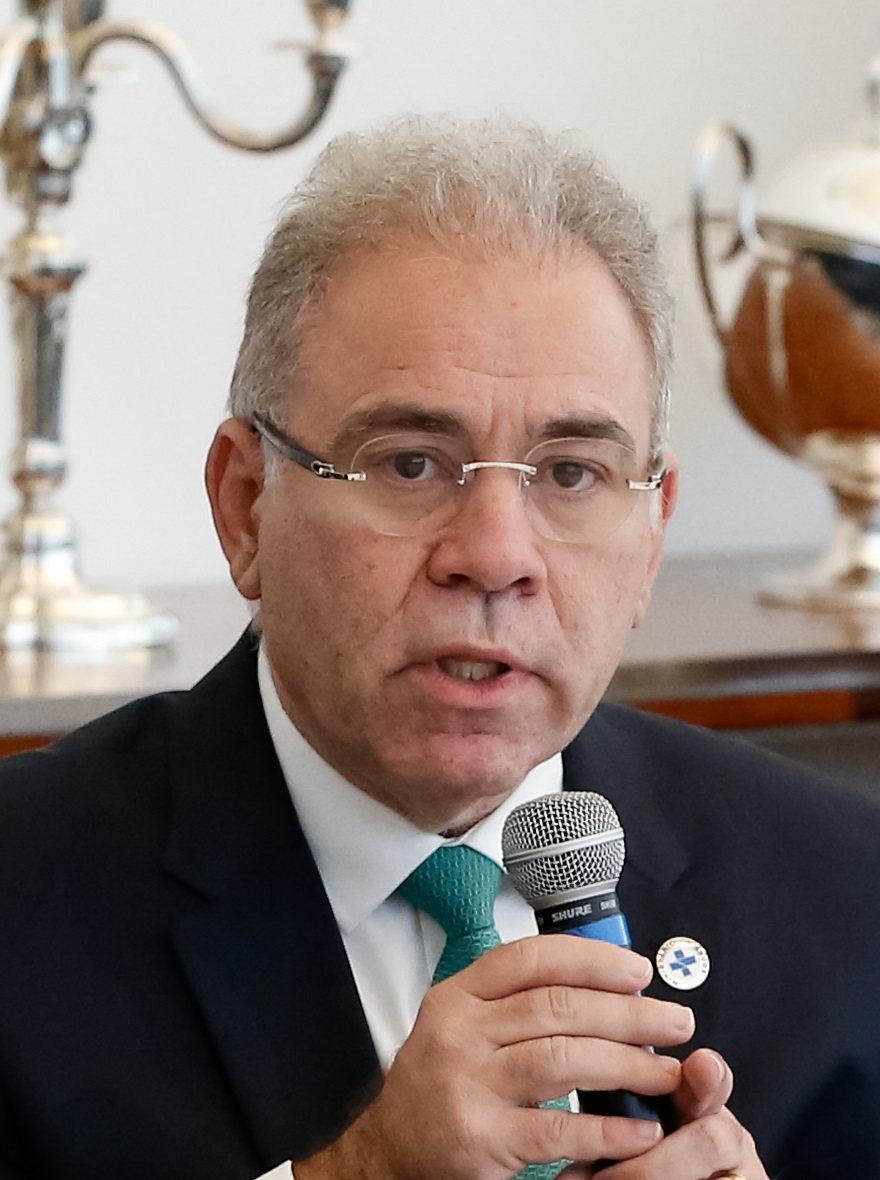

Minister of Health
- In office 23 March 2021 – 31 December 2022
- President: Jair Bolsonaro
- Preceded by: Eduardo Pazuello
- Succeeded by: Nísia Verônica Trindade Lima

Personal details
- Born: Marcelo Antônio Cartaxo Queiroga Lopes; 1 December 1963 (age 62) João Pessoa, Brazil
- Party: PL (Since 2023)
- Education: Federal University of Paraíba; University of Porto
- Occupation: Cardiologist

Marcelo Antônio Cartaxo Queiroga Lopes (born 1 December 1963) is a Brazilian cardiologist, who served as minister of health of Brazil, from 23 March 2021 to 31 December 2022. He was appointed by President Jair Bolsonaro to replace outgoing Minister Eduardo Pazuello. Queiroga is the fourth minister of health since the beginning of the COVID-19 pandemic in the country.

== Education and early career ==
Born on 1 December 1963 in the city of João Pessoa, Queiroga holds a degree in medicine from Federal University of Paraíba (1988). He completed his medical residency at the Hospital Adventista Silvestre (1991) and the Hospital Beneficência Portuguesa (1993). In 2010, he completed a doctorate in bioethics at the University of Porto.

== Career ==
He is currently Director of the Department of Hemodynamics and Interventional Cardiology at Hospital Alberto Urquiza Wanderley and interventional cardiologist at Hospital Metropolitano Dom José Maria Pires, both in the state of Paraíba. He also served as a Director of the Brazilian Society of Hemodynamics and Interventional Cardiology between 2012 and 2013. He is a member of the Regional Council of Medicine of the state of Paraíba.

Queiroga currently is serving as president of Brazilian Society of Cardiology (SBC).

== Minister of Health ==
Queiroga was appointed minister of health on 16 March 2021 to succeed outgoing minister Eduardo Pazuello, who served as a minister since April 2020.

Political offices
Preceded by Eduardo Pazuello	Minister of Health; 2021-2022	Succeeded by Nísia Verônica Trindade Lima
