= Eduardo Pazuello =

Brazilian general and politician

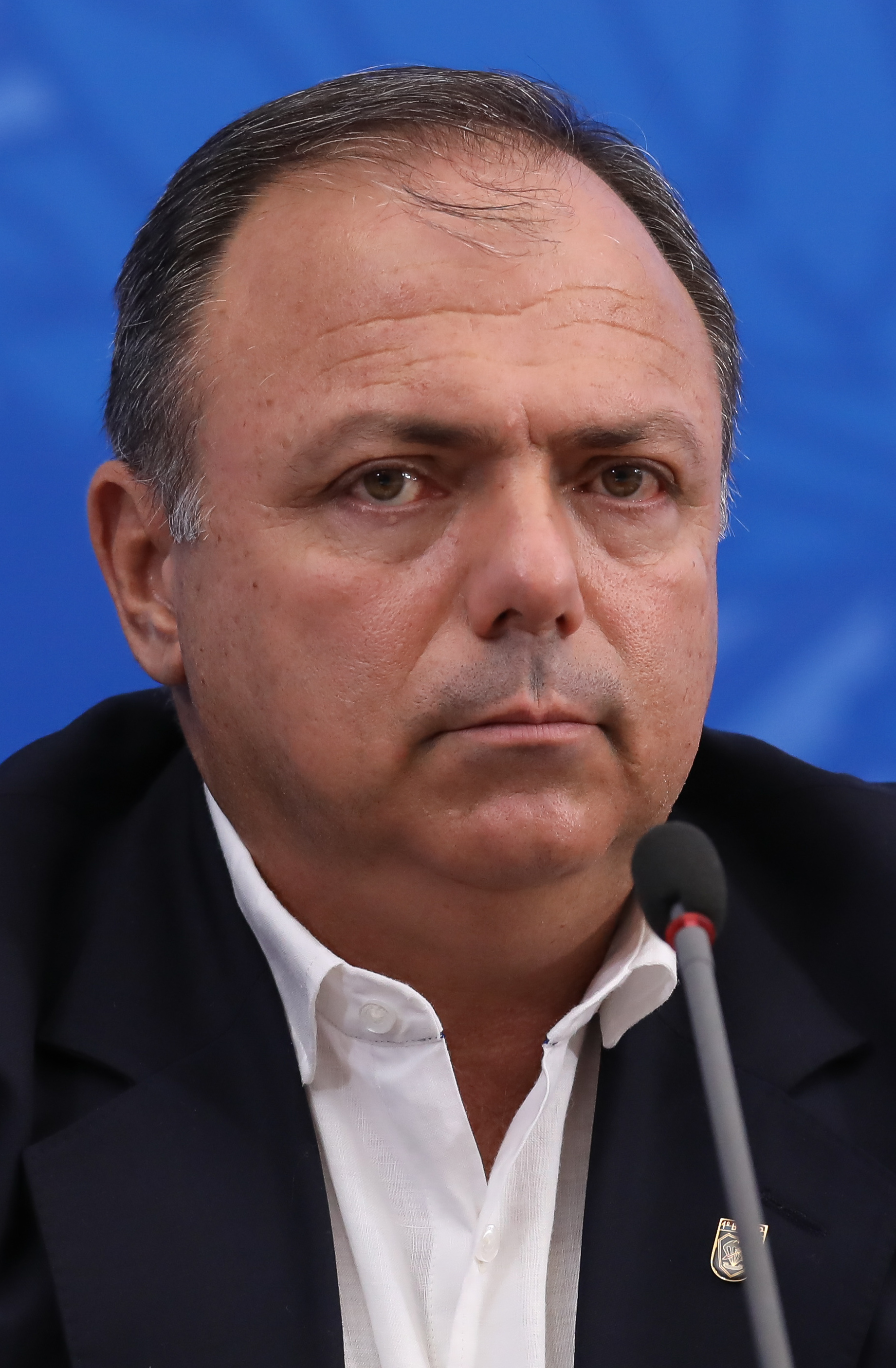
- Pazuello in 2020

Member of the Chamber of Deputies
- Incumbent
- Assumed office 1 February 2023
- Constituency: Rio de Janeiro

Minister of Health
- In office 16 September 2020 – 23 March 2021; Acting: 2 June 2020 – 16 September 2020
- President: Jair Bolsonaro
- Preceded by: Nelson Teich
- Succeeded by: Marcelo Queiroga

Executive Secretary of the Ministry of Health
- In office 28 April 2020 – 2 June 2020
- Minister: Nelson Teich
- Preceded by: João Gabbardo dos Reis
- Succeeded by: Antonio Elcio Franco

Personal details
- Born: 19 July 1963 (age 63) Rio de Janeiro, Brazil
- Party: PL (2022–present)
- Education: Agulhas Negras Military Academy
- Profession: Military

Military service
- Allegiance: Brazil
- Branch/service: Brazilian Army
- Rank: Divisional general
- Awards: Order of Aeronautical Merit

Eduardo Pazuello (born 19 July 1963) is a Brazilian divisional general of the Brazilian Army and politician, he served as Minister of Health between 2020 and 2021.

== Career ==
Pazuello was born in Rio de Janeiro to a prominent Moroccan-Jewish family. His grandfather, Abraham Joaquim Pazuello was born in Belém and was the son of Moroccan-Jewish parents. He established himself in Manaus during the 1930s. His father, Nissim Pazuello, was an entrepreneur. General Pazuello acted in the coordination of the Army troops during the 2016 Summer Olympics in Rio de Janeiro, and, since February 2018, coordinated Operation Reception, which takes care of Venezuelan refugees in Roraima, besides previously serving as Secretary of Finances in the State Government of Roraima during the federal intervention, where he announced his leaving in February 2019.

On 8 January 2020, left the coordination of the operation to command the 12th Military Region in Manaus, replacing Carlos Alberto Maciel Teixeira. In his sworn in, he stated that he'll continue the work in the defence of the Amazon.

He was nominated Executive Secretary of the Ministry of Health by former minister Nelson Teich to be the second in command, replacing João Gabbardo. In his nomination, Teich stated that he chose Pazuello due to his knowledge in logistics.

In May 2020, a report by Agência Sportlight revealed that Eduardo Pazuello alleged "non-commercial use" in a contract of 13 years signed between Infraero and a company that earned R$ 5,000 (US$ 760.55) per parachuting student, accusing him of administrative dishonesty.

Still in May 2020, website Diário do Centro do Mundo revealed that Pazuello had put soldiers to pull carts, instead of horses.

=== Minister of Health ===
Assumed, as acting minister, the Ministry of Health after the leaving of Nelson Teich, on 15 May 2020, during the COVID-19 pandemic in Brazil.

On 19 May 2020, Pazuello allowed the use of hydroxychloroquine and chloroquine for treatment against COVID-19, and, in June 2020, he was nominated Minister of Health and removed from his previous office as Executive Secretary.

On 6 August 2020, minister Pazuello affirmed that the vaccine for COVID-19, in tests in Brazil, is scheduled to be released in January 2021.

On 14 September 2020, president Jair Bolsonaro decided to promote Pazuello as Minister of Health. On 14 March 2021, Pazuello asked for resignation as Minister of Health, alleging health problems. Later he said that he isn't sick and will be in the office until President Jair Bolsonaro request the position.

Because of his negligence in the attempt to mitigate the spreading of the SARS-CoV-2, and its immediate consequence of a high death toll, he became associated to Pazuzu.

On 23 March 2021, Pazuello left the ministry of health.

=== Secretary of Strategic Affairs of the Presidency ===
Pazuello was announced as Secretary of Strategic Affairs of the Presidency on 1 June 2021.

Political offices
Preceded by João Gabbardo dos Reis	Executive Secretary of the Ministry of Health; 2020	Succeeded by Antonio Elcio Franco
Preceded by Nelson Teich	Minister of Health; 2020–2021	Succeeded by Marcelo Queiroga
