= Brazilian Health Regulatory Agency =

Brazilian government agency

- Agência Nacional de Vigilância Sanitária
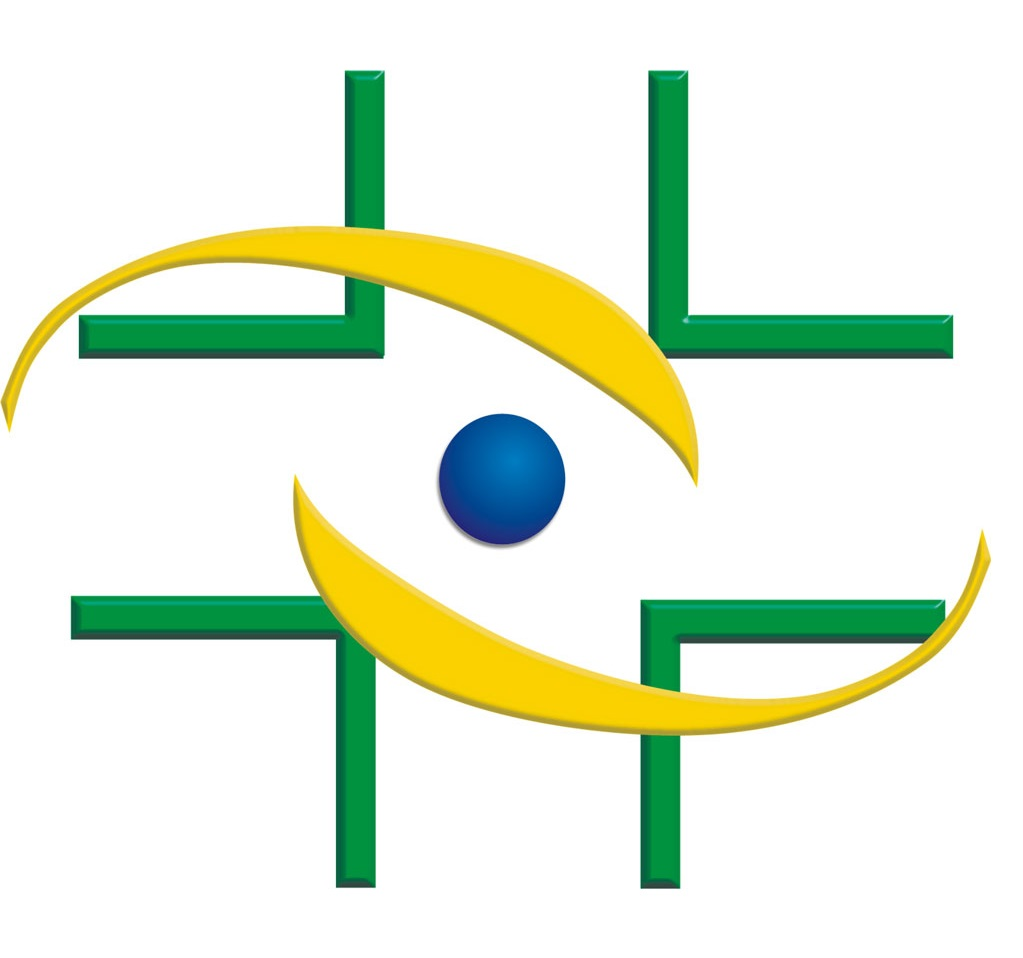

Agency overview
- Formed: 26 January 1999; 27 years ago
- Jurisdiction: Federative Republic of Brazil
- Headquarters: Brasília, Brazil
- Employees: 2206
- Annual budget: R$ 3.261.331.118.216,00 (2019)
- Agency executive: Antonio Barra Torres, President-Director
- Website: https://www.gov.br/anvisa/

The Brazilian Health Regulatory Agency (Portuguese: Agência Nacional de Vigilância Sanitária, Anvisa, literally National Health Surveillance Agency) is a regulatory body of the Brazilian government, created in 1999 during President Fernando Henrique Cardoso's term of office. It is responsible for the regulation and approval of pharmaceutical drugs, sanitary standards and regulation of the food industry.

The agency bills itself as "an independently administered, financially autonomous" regulatory body. It is administered by a five-member collegiate board of directors, who oversee five thematic directorates, assisted by a five-tier oversight structure. Since September 2018 the agency is headed by Antonio Barra Torres.

== Pesticide approvals and monitoring ==
Brazil is the world's largest consumer of pesticides. They are primarily used in the production of soy and corn. The number of approved pesticides increased "rapidly" between 2015 and 2019. Tereza Cristina, the agriculture minister, noted that "there is no general liberation" of new pesticide registrations and no reason for concern when pesticides are used as instructed.

The agency also runs a program for checking pesticide levels in food crops found in supermarkets. However, in May 2022, the agency reached a mark of 3 years without publishing its results, citing the COVID-19 pandemic as a reason. The agency also refused to publish partial results from the last tests performed in 2018 and 2019.

== See also ==
- Regulation of therapeutic goods
- Brazilian Nonproprietary Name
- Epidemic Intelligence Service
- World Health Organization
