= Nelson Teich =

Brazilian oncologist, former Minister of Health of Brazil

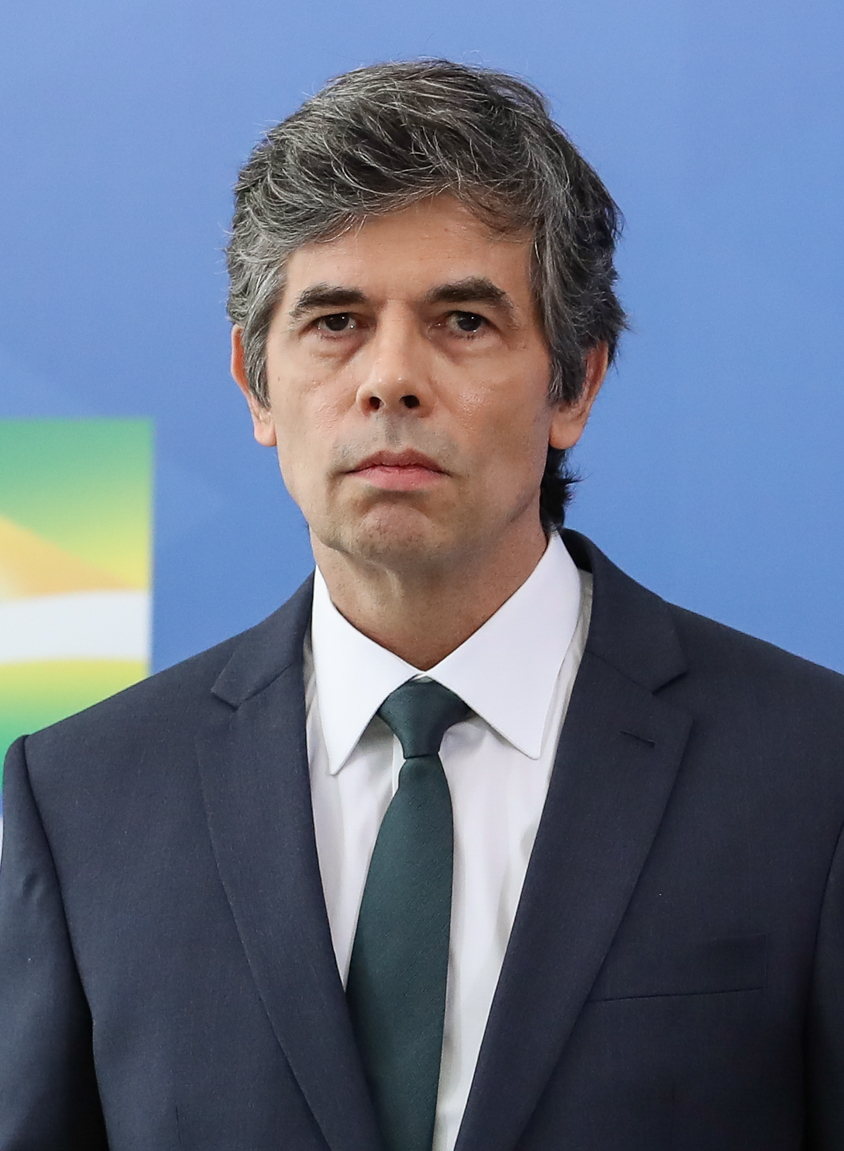
- Teich in April 2020

Minister of Health
- In office 17 April 2020 – 15 May 2020
- President: Jair Bolsonaro
- Preceded by: Luiz Henrique Mandetta
- Succeeded by: Eduardo Pazuello

Personal details
- Born: Nelson Luiz Sperle Teich; 24 July 1957 (age 69) Rio de Janeiro, Brazil
- Education: Rio de Janeiro State University; Federal University of Rio de Janeiro; University of York
- Occupation: Oncologist

Nelson Luiz Sperle Teich (born 24 July 1957) is a Brazilian oncologist, health consultant and entrepreneur who briefly served as Minister of Health of Brazil, from 17 April 2020 after being appointed by President Jair Bolsonaro to replace outgoing Minister Luiz Henrique Mandetta, to his resignation on 15 May 2020 after nearly a month at the helm.

== Education and early career ==
Born in Rio de Janeiro, Teich holds a degree in medicine from Rio de Janeiro State University (UERJ). He completed his medical residency at the Ipanema Hospital (1987) and studied clinical oncology at the Instituto Nacional de Câncer (1990). In 1998, he completed an MBA in health administration at the Institute for Postgraduate Studies and Research in Administration at UFRJ.

Teich also holds a master's degree in economic assessment from the University of York. He is a member of the editorial board of the American Journal of Medical Quality.

== Career ==
Teich founded the Integrated Clinical Oncology Group (COI) in 1990, in which he remained as president until 2018. In 2009, he founded the Institute of Management, Education and Research, a non-governmental organization, as president pro bono, with the objective of carrying out clinical research and projects, executing training and education programs in several areas related to care with cancer.

Between 2010 and 2011, he provided consultancy to Hospital Israelita Albert Einstein, in São Paulo.

He is currently the owner of Teich & Teich Health Care, a company that supports health management. He also served as an informal consultant in the electoral campaign of President Jair Bolsonaro in 2018, being one of the postulants to assume the post of Minister of Health, assumed by his predecessor Luiz Henrique Mandetta. Between September 2019 and January 2020, he served as advisor to the Secretary of Science and Technology for the Ministry of Health, Denizar Vianna.

== Minister of Health ==
Teich was appointed Minister of Health on 16 April 2020 to succeed outgoing minister Henrique Mandetta, who for weeks had disagreements with President Bolsonaro's positions on the policy of social distancing and the use of hydroxychloroquine during the COVID-19 pandemic. In his first speech as minister, Teich stated there would be no abrupt changes to the Ministry's current policies, and that health and the economy "are not competing against each other". Teich defends a comprehensive nationwide testing program and further research of treatment and vaccines. On 15 May 2020 Teich officially resigned as minister of health. While he did not give an official statement of his reasoning for resigning, Teich had publicly disagreed with Bolsonaro's government over the handling of the worsening COVID-19 outbreak on several occasions.

Political offices
Preceded by Luiz Henrique Mandetta	Minister of Health; 2020	Succeeded by Eduardo Pazuello
