= Luiz Henrique Mandetta =

Brazilian orthopedist, politician

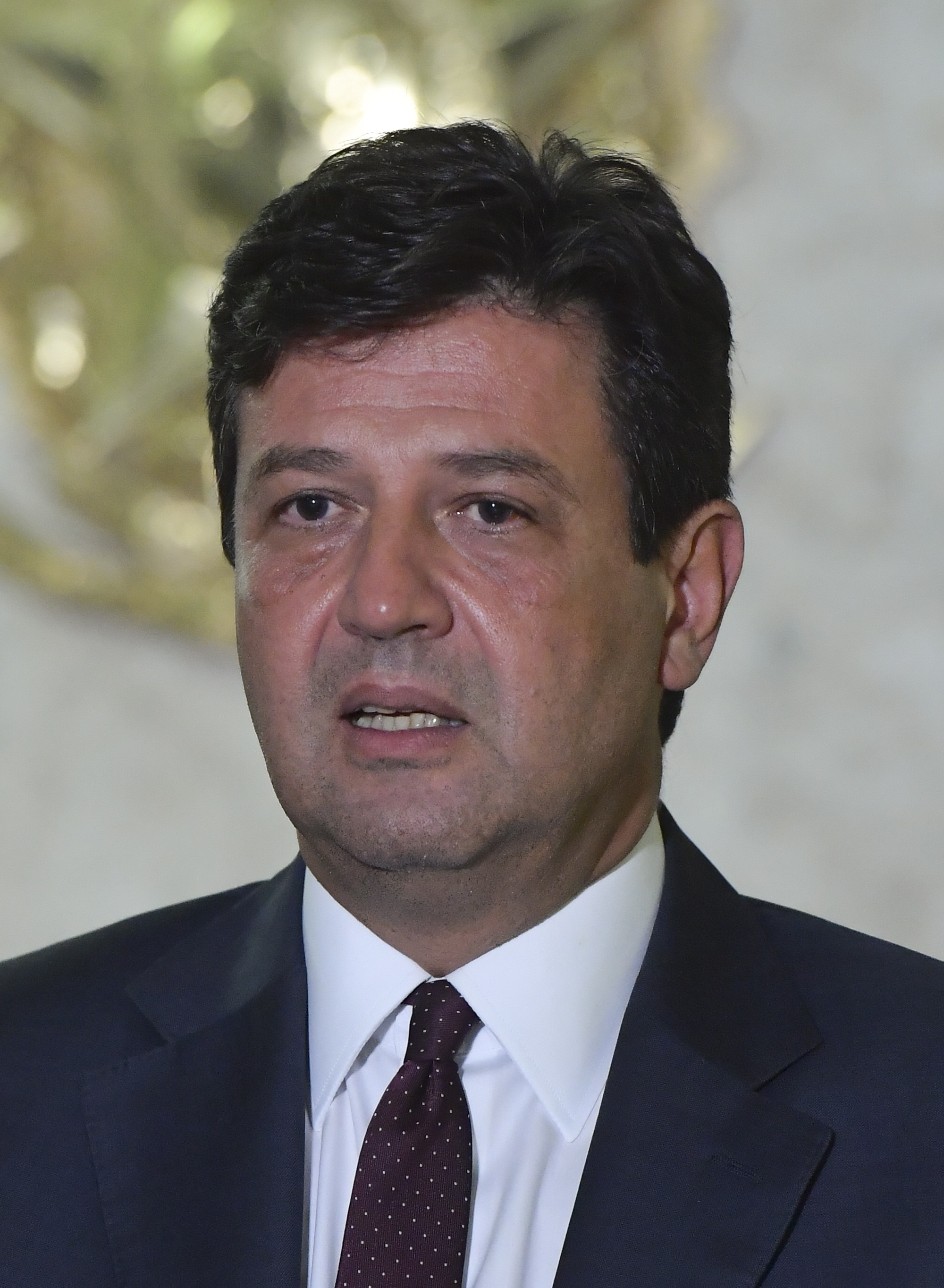
- Mandetta in 2020

Minister of Health
- In office 1 January 2019 – 16 April 2020
- President: Jair Bolsonaro
- Preceded by: Gilberto Occhi
- Succeeded by: Nelson Teich

Federal Deputy for Mato Grosso do Sul
- In office 1 February 2011 – 1 January 2019
- Constituency: Mato Grosso do Sul

Personal details
- Born: 30 November 1964 (age 61) Campo Grande, Mato Grosso, Brazil (Note: After Mato Grosso do Sul foundation in 1977, Campo Grande became its city and capital.)
- Party: UNIÃO (2022–present)
- Other political affiliations: PMDB (2002–2010); DEM (2010–2022)
- Parents: Hélio Mandetta (father); Maria Olga Solari (mother)
- Education: Gama Filho University; Federal University of Mato Grosso do Sul

Military service
- Allegiance: Brazil
- Branch/service: Brazilian Army
- Rank: Lieutenant

Luiz Henrique Mandetta (born 30 November 1964) is a Brazilian pediatric orthopedist and politician, member of the Brazil Union (UNIÃO). Mandetta was announced on 20 November 2018 as Minister of Health of president Jair Bolsonaro, replacing Gilberto Occhi. On 16 April 2020 he was fired by Bolsonaro after disagreements over social distancing policies during the coronavirus pandemic.

== Education and early career ==
Mandetta is a graduated medic by the University Gama Filho, with specialization in orthopedics by the service of orthopedics of the Federal University of Mato Grosso do Sul and sub-specialization in pediatric orthopedics by the Scottish Rite Hospital for Children in Atlanta. He was military medic, as lieutenant, in the Army Central Hospital.

== Political career ==
=== Member of Congress, 2011–2019 ===
Mandetta has been an elected federal deputy since the 2010 elections for the 54th Congress; he was reelected in 2014 for the 55th Congress.

During his time in Congress, Mandetta was most well known for opposing health policies of the leftist Workers Party government, and in particular its “Mais Medicos” program which brought Cuban doctors to Brazil's most far-flung corners. He voted for the impeachment of Dilma Rousseff. Later, he was in favor of the Constitutional Amendment n.º 95 of 2016, that established a new tax regime. In April 2017, voted in favor of the Labour Reform. In August 2017, voted for the progress of the complaint against president Michel Temer.

=== Minister of Health, 2019–2020 ===
On 20 November 2018, Mandetta was confirmed by president-elect Jair Bolsonaro to assume the Ministry of Health. About the accusations of irregularities when he was Secretary of Health of Campo Grande, Mandetta affirmed a week before the confirmation that he had talked to Bolsonaro about the details of the case. According to him, the president-elect said that only the complaint wouldn't be a reason to block his nomination. Mandetta is currently under investigation for alleged procurement fraud, influence peddling and undeclared campaign donations.

Mandetta has received widespread notoriety in 2020 for his handling of the COVID-19 pandemic in Brazil. The Health Minister has contradicted President Bolsonaro on numerous occasions; while Mandetta has defended social distancing measures in order to prevent the spread of COVID-19, Bolsonaro is an opponent of such measures and has criticized state governors who implemented lockdowns in their states.

According to a Datafolha poll from April 2020, Mandetta had a 76% approval rating from Brazilians for his handling of the pandemic; 82% of the responses in support of Mandetta were from self-proclaimed Bolsonaro supporters. The president's ministers Paulo Guedes (Economy) and Sergio Moro (Justice and Public Security) have also been against the president's position on social distancing and have publicly supported Mandetta. Bolsonaro has expressed his dissatisfaction with the minister multiple times, and reportedly decided to dismiss Mandetta on 6 April 2020 before backing down due to pressure from his advisors.

Mandetta announced on 16 April 2020 that he had been fired by Bolsonaro, with oncologist Nelson Teich as Mandetta's successor as Minister of Health, though Teich would also resign a month later.

== Personal life ==
Mandetta is a Freemason, and Roman Catholic.

== Notes ==
Political offices
Preceded by Gilberto Occhi	Minister of Health; 2019–2020	Succeeded by Nelson Teich
