= Ministry of Health (Brazil) =

Brazilian federal ministry

- Portuguese: Ministério da Saúde

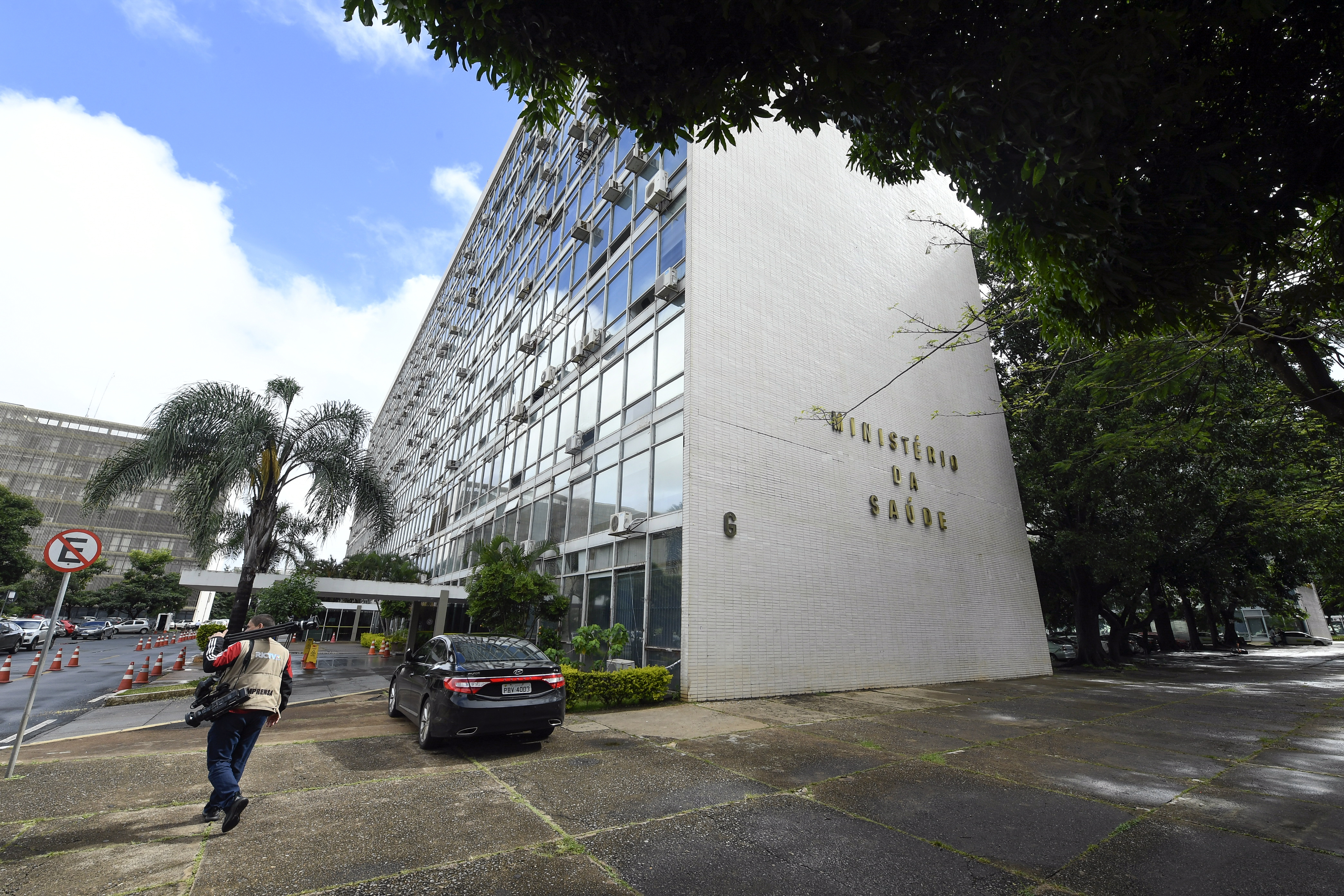

Agency overview
- Formed: 6 August 1953; 73 years ago
- Type: Ministry
- Jurisdiction: Federal government of Brazil
- Headquarters: Esplanada dos Ministérios, Bloco G Brasília, Federal District
- Annual budget: $160.9 b BRL (2022)
- Agency executives: Alexandre Padilha, Minister; Adriano Massuda, Executive-Secretary; Felipe Proenço, Secretary of Primary Health Care; Mozart Tabosa Sales, Secretary of Specialized Health Care; Rivaldo Venâncio, Secretary of Health and Environmental Surveillance; Ricardo Weibe Tapeba, Secretary of Indigenous Health
- Website: www.gov.br/saude/

The Ministry of Health (Portuguese: Ministério da Saúde) is a cabinet-level federal ministry in Brazil. Since March 2025, the Health Minister is Alexandre Padilha. The Ministry oversees the Sistema Único de Saúde, the world’s largest integrated public health system.

== History ==
The first public health guidelines in the country were created by the monarchy in 1808. Despite this, the first Ministry with actions in the health area was created in 1930, during the government of Getúlio Vargas, under the name of Ministry of Education and Public Health (Brazilian Portuguese: Ministério dos Negócios da Educação e Saúde Pública). In 1937 it was renamed Ministry of Education and Health.

On 25 July 1953 it was defined as Ministry of Health. In 1956, linked to this ministry, the National Department of Rural Endemics emerged, with the purpose of carrying out the services to combat endemic diseases in the country, such as malaria, leishmaniasis, chagas disease, plague, brucellosis, yellow fever, among others.

In the early 1960s, social inequality, marked by low income per capita and a high concentration of wealth, gained dimension in the discourse of health workers around the relationship between health and development. The planning of growth and improvement goals led to what some researchers called the great panacea of the 1960s (global planning and health planning). The proposals to adapt public health services to the reality diagnosed by developmental health workers had important milestones, such as the formulation of the National Health Policy in the management of the then minister, Estácio Souto-Maior, in 1961, with the objective of redefining the identity of the Ministry Health and bring it in line with the progress made in the economic-social sphere. Another milestone in the history of health at the ministerial level occurred in 1963, with the holding of the III National Health Conference (CNS), convened by Minister Wilson Fadul, an ardent defender of the municipalization thesis. The Conference proposed the reorganization of medical and health care services and general alignments to determine a new division of attributions and responsibilities between the Federation's political and administrative levels, aiming, above all, at municipalization.

In 1964, the military took over the government and Raymundo de Brito established himself as minister of health and reiterated the purpose of incorporating the Social Security medical assistance to the Ministry of Health, within the proposal to establish a National Health Plan according to the guidelines of the Third National Health Conference. On 25 February 1967, with the implementation of the Federal Administrative Reform, it was established that the Ministry of Health would be responsible for the National Health Policy.

In 1974, there was an internal reform in which the Health and Medical Assistance Secretariats were included, becoming the National Health Secretariat, to reinforce the concept that there was no dichotomy between Public Health and Medical Assistance. In the same year, the Superintendency of Public Health Campaigns (SUCAM) came under the direct subordination of the Minister of State, in order to allow him greater technical and administrative flexibility, elevating himself to a first-rate body. The Health Coordinators were created, comprising five regions: the Amazon, Northeast, Southeast, South and Midwest, with the Federal Health Stations included in these subordinate areas. Thus, the Federal Health Departments ceased to integrate top-level bodies. The Social Communication Coordination is also created as an organ of direct and immediate assistance to the Minister of State and the Anti-Toxic Prevention Council is established, as a collegiate body, directly subordinate to the Minister of State.

In the 1980s, the 1988 Federal Constitution stands out, which determined that it was the duty of the State to guarantee health to the entire population, creating the Unified Health System (SUS). In 1990, the National Health Law was approved by the National Congress, which then detailed the functioning of the System.

== Structure ==
- General Ombudsman's Office of the Unified Health System - OuvSUS
- Advisory Board for Social Participation and Diversity - APSD
- Special Advisory Office for Parliamentary and Federal Affairs - ASPAR
- Special Advisory Office for International Affairs - AISA
- Special Advisory Office for Social Communication - ASCOM
- Special Advisory Office for Internal Control - AECI
- Legal Consulting - CONJUR
- National Audit Department of the Unified Health System - DenaSUS
- Executive Secretariat - SE
- Secretariat of Primary Health Care - SAPS
  - Family Health Department - DESF
  - Department of Comprehensive Care Management - DGCI
  - Department of Health Promotion - DEPROS
  - Department of Strategies, Accreditation and Components of Primary Health Care - DEAPS
- Secretariat for Specialized Healthcare - SAES
  - Department of Hospital, Home and Emergency Care - DAHU
  - Department of Specialized and Thematic Care - DAET
  - Department for Certification of Charitable Entities Providing Social Assistance in Health - DCEBAS
  - Department of Healthcare Regulation and Control - DRAC
  - Department of Mental Health, Alcohol and Other Drugs - DESMAD
  - Department of Strategies for the Expansion and Qualification of Specialized Care - DEEQAE
  - Department of Cancer Care - DECAN
  - Directorate of the National Health System Force
  - Department of Hospital Management in the State of Rio de Janeiro - DGH
  - National Institutes
- Secretariat of Science, Technology and Innovation in Health - SCTIE
  - Department of the Economic-Industrial Complex of Health - DECIS
  - Department of Pharmaceutical Assistance and Strategic Supplies - DAF
  - Department of Science and Technology - DECIT
  - Department of Management and Incorporation of Health Technologies - DGITS
- Secretariat for Health and Environmental Surveillance - SVSA
  - Department of the National Immunization Program - DPNI
  - Department of Communicable Diseases - DEDT
  - Department of Epidemiological Analysis and Surveillance of Non-Communicable Diseases - DAENT
  - Department of Strategic Actions in Epidemiology and Health and Environmental Surveillance - DAEVS
  - Department of HIV/AIDS, Tuberculosis, Viral Hepatitis and Sexually Transmitted Infections - DATHI
  - Department of Environmental Health and Occupational Health Surveillance - DVSAT
  - Department of Public Health Emergencies - DEMSP
  - Evandro Chagas Institute - IEC
  - National Primate Center - CENP
- Indigenous Health Secretariat - SESAI
  - Department of Primary Healthcare for Indigenous Peoples - DAPSI
  - Department of Projects and Environmental Determinants of Indigenous Health - DEAMB
  - Department of Indigenous Health Management – DGESI
  - Special Indigenous Health Districts - DSEI
- Secretariat for Labor Management and Health Education - SGTES
  - Department of Health Education Management - DEGES
  - Department of Management and Regulation of Work in Health - DEGERTS
  - Department of Management and Professional Provision for the SUS (Brazilian Public Health System) - DEGEPS
- Secretariat of Information and Digital Health - SEIDIGI
  - Department of Digital Health and Innovation - DESD
  - Information and Informatics Department of the Unified Health System - DataSUS
  - Department of Monitoring, Evaluation and Dissemination of Strategic Health Information - DEMAS

== See also ==
- List of ministers of health of Brazil
