= COVID-19 CPI =

Brazilian parliamentary commission of inquiry

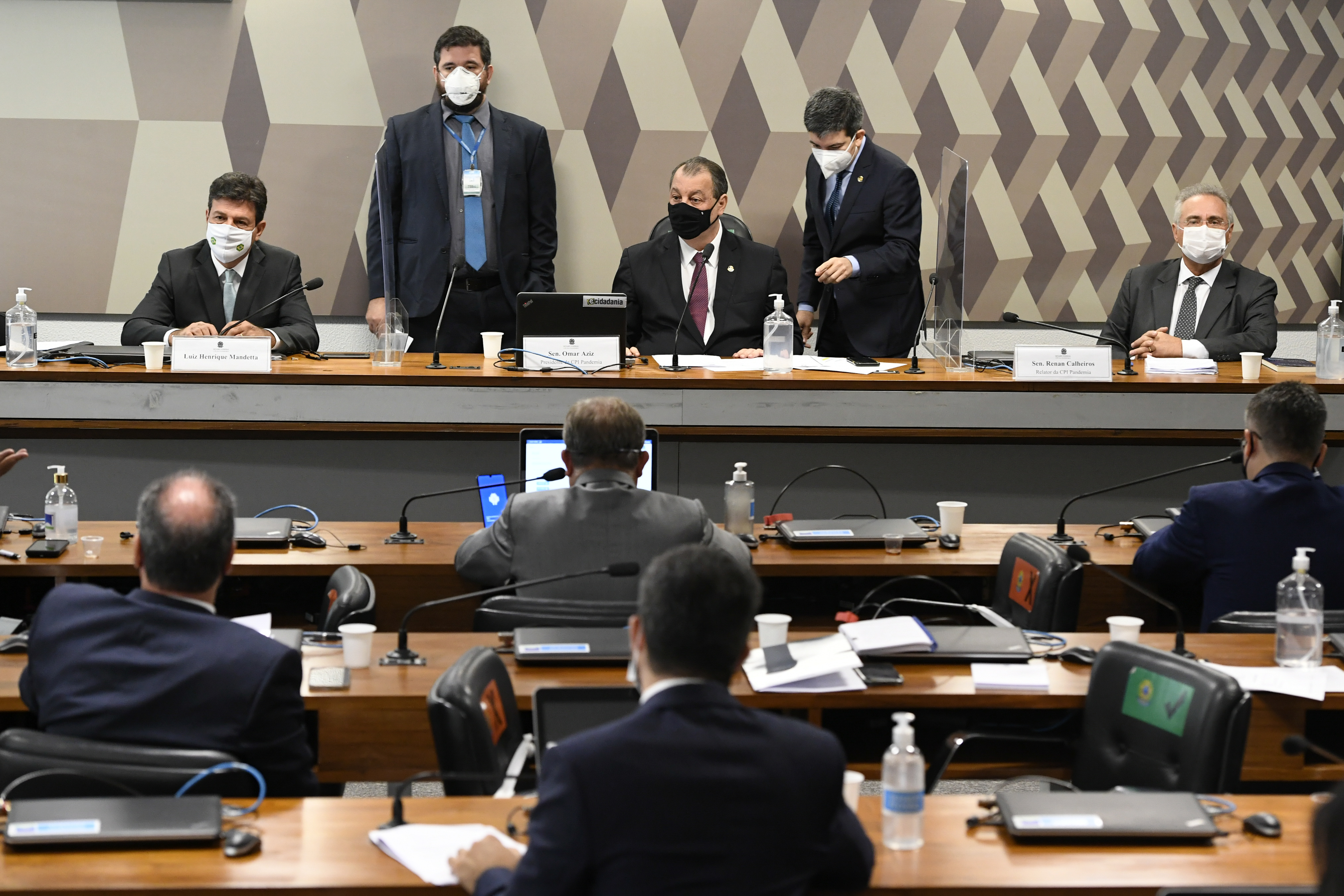
- May 4, 2021 COVID-19 CPI Session
- Native name: CPI da COVID-19
- Date: April 27 – October 26, 2021
- Time: (UTC−3)
- Duration: 5 months and 29 days
- Venue: Brazilian Senate
- Location: Brazil
- Also known as: Pandemic CPI; Coronavirus CPI; COVID CPI
- Type: Parliamentary Commission of Inquiry
- Cause: COVID-19 pandemic in Brazil and Brazilian sanitary crisis in 2021
- Motive: Brazilian government actions during the pandemic
- Participants: Members

The COVID-19 CPI, also known as Pandemic CPI, Coronavirus CPI, or simply COVID CPI, was a parliamentary inquiry commission from Brazil, with the goal to investigate alleged omissions and irregularities in federal government actions during the COVID-19 pandemic in Brazil. It was created on April 13, 2021 and officially installed in the Brazilian Senate on April 27, 2021. It ended with the voting of the final report on October 26, 2021.

== Origin ==
The parliamentary commission of inquiry ("CPI" in Portuguese) was created by federal senator Randolfe Rodrigues (REDE-AP) because of the health crisis in the country, highlighting in his text alleged mistakes and omissions of the federal executive in the health protocols of its responsibility. Rodrigues filed a request for a CPI on February 4, 2021, to investigate the points listed.

=== Goals ===
The objective of the request presented by Randolfe Rodrigues is to discuss the actions of the federal government in confronting the pandemic, in a scenario in which Brazil ranks second in the world in number of deaths from COVID-19. The CPI's main focus is the allegations that the federal government would have been against sanitary measures such as social distancing and mandatory use of face mask. It is also accused of delays in the purchase of vaccines, as well as the disclosure of ineffective treatments and the use of public money to buy drugs without scientific proof of effectiveness. The dismissals of health ministers, such as Luiz Henrique Mandetta and Nelson Teich, will also be the target of clarifications, as well as the cause of the lack of oxygen in Manaus hospitals, among others.

=== Report from Federal Court of Accounts ===
According to the portal UOL, the Bolsonaro government has not set aside money in 2021 for the Ministry of Health and until March, had not passed on resources to states and municipalities to deal with the COVID-19 pandemic. This is what the report of the Federal Court of Accounts (TCU) pointed out, whose documents will be attached to the COVID-19 CPI. According to the court inspectors, there were no appropriations for expenses in fighting the pandemic in the 2021 Budget Law prepared by the Government. In response, the Ministry of Economy said in a statement that: "this report has not yet been considered by the Plenary of the Court and has not resulted in a judgment, because other ministers have requested views". The Ministry of Health did not want to comment.

In another report released earlier, the TCU accused the Bolsonaro government of altering documents to evade responsibility for leading the actions to combat and confront the pandemic, as well as failing to monitor the supply of drugs and intubation kits to hospitals.

== Investigation lines ==
=== Herd immunity ===
Herd immunity by infection (also called vaccine-free herd immunity in CPI) is an arbitrary thesis to the consensus of the world scientific community and based on the thought that antibodies can be acquired by natural infection and collective immunity achieved without vaccines. It is known that herd immunity from naturally acquired infection has even been considered by authorities in Brazil, the UK, and the US as a strategy to mitigate the COVID-19 pandemic, but infectologists have made it clear that this is not even a hypothesis that can be considered and that vaccination is the only acceptable way for a possible herd immunity.

One line of investigation of the CPI is whether the Federal Government through a supposed "parallel ministry" adopted herd immunity by infection as a strategy in the fight against COVID-19 due to the repeated statements issued by President Jair Bolsonaro and Osmar Terra about herd immunization and defending that the virus, already underway, would not be stopped by isolation, and that the epidemic would only end after 70% of the population was infected. In statements to the CPI, General Eduardo Pazuello confirmed having been contacted superficially by Osmar Terra about the thesis that the health crisis would naturally cease after this percentage of people were infected.

=== Suspicions of corruption ===
In its third phase the CPI focuses on suspicions of corruption involving the federal government and private companies to mitigate the COVID-19 pandemic. Along these lines, the investigations into the purchase of the Indian vaccine Covaxin are considered to have brought the most relevant among all the revelations made by the commission of inquiry. One of the reasons is that the episode directly involves President Jair Bolsonaro to a possible crime of prevarication which is an infraction provided for in article 319 of the Brazilian Penal Code. At this stage, Bolsonaro's supporters have demanded that the CPI be extended to investigate also possible cases of corruption in the Northeast Consortium.

== Decision from the Supreme Federal Court ==
=== Writ of Security ===
Minister Luís Roberto Barroso of the Supreme Federal Court (STF), in a letter filed by Senators Jorge Kajuru (PODE-GO) and Alessandro Vieira (Cidadania-SE), ordered Senate President Rodrigo Pacheco (DEM-MG) to create the commission because the number of signatures was more than necessary. In the decision, the minister fomented the thesis, arguing that it would be the responsibility of the president of the Board of the Legislative House to define the agenda and priorities, but that such prerogative could not hurt the constitutional right of the third of the parliamentarians in favor of the creation of the CPI.

The president of the Senate accepted the request, but criticized what he called Barroso's decision as "political platform for 2022," stating that the CPI could have a role in anticipating the political-electoral discussion of 2022, which would not be appropriate for the moment the nation is going through. The next day, by 10 votes to 1, the STF ruled that the COVID-19 CPI is constitutional.

=== Reactions ===
Injunction in the writ of security, under the rapporteurship of the minister Barroso, ordering the creation of the COVID's CPI

In response to the Supreme Court's validation of the CPI, impeachment proceedings against the Court's ministers gained momentum in the Senate. Two senators filed a request for impeachment against Luís Roberto Barroso because of the monocratic decision. There has also been talk of a bill on limiting these single decrees.

A day after Barroso's decision, President Jair Bolsonaro in a conversation with supporters, and in a post on Twitter criticized the minister's monocratic decision on the creation of the CPI. He typed, saying, "Barroso omits himself by not determining the Senate to install impeachment proceedings against a Supreme Minister, even at the request of more than 3 million Brazilians. He lacks moral courage and has inappropriate political militancy". Hours later, the STF released a press release on the suit saying, "The ministers that make up the Court make decisions in accordance with the Constitution and the laws." It also says that, "within the democratic state of law, challenges to them (decisions) must be made in the proper appeals, contributing to the republican spirit prevailing in our country."

Senator Jorge Kajuru disclosed conversations between him and President Jair Bolsonaro to BandNews FM radio between April 11 and 12. In the wiretap, the president asked that the CPI also include investigations against mayors and governors. In it, there were also threats, attacks, and offenses against Senator Randolfe Rodrigues.

=== Habeas Corpus ===
The STF was asked to rule on a request by the Federal Attorney General's Office to allow former minister General Eduardo Pazuello to remain silent during testimony at the CPI and also to ensure that he would be immune from certain measures, such as imprisonment in case of non-compliance. The rapporteur of the case, minister Ricardo Lewandowski, granted the habeas corpus order.

The minister also denied the habeas corpus order, filed by the defense of Mayra Pinheiro, requesting the possibility of remaining silent and safe conduct to eventual arrest. However, after a request for reconsideration, he authorized her to remain silent about the facts that occurred between December 2020 and January 2021.

=== Argument of Noncompliance with a Fundamental Precept ===
Governors from 17 states and the Federal District filed, in the Supreme Federal Court, a plea of breach of fundamental precept (ADPF) with a request for an injunction to suspend the summoning of governors to testify in the Parliamentary Inquiry Commission.

The Rapporteur of the action, minister Rosa Weber, of the Federal Supreme Court, determined that the president of the COVID CPI, senator Omar Aziz (PSD-AM) should present information within five days, and that the Attorney General of the Union and the Attorney General of the Republic should also manifest within five days.

== Members ==
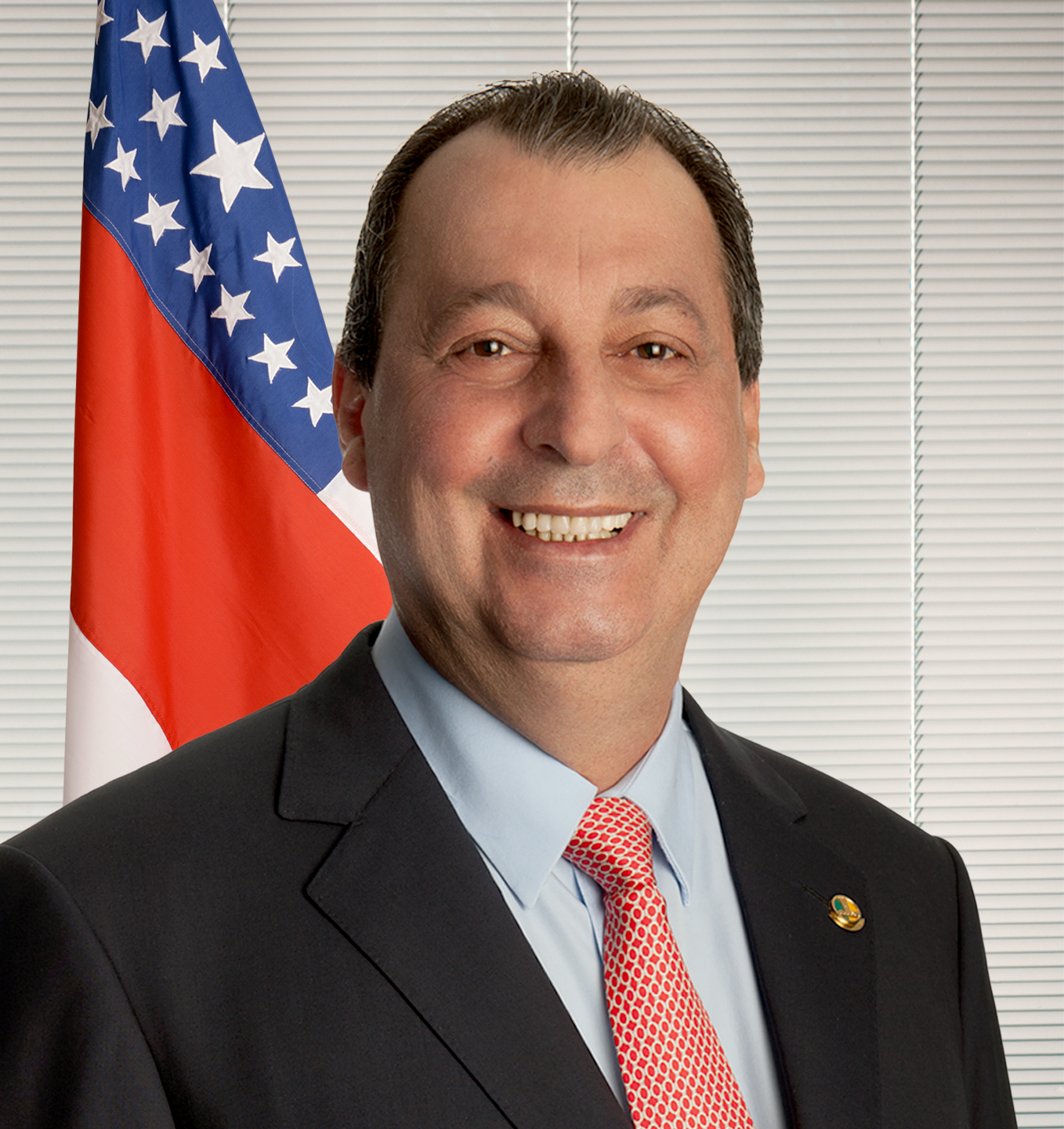
Omar Aziz (PSD-AM), former governor of Amazonas, was elected president of the commission.

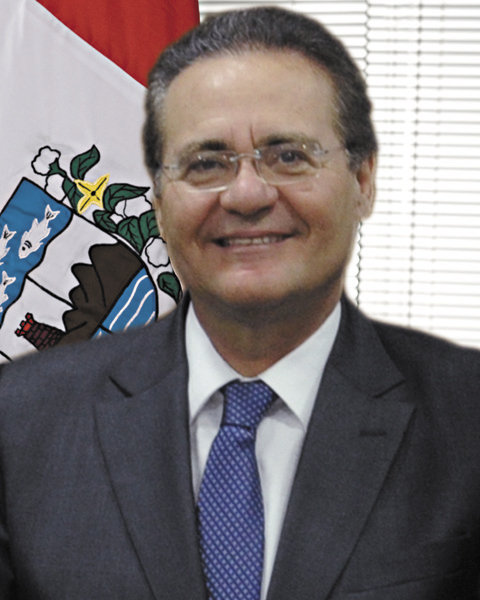
Renan Calheiros (MDB-AL), was chosen as rapporteur.

=== Permanent ===
- Eduardo Braga (MDB-AM)
- Renan Calheiros (MDB-AL and rapporteur)
- Ciro Nogueira (PP-PI)
- Otto Alencar (PSD-BA)
- Omar Aziz (PSD-AM, CPI President)
- Tasso Jereissati (PSDB-CE)
- Eduardo Girão (PODE-CE)
- Humberto Costa (PT-PE)
- Randolfe Rodrigues (Rede-AP, CPI creator and vice-president)
- Jorginho Mello (PL-SC)
- Marcos Rogério (DEM-RO)

=== Substitutes ===
- Jader Barbalho (MDB-PA)
- Angelo Coronel (PSD-BA),
- Marcos do Val (PODE-ES),
- Rogério Carvalho (PT-SE),
- Alessandro Vieira (Cidadania-SE),
- Luis Carlos Heinze (PP-RS)
- Zequinha Marinho (PSC-PA)

=== Female group ===
Because no female senators were chosen for the composition of the CPI, neither as full or substitutes members, the Federal Senate women's group made an agreement within the commission so that one of them can ask questions to the CPI's witnesses; however, they will not be able to present requests or vote, a possibility that is restricted only to CPI members. A rotation format was chosen, so that there is alternation among the female senators. The female senators that make up the rotation are:

- Daniella Ribeiro (PP-PB)
- Eliziane Gama (Cidadania-MA)
- Kátia Abreu (PP-TO)
- Leila Barros (PSB-DF)
- Mara Gabrilli (PSDB-SP)
- Maria do Carmo Alves (DEM-SE)
- Mailza Gomes (PP-AC)
- Nilda Gondim (MDB-PB)
- Rose de Freitas (MDB-ES)
- Simone Tebet (MDB-MS)
- Soraya Thronicke (PSL-MS)
- Zenaide Maia (PROS-RN)

== Summoned and invited ==
During the course of the work, they were invited and summoned, to be questioned, as witnesses or investigated:

Name	Date(s)	Position held	Heard as
Luiz Henrique Mandetta	May 4, 2021	Former Minister of Health	Witness
Nelson Teich	May 5, 2021	Former Minister of Health	Witness
Marcelo Queiroga	May 6, 2021	Minister of Health	Witness
Antonio Barra Torres	May 11, 2021	Director-President of the Brazilian Health Regulatory Agency (Anvisa)	Witness
Fábio Wajngarten	May 12, 2021	Former secretary of the Special Secretariat of Social Communication (SECOM)	Witness
Carlos Murillo	May 13, 2021	Former General Manager and representative of the Pfizer laboratory in Brazil	Witness
Ernesto Araújo	May 18, 2021	Former Minister of Foreign Affairs	Witness
Eduardo Pazuello	May 19–20, 2021	Former Minister of Health	Witness
Mayra Pinheiro	May 25, 2021	Work and Education Management Secretary of the Ministry of Health	Witness
Dimas Covas	May 27, 2021	Director from Instituto Butantan	Witness
Nise Yamaguchi	June 1, 2021	Medical Oncologist and Immunologist	Invited
Luana Araújo	June 2, 2021	Former Extraordinary Covid and Covid Secretary	Invited
Marcelo Queiroga (Resummed)	June 8, 2021	Minister of Health	Witness
Élcio Franco	June 9, 2021	Former Executive Secretary of the Ministry of Health	Witness
Wilson Lima (PSC) (Did not attend)	June 10, 2021	Governor from Amazonas	Witness
Cláudio Maierovich	June 11, 2021	Health physician and former president of Anvisa and Fiocruz	Invited
Natália Pasternak Taschner	June 11, 2021	Microbiologist and researcher at the University of São Paulo (USP)	Invited
Marcellus Campelo	June 15, 2021	Secretary of Health of the State of Amazonas	Witness
Wilson Witzel (Left amid questioning)	June 16, 2021	Former Governor from Rio de Janeiro	Witness
Carlos Wizard (Did not attend)	June 17, 2021	Businessman	Witness
Alexandre Marques (Postponed)	June 17, 2021	Ex-auditor of the TCU	Witness
Ricardo Ariel Zimerman	June 18, 2021	Doctor	Invited
Francisco Eduardo Cardoso Alves	June 18, 2021	Doctor	Invited
Osmar Terra	June 22, 2021	Congressman	Witness
Francisco Emerson Maximiano (Postponed)	June 23, 2021	Owner of Precisa Medicamentos	Witness
Filipe Martins	June 24, 2021	International Affairs Aide to Presidency of Republic	Witness
Pedro Hallal	June 25, 2021	Epidemiologist, researcher and professor at the Federal University of Pelotas (UFPel)	Invited
Jurema Werneck	June 25, 2021	Representative of Amnesty International	Invited
Luis Miranda	June 25, 2021	Congressman	Invited
Luis Ricardo Miranda	June 25, 2021	Public employee at the Ministry of Health	Invited
Fausto Junior (MDB)	June 29, 2021	State Deputy from Amazonas	Summoned
Carlos Wizard	June 30, 2021	Businessman	Investigated with Habeas Corpus
Luiz Paulo Dominghetti	July 1, 2021	Represented of Davati Medical Supply	Summoned
Regina Célia Oliveira	July 6, 2021	Fiscal of the contract with Precisa/Bharat Biotech	Summoned
Roberto Dias	July 7, 2021	Ex-Director of Logistics at the Ministry of Health	Summoned. Arrested for perjury by order of Omar Aziz, after the end of the session
Francieli Fantinato	July 8, 2021	Ex-coordinator of the National Immunization Plan (PNI)	Summoned with Habeas Corpus. Started the session as an investigated, but this status was reverted to witness
William Amorim Santana	July 9, 2021	Ministry of Health Staff	Summoned
Emanuela Medrades	July 13, 2021	Technical director of Precisa Medicamentos	Witness. She obtained a habeas corpus in the STF so she could remain silent in case of embarrassing questions
Emanuela Medrades	July 14, 2021	Technical director of Precisa Medicamentos	The interrogatory returned July 14 since she claimed fatigue and did not answer questions the day before.
Cristiano Alberto Carvalho	July 15, 2021	Attorney for Davati Medical Supply	Witness. He obtained a habeas corpus in the STF so he could remain silent in case of embarrassing questions

== Reaction of non-convoked involved parties ==
=== President Jair Bolsonaro ===
Quoted several times during the investigation, President Jair Bolsonaro was placed in complicated situations, as when he was quoted by the Miranda brothers (Luis Miranda and Luis Ricardo Miranda) during the investigation, they said that Bolsonaro was already aware of the corruption in the purchase of vaccines from Covaxin. This created a tension that justifies a criminal action against the president for prevarication, understanding that there was corruption but no action was taken.

The president has always been very open about all issues pertaining to his person, especially when talking to supporters in his "enclosure" in Brasilia, but after the denunciation of the Miranda brothers, Bolsonaro did not defend himself on the accusations, he just started to attack the CPI trying to discredit it by accusing members of the investigation of corruption without reliable evidence.

When provoked by the head of the CPI, Renan Calheiros, to present an answer about the accusations and forced by a letter sent by the senators, Bolsonaro had an invasive reaction and said the following: "I don't give a shit for the CPI. What good has it done for Brazil?" Then he added "I ignored you, there will be no answer". Bolsonaro is not legally obliged to respond to the senators, thus being an act that would only show disrespect and immorality.

The president can be summoned to testify at a CPI, but the bureaucratic process for this to occur is extremely complex. After the president's inelegant answers, it is possible that the senators will summon the president to testify. If summoned, Bolsonaro may be able to obtain in court the right to remain silent, but he will have to testify (even if he doesn't say anything) and he will not be able to lie during the investigation.

=== Armed Forces ===
The Armed Forces were also mentioned in some key moments of the investigation and with possible members in a list of future investigated such as Eduardo Pazuello who is an Army General, Élcio Franco who is an Army Reserve Colonel, Marcelo Blanco who is an Army Reserve Colonel, Bento Pires who is also a Colonel. And especially Roberto Dias, who is accused in a corruption scheme in the sale of overpriced vaccines.

After a major repercussion of military personnel involved in corruption schemes, the Armed Forces issued a note with an intimidating tone in which they promise a "tougher response" if the CPI continues to reveal corruption schemes within them. CPI president Omar Aziz, an ex-military man, reacted to the Armed Forces' note stating that he will not allow them to intimidate the work of the commission, saying the following: "It has been many years since Brazil has seen members of the rotten side of the Armed Forces involved in corruption within the government." After that, he added: "The note is very disproportionate. Make a thousand notes against me, but don't intimidate me. If you intimidate me, you intimidate this House here."

== History ==
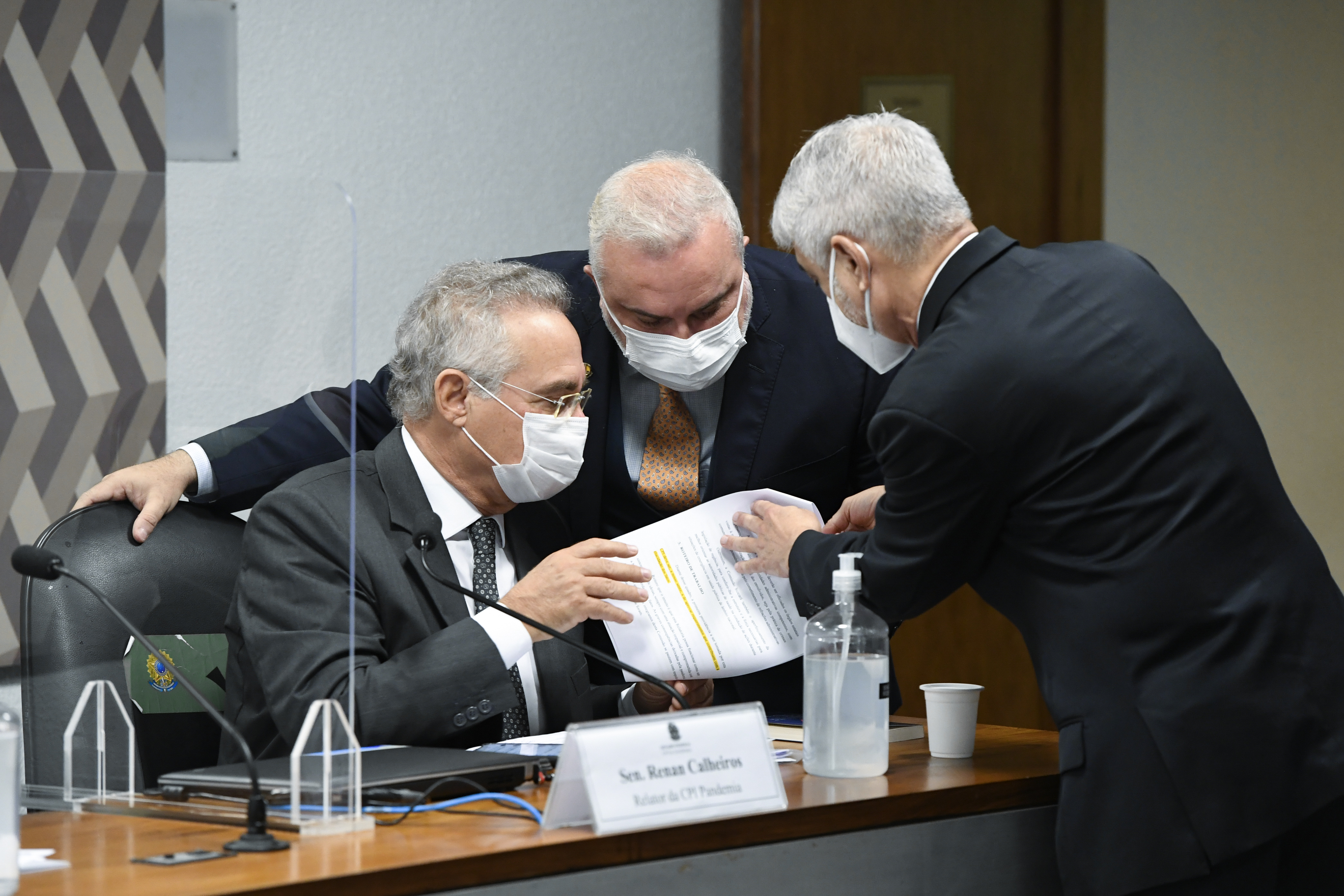
Senator Renan Calheiros (MDB-AL), repportaur from the CPI, talks and discusses documents with senators Jean Paul Prates (PT-RN) and Humberto Costa (PT-PE), May 4, 2021

=== Background ===
On April 19, 2021, federal deputy Carla Zambelli appealed to the Supreme Court to prevent cases of politicians with evidence of suspicion or impediment from being members of the CPI.

On April 26, 2021, the Casa Civil forwarded to the ministries a list with 23 accusations against the Federal Government. Minister Luiz Eduardo Ramos sent an e-mail to 13 ministries regarding 23 accusations and criticisms about the performance in fighting the COVID-19 pandemic in Brazil. In the list were accusations of early treatment, negligence of the government in buying vaccines, militarization of the Ministry of Health, minimization of the pandemic in Brazil, lack of adoption and restrictive measures to reduce the virus contagion. In response, the Civil House said that the document was created for the ministries to prepare responses.

=== Installation and First Week ===
At the beginning of the committee, the senators voted on the requirement of 115 requests for information directed to various bodies, companies, and state governments.

=== Second Week ===
The first to be heard by the CPI, on May 4, was Luiz Henrique Mandetta, the first health minister of the Jair Bolsonaro government. Mandetta delivered a letter to the CPI addressed to the president, in which he asked for the reconsideration of the position adopted by the government, "since the adoption of measures to the contrary could generate collapse of the health system and very serious consequences to the health of the population".

The Bolsonaro government's second health minister, Nelson Teich, was heard on Wednesday, May 5. During the six hours of his testimony, the former minister explained the reasons for his resignation, motivated by disagreements with government policy. Teich said that if the government continued with its actions in the ministry, Brazil would have more vaccines.

The next day, the fourth and current Minister of Health, Marcelo Queiroga, gave a statement that was considered evasive and ended up irritating the senators. Queiroga denied presidential pressure on technical issues, acknowledged the importance of vaccination and social distancing over "alternative treatments," and said he was unaware of "evidence of chemical warfare in China." The day before, President Bolsonaro had suggested that COVID-19 would have arisen in a chemical warfare action in China; later, the possibility would arise that the statement itself would be the subject of the CPI investigation. The senators consider the minister's answers insufficient, and planned to call him back.

The third Health Minister, General Eduardo Pazuello, was initially scheduled to appear before the CPI on the 5th, but was rescheduled for the 19th, after the former minister revealed that he has had recent contact with people who have contracted COVID-19. According to the vice-president of the commission, Senator Randolfe Rodrigues, Pazuello sought to avoid being heard as a witness by the CPI. On April 13, 2021, the Federal Attorney General's Office sent a letter to the STF so that the former minister can remain silent during testimony at the CPI and also ensure that he is immune from certain measures, such as imprisonment in case of non-compliance. Hours earlier, a lawyer requested habeas corpus for Pazuello from the STF to prevent him from being arrested in case of non-compliance. The minister chosen to judge both cases was Ricardo Lewandowski. A day later, Lewandowski granted habeas corpus allowing the former minister to remain silent and avoid prison.

=== Third week ===
On May 11, the testimony of the CEO Brazilian Health Regulatory Agency (Anvisa), Admiral Antonio Barra Torres, took place. In his statement, said that a series of statements by President Bolsonaro went against the recommendations of the agency. Barra Torres denied government pressure for the approval of chloroquine to combat COVID-19, but confirmed the existence of a proposal to change the drug's package insert at a meeting of ministers. Present at this meeting was physician Nise Yamaguchi, pointed out by Barra Torres as one of the heads of the supposed "Parallel Ministry of Health," a group independent of the administration of Minister Mandetta.

On May 12, 2021, it was the turn of former Secretary of the Special Secretariat of Social Communication (SECOM) Fábio Wajngarten to testify at the COVID-19 CPI. During the inquiry, Wajngarten denied that the federal government had made attacks on opponents through a parallel communications secretariat, popularly known as the hate cabinet; also denying that Councilman Carlos Bolsonaro (Republicans-RJ) had influence in the secretariat during his term. Finally, Wajngarten said that the Ministry of Health has not been "incompetent" in the vaccine procurement process, during an interview with Veja magazine.

However, the rapporteur of the CPI, Senator Renan Calheiros, considered Wajngarten's statements untrue and called for his arrest. Calheiros referred to a campaign with the title: O Brasil não pode parar ("Brazil can't stop"), broadcast in 2020 on the Federal Government's official website. Another lie he pointed out was during the Veja interview. The magazine itself released a 30-second audio of the interview. Senator Marcos Rogério rebuked him, saying that Renan Calheiros had abused his authority.

Minutes later, Senator Flávio Bolsonaro (Republicans-RJ) argued with Calheiros over the arrest request.

The president of the CPI Omar Aziz delivered to the Federal Public Ministry (MPF) the testimony of Wajngarten. The reason was the alleged lies in the questioning as a witness.

On May 13, 2021, it was the turn of Carlos Murillo, a representative of the Pfizer laboratory, to testify as a witness at the COVID-19 CPI. The executive confirmed that councilman Carlos Bolsonaro and special advisor to the presidency Filipe Martins were present at the meeting dealing with the purchase of 70 million doses. The information about her was passed on to Shirley Meschike during Murillo's testimony to the CPI.

He said he could not confirm the presence of the two in meetings he did not attend. He also said that the company only dealt with "authorities represented by the Government". CPI rapporteur Renan Calheiros threatened to summon two Pfizer representatives to clarify the situation. Two hours later, the general manager of the pharmaceutical company confirmed the presence of Carlos and Filipe.

Also in the interrogation, Murillo said that the Federal Government has not expressed itself about the offer of approximately 1.5 million doses still for 2020. He said that the laboratory presented 3 proposals of offers to the Government: of 30 or 70 million doses each shipment. The negotiations took place on August 14, 18, and 26, 2020. In a new negotiation, he also said that there were offers for the end of 2020 and all, at 70 million doses each. On November 11 and November 24, to be precise.

=== Fourth week ===
On May 18, 2021, it was former Foreign Minister Ernesto Araújo's turn to testify at the COVID-19 CPI. He denied that he made massive attacks on China. But the president of the CPI accused him of lying in the interrogation and asked that the country not punish Brazil with the delay in deliveries of active pharmaceutical ingredients (APIs) for vaccines. Senator Kátia Abreu (PP-TO) called the former chancellor a "compulsive denier". Araújo also reported in the CPI that the country's entry in the Covax Facility cost the Union R$2.5 billion (US$ 630,000,000) and that it was up to the Ministry of Health to adhere to the "minimum quantity of doses" in the consortium.

About Pfizer's vaccines, Araújo said that he knew of the laboratory's intention to sell them to Brazil in September 2020, where Nestor Forster (Brazil's ambassador to the United States) was the recipient of this supposed letter and had informed the former chancellor 2 days later. Also in the CPI, Araújo said he was unaware of the existence of a parallel cabinet in Health. Renan Calheiros then suggested that the philosopher and writer Olavo de Carvalho was a member of this group and asked him about it. Araújo limited himself to saying that he was a friend of his, but that did not mean the possibility of interference in the ministry.

On May 19, 2021, it was the turn of Eduardo Pazuello, former Minister of Health to testify at the COVID-19 CPI. In the first question asked by rapporteur Renan Calheiros, Pazuello recalled the Supreme Court's decision, which gave autonomy to the 3 executive powers (states, municipalities, and the Union being the latter to conduct measures to confront the pandemic) and said that the mandate "limited" the actions of the Federal Government and cited several numbers of transfers to states and municipalities for the Health Secretariats. Also in the interrogation, he said that the ministry adopted "total transparency" in the accounts and that the communication strategy was aimed at the most vulnerable.

Pazuello also said in his statement that he always had autonomy to make decisions in the post. He also said that his relationship with President Jair Bolsonaro has always been one of "simple friendship" without being close to the president, and that his nomination was made with official generals who work with the government.

About the purchases of CoronaVac vaccines, the general did not answer about the president's misdeeds for the purchase of 46 million doses. In the statement, Pazuello also said that Bolsonaro listened to other people not part of the ministry but denied that there was a parallel cabinet in Health. Renan Calheiros questioned the former minister about this "parallel counseling". The military said he would speak to put "a stone in this matter".

About the delay in acquiring the vaccines from Pfizer, Pazuello said he received contrary recommendations from the TCU, the AGU and the CGU about the purchase of the immunizer. The Federal Audit Court (TCU) refuted Pazuello's answers about Pfizer and informed in a note to the CPI that no such opinion was sent and that the purchase of the doses was urgent due to the health crisis caused by COVID-19. The former minister then corrected himself and referred to the Controladoria-Geral da União report; however, Eduardo Braga refuted this.

About the health crisis in Amazonas, Pazuello reported that in January he delivered oxygen. According to him, he was fully aware of the collapse on January 10 and would have delivered it six days before people died from the lack of oxygen. This statement angered the senators. Renan Calheiros claimed that the former minister "lied a lot" in the deposition arguing that he maneuvered to avoid answering the reported questions. Senator Eduardo Braga, on the other hand, harshly criticized Pazuello's statements about the collapse due to the lack of oxygen in Amazonas. He said that the deaths in the state occurred for several days at the beginning of the year and Manaus was the city most affected by the second wave. He also criticized the government's refusal of oxygen donations from Venezuela by not sending a Brazilian Air Force plane to the country.

On the second day of questioning, Pazuello finally said about the refusal to purchase the CoronaVac vaccine. He said that the president "never" spoke to him personally about purchasing the Chinese immunizer. According to him, the delay happened because of the lack of an interim measure that would make the purchase possible. The statement irritated the senators. Senator Zenaide Maia (PROS-RN) said that Pazuello assumed responsibility for the vaccines even though he had witnessed the intention to buy 46 million doses from CONASS. Otto Alencar, said that yesterday Pazuello had said that the president had oriented him to buy the material. But he didn't bought it, since at that moment he was subordinated to Jair Bolsonaro.

Pazuello wanted to preserve the president about his public statements opposing social distancing, mask wearing, and 70th IGPM alcohol. Alessandro Vieira asked the military man if he hadn't convinced the president to change his mind about such statements. The former minister then replied that "there is no scientific proof of the benefits of the use of the mask, alcohol 70°PMGI, and social distancing. He also said that such "really necessary" measures were preventive measures.

About the health collapse in Amazonas, Pazuello blamed the company White Martins and the municipal and state health secretariats for the chaos. According to him, the folder was "proactive" about the lack of oxygen. In a note released to the press, the state health secretariat of the state, said it was monitoring the demand for gas and in December 2020, and White Martins had not expressed itself about logistical difficulties to maintain the supply in hospitals. According to the G1 portal, on December 24, 2020, the company said in a note that it was monitoring the abnormal growth in demand for gas in Manaus and requested information from the state health department about the demand. Also in the note, the company said that the then Health Minister Eduardo Pazuello met with its executives and the state committee for a meeting on January 11, 2021.

Rapporteur Renan Calheiros said that he had "never seen a person lie so much in a CPI as Pazuello" and cited at least 15 allegedly false information.

=== Fifth week ===
On May 25, 2021, it was the turn of the Health Ministry's secretary of management and labor Mayra Pinheiro (commonly called "Captain Chloroquine") to testify at the COVID-19 CPI.

She defended the "early treatment" with drugs with no proven effectiveness against SARS-CoV-2 (chloroquine, azithromycin, ivermectin) in the interrogatory, however saying that she never determined the ministry to use the drugs and established "use of safe doses" prescribed by doctors. Renan Calheiros questioned her if the president of the Republic pressured her and she said no. About the health collapse in Amazonas, Mayra said that the health ministry "had no responsibility" for the chaos and blamed COVID-19.

About the "TrateCov" app, Pinheiro said that there was no hacking into the app but rather an "improper extraction of data." This statement contradicts Eduardo Pazuello, who said in a statement that the app "was stolen by a hacker." The platform was discontinued by the ministry on the grounds that she recommended "early treatment" of COVID, even though the person was not experiencing apparent symptoms. She further accused the press of accessing the app, "leaking" the alleged flaws, and disseminating content "out of context."

There was a comment made by the rapporteur Renan Calheiros, comparing the COVID-19 CPI to the Nuremberg Tribunal, which tried Nazi crimes. The statement angered senators from the ruling base. The rapporteur denied that he had offended the Jews with his comment and only "compared" two problem situations to the "denialism" in the pandemic. Soon after, Calheiros said that there are similarities between the behavior of Brazilian authorities in the middle of the commission and that of Marshal Hermann Göring, considered Adolf Hitler's number two. The Brazilian Israelite Confederation (Conib) repudiated Renan's speeches about the Holocaust.

Senator Randolfe Rodrigues released in the CPI an audio of Mayra harshly criticizing the work of Fiocruz on its policies saying that all the members were leftist.

The Senate Legislative Police opened an investigation against a columnist from the Folha de São Paulo newspaper about a report that had been published. Senators Luis Carlos Heinze and Eduardo Girão were the initiators of the investigation.

On May 27, 2021, it was the turn of Dimas Covas, president of the Butantan Foundation to testify at the COVID-19 CPI.

In the interrogation, he accused President Jair Bolsonaro for the delay in negotiating the CoronaVac vaccine. At the time, Bolsonaro stated in a press conference that the immunizer would not be purchased for "personal reasons". He also said that he had negotiated with Eduardo Pazuello the negotiation of the 46 million doses in a CONASS meeting. According to Covas, the institute offered 100 million doses in October 2020 but had not received any response from Ministry representatives. Renan Calheiros released a video with statements from the President of the Republic against the vaccine.

He also stated that Brazil could be the first country in the world to start the vaccination campaign, but that there were "mishaps" along the way. He also said that the call for volunteers was affected due to the "fake news" spread on social networks about CoronaVac.

About the possibility of a booster dose of CoronaVac due to its low efficacy, Dimas said he sees the need for a third dose to immunize the elderly and comorbid due to SARS-CoV-2 variants. He also explained that the 28-day period between 2 doses is "ideal" to complete the vaccine stage. There was discussion between Senator Marcos Rogério and the president of the CPI Omar Aziz. Rogério asked Dimas if João Doria's statements got in the way of China's negotiations for the purchase of vaccines. Soon after, an audio of the governor of SP was released.

=== Sixth week ===
On June 1, 2021, Nise Yamaguchi testified as an invited guest. She was pointed out as a member of a so-called "parallel cabinet in Health", which allegedly advised Bolsonaro to make decisions in the fight against the pandemic. Yamaguchi claimed to hold the view that it was not necessary to vaccinate the population randomly, as well as claiming that doctors who advocated early treatment, which included the use of chloroquine, were politically persecuted. She also denied that she proposed to change the chloroquine package insert to include its use in the treatment of COVID-19, contradicting the statements of Antônio Barra Torres and Mandetta. In a more tense moment of the session, one of Nise's staff was expelled from the CPI for "asking respect" for the doctor during the break, arguing with senators.

On June 2, 2021, Luana Araújo testified as an invited guest, in the position of infectious disease physician, indicated to assume the portfolio of the Ministry of Health's secretary of confrontation with COVID, but her nomination was not approved. About her harsh words in 2020 against the use of medicines from the "covid kit", she explained that in Medicine the evidence takes away from the individual responsibility of the professional a value judgment about the situation and that the so-called "early treatment" is "a delirious, oddball, anachronistic and counterproductive discussion". As for her non-appointment, the doctor said that she had received no explanation and that she went to Minister Queiroga's office and was told that there was no doubt about her technical capacity, but that she would have to withdraw the appointment, which had not been approved, without further explanation.

Senator Marcos do Val, alternate member of the commission, used his time to question that the senators treated the infectologist Luana well, in contrast to oncologist Nise Yamaguchi, who had been invited the day before. The senator also accused her of putting herself as the "owner of the truth", not having the right to undervalue the work of other doctors who defend early treatment. The infectious disease specialist replied that she was not the "owner of the truth", but representing a class of scientists and entities. Other senators supporting the president did not agree with the doctor's scientific statements. Senator Marcos Rogério used the doctor's speech against the so-called "early treatment" to say that she was against going to the doctor. Luana explained that early diagnosis is different from early treatment, and clarified that prophylaxis is to prevent a person from getting sick or to reduce the risk of getting sick, and that in terms of the COVID-19 pandemic, it refers to vaccine intervention, associated with other non-pharmacological strategies, such as mask use and social distancing.

=== Seventh week ===
On June 8, Minister Queiroga testified for the second time. He took an assertive position on the defense of non-pharmacological measures, vaccine use, and the lack of scientific evidence for early treatment. The minister's scientific position displeased pro-Bolsonaro senators. Queiroga was asked by the reporter if he advises the president to wear a mask. The minister replied that the guidelines are for everyone, and complemented by stating that he is the minister of health and not "the president's censor". As for the withdrawal of the nomination of infectious disease specialist Luana Pinheiro, the minister presented a different version from the one put forward by the doctor the week before. He affirmed that the non-appointment was his exclusive decision due to the non-harmonization of the scientific thoughts defended by her with those of the medical class. He complemented that Luana's name had been approved by the Civil House, in contradiction with what Luana reported. About the purchase of vaccines, Queiroga until then had not accepted the purchase of 30 million doses of CoronaVac produced by the Butantan Institute, but said that he had personally talked to Dimas Covas, director of the institute, about the purchase of the vaccine.

On June 9, former secretary Élcio Franco testified as a witness. The testimony began an hour late, due to a short deliberative section for approving testimony and requests, in which Senator Jorginho Mello asked that the violation of telephone and telecom secrecy be voted on the following day. President Omar Aziz granted the request. Colonel Élcio denied knowledge of the so-called "shadow cabinet", but claimed to know and have met with some members such as Nise Yamaguchi, Arthur Weintraub, Osmar Terra, and Carlos Wizard. The colonel was questioned mainly about the purchase of vaccines. When asked by rapporteur Renan Calheiros, Élcio gave as explanations for the delay in buying vaccines, the uncertainty in the effectiveness of vaccines and the lack of legislation to buy vaccines not approved by Anvisa. Coronel called phase three of vaccine development a "vaccine graveyard," which provoked criticism for other vaccines (e.g. Covaxin.) have been purchased even before entering phase three. Senator Eduardo Braga harshly criticized this delay. As for the thesis of letting the virus spread freely through the population, Élcio said that the idea of herd immunity had never been discussed in the technical area, and that the severity of the pandemic was known, and there should be annual vaccination campaigns.

About the purchase of vaccines from Pfizer, Élcio Franco explained the contract clauses were one of the reasons for the delay of the purchase of vaccines that even required a law that guaranteed the purchase of vaccines. Of these clauses, he highlighted the non-liability for adverse effects of the vaccine and the mandatory signature of the president. The colonel himself went public to declare that the government would not sign these so-called "unfair" clauses, and was asked by Senator Eliziane Gama if this attitude did not hinder the negotiation with Pfizer; Élcio replied that his speech is part of a government pressure against the company and that it was a business strategy of the negotiation. As for the lost opportunities to buy the Pfizer vaccine earlier and cheaper, Senator Randolfe Rodríguez questioned why only the president's signature was removed from a draft of a provisional measure that would allow the purchase of the Pfizer vaccine. Élcio confessed that the lack of consensus came from the Ministry of Economy.

On June 10, the governor of Amazonas Wilson Lima was summoned as a witness and appealed to the Supreme Federal Court for a writ of habeas corpus not to appear, because he was being investigated by the Federal Police. The day was taken up by a deliberative section for voting on requests. However, the session was tumultuous due to the STF decision, suspending the deposition of Wilson Lima, and the request for breaches of secrecy. Initially, Senator Marcos Rogério interrupted the session for more than twenty minutes on the complaint that the STF's interference was unconstitutional and that everyone should be investigated. On the other hand, regarding the telephone secrecy requests, the senator was against it and asked for a question of order to withdraw the requests alleging lack of motivation and invalidity of this request. Senator and law professor Fabiano Contarato explained the validity of the request. The senator and president of the commission Omar Aziz dismissed the question and explained that the requests would be properly grounded.

On June 11, microbiologist and researcher Natalia Pasternak and the sanitary doctor and former president of Anvisa, Cláudio Maierovitch, were heard. In her opening speech, Natalia used her time to explain the importance of science and the difference between laboratory studies and observational studies, focusing on the lack of solid evidence for the use of early treatment, showing studies dating back to the mid-2020s. Maierovitch showed research proving that Brazil was one of the most prepared countries for possible epidemics, and contrasted this with another study that showed Brazil as the worst country in fighting the pandemic. Senator Renan Calheiros criticized the presidential speeches on June 9 and 10 about the non-effectiveness of the vaccine and the non-use of masks. In response to Senator Randolfe Rodrigues, the researcher and the doctor stated that it was not the time to stop using masks and make isolation measures more flexible. Natalia explained that this kind of measure should be based on the number of cases of COVID and not on the number of vaccinated people.

In response to Senator Renan Calheiros about treatments, the sanitary doctor recalled the approval of the law for the use of phosphoethanolamine to fight cancer by the then federal deputy Jair Bolsonaro in 2016. Natalia complemented that on this occasion it cost R$10 million for the state of São Paulo, and that the measure was approved by popular clamor and not by scientific motivation. Later it was shown that this chemical compound was not effective against cancer, and the law was judged unconstitutional by the STF in 2020. Criticizing the "COVID kit", Maierovitch warned about the danger of irresponsible use of antibiotics, such as azithromycin, which could lead to antibiotic resistance by bacteria.

=== Eighth week ===
On June 15, the former health secretary of Amazonas was heard. The civil engineer Marcellus Campelo adopted a calm speech and did not point out errors in his management, "We did what we could with available funds". The former secretary had been asked about the oxygen shortage crisis in the state, about the trip of the entourage of doctor Mayra Pinheiro and on measures to contain the pandemic. About the imminent lack of oxygen supply in the state, both opposition and ruling senators criticized the state's inaction. Senator Eduardo Braga showed correspondence from White Martins dated the beginning of September 2020 about the company is already operating at full capacity and that it would be necessary to hire additional sources of oxygen supply; the crisis will only occur after five months. The former secretary admitted that no plant for oxygen production was purchased by the state. In response to Renan, the former secretary said that there was only a lack of oxygen in the state hospitals on January 14 and 15, 2021. At the same moment senator Eduardo Braga claimed that the former secretary was lying, just like the former health minister Pazuello and Élcio Franco lied. According to the videos shown by the senator, the oxygen crisis at least lasted until January 26, 2021.

As for the restriction measures, there was a growing number of cases in the state, and the secretary was alerted in September by the Health Surveillance Foundation. The secretary admitted that the planning considered that the worst-case scenario was a repeat of the crisis of the first wave and that "only at the end of December that we started to notice that there was something different in the contamination", not knowing possible variants of the virus. Senator Otto Alencar criticized that the health portfolio had been given to a civil engineer. The former secretary said that he had a 5-phase pandemic contingency plan that was activated when "the Covid-19 ICU occupancy rate exceeded 75% of its capacity". On December 23, 2020, phase 3 of the plan was activated, and the crisis committee prepared a decree that restricted activities and the circulation of people in the state. In the following days, the decree was revoked, relaxing the sanitary measures, and the demonstrations of the population against the decree was the reason exposed by the former secretary. In the words of the engineer, "there were many demonstrations [...] that forced the government to relax the decree". This position had been harshly criticized by Senator Alessandro, explaining that the one who revokes the decree is the state governor, not the population.

The June 16th session began with voting on requests. The session lasted one hour and six minutes and removed secrecy from part of the documents sent to the commission as "secret" in order to correct documents that were incorrectly sent with this secrecy. This request displeased Senators Marcos Rogério (DEM-RO) and Ciro Nogueira (PP-PI). Three information requests were approved, plus five requests for the lifting of telephone and bank secrecy (one of them belonging to Carlos Wizard). Three more summonses were also approved and one rejected. Protected by habeas corpus, the former governor of the state of Rio de Janeiro was heard as a guest and could not answer questions and could leave the session at any time. Former federal judge Wilson Witzel revealed alleged retaliations of the federal government to the states during the pandemic. He explained that the distancing of the state and federal government took place from 2018, in this situation the former governor called for an impartial investigation into the death of councilwoman Marielle Franco; "From the Marielle case, I particularly realized that the federal government began to retaliate against me. After this event, I was no longer received at the Palácio do Planalto. I had difficulty talking to ministers," said Witzel.

The former governor was impeached in April 2020 and among other charges were allegations of corruption involving kickbacks paid by Social Organizations (OSs) in the health area. Witzel claims to have been the target of a larger action that wanted to remove him from power, and as evidence show that process. As for the campaign hospitals, Witzel said these were targets of persecution by RJ deputies and lack of support by the federal government. "Unfortunately, the campaign hospitals were sabotaged from beginning to end with reports stimulated by these deputies, who were doing cartwheels in RJ against social isolation." He also said that perhaps the field hospitals would not be necessary had he opened the more than 800 beds closed in federal hospitals in the state; Witzel again blamed the federal government "The federal hospitals are untouchable. If the CPI breaks the secrets of the OSs that manage the hospitals, it will find out who owns the hospitals." As for the social restriction measures, he said that there was no communication with the ministry of health, stating that "Since there was no coordination from the federal government, the issue was solved by the Supreme Court (STF). And it must be made very clear: the STF did not prevent the federal government from doing anything, but gave governors and mayors the necessary conditions for us to overcome the omission of the federal government." He affirmed that he was one of the first governors to implement social isolation measures and criticized the delay in the coming of the emergency aid and concluded: "If you ask the population to stay at home, but don't give them conditions, it is more difficult to control the pandemic".

There was uproar throughout the session. Senator Flávio (Patriota-RJ), not a member of the CPI, said that the former governor "was elected by lying, deceiving the people of Rio and revealed himself after he sat in the governor's chair. After the aggressive speeches by senators Jorginho Mello (PL-SC) and Eduardo Girão (Podemos-CE), the former governor decided to close the session. However, during the session a request was made to hold a session under the secrecy of the court to provide hard evidence of the federal government's actions against the governor.

At the June 17 session, businessman Carlos Wizard and former TCU auditor Alexandre Marques were questioned as witnesses. The session was suspended because the businessman did not appear to testify. As a witness Wizard has the obligation to present himself, so Omar Aziz, the president of the CPI asked the STF for the coercive conduction of the businessman and the retention of his passport. On this occasion Aziz commented on the lack of respect with the STF for the businessman having requested a habeas corpus to be able to testify in silence, "What amazes me is a citizen seeking the STF to get a habeas corpus to come to this CPI to be silent and he does not appear. So why did he go to the Supreme if he wasn't coming?" said Aziz. As for the former auditor, his testimony will be scheduled for a later date. In the case of both witnesses, on the previous day, June 16, telephone and telematic seizures were approved. Wizard's defense appealed against the lifting of the secrecy.

In the June 18 section, two doctors who advocate so-called "early treatment" for COVID were invited. On this occasion, members of the opposition and the CPI rapporteur chose not to participate in the hearing. Senator Marcos Rogerio, interrupted the speech of Senator Jorginho Melo with a question of order to vote some senator to ask questions in place of the rapporteur of the CPI, in response the president of the CPI Omar Aziz said that the doctors are not in conditions of witnesses or investigated and that the rapporteur has no obligation to ask questions. In response to Senator Girão, the doctors confirmed their participation in the portfolio commanded by Arthur Weintrab at the OAS, and both denied having a political conflict of interest. As for the "treatment", both doctors defend the use of more than 20 drugs that go beyond chloroquine. As for the media characterizing the debate as unscientific, both doctors downplayed Dr. Luana Araújo's participation in the CPI, and Alves said she was not suitable for the position in the Ministry of Health. They also criticized researcher Pasternak for disseminating science and not having seen patients with COVID.

Physician Ricardo Ariel Zimerman criticized the horizontal lockdown, and said that this media is the opposite of social distancing. This doctor used the example of the state of Amazonas, said that the average number of people per household is 7 or 8 people, and therefore staying at home is an agglomeration and stimulates the development of virus variants such as the variant $\gamma$ (gamma or P1) variant originating in Manaus. In response to Jorginho, the doctor rectified what he said in the video that the use of chloroquine reduces mortality by 21% and stated that it reduces mortality by 73%. Zimerman explained the concept of cherry-picking and confirmation bias to explain why some people only read articles that confirm what they think. Physician Zimmerman warned about the lethal dose of chloroquine being low.

Doctor Francisco Eduardo Cardoso Alves said that continuing with lockdown is "insisting on the error", and used the UK as an example for having an increase in the number of cases even with lockdown. With this, Alves concluded that lockdown is "proven not to work". Alves said that the vaccines are still new and warned of the risk that they may not be effective against new variants. Alves said that "early treatment" should just be called "treatment" and that this has had "thousands of lives saved." On this subject, he said he doesn't care that he has been the target of "attacks" by doctors and scientists because he "knows he is right, (...) and it is not the mockery of a fellow denialist that will make me turn back". On several occasions Alves criticized the study in Manaus, saying that it was unethical and that the dose of chloroquine was lethal. The doctor also said that it is "fake news" that Ivermectin causes liver cirrhosis or hepatitis, saying that only in Brazil there is this suspicion. Alves defended that in the case of a pandemic situation the best available evidence at the time and pharmacological plausibility should be used. Alves said that the post-COVID syndrome is less frequent for people who adopted the "early treatment". In response to Omar Aziz, doctor Alves vehemently attacked the deliberate use of the so-called "COVID kit," and argued that treatment should be individualized.

Both doctors criticized the prescription of "early treatment" outside the hospital and/or prior to contamination. They also criticized herd immunization, and Zimerman encouraged immunization with vaccination.

=== Ninth week ===
Over the weekend of June 19 and 20, Brazil passed the COVID-19 mark of 500,000 deaths. In respect, the CPI senators held a minute of silence. Senators Randolfe Rodrigues, Eliziane Gama, Humberto Costa, Rogerio Carvalho, and Otto Alencar held up mourning signs written "500 thousand lives", "responsibility", and "vaccine".

On Tuesday, June 22, congressman Osmar Terra was invited. The congressman was invited because of his presence in the supposed "parallel cabinet" and because of his public positions minimizing the pandemic. Osmar denies the existence of the cabinet, saying that there was only one meeting with other doctors to which he was invited. He denied that he has put forward a proposal to "contaminate the population freely," however, he went on to state that quarantine and lockdown measures have no effect in fighting the pandemic. As for the erroneous predictions that in 2020 he had claimed that there would be no more than 800 deaths and no variants of the virus, the deputy said "The predictions I made were based not on an apocalyptic mathematical study like the one at Imperial College."

On the 23rd Francisco Emerson Maximiano did not attend the CPI for health reasons.

On the 24th Jurema Werneck and Pedro Hallal were invited to the CPI. A graph presented by Pedro shows that those most affected by the pandemic are black and, proportionally, indigenous peoples. In the year 2020 he was leading an EPICOVID research study, which was cancelled after these results were presented. The study was not replaced by another in 2020. The epidemiologist showed that 400,000 deaths could be avoided with a "median performance" in fighting the pandemic. Of those, about 95,500 people could have been immunized if the purchase of the Coronavac and Pfizer vaccines had not been delayed.

On Friday the 25th, brothers Luiz Miranda (DEM-DF) and Luis Ricardo Miranda were heard. The contract for the purchase of the Indian vaccine Covaxin was on the agenda. During his testimony, Ricardo Miranda refuted Onyx Lorenzoni's accusations. After suspecting the purchase, the deputy and the server claim that they would have met with President Bolsonaro.

=== Tenth week ===
On June 29, the CPI heard from Fausto Junior, a state deputy in Amazonas and rapporteur of the CPI that investigated crimes in health care in the state. The deputy was questioned about the non-indictment and non-invocation of Governor Wilson Lima by the CPI. Among the reasons given by the deputy, he said that it was not allowed to investigate the governor and that the investigation was already being conducted by the police. The explanation did not convince the senators and senator Soraya Thronicke (PSL-MS) confronted him saying that the responsibility to investigate the governors is of the state chamber. Senator Omar Aziz affirmed that the non-indictment of the governor of Amazonas was due to Junior's personal interests; "I will point out the reason why the congressman did not indict the governor of Amazonas, and the reason is very big", said Aziz.

On June 30 Wizard was summoned as a witness. In possession of a Habeas Corpus, the billionaire businessman decided to remain silent. The day was marked by biblical quotes by some senators. Eliziane Gama contrasted the posture of the businessman, e.g. buying vaccines for the private initiative, with the trajectory of Christ; "Jesus was on the side of the poor, orphans, widows, and the excluded," said the senator. During the day the senators showed several videos of the businessman, among which the video of Wizard laughing at five dead people in Porto Feliz was the most shown.

Once again, Francisco Emerson Maximiano did not show up at the CPI, because his testimony that was scheduled for July 1 was postponed and in his place was called Luiz Paulo Dominghetti Pereira due to a denunciation that he had made to the newspaper Folha de São Paulo about a request for a bribe of US$1(one) per dose in the purchase of 400 million doses of Astrazeneca's vaccine.

On July 1, Minas Gerais military police corporal and businessman Luiz Paulo Dominghetti Pereira testified. He represented the Davati company in the vaccine negotiations with the Ministry of Health. He explained the request for the bribe was made by Roberto Ferreira Dias, Colonel Blanco and Élcio Franco. Roberto Dias was the then director of Logistics at the Ministry of Health; Deputy Natália Bonavides (PT-RN) forwarded to the STF a request for investigation of crimes of criminal association, passive corruption and administrative advocacy on the part of Dias. In the face of this scandal, Dias was exonerated. The alleged request for a bribe occurred in a restaurant in a shopping mall in Brasília, where 400 million doses of AstraZeneca were being negotiated. At the time, February 25, 2021, the market price was $3.50 per dose and Dias asked for $1.00 bribe per dose. Dominghetti could not explain how Davati would have been able to deliver the amount of vaccines and pointed the responsibility to Herman, owner of the company. Dominghetti revealed that Reverend Amilton Gomes de Paula was his contact with the health ministry. On February 22, 2021, the reverend met with Dominghetti and the air force officer Hardaleson Araújo de Oliveira. During his testimony, Dominghetti reported that parliamentarians sought the CEO of Davati in Brazil, Cristiano Alberto Carvalho, to broker the purchase of vaccines, the deponent even reproduced an audio of deputy Luis Miranda the same who testified to the CPI a week earlier, the audio would be about the negotiation of some product with Cristiano, Dominghetti could not say whether the negotiations were about vaccines or not, The rapporteur Renan Calheiros asked for the seizure of the cell phone of the seller for investigation, Luis Miranda even gave a press conference and talked with the chairman of the commission Omar Aziz along with Senators Bezerra and Marcos do Val, outside the CPI and said that the audio was tampered with, because it was about negotiations made in 2020 about buying gloves, after the verification of the tampering Dominghetti says he did not know he was editing the audio that Cristiano Carvalho sent him.

=== Eleventh week ===
On July 6, contract inspector Regina Célia of the Ministry of Health testified. She was nominated for the position by Ricardo Barros, but denied knowing him. During the deposition she was questioned for approving the contract for the Indian Covaxin vaccine. In response, the inspector said that she "didn't find anything atypical". As for the invoice counting with the name of a third company, Madison Biotech, from Singapore, to receive the money, the fiscal attributed the responsibility to the import sector for not having pointed out this error.

On July 7, the former director of Logistics at the Ministry of Health, Roberto Dias, was heard. In his statement, Dias revealed that he did not negotiate vaccines, and that the responsibility was that of the executive secretary Élcio Franco. As for the meeting with Dominghetti in which vaccines were negotiated, Dias denied having invited him. President Omar Aziz requested the arrest of the deponent for false testimony, claiming that he had enough evidence to show that the meeting with Dominghetti was planned. The next day, Roberto Dias was released after paying a bail of R$1.100,00 (US$ 280).

On July 8 the former coordinator of the national immunization plan (NIP) Francieli Fantinato testified as an investigated. During her testimony, the rapporteur changed her status from investigated to witness. The servant explained that the immunization plan "cannot make a successful campaign without vaccines and without communication, without an effective publicity campaign". Senator Alessandro Vieira questioned what other reasons made her resign from her position, Francieli reported that the pressure from several municipalities to change the order of the priority groups "brought a difficulty to the campaign". The former coordinator revealed that Colonel Élcio Franco's executive secretary denied the inclusion of the deprived-of-freedom population in the PNI; the then PNI coordinator reported that "If it is taken away, it will leave without the program's official endorsement" and "Who asked to take away the deprivation-of-freedom group was Colonel Élcio". As for the purchase of vaccines, the first request from PNI was on June 19, 2020, reporting that it did not limit the supplier of the vaccine only requested "satisfactory results and approval by Anvisa". However, he added that the negotiation took place in Élcio's executive office. As for the government having adhered to the minimum quantity of 10% in the Covax consortium, the PNI coordinator reported having requested a larger quantity of vaccines than agreed; she said "we needed to vaccinate within the scenarios or 55% of the population up to 95%, in a scenario of uncertainty". At the time, Franciele questioned the executive secretary and Élcio Franco replied that "we can't put all our eggs in one basket".

On July 9, the CPI heard William Santana, technical consultant for the Ministry of Health's import sector. Earlier in the CPI, Regina Célia pointed out that it was William who pointed out the discrepancies between the invoice and the Covaxin contract. William confirmed that he saw errors in the invoices and asked for their correction.

=== Twelfth week ===
On July 13, 2021, the representative of Precisa Medicamentos Emanuela Medrades appeared before the COVID-19 CPI, but she remained silent throughout the session, claiming that she herself had already made statements to the Federal Police. The president of the CPI Omar Aziz suspended the hearing temporarily and the president of the STF Luiz Fux said that the deponent can only remain silent for questions that might embarrass her.

In the evening of the same day, the session was resumed and again Emanuela did not answer the senators' questions. The president of the CPI then rescheduled her return to the commission for July 14. She claimed exhaustion and tiredness.

On the 14th, Emanuela denied that the contract with Bharat Biotech started to be inspected late and reported that only the first dates were met; however, she contradicted herself. Regina Célia, already questioned in the commission, said that she only brokered the inspection of the COVAXIN contract on March 22. Medrades, on the other hand, said that she had followed up much earlier, on March 3.

In the session, Medrades denied that Precisa offered the value of US$10 per dose of vaccines, and that the Ministry of Health opted to pay US$15 instead. In the contract signed by the government, the 20 million doses were not delivered, nothing was paid, and the contract was temporarily suspended. She also said that the first invoice of the COVAXIN vaccine was shipped with payment in advance, as it was a standard that the manufacturer Bharat practiced worldwide. The vaccine was the most expensive vaccine contracted by the government so far. About the negotiations of the vaccine, Emanuela said she dealt with Élcio Franco "most of the negotiations". Still in the interrogation she said that the delivery of the document was made on March 22, whose information contradicts the speech of the Miranda brothers and William Amorim, who informed the date to be on March 18, and Onyx Lorenzoni, who informed to be on the 19th. She suggested a confrontation.

On July 15, Cristiano Carvalho, representative of Davati Medical Supply, testified at the COVID-19 CPI as a witness. He said that the "vaccine salesman", police officer Luiz Paulo Dominghetti, had approached him in January of this year to discuss the issue. He also said that he didn't know Dominghetti until then. This version contradicts the police officer's version, who claimed in the CPI that Cristiano had approached him first.

Cristiano denied an alleged bribe payment to Davati for the purchase of the vaccines. He had said that "it was an opportunity for the vaccine issue" and, induced by Dominghetti, "he embarked on that journey". He also said that Colonel Blanco negotiated the purchase of 400 million doses from Oxford/AstraZeneca through a "commission".

Also during the hearing, Carvalho said that at least 8 people mediated the negotiation of the vaccines. In the list disclosed to the CPI, 6 are military. He also reported the meeting of the Ministry of Health intermediated by Reverend Amilton Gomes de Paula (owner of the Secretariat of Humanitarian Affairs) and Colonel Hélcio Bruno (of the Força Brasil Institute) The companies listed are private and these people do not hold public positions.

== See also ==
- COVID-19 misinformation
- COVID-19 vaccination in Brazil
- COVID-19 Proxalutamide trial in Brazil
- Covaxgate
