= Jorge Kajuru =

Brazilian politician (born 1961)

Senator for Goiás
- Incumbent
- Assumed office 1 February 2019

Member of the Municipal Chamber of Goiânia
- In office 1 January 2017 – 1 February 2019
- Constituency: At-large

Personal details
- Born: Jorge Kajuru Reis da Costa Nasser; 20 January 1961 (age 65) Cajuru, São Paulo, Brazil
- Party: PSB (2023–present; 2019)
- Other political affiliations: PPS (2011–13); PSOL (2013); PRP (2013–19); Patriota (2019); Cidadania (2019–21); PODE (2021–23)
- Occupation: Sports journalist, Broadcaster, Television presenter and Politician

Jorge Kajuru Reis da Costa Nasser, better known as Jorge Kajuru (born January 20, 1961) is a sports journalist, broadcaster, television presenter, businessman and Brazilian politician affiliated with the Brazilian Socialist Party (PSB), being a senator for the state of Goiás. Between 2017 and 2019, he was a councilor of Goiânia, being the most voted in the city in the 2016 election.

== Career ==
When he was still living in Goiânia, Kajuru was the owner of Rádio K (Rádio Clube de Goiás). The radio was temporarily taken off the air on several occasions during the mandate of Governor Marconi Perillo, of the PSDB. In 2002, the TRE of Goiás determined, in response to the governor's representation, to close the radio station for eight days due to repeated non-compliance with the electoral law.

In the early 2000s, he was in charge of sports programs on RedeTV!, from where he resigned in 2002. The following year, after a frustrated negotiation with Globo, he closed with Band to present Esporte Total. On June 2, 2004, in a live entry from one of the access gates to the Mineirão Stadium, Kajuru criticized the Government of Minas Gerais and the then governor Aécio Neves after presenting complaints about tickets intended for wheelchair users for the match between Brazil and Argentina that were being passed on to politicians and artists. After calling the break, Kajuru was fired from the station. The channel mentioned a technical issue, but when they returned to the game's broadcast, Kajuru was no longer on screen. He mentioned in several interviews that Aécio's complaints were the decisive factor in his being fired.

In April 2005, the program Fora do Ar premiered, a talk show on SBT with Adriane Galisteu, Cacá Rosset and Hebe Camargo. The program went off the air in September of the same year.

On December 1, 2008, he launched TVKajuru, a web TV on the Internet, with sports, news and good humor on the Internet. TV Kajuru is located in Ribeirão Preto.

In 2010, the program Kajuru na Área stopped being shown in the region of Campinas (where it aired on TVB), and in the state of Paraná (where it aired on Rede Massa), so the program continues to be shown only for the regions of Ribeirão Preto and Jaú.

On January 25, 2010, Jorge Kajuru starts working at TV Esporte Interativo, first presenting Kajuru Sob Controle, alongside Melissa Garcia. In an interview with the program Jogando em Casa, he admitted that for the 1st time in his career he asked for a job. Even though he is on TV Esporte Interativo, Kajuru does not stop showing the program Kajuru na Área, which continues to be recorded from Monday to Friday for the regions of Ribeirão Preto and Jaú. In June of the same year, he was interviewed by the journalist Roberto Cabrini in the SBT Conexão Repórter, where he announced the end of his career and that it would be his last interview granted.

On January 10, 2011, the program Kajuru Sob Controle reaches its second season. In one of the shows, Kajuru "marries" her show partner Melissa Garcia, and is entitled to an air kiss. In July of the same year, Melissa would be replaced by Kelly Dias. During the year, Kajuru was invited to participate in the programs Adnet Ao Vivo, commanded by Marcelo Adnet on MTV Brasil, Pânico na TV, where he presented "Jô Suado" and Hebe, by Hebe Camargo, on Rede TV!.

In 2013, Jorge Kajuru revealed to the Esporte Interativo channel on the internet that Marcella, the second daughter of player Túlio Maravilha, is actually the result of an extra-marital affair between Kajuru and Alessandra, the former striker's wife.

Until June 2014, he hosted the show O Incrível Kajuru and the talk show Kajuru Pergunta. The following month, Kajuru was fired from TV Esporte Interativo, claiming to have been demanded by José Maria Marin, from CBF and Carlos Nuzman from COB. He said he still didn't get paid for the blog for a year. According to Kajuru, the dismissal would also have been requested by the agency that takes care of broadcasting Sadia's advertising. When referring to the issues, Kajuru called the two leaders thieves, in the outburst given on social networks, in which he also accused Esporte Interativo of deadbeat.

== Political career ==
In 2011, Jorge Kajuru joined the PPS, and according to the party, he would run for councilor in the 2012 elections which, according to Kajuru, is not true, claiming he was not prepared and did not have time available due to of work as a journalist. In 2013, he returned to politics at the request of Senator Romário for the PSB. Kajuru had a brief stint with the PSOL and in 2013 he left the party to join the PRP.

At the end of June 2014, Kajuru announced his candidacy for the position of Federal Deputy for the state of Goiás. In the elections, Kajuru obtained more than 106 thousand votes, being one of the 10 most voted deputy candidates in the state. Even with the expressive vote, he was not elected.

In the elections of October 2, 2016, Jorge Kajuru ran for the position of councilor of Goiânia for the PRP in coalition with the Democrats to strengthen the base of councilors on the side of governor Iris Rezende. After counting all the polls, Kajuru was elected with 37,796 votes (5.65% of the total), being the most voted councilor in the city.

In 2018, Kajuru ran for the Senate for Goiás, for the "A Change is Now" coalition, led by Ronaldo Caiado (DEM) and Lincoln Tejota (PROS). He was elected to the second seat with 1,557,415 votes, which represents 28.23% of the valid votes.

In January 2019, Kajuru leaves the PRP after the acronym announces a merger with Patriota and joins the PSB, where he was in 2013. In July of the same year, the senator announced his departure in common agreement from the legend after voting in favor of the decree. of arms of President Jair Bolsonaro, of which the PSB takes a contrary position. On social media, Kajuru stated that his heart wanted him to see "a senator without a party, so that he could vote according to whoever elected me a senator of Brazil", also declaring that if he were to return to any party, it would be for the PSB itself.

In August of the same year, Kajuru announces his affiliation to the Patriota as he is aligned with the flexibilization of the carrying and possession of weapons.

In September, Kajuru announced his affiliation with Cidadania, thus returning to his first party (former PPS). The senator stated that he was in doubt between joining the PODE or Cidadania, having asked his friend José Luiz Datena for advice, who advised him to choose the latter.

In April 2021, the senator exchanged Citizenship for Podemos, after a controversy with President Bolsonaro.

== Dossiê K ==
Dossiê K was a book written by Jorge Kajuru with allegations of corruption in the Government of the State of Goiás, in the administration of the then governor and candidate for reelection Marconi Perillo. On September 28, 2002, the printing and distribution of the book were prohibited by the TRE de Goiás until the end of the 2002 election period. The Military Police of Goiás carried out a search and seizure warrant on Campus 2 of the Federal University of Goiás to collect copies of the book that were being distributed free of charge. The action caused controversy and official repudiation notes on the part of the university's management, as it was considered truculent and because the Federal University was a territory under the jurisdiction of the Federal Police. Kajuru was prosecuted by the then governor.

== Controversies ==
Kajuru, due to his critical impetus, made many denunciations of corruption and mismanagement by governments. He is known for making controversial statements and opposing merchandising on news programs. In an interview with The Noite in 2014, Kajuru claimed to have 132 cases, a national record.

In June 2010, in an interview with the program Conexão Repórter, on SBT, he stated that the Brazilian team would miss the World Cup that year because, according to him, everything would be bought for Brazil to win the 2014 World Cup. interview on the same program in June 2014, and also on Esporte Interativo. However, in the 2014 World Cup semi-finals, Brazil lost to the German national team by a score of 7–1, and Germany became champions, winning their fourth world title.

He was fired (and resigned) from several places he worked; he resigned on air when he worked at RedeTV!.

=== Disagreements with Boris Casoy ===
In his program on SBT Kajuru na Área in 2009, Kajuru criticized journalist Boris Casoy for an offensive comment made by the journalist in the same year to street sweepers in Jornal da Band of Rede Bandeirantes. To counter the criticism, in 2013 Boris posted a video on YouTube saying that Kajuru had received money from the bicheiro Carlinhos Cachoeira, when he was accused by Blog do Paulinho (who is Kajuru's enemy) of receiving money and sponsorship from bicheiro company between 2010 and 2011.

“This kid called Kajuru, I don't know what a strange name that is… This kid has no right to criticize anyone… before explaining to the population, before explaining to his viewers, why he would call the bicheiro Cachoeira asking for money… money? What favors did he do Cachoeira to call and ask for money? There, so are the recordings of him asking for money, insistently, for the bicheiro Cachoeira ... Good thing, isn't it... ”

— Boris Casoy

Days later, in response to Boris Casoy, Kajuru posted another video on YouTube calling Boris a fascist and a pedophile.

“You get on YouTube and call me the poor guy, you're not offending me, Boris. I'd rather be a poor guy than be rich, elitist, racist, fascist and pedophile like you, because that's a crime. ”

— Jorge Kajuru

By accusing with offensive terms, Boris Casoy filed a lawsuit against Kajuru for moral damages.

== Judicial arrest and convictions ==
In March 2005, Jorge Kajuru was sentenced to eighteen months in prison for defamation of the company Jaime Câmara Junior (OJC) and against the company's president, Jaime Câmara Junior, during a broadcast on Rádio K do Brasil on January 24, 2001. It was Kajuru's first definitive conviction.

In May 2005, he was ordered to pay 100 minimum wages (30,000 reais) as compensation for moral damages to the governor of Goiás, Marconi Perillo. A definitive conviction weighed against him in a lawsuit brought by Marconi, where he had to serve a sentence of 1 year and 6 months in an open regime for a crime against honor.

Kajuru was also sentenced to one month and five days in open prison for offending the honor of fellow sports journalist Milton Neves. For presenter Luciana Gimenez, the commentator had to pay compensation of 40 thousand for moral damages, and will also be obliged to pay interest and monetary correction, counted from the beginning of the process. According to Kajuru himself, there have been more than 130 lawsuits against him.

== Disappearance ==
On July 2, 2016, Jorge Kajuru disappeared without giving any news of his whereabouts. However, the journalist reappeared two days later. Kajuru claimed that he was hiding in the interior of São Paulo, after having, according to him, received death threats.

== Political positions ==
When Jorge Kajuru was the leader of the Brazilian Socialist Party in the Senate, when asked whether he was left or right he stated that "I hate this business of talking about being left or right".

=== Mores ===
Kajuru is against the legalization of abortion and has shown that he is in favor of easing the carrying of a weapon, he also stated that lowering the criminal age must be dealt with on a case-by-case basis and that marijuana is "in practice, already legal".

=== Economy ===
Kajuru criticized the pension reform proposal, saying it is in surplus and advocating a debt audit to combat spending. He also advocated pension reform to make it more progressive.

=== Politics ===
Jorge Kajuru is an enthusiast of digital democracy, consulting polls on his Facebook page for various topics such as his vote for the Senate presidency. Kajuru is also in favor of ending re-election to the executive.

=== Bolsonaro government ===
During the 2018 elections, he declared preference to Jair Bolsonaro, but stated that he would remain independent in the Senate.

In June 2019, he voted against the government's Arms Decree, which made public ownership and possession more flexible.

In 2021 Kajuru and Senator Alessandro Vieira filed a writ of mandamus in the STF requesting the opening of a CPI (Parliamentary Commission of Inquiry) to investigate the actions of the federal government in the fight against the COVID-19 pandemic. The request was accepted on April 9 by Minister Luis Roberto Barroso.

On April 11 and 12, Kajuru published a recorded telephone conversation between himself and President Bolsonaro. In the audios, the president asked the senator for the COVID-19 CPI to also investigate mayors and governors, as well as for Kajuru to present impeachment requests against STF ministers. In another part of the conversation, Bolsonaro addressed offenses and threatened senator Randolfe Rodrigues, author of the CPI's request, with aggression.

== Health problems ==
Over the years Jorge Kajuru has faced numerous health problems, most of which are related to diabetes.

In 2009 he underwent experimental surgery to try to control the disease. After some time he lost more than seventy kilos and lost the sight in his left eye.

On November 19, 2019, during a session of the Federal Senate, Kajuru became unwell as a result of a seizure and required immediate hospitalization. A CT scan revealed the presence of a clot in the parliamentarian's brain.
