= Covaxgate =

Vaccine controversy in Brazil

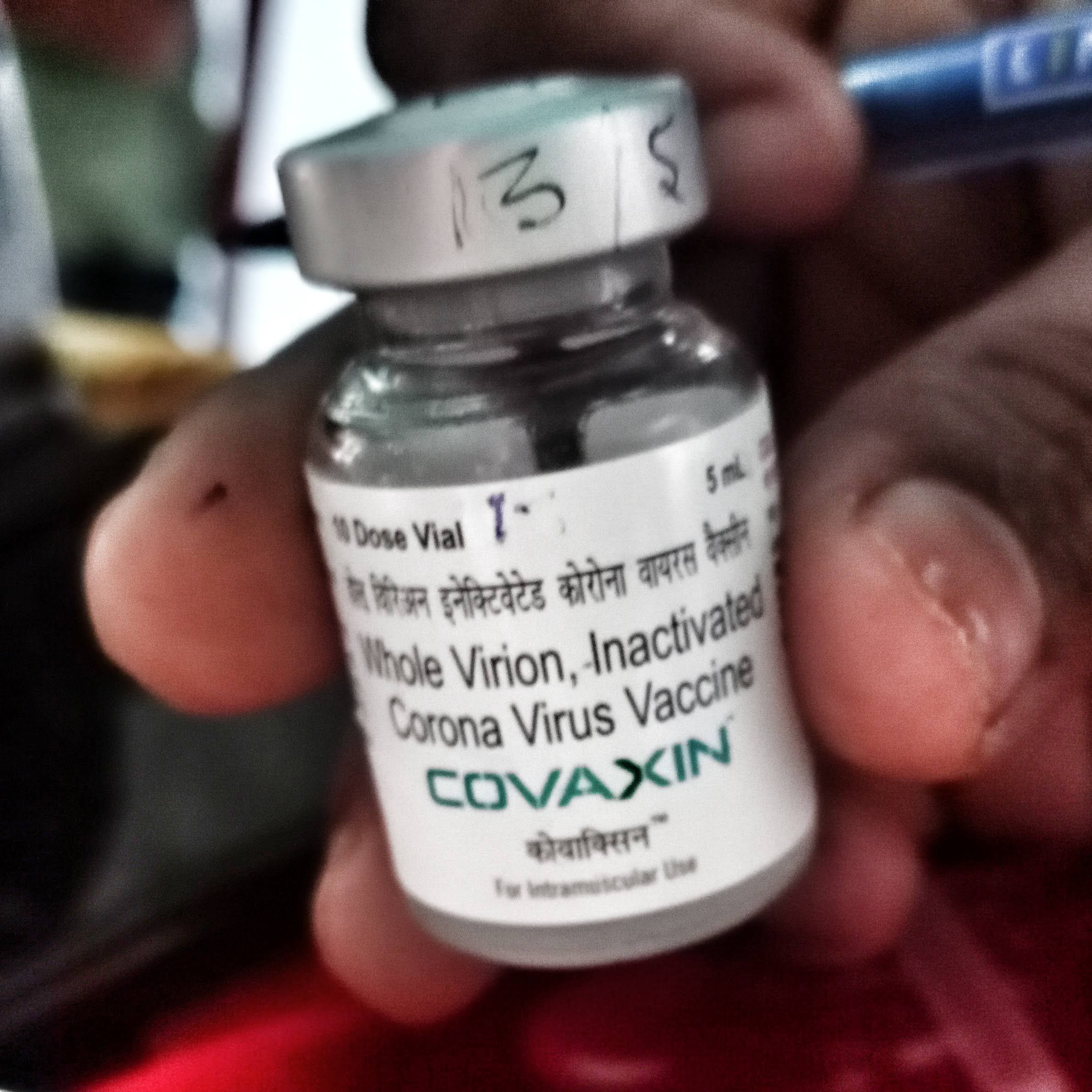
- Ampoule of Covaxin
- Native name: Caso Covaxin
- Date: 16 June 2021; 5 years ago
- Time: (UTC−3)
- Duration: 5 years and 6 days
- Location: Brazil
- Also known as: Covaxgate
- Type: Alleged overbilling of 20 million doses of Covaxin vaccine by members of the Brazilian government

The Case Covaxin, also known as Covaxgate, refers to an investigation made by the Brazilian Federal Public Ministry (MPF), held on 16 June 2021, which found evidence of irregularities in the purchase of 20 million doses by the Ministry of Health of the Indian vaccine Covaxin, with the value of the vaccines 1000% higher than initially foreseen.

The Prosecutor General of the Republic has also asked to investigate whether President Jair Bolsonaro committed the crime of misfeasance, for allegedly failing to report to investigative bodies evidence of corruption in the negotiations to purchase the vaccine.

== Investigation ==
An investigation by the Federal Public Ministry (MPF), conducted on 16 June 2021, found evidence of irregularities in the purchase of 20 million doses of the vaccine through the pharmaceutical company Precisa Medicamentos, with the value of the vaccines 1000% higher than the initial value shown initially by Bharat Biotech six months earlier. On 29 June, the contract for the purchase of the vaccine was suspended by the Ministry of Health after "controversies".

=== Miranda brothers ===
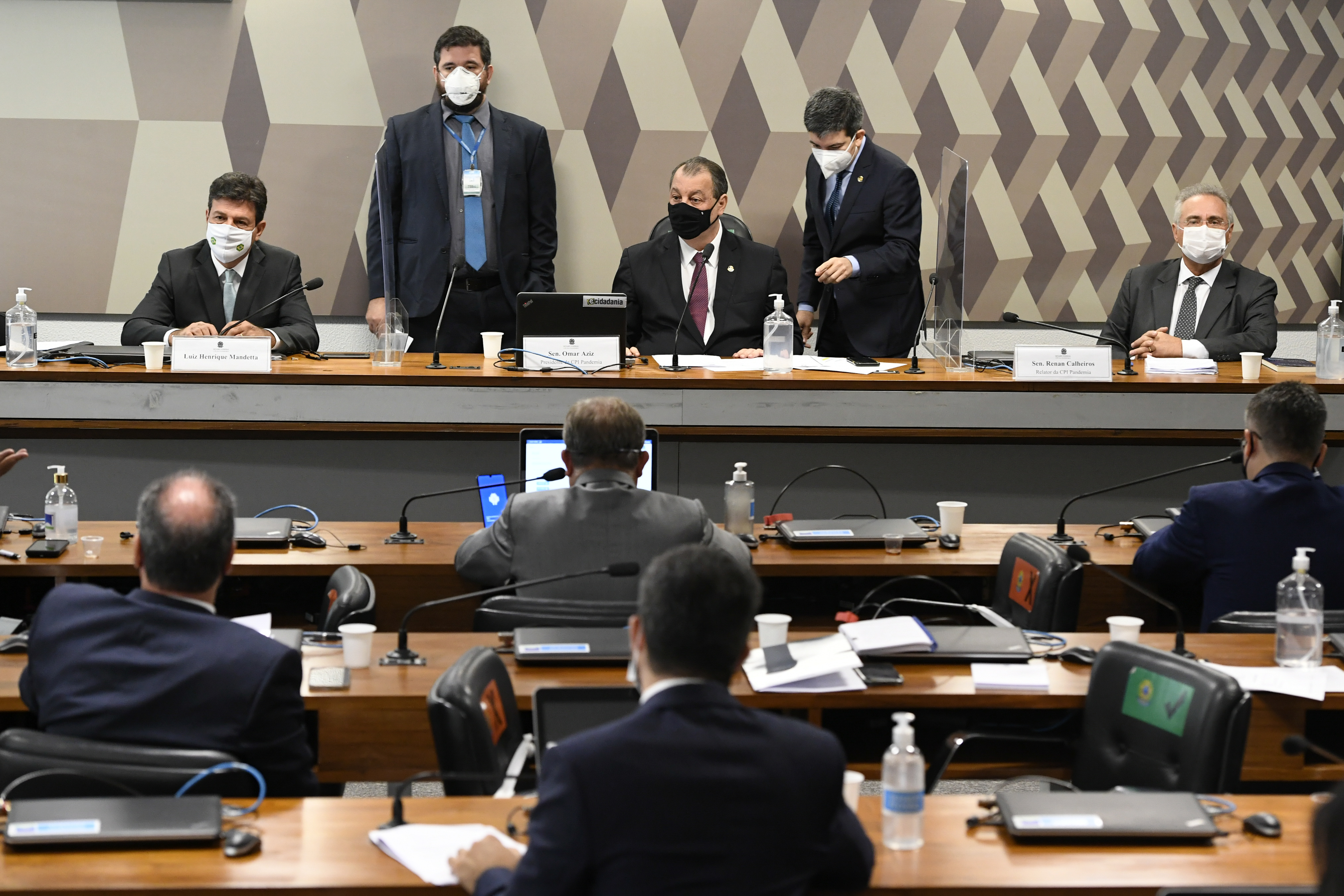
Table of COVID-19 CPI on 4 May 2021

On Friday, 25 June 2021, Congressman Luis Miranda (DEM-DF) and his brother, Luis Ricardo Miranda, a civil servant at the Ministry of Health, were heard at the COVID-19 CPI. The Miranda brothers said that the contract for the purchase of the Indian vaccine Covaxin was agenda. During testimony, Ricardo Miranda refuted Onyx Lorenzoni's accusations. After suspecting corruption in the Covaxin purchase, the congressman and the civil servant claim that they would have met with President Bolsonaro.

=== Brazilian Supreme Court ===
On 2 July 2021, the Prosecutor General of the Republic asked the Supreme Federal Court to open an inquiry to investigate Bolsonaro for the possible crime of misfeasance in the Covaxin vaccine overbilling case, in a development of the investigations carried out by the COVID-19 CPI.

== Search and seizure warrants ==
By determination of the STF minister Dias Toffoli and appreciated by the COVID-19 CPI, the Federal Police searched the headquarters of Precisa Medicamentos in São Paulo. The vaccine contract, already cancelled, is also investigated by the Federal Audit Court and the Federal Public Prosecutor's Office.

== Covaxin ==
Covaxin is a vaccine against COVID-19 produced in India by the Bharat Biotech laboratory. In January 2021, Precisa Med signed a contract with Bharat Biotech to supply Covaxin in Brazil.

It was one of the first to be used in the world for emergency vaccination and would be one of the vaccines applied by Brazil, where it would be produced in partnership with Precisa Medicamentos, and the Ministry of Health estimated to use it in February 2021. On 5 February 2021, the National Health Surveillance Agency (Anvisa) announced that it had received an application to study the vaccine in Brazil.

On 26 February the Government of Brazil announced that it would buy 20 million doses of the Indian Covaxin vaccine.

=== Sanitary risk ===
On 30 March 2021, Anvisa announced that it had denied the manufacturer the Good Manufacturing Practices Certificate due to "health risk to users," having found, after an inspection of Bharat in India, "non-conformities, being three critical, 12 major and 14 minor, which together denote a significant risk to manufacturing and quality assurance of the product."

=== Approval ===
The vaccine was approved for emergency use at the end of February 2021.

COVID-19: emergency release (January 2021)
Vacinal candidate (developer/financier)	Current situation	Effectiveness	Country of origin	Technology	Testing phase; number of participants	Adverse effects	References and notes
Covaxin or BBV152 (Bharat Biotech)	Released for emergency use	81%	India	Inactivated virus	Phase 3 closed; 25,800 participants	Common: pain at the injection site, headache, fatigue and fever	Note 1: the vaccine was released in India before data from phase 2 trials Note 2: in Brazil it would be produced in partnership with Precisa Medicamentos

== See also ==
- COVID-19 vaccination in Brazil
- COVID-19 misinformation
- COVID-19 CPI
- Presidency of Jair Bolsonaro
- List of scandals in Brazil
