= COVID-19 vaccination in Brazil =

Plan to immunize against COVID-19

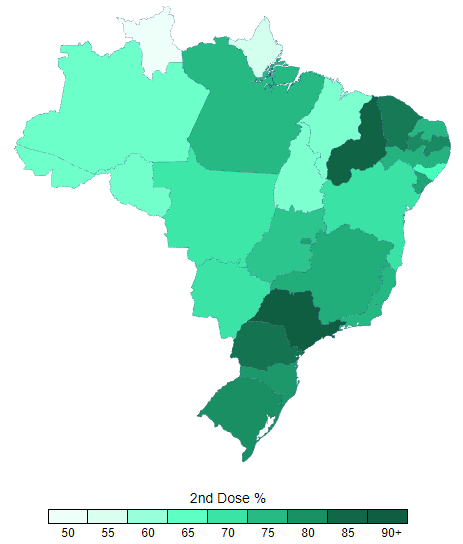
- Vaccination in July 13, 2022
- Date: 17 January 2021 – present
- Duration: 5 years, 7 months and 12 days
- Location: Brazil
- Cause: COVID-19 pandemic in Brazil
- Target: Population aged 6 months or older
- Budget: R$27.5 billion
- Organised by: Ministry of Health of Brazil; Federative units and municipalities of Brazil
- Participants: 189.64 million (dose 1 of 2); 176.16 million (all doses); 126.39 million (booster doses)
- Outcome: 88.10% partially vaccinated (1 of 2 doses); 81.80% fully vaccinated 58.70% fully vaccinated with a booster dose
- Website: Governo Federal
- Updated in 28 November 2023

The COVID-19 vaccination campaign in Brazil is an ongoing mass immunization campaign for the COVID-19 pandemic in Brazil. It started on 17 January 2021, when the country had 210 thousand deaths.

The Instituto Butantan imported the first 6 million doses of CoronaVac in a collaboration with the Chinese company Sinovac Biotech.

There is no deadline forecast for immunizing the country's entire population due to the lack of supplies for vaccine production and also due to political disputes between the São Paulo state government and the Jair Bolsonaro government.

According to a June 2022 study published in The Lancet, COVID-19 vaccination in Brazil prevented an additional 1 million deaths from 8 December 2020 to 8 December 2021.

== Background ==
Before the Butantan vaccine, Fiocruz sought permission from the Brazilian Health Regulatory Agency (Anvisa) to import the vaccine. It would be more than two million doses of the vaccines developed by Oxford University and the pharmaceutical company AstraZeneca. Anvisa approved, on 17 January 2021, the emergency use of the vaccine in Brazil. On 22 January 2021, after an obstacle between the Indian and Brazilian governments, Brazil received another two million doses of the AstraZeneca vaccine. On the same day, Anvisa approved another 4.8 million doses of the CoronaVac vaccine for emergency use.

== Initial deployment ==
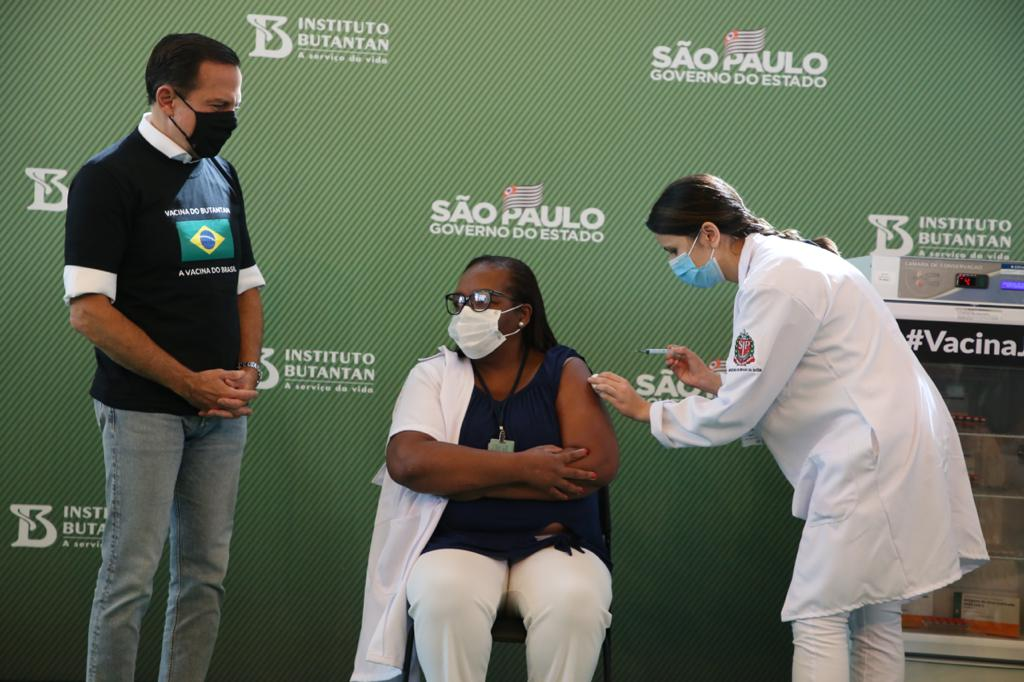
Nurse Mônica Calazans receiving the first dose of the CoronaVac vaccine, minutes after its approval by Anvisa. On the left, Governor of São Paulo, João Doria

Soon after the vaccines were approved for emergency use, the government of São Paulo held a press conference to perform the first application. Nurse Mônica Calazans was the first person outside the clinical trials to be vaccinated against COVID in the country.

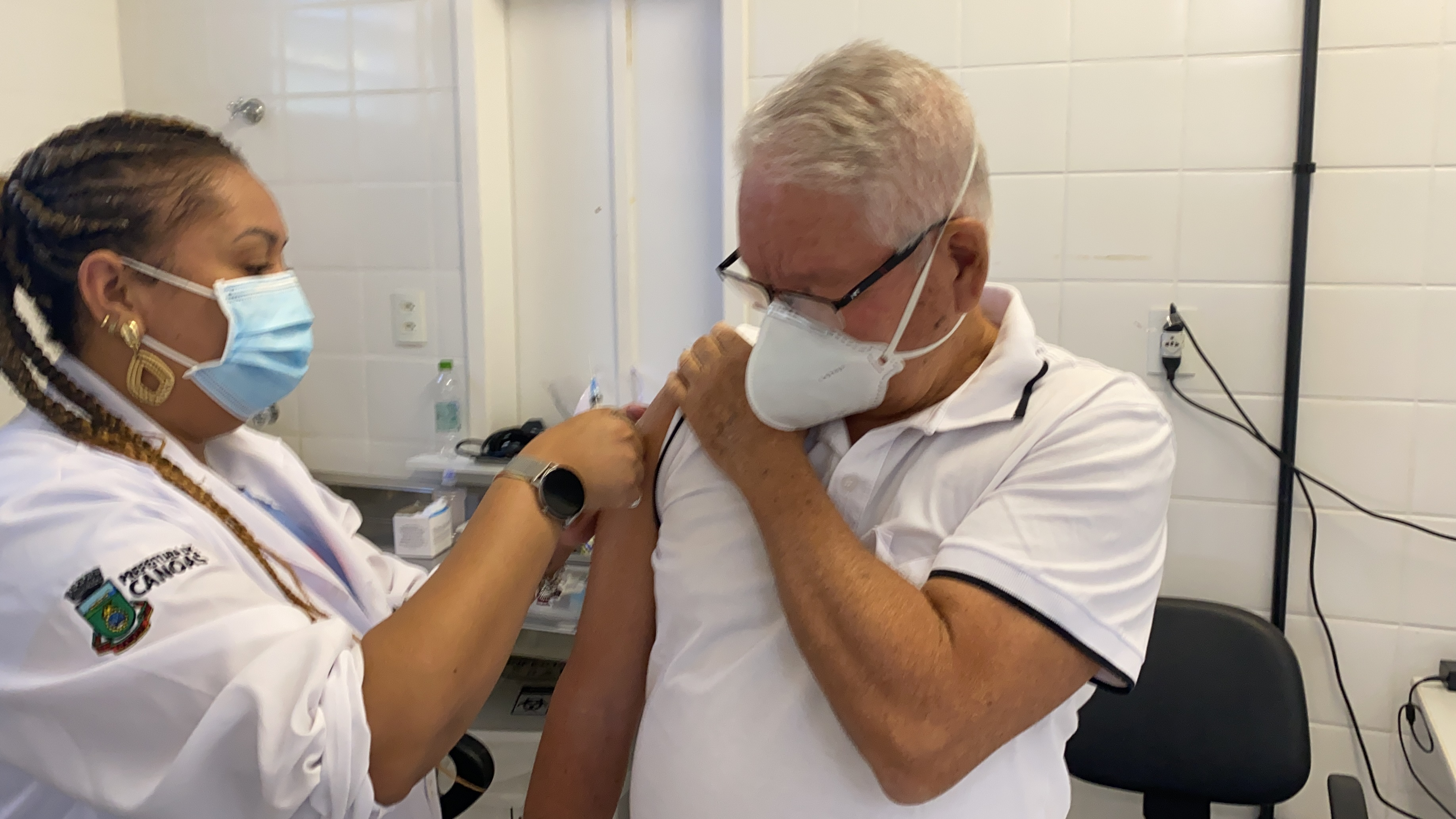
Elderly man receiving the second dose of CoronaVac vaccine in Canoas, Rio Grande do Sul

The vaccination campaign throughout the country would have started on 18 January 2021, at 5 pm (UTC-3), however, due to logistical problems, part of the states postponed it to the 19th, since the vaccines would only arrive at night. The states that started vaccination on the 18th were São Paulo, Rio de Janeiro, Rio Grande do Sul, Amazonas, Mato Grosso, Paraná, Pernambuco, Minas Gerais, Espírito Santo, Maranhão, Tocantins, Mato Grosso do Sul, Ceará, Goiás, Piauí, and Santa Catarina. Mostly nursing technicians, nurses, blacks, and women were responsible for opening the vaccination campaign in the states.

In the artistic world, the actresses Zezé Motta and Solange Couto became the first personalities to be vaccinated. The social worker and nursing technician, Vanuzia Costa, from the multiethnic village Sons of this Earth, was the first one vaccinated among the indigenous people.

On 23 January 2021, in a symbolic act, vaccination was started in Brazil with the Oxford immunizer. The first person to receive the vaccine was the infectologist Estevão Portela. At the same occasion the pneumologist Margareth Dalcolmo was also vaccinated. Doctor Sarah Ananda Gomes was the third to be vaccinated. Soon after, seven more health professionals were immunized.

== Timeline and goals ==
Logo from the Vaccination Campaign. Vaccination Immunized Brazil We are just one Nation

On 17 February 2021, then-health minister, Eduardo Pazuello, in a meeting with governors, presented a schedule about vaccination in Brazil. He stated that between February and July 2021, an additional 230.7 million doses of vaccines against COVID-19 will be distributed.

On 3 March, the Ministry of Health published in the Official Gazette a decree that mentioned the exemption of bidding in the acquisition of 38 million vaccines from Janssen (pharmaceutical branch of Johnson & Johnson group) and 100 million doses of the Pfizer vaccine. Thus far, the vaccines approved for definitive use in the country were the Pfizer/BioNTech and Oxford/AstraZeneca vaccines. The Butantan/Sinovac and Janssen vaccines, on the other hand, are only authorized for emergency use and are intended for priority groups. Negotiations between Brazil and Pfizer/BioNtech began in the second half of 2020, but did not move forward due to the Brazilian government's refusal to accept a contractual clause exempting the pharmaceutical company from bearing the costs of possible side effects of the vaccine.

On 4 March, in a final meeting for contractual arrangements with Pfizer, the Ministry of Health ended up giving in and accepted the clauses imposed by the pharmaceutical company and that blocked the negotiations for Brazil to acquire Pfizer's vaccines. Among the clauses is that Pfizer will not be held responsible for the costs of eventual side effects of its immunizer. In other words: "that a term of responsibility for eventual side effects of the vaccine be signed". The Ministry of Health said that this signing was possible thanks to Bill 534 of 2021 that mentions that "the Union, the States, the Federal District and the municipalities are authorized to purchase vaccines and to assume the risks related to civil liability, under the terms of the instrument of purchase or supply of vaccines entered into, in relation to post-vaccination adverse events".

The contract has already been signed and analysed by the Ministry of Health's legal department.

In a schedule released on 5 March, by the Ministry of Health, the CoronaVac vaccines from the Butantan Institute will be delivered weekly throughout March to the states and the Federal District. In all, 22.7 million doses of CoronaVac are expected to be distributed. According to the Ministry of Health they will also be delivered:

- 3.7 million doses of the AstraZeneca/Oxford immunizer in the second half of March;
- 2.9 million doses by the World Health Organization (WHO) Covax Facility alliance;
- 8 million of Covaxin - Indian vaccine not yet approved by Anvisa. With this, there will be a total distribution to the states and to the Federal District of 38 million doses in March, a number below the one estimated by the Ministry of Health in February for the following month: 46 million doses. That is a reduction of 7.8 million doses of vaccine for the month of March.

On 16 April 2021, Minister Marcelo Queiroga announced the anticipation of the delivery of 1 million ready doses of the Pfizer vaccine. What was supposed to be in June, would now be on 29 April. The cargo of vaccines arrived at Viracopos airport, Campinas, São Paulo from Belgium.

On 11 May 2021, the Ministry of Health announced the purchase of an additional 100 million doses of the Tozinameran vaccine from Pfizer/BioNTech. With this, the company must deliver throughout 2021, an additional 199 million doses. Two weeks ago, 1 million were already delivered.

Also on 11 May, the ministry vetoed the use of the Oxford/AstraZeneca vaccine in pregnant women because of cases of thrombosis reported in other countries. Pregnant women who have already been vaccinated with vaccines from this laboratory must be followed up.

On 22 April 2022, the Ministry of Health declared the end of the national public health emergency, effective 22 May. This allowed private vaccination clinics to offer COVID-19 vaccines to the private market. The first vaccine available in the Brazilian private market is Fiocruz's Oxford–AstraZeneca vaccine for about R$325 (US$60).

== Mass vaccination studies ==
=== Serrana ===
The city of Serrana, in the interior of São Paulo, became the first Brazilian municipality to carry out mass vaccination with the population over 18 years old, divided into four groups. The campaign began on 17 February 2021, and is part of a study by the Butantan Institute, entitled "Project S", using the Coronavac vaccine. The participation of the population, however, is not mandatory, since it is a voluntary research work. Serrana was chosen because of its proximity to Ribeirão Preto, another important city in São Paulo. According to a balance released on 14 March, 97% of the population had already been vaccinated. On 17 March, the application of the second dose to the target public began. The project came to an end on 11 April in a virtual ceremony. During the campaign, there was a large reduction in Covid's hospitalization of severe cases, besides the low number of deaths with only six deaths, totaling a mortality of 0.004%, and the absence of waiting lines for an ICU bed.

=== Botucatu ===
On 27 April 2021, the city of Botucatu, interior of São Paulo, was chosen by the Ministry of Health to start the mass vaccination phase in the population over 18 years old. The vaccine used was the AZD1222, in partnership with the University of Oxford, the AstraZeneca laboratory, the Oswaldo Cruz Foundation (Fiocruz), the Gates Foundation, São Paulo State University (Unesp), and the city government. The campaign aims to test the effectiveness of the Oxford Vaccine and its efficiency in relation to mass vaccination. Just like the Butantan Institute's Project S, carried out in Serrana, the participation of the population will not be mandatory and will also not interfere with the National Immunization Plan, since those who have already been vaccinated locally do not need to participate in the project. Botucatu was chosen because the project covers more people and because it is the regional pole of the Hospital de Clínicas, which serves sixty municipalities and has already held a mass vaccination campaign in 2009 during the campaign against yellow fever, using children, besides being the city with the second lowest fatality rate against covid with 1.60% among municipalities with 100,000 inhabitants. The studies will last eight months. The campaign started on 16 May.

== Vaccine orders and deliveries ==
COVID-19 vaccine doses received in Brazil in millions

Vaccine	Doses in 2021	Price per dose	Emergency Use Approval	Deployment	Final Approval
Comirnaty (Pfizer–BioNTech)	184 million	$11.00	Skipped	4 May 2021	23 Feb 2021
Oxford–AstraZeneca	164 million	$3.16	17 Jan 2021	23 Jan 2021	12 Mar 2021
Janssen	35 million	$10.00	31 Mar 2021	25 Jun 2021	5 Apr 2022
CoronaVac	104 million	$11.60	17 Jan 2021	17 Jan 2021	Pending
Spikevax (Moderna)	0	≈$11.00	Skipped	15 May 2024	26 Jun 2023
Covovax (Novavax)	0	Unknown	Skipped	2025	9 Jan 2024

The Oxford-AstraZeneca vaccine in Brazil is manufactured by:

- SK Bioscience received through COVAX
- Serum Institute of India (Covishield)
- Bio-Manguinhos/Fiocruz, finished and filled with active ingredients supplied by AstraZeneca's partner Shenzhen Kangtai Biological Products

Vaxzevria is the only Oxford-AstraZeneca vaccine recognized by the European Medicines Agency, but it has not been deployed in Brazil. Even so, many European countries accept travelers vaccinated with Covishield variants, including the Fiocruz vaccine.

== Vaccination progress ==
Number of people vaccinated against COVID-19 in Brazil Partial (1 dose of 2) Full Boosted

The target vaccination coverage planned by most countries is generally around 60-70%. It may need to be significantly increased to stop the Delta variant.

The milestone of 60% population coverage of partial vaccination (at least 1 of 2 doses) was reached on 24 August 2021. On 23 September 250.3 thousand boosters had already been administered. On 30 March 2022, 75% of the population was fully vaccinated.

By the end of December, about 20 million people had not returned for their second dose, and their reserved doses were about to expire. The Ministry of Health then announced the donation of 10 million doses to COVAX.

=== Booster doses ===
On 25 August 2021, the Ministry of Health announced that booster vaccination would begin on 15 September for people over 70 years who have been fully vaccinated for at least six months and for individuals with immunodeficiency fully vaccinated for at least 28 days. On 31 August, the cities of Salvador and Curitiba began administering booster doses to the elderly ahead of schedule, soon followed by most other state capitals.

On 16 November, the Ministry of Health announced that a booster dose will be offered to all adults five months after the second dose. The booster dose will be the same vaccine as the initial course, except for those vaccinated with CoronaVac, who will receive the Pfizer–BioNTech vaccine as a booster. On 20 December, to increase protection against the Omicron variant, the Ministry of Health announced that it will offer the booster dose after four months and a fourth dose after four months for individuals with immunodeficiency.

On 22 November 2022, the Brazilian Health Regulatory Agency (Anvisa) approved the two bivalent versions of the Pfizer–BioNTech COVID-19 vaccine against the Omicron BA.1 and BA.4/BA.5 subvariants.

== Vaccine acceptance and hesitancy ==
Vaccine acceptance and hesitancy
- Will get vaccinated
- Partially vaccinated
- Won't get vaccinated
- Does not know
Polling on vaccination obligatoriness
- Should be mandatory
- Does not know
- Should be voluntary

A voluntary anonymous online survey conducted by the Oswaldo Cruz Foundation in late January 2021 with 173,178 respondents found that 89.5% of the respondents intended to be vaccinated, 6.7% would accept vaccination depending on the vaccine, 1.3% were uncertain and 2.5% would not accept any vaccine.

On 7 October 2021, an opinion poll by Paraná Pesquisas found that 70% supported the requirement of vaccine passports, 27% were against the requirement and 3% did not know or did not want to give an opinion.

On 29 November, a telephone survey conducted by the World Band and the United Nations Development Programme revealed that Brazil has the lowest level of vaccine hesitancy in Latin America, around 3%, while the Latin American average is 8%. Hesitation is low even among supporters of unvaccinated president Jair Bolsonaro, who claimed that the Pfizer–BioNTech vaccine could turn recipients into alligators and cause HIV/AIDS and suggested that CoronaVac could cause death and disability, all false. Experts ascribe resilience against such falsehoods to long-standing vaccination programs run by the public health system and to the inclusion of a vaccination requirement in social welfare programs. At the same time, vaccination coverage has been decreasing in Brazil since 2011, mainly among rural families and people with low education.

== Vaccine passport ==
By 28 September 2021, 249 municipalities had approved the requirement of a vaccine passport ahead of state and federal determinations.

Several federative units have approved the requirement of a vaccine passport in physical or digital form to allow entry to some venues or participation in some activities: São Paulo, Rio Grande do Sul, Pernambuco, Ceará, Pará, Santa Catarina, Amazonas, Paraíba, Espírito Santo, Piauí, the Federal District and Acre. Several state capitals have adopted similar requirements in states without them: Rio de Janeiro, Belo Horizonte, Salvador, Maceió, Aracaju, Cuiabá, Macapá, Porto Velho and Palmas. In Santa Catarina, Belo Horizonte, Maceió and Aracaju, a negative RT-PCR issued within 72 hours is accepted in place of the vaccine passport.

== Priority groups ==
The COVID-19 national vaccination plan defines the following priority groups and order:

1. Institutionalized elderly people aged 60 years and over
2. Institutionalized adults with disabilities
3. Indigenous adults living in indigenous territories
4. Health workers
5. Age 90 or older
6. Ages 85 to 89
7. Ages 80 to 84
8. Ages 75 to 79
9. Adults from traditional ribeirinho peoples and communities
10. Adults from traditional quilombola peoples and communities
11. Ages 70 to 74
12. Ages 65 to 69
13. Ages 60 to 64
14. Pregnant and postpartum adult women; adults with comorbidities; adults with permanent disabilities receiving social security benefits
15. Adults with permanent disabilities not receiving social security benefits
16. Homeless adults aged 18 to 59
17. Prisoners and employees of the prison system
18. Basic education workers
19. Higher education workers
20. Police and armed forces
21. Road passenger transport workers
22. Rail transport workers
23. Air transport workers
24. Waterborne transport workers
25. Truck drivers
26. Stevedores
27. Industrial workers
28. Street sweepers and solid waste management workers
29. Pregnant and postpartum adolescents
30. Adolescents with permanent disabilities
31. Adolescents with comorbidities
32. Adolescent prisoners
33. Other adolescents after completion of booster vaccination of people aged 70 or older and people with immunodeficiency

The following comorbidities are eligible for inclusion in the high priority group:

- Diabetes
- Severe chronic lung diseases
- Resistant hypertension
- Stage III hypertension
- Stage I or II hypertension with end organ damage
- Heart failure
- Pulmonary heart disease, pulmonary hypertension
- Hypertensive heart disease
- Coronary syndromes
- Valvular heart diseases
- Cardiomyopathies, pericardial disorders
- Diseases of the aorta, diseases of the large vessels, arteriovenous fistulas
- Arrhythmias
- Congenital heart defects
- Heart valve prostheses, implanted cardiac devices
- Chronic neurological disorders
- Chronic kidney disease
- Immunodeficiency
- Severe hemoglobinopathies
- Morbid obesity
- Down syndrome
- Cirrhosis

== Controversies ==
=== Accusations of queue jumping and suspension of vaccination in Manaus ===
The Public Ministry received complaints of people accused of jumping the vaccination queue in at least eight Brazilian states, through videos and photos posted on social networks. According to the National Immunization Plan (PNI), the first phase corresponds to health professionals, seniors over sixty who live in nursing homes, and the indigenous population. In the Federal District, the Health Secretariat announced that it will investigate the irregularities after groups outside the first phase took the vaccine. In Amazonas, the capital Manaus announced the temporary suspension of vaccination on 21 January, to reassess the priority of the first group, since the doses of the vaccine are considered insufficient, besides there is a report of deviation of 60,000 doses of the CoronaVac vaccine and children of businessmen taking the doses without being part of the priority groups.

In Bahia, through the city of Candiba, the mayor Reginaldo Martins Prado (PSD) posted a photo receiving the dose of the vaccine against COVID-19, without yet being part of the priority group, leading to the opening of lawsuits in the MP and MPF preventing the application of the second dose, in addition to the application of fines. In Sergipe, in the city of Itabi, the mayor Júnior de Amintas (DEM) was the first to be vaccinated, generating a revolt from the population, since he is 45 years old, below the age range of the first phase. In Pernambuco, in the city of Jupi, the Health Secretary Maria Nadir Ferro and a photographer who works in the city hall, known as Guilherme JG, who took the vaccine, even without being part of the priority group. The two public servants were removed. In the capital of Rio Grande do Norte, the city of Natal, the State Public Ministry investigates reports that city hall employees, outside the priority group for vaccination, were immunized. According to the reports, submitted to the MP by the Union of Public Servants of the City of Natal, employees who hold commissioned positions in the Municipal Secretariat of Social Assistance received CoronaVac in one of the vaccination sites in the city. Among them is the head of the IT sector of the secretariat, who shared on social networks the record of the moment he was immunized.

In the city of Pombal in Paraíba, the mayor Abmael de Sousa Lacerda (MDB), better known as Dr. Verissinho, was the first person to take the vaccine in the city, even without being part of the priority groups, according to a complaint that reached the MPF. In Ceará, in the city of Juazeiro do Norte, the deputy mayor Giovanni Sampaio (Podemos) was the first one vaccinated in the city. He is an obstetrician and, according to the city hall, works as a volunteer in the municipality's health units. In a statement, the Public Prosecutor's Office of Ceará says that it has established a notice of fact to investigate "alleged violation of the rules of vaccination by a municipal official" and that it will decide, after investigation, what is the appropriate measure in the case. The MP also investigates the vaccination of Benedita Oliveira, Quixadá's health secretary. In Castanhal, in Pará, the administrative director of the Municipal Hospital was dismissed by the city government after being accused of jumping the line of the CoronaVac vaccine. The public agent Laureno Lemos, 38, presented himself for vaccination in the early evening of Tuesday, 19, just after the first dose was applied in the server Nivalda Pestana, 58, who has worked for almost 20 years in the hospital laundry and is on the front line of COVID-19.

=== Vaccine deviation controversies and the empty syringe case ===
During the course of vaccination, there have been several accusations involving the deviation of vaccine doses by health professionals and political leaders in various locations around the country.

In several municipalities around the country, there have been flagrant cases of health professionals pretending to vaccinate the elderly, using empty syringes or not squeezing the plunger of the syringe. There have been cases where discarded syringes were found with liquid inside. In the cases reported, the professionals were removed and the elderly returned later to take the correct dose of vaccine. Health authorities consider the cases "isolated". The Federal Council of Nursing (COFEN), the Public Ministry of the State of Rio de Janeiro (MPRJ), and the police are investigating whether the false applications are related to the deviation of vaccine vials. The cases have been called "wind vaccinations" by the media.

=== Vaccination interruption in some Brazilian cities ===
Soon after approaching one month from the beginning of the vaccination campaign in the country, several Brazilian cities, including capitals such as Salvador, Rio de Janeiro and Curitiba started to restrict the priority groups and then announce the interruption of the vaccination campaign until the arrival of new doses to the states. The action generated a movement by the state governments to start negotiations on their own with the laboratories, with a group uniting sixteen states, led by governor Wellington Dias (PT-PI). With the arrival of new doses of Coronavac and Covishield on the 24th, the vaccination calendar is resumed in the cities where there was a pause.

On 23 February 2021, the Supreme Federal Court (STF) decided by simple majority that state governments and municipalities have the autonomy to purchase vaccines on their own if the federal government does not comply with the vaccination schedule. The release of vaccines approved by foreign agencies was also approved, in case the Brazilian Health Regulatory Agency (Anvisa) does not decide on the issue within 72 hours. The authorized agencies are the Food and Drug Administration (FDA), from the United States; the European Medicines Agency (EMA), from the European Union; the Pharmaceuticals and Medical Devices Agency (PMDA), from Japan; and the National Medical Products Administration (NMPA), from China. On the 24th, the Senate approves the PL that authorizes the purchase of vaccines by the private sector, as long as 50% of the doses are donated to the Unified Health System (SUS).

=== Use of different vaccines ===
In Natal, a physical therapist received the first dose from AstraZeneca, but the second dose she received was from Sinovac Biotech. The health department of Rio Grande do Norte acknowledged the error and said that the professional will be monitored.

In the Federal District, a 93-year-old received two doses of different vaccines. According to G1, he first got vaccinated with the AstraZeneca, but his granddaughter scheduled for only one month the second dose, and ended up receiving the Sinovac Biotech. In a statement, the health department of the Federal District said that the elderly will have monthly monitoring and checks of the clinical status.

In Rondônia, 35 health professionals from a hospital received doses from different laboratories. In a note, the state health secretariat said it is investigating the case.

On 16 April 2021, the Ministry of Health informed in a statement that if there are reports of people with thrombosis because of the Oxford/AstraZeneca vaccine, another vaccine from another laboratory will be applied. Also in the clarification, the ministry stressed that the vaccine to be applied is not from a viral vector. The only ones purchased by the government that do not have this technology are the Pfizer/BioNTech and Moderna vaccines. Brazil is the first country in the world to have this initiative.

=== Clandestine immunization in Minas Gerais ===
According to Piauí Magazine, on 24 March 2021, a group of businessmen from Minas Gerais illegally imported doses of the Pfizer vaccine to get vaccinated in a garage. None of them were in the priority group. A hospital employee, who is a neighbor of this garage, filmed the moment the clandestine immunization took place. One day after the denunciation, there was a Federal Police operation in the state to carry out search and seizure warrants, and it was authorized by the 35th Criminal Court of Belo Horizonte. ANVISA sent a letter to the police to investigate this illegal importation by individuals.

In the second phase of the operation, an elderly caregiver and two big bus businessmen were arrested by the Federal Police. In her house, ampoules of sodium chloride and flu vaccines were found. In a statement released to the press, Pfizer denied having sold doses to Brazil to individuals and reaffirmed, along with BioNTech, that it will deliver 100 million doses to the Federal Government throughout 2021. Another 57 people are also investigated.

On 18 March 2021, the Legislative Assembly of Minas Gerais installed a CPI to investigate vaccination irregularities in addition to the accusations of queue jumping.

=== Overpricing in the purchase of doses of Covaxin vaccine ===
The Federal Public Ministry (MPF) identified evidence of irregularities in the purchase of 20 million doses of the Indian vaccine Covaxin, a fact that led the health minister Marcelo Queiroga to enter the list of investigated by the CPI of COVID-19, after documents from the Ministry of Foreign Affairs show that the federal government paid for the vaccines a value 1000% higher than the first offer submitted six months earlier. In addition, there were some warnings coming from people linked to the government such as the civil servant Luiz Ricardo Miranda and his brother, federal deputy Luis Miranda (DEM-DF) about irregularities in the purchase of the vaccine, but the warning was in vain. After the complaints were filed, the government denies irregularities and speaks of "evidence of tampering" in a document presented by the deputy. On 29 June, the Ministry of Health announces the suspension of vaccine imports due to "controversies" with the contract.

=== Illegal application of extra doses ===
In the state of São Paulo, six people are investigated for being immunized with the third dose illegally. The cases occurred in Guarulhos, São Caetano do Sul, and São Paulo.

=== Vaccination campaign for children at age 5–11 ===
On 16 December 2021, Anvisa, the Brazilian medical regulatory agency, issued an authorization for the administration of the Pfizer/BioNTech COVID-19 vaccine to children between 5 and 11. President Bolsonaro went so far as to demand the release of the names of the Anvisa scientists who granted approval. After public discussions, the Ministry of Health declared on 5 January that the vaccination is going to start in January.
