= Carlos Wizard Martins =

Brazilian businessman

Carlos "Wizard" Martins
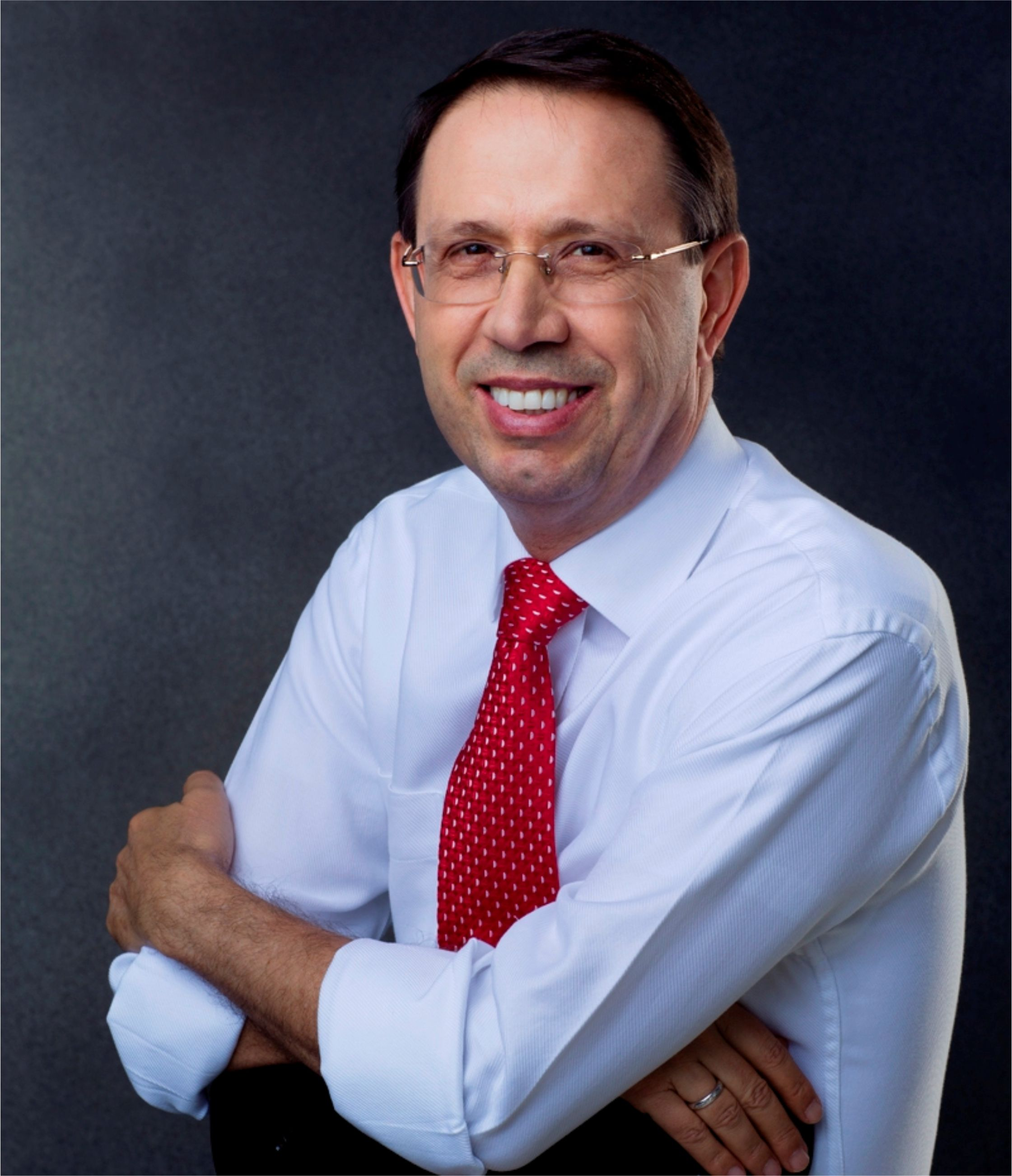
- Professor Carlos Wizard Martins
- Born: 1956 (age 69–70); Curitiba, Paraná, Brazil
- Education: Brigham Young University
- Occupations: Professor, Author and Entrepreneur
- Known for: Founder of Wizard Language Schools and the educational group Multi Education,
- Spouse: Vania Pimentel
- Children: 6

Carlos "Wizard" Martins (born 1956) is a Brazilian entrepreneur and founder of Grupo Multi, a company that offers franchises for English courses. Grupo Multi was bought out by Pearson in 2013.

== Early life ==
He was born in Curitiba, Paraná, Brazil. When he was thirteen he and his parents joined the Church of Jesus Christ of Latter-day Saints. It was through interactions with missionaries of the church that he learned English. At age 18 Martins went to the United States where he worked in Newark, New Jersey for a time.

== Career ==
Martins served a mission for the church in Portugal and later served as a bishop. In the early 1980s he went back to the United States with his wife and young family to study at Brigham Young University, where he received a degree in Computer Science and Statistics.

He then worked as a computer systems analyst in Brazil. He soon realized he was earning more by teaching his colleagues English, so he formed Wizard by Pearson.

Martins and his wife, the former Vania Pimentel, are the parents of six children.

From 2001 to 2005 Martins served as president of the Brazil João Pessoa Mission. Prior to this Martins had served for several years as president of the Campinas Brazil Castelo Stake.

In 2002 Martins wrote a self-help book entitled Vencendo a Própria Crise (Overcoming Personal Crisis).

His 2012 book Desperte o milionário que há em você (Awake the Millionaire Inside of You) was a Brazilian bestseller.

In his 2015 interview for the Creating Emerging Markets project at the Harvard Business School, he discusses in detail how he segmented the English language teaching market by developing a customized methodology which motivated executives and other students.
