= Alessandro Vieira =

Brazilian politician

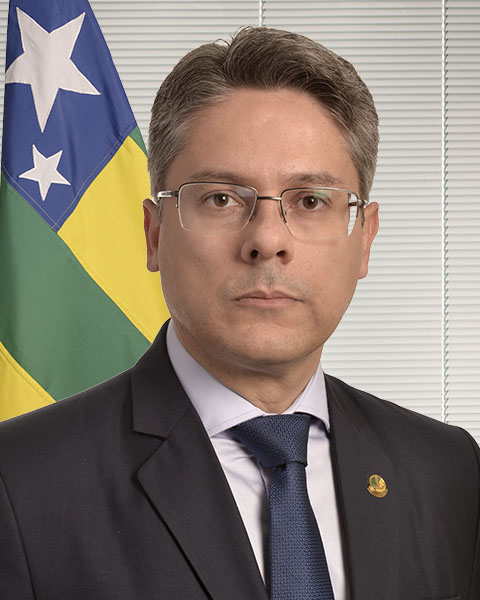
- Vieira in 2019

Senator for Sergipe
- Incumbent
- Assumed office 1 February 2019
- Preceded by: Eduardo Amorim

Senate Cidadania Leader
- Incumbent
- Assumed office 2 February 2021
- Preceded by: Eliziane Gama

Deputy General of the Civil Police of Sergipe
- In office 22 February 2016 – 19 April 2017
- Governor: Jackson Barreto
- Preceded by: Everton Santos
- Succeeded by: Catharina Feitosa

Personal details
- Born: 3 April 1975 (age 51) Passo Fundo, Rio Grande do Sul, Brazil
- Party: MDB (2023–present)
- Other political affiliations: REDE (2017–18); Cidadania (2018–2022); PSDB (2022–2023)
- Profession: Civil police officer

Alessandro Vieira (born 3 April 1975) sometimes better known as Delegado Alessandro Vieira is a federal senator of Brazil representing the state of Sergipe. Although born in Rio Grande do Sul, he has spent his political career representing Sergipe, and was previously deputy general of the civil police in the state from 2016 to 2017.

== Personal life ==
Vieira is married with three children. He has been a member of the civil police in Sergipe for 17 years.

== Political career ==
Vieira was appointed deputy general of the civil police in the state of Sergipe by then governor Jackson Barreto on 22 February 2016. On 18 April 2017 however Vieira, along with João Batista the deputy general of fire control, were dismissed by Barreto.

Vieira ran for a seat in the senate from Sergipe in the 2018 Brazilian general election, and was elected with 474,449 votes or 25.95% of the ballots cast. He ran for office under the banner of the Sustainability Network. In December 2018 however Vieira along with other sustainability network politicians joined the Popular Socialist Party.

Anti-corruption was the major theme of Vieira's election campaign. Vieira is a strong supporter of gun rights in Brazil, which was also one of the key topic of the campaign. In particular he is in favor of concealed carry and loosening the restriction on what type of guns Brazilians can buy.

Police appointments
Preceded by Everton Santos	Deputy General of the Civil Police of Sergipe; 2016–17	Succeeded by Catharina Feitosa
Federal Senate
Preceded by Eliziane Gama	Senate Cidadania Leader; 2021–present	Incumbent
