= Rogério Carvalho Santos =

Brazilian physician and politician

- Official portrait

Senator for Sergipe
- Incumbent
- Assumed office 1 February 2019

Personal details
- Born: Rogério Carvalho Santos; 2 August 1968 (age 58) Lagarto, Sergipe, Brazil
- Party: Workers' Party (Brazil)
- Spouse: Ivana Feliz
- Children: 2
- Profession: Politician

Rogério Carvalho Santos (born August 2, 1968) is a Brazilian physician and politician serving as Senator of the Brazilian state of Sergipe. He is a former State Surgeon General of Sergipe Department of Health in Brazil, and a member of the Workers' Party (PT).

== Education ==
Rogério Carvalho Santos has a PhD from Federal University of Sergipe (UFS) in Aracaju and received his M.D. degree and MBA in Preventive and Social Health Care, a specialization course in Hospital Management from the University of Campinas (Unicamp) at São Paulo. He worked as a consultant for UNI in Brazil; for the Santa Casa da Misericórdia, and was a researcher for the Comissão Interinstitucional Nacional de Avaliação de Ensino Médico.

== Political career ==
Carvalho Santos began his political career in the late 1980s as a student activist in the university of Sergipe and then president of the Direção Nacional dos Estudantes de Medicina. At Campinas he was the president of the Physicians Union and the Federation of Physicians of São Paulo state. Afterward, he became a member of the Workers' Party (Brazil) (PT). Carvalho has served as a member of several civic services.

== Deputy Mayor for Health ==
In 2000, Carvalho was nominated by Aracaju Mayor Marcelo Déda to hold the position. During his mandate the city was nominated by the Brazilian Health Minister (Ministério da Saúde (MS).) The Best Lifestyle City of Brazil. Carvalho setup also the emergency services (SAMU - Serviço de Atendimento Móvel de Urgência) of the city.

== State Surgeon General ==
In January 2006, Carvalho nominated by Governor Marcelo Deda to hold the position of Surgeon General of the State of Sergipe. In this position, Rogério Carvalho Santos serves as a member of the Governor's Cabinet and as his chief advisor on health policies. He also manages an agency that has more than 60,000 employees. The agency is responsible for 14 state departments, three Foundations and a board staff that provide the population from the state of Sergipe with health, developmental, mental, rehabilitative, social and other critical services. As State Surgeon General, Carvalho is responsible for providing leadership and for overseeing the agency's efforts to promote the health and well-being of the people from the state of Sergipe, particularly those who are most in need and at risk.

== Deputy ==
In 2010 Mr. Carvalho resign from is charge of State Surgeon General to act as Deputy in Chamber of Deputies of the Brazilian state of Sergipe.

== Family ==
Rogério Carvalho is married with Ivana Feliz also a physician and they have two daughters: Julia and Raquel. He resides in Aracaju.
