= Nise Yamaguchi =

Researcher, Brazilian physician

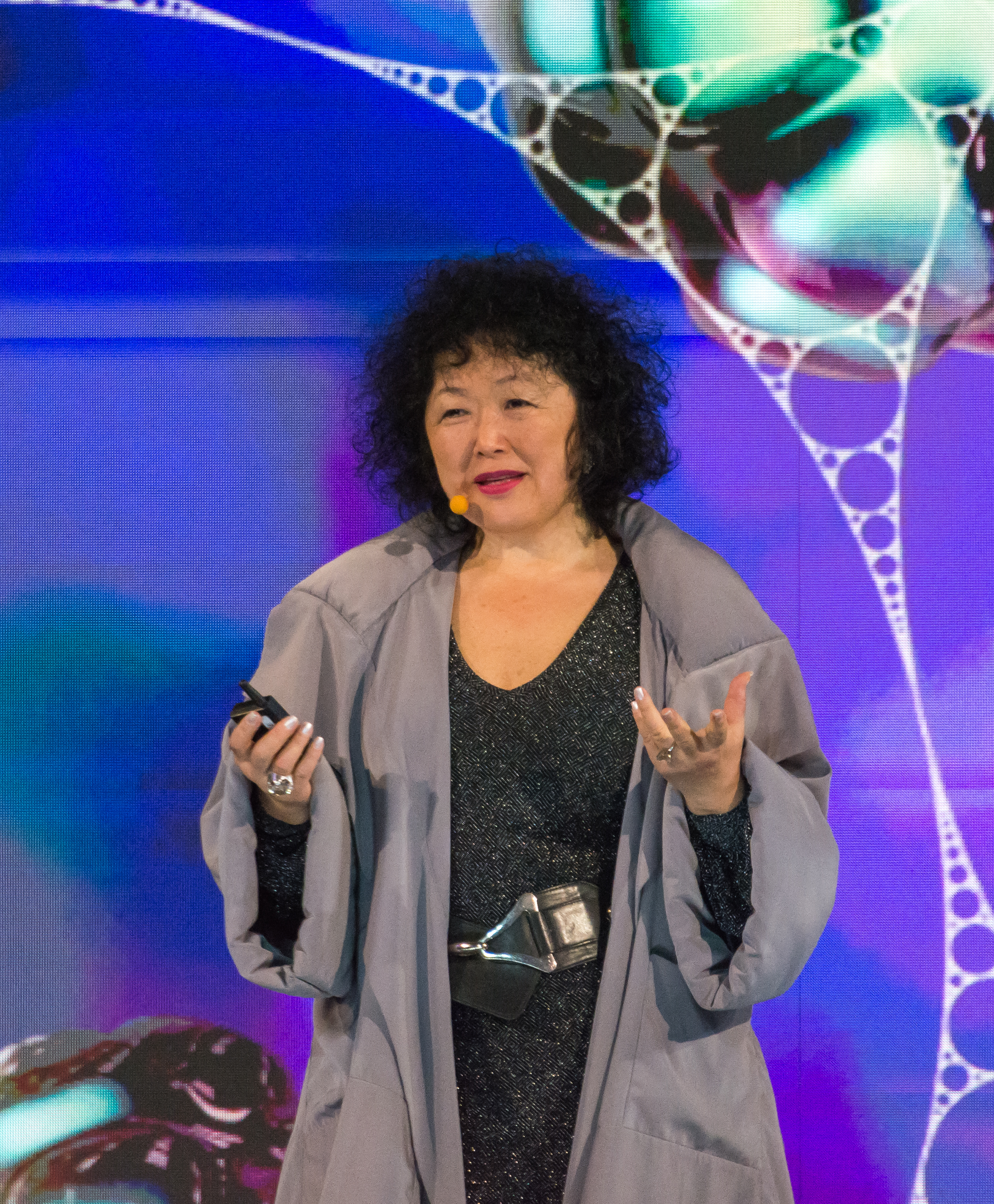
- Born: Nise Hitomi Yamaguchi; May 6, 1959 (age 67); Maringá, Paraná, Brazil
- Education: University of São Paulo (MBBS) Master Degree in Immunology PhD in Clinical Medicine with Molecular Biology in conjunction with the MD Anderson Cancer Center labs.
- Known for: World Tobacco Control, Personalized Medicine, Immunology and Pandemics, Early treatments
- Medical career
- Field: Oncology and immunology
- Institutions: Integrated Advances in Medicine (IAM) and International Nise Yamaguchi Foundation

Nise Hitomi Yamaguchi (Maringá, May 6, 1959) is a Brazilian physician and immunologist. She has a master's degree in immunology and a doctorate in oncology clinical medicine, and is an international speaker for matters of health. As a scientist, her areas of research are personalized medicine, translational research in oncology, and immunology. She utilizes knowledge of genetics, epigenetics, and omics to understand and treat many diseases, including cancer. As of April 2022, she is not affiliated with any political party.

== Professional career ==
Yamaguchi graduated with a degree in medicine from the Faculty of Medicine of the University of São Paulo in 1982 and completed her residency in clinical medicine in immunology and allergies at the Hospital das Clínicas da Universidade de São Paulo (HCFMUSP) in 1988.

During her studies, she took courses in Germany and Switzerland on the humanistic view of patients and their families. She also participated in training in New York City with scientists at the Memorial Sloan Kettering Cancer Center. While at the Cancer Center, she studied tumour immunology and went on to defend her master's thesis in immunology at HCFMUSP in 1993. Yamaguchi completed her doctoral thesis in conjunction with translational labs at the MD Anderson Cancer Center in Houston, United States. She is board certified in clinical oncology and immunology by the Brazilian Medical Association and in Oncology by the European Society of Medical Oncology.

== Recognition ==
Dr. Yamaguchi became known internationally for her strong activity to approve the WHO-supported Framework Convention for Tobacco Control, which ended up in Brazil adopting an indoor tobacco-free environment and many other regulations to prevent cancer and protect people of non-communicable chronic degenerative diseases. She participated in international forums for tobacco cessation with members of the European Parliament in Austria.

As an immunologist with previous experience in public health, Dr. Yamaguchi participated in many conferences about diagnosis, early treatments (including the controversial protocols which included the administration of hydroxychloroquine), and vaccines throughout the COVID-19 pandemic. She was mentioned as a possible successor to the then Minister of Health Luiz Henrique Mandetta, and defended support measures and early treatments for COVID-19. She has always denied that she would be appointed to the Health Ministry, although there was always some speculation every time there was a change there.

Dr. Yamaguchi has served in governments of different political backgrounds. Her work has addressed diversity, equality, and inclusion in the prevention and health quality of life issues, with a strong commitment to access of right and timely basis treatments, especially in cancer and non-communicable chronic diseases for low- and middle-income populations throughout the world. During the AIDS and H1N1 epidemics, she served as an immunologist and clinical advisor to different governments. She is also devoted to the issue of governance in public affairs and works as a volunteer with a group which she helped create led by Dr. Nelson Teich, about governance in health provision by the public and private domains.

Her current work is as a clinician, as the director of the Institute of Advances in Medicine in Brazil; and as a physician, taking care of her patients in different hospitals, including the Hospital Albert Einstein.

Awards given to Dr. Yamaguchi include the recognition of the Brazilian Cancer Institute for her activities against tobacco; the Jimmie Holland Award by the Brazilian Society of Psycho-Oncology; the Joseph Cullen Award from the International Association for Lung Cancer Studies; the Mario Kroeff Medal from the Brazilian Cancer Society; the recognition of the lifelong achievements by the World Prevention Alliance in Lyon; and International Prevention and Research Institute.

Dr. Yamaguchi has written a book named The Human being facing cancer and the will to cure, nominated for the Jabuti Prize, and is in the second edition by UNESP editors. She participated in the organization of two books by the International Prevention and Research Institute (World Cancer and Breast Cancer).

During the COVID-19 pandemic in Brazil, she allegedly took part in a shadow cabinet to advise then president Jair Bolsonaro, advocating for the use of hydroxychloroquine and other drugs without proven efficacy in early-stage Covid-19 cases, as well as for the easing of the social distancing measures in order to accelerate herd immunity, which she and other doctors thought would end the pandemic.

== Controversies ==
Comparing COVID-19 pandemic fears to Holocaust

Yamaguchi was suspended by Albert Einstein's Israelite Hospital after making controversial and offensive remarks about the Holocaust on a TV show "Impressoes" on July 5, 2020. Yamaguchi said

“Fear is harmful to everything,” Yamaguchi said. “First, it paralyzes you. It makes you easy to manipulate. Anyone. Do you think that a few Nazi soldiers would be able to control the hungry Jewish herd if they did not subject them to that daily humiliation?”

The suspension drew massive media coverage in Brazil, drawing a public response from Sidney Klajner, the hospital's president, to the media: "Yamaguchi’s remarks were “unfortunate and an unfounded analogy. The Holocaust is an extremely important moment for us, where 6 million Jews were killed, and many survivors contributed to the foundation of our hospital.”

The Sao Paulo Jewish federation also condemned Yamaguchi, saying her remarks “minimize the horrors of Nazism and offend the memory of victims, survivors and their families.”

Yamaguchi apologized on Sunday, saying her comments were not anti-Semitic, paying tribute to her late Jewish mentor, and recalling her support for her sister’s conversion to Judaism.

== Bibliography ==
- Casarões, Guilherme; Magalhães, David (2021). "A aliança da hidroxicloroquina: como líderes de extrema direita e pregadores da ciência alternativa se reuniram para promover uma droga milagrosa". Revista de Administração Pública. 55 (1): 197–214. ISSN 1981-7746.
- Morel, Ana Paula Massadar (2021). "Negacionismo da Covid-19 e educação popular em saúde: para além da necropolítica". Trabalho, Educação e Saúde. 19 e00315147. doi:10.1590/1981-7746-sol00315. ISSN 1981-7746. S2CID 234164438.
- Nigri, Kátia Kac (2021). "A repercussão pública da guerra discursiva na pandemia da Covid-19" (PDF). ASEPHallus. XV (19): 47–70. ISSN 1809-709X.
- Pereira, Marcus Vinicius de Souza. "Desinformação e genocídio: a atuação do Estado brasileiro na produção da desordem da informação na pandemia da Covid-19" (PDF). IX SEMINÁRIO DE PESQUISA FESPSP – "Desafios da pandemia: Agendas para as Ciências Sociais Aplicadas". Fundação Escola de Sociologia e Política de São Paulo.
- Sacramento, Igor; Santos, Allan; Abib, Roberto (2020). "A saúde na era na testemunha: experiência e evidência na defesa da hidroxicloroquina". Revista Comunicação, Cultura e Sociedade. 7 (1): 003–023. doi:10.30681/rccs.v7i1.5087 (inactive 8 November 2026). ISSN 2317-7519.
- Santos, Tania Coelho dos (2019). "Versões contraditórias no campo da ciência: politização e desinformação na prevenção à Covid-19" (PDF). Revista Asephallus de Orientação Lacaniana. XV (19). aSEPHallus: 6–22. doi:10.17852/1809-709x.2020v15n29p06-22. ISSN 1809-709X. S2CID 243208757.
- "Teich deixa o Ministério da Saúde antes de completar um mês no cargo e após divergir de Bolsonaro". G1 (in Brazilian Portuguese). 15 May 2020.
