= Luis Miranda (Brazilian politician) =

Brazilian politician (born 1980)

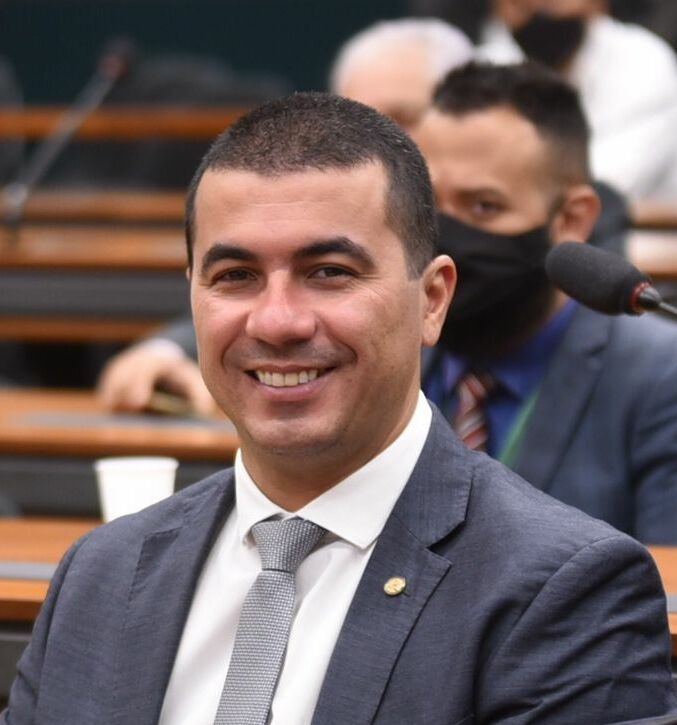
- Miranda in 2022

Member of the Chamber of Deputies
- In office 1 February 2019 – 31 January 2023
- Constituency: Federal District

Personal details
- Born: 27 March 1980 (age 46)
- Party: Republicans (since 2022)

Luis Claudio Fernandes Miranda (born 27 March 1980) is a Brazilian politician who was a member of the Chamber of Deputies from 2019 to 2023. He has been a member of the Republicans since 2022.
