= Eliziane Gama =

Brazilian journalist and politician

Senator for Maranhão
- Incumbent
- Assumed office 1 February 2019

Federal Deputy
- In office 1 February 2015 – 1 February 2019
- Constituency: Maranhão

State Deputy of Maranhão
- In office 1 February 2007 – 1 February 2015
- Constituency: At-large

Personal details
- Born: Eliziane Pereira Gama; 27 February 1977 (age 49) Monção, Maranhão, Brazil
- Party: PT (2026–present)
- Other political affiliations: PPS (2001–2015); REDE (2015–2016); Cidadania (2016–2023); PSD (2023–2026)
- Profession: Journalist

Eliziane Pereira Gama Melo (born 27 February 1977) is a Brazilian journalist and politician. She was a state deputy in the Legislative Assembly of Maranhão from 2007 to 2015 and federal deputy from 2015 to 2019. Since 2019, Gama has served as a Senator for the state of Maranhão.
