= Randolfe Rodrigues =

Brazilian journalist and politician (born 1972)

Senator for Amapá
- Incumbent
- Assumed office 1 February 2011

Member of the Legislative Assembly of Amapá
- In office 1 January 1999 – 1 January 2007
- Constituency: At-large

Personal details
- Born: 6 November 1972 (age 53) Garanhuns, Pernambuco, Brazil
- Party: PT (2024–present)
- Other political affiliations: PT (1990–2005); PSOL (2005–2015); REDE (2015–2023)
- Spouse: Priscila Barbosa (m. 2023)
- Occupation: Journalist and history teacher
- Website: www.randolferodrigues.com.br

Randolph Frederich Rodrigues Alves (Brazilian Portuguese pronunciation: [ʁɐ̃ˈdowfi ʁoˈdɾiɡes]; born 6 November 1972) is a Brazilian journalist and politician. Since 2011, Rodrigues serves as a Senator for the state of Amapá, was the most voted in the state's history in the 2010 Elections.

He was opposed to Dilma Rousseff's impeachment process and defended that Vice-President Michel Temer would also have to be removed should it pass, proposing new presidential elections. In the 2018 elections, he was re-elected senator, and became the leader of the opposition to the Bolsonaro government that lasted from 2019 to 2022.

Federal Senate
Preceded by Humberto Costa	Senate Minority Leader; 2019–2021	Succeeded by Jean-Paul Prates
Position established	Senate Opposition Leader; 2021–2023	Succeeded by Rogério Marinho
Brazilian National Congress
Preceded by Eduardo Gomes	Congress Government Leader; 2023–present	Incumbent
