= Serviço de Atendimento Móvel de Urgência =

Urgency healthcare in Brazil

Urgent Mobile Care Service
- Serviço de Atendimento Móvel de Urgência
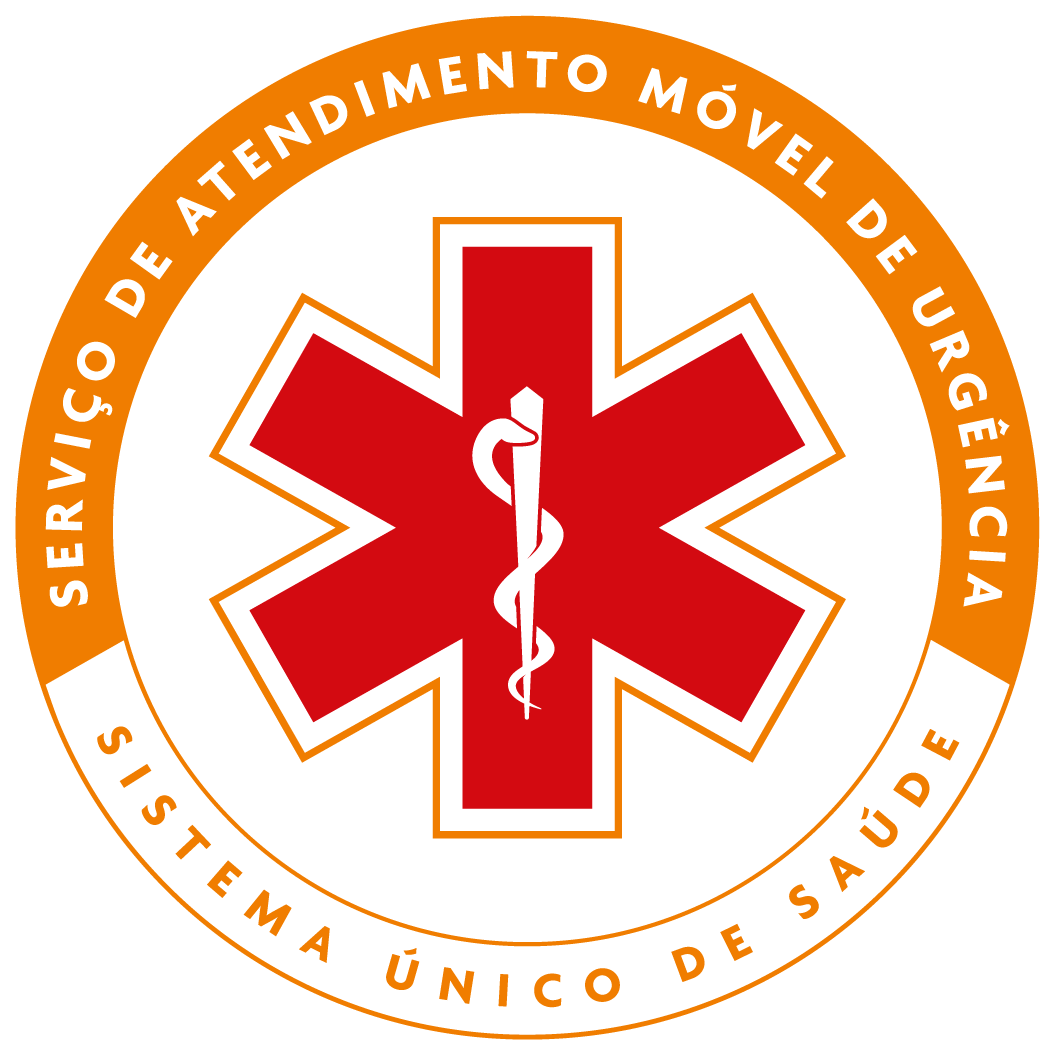
- Branding used to identify the SAMU

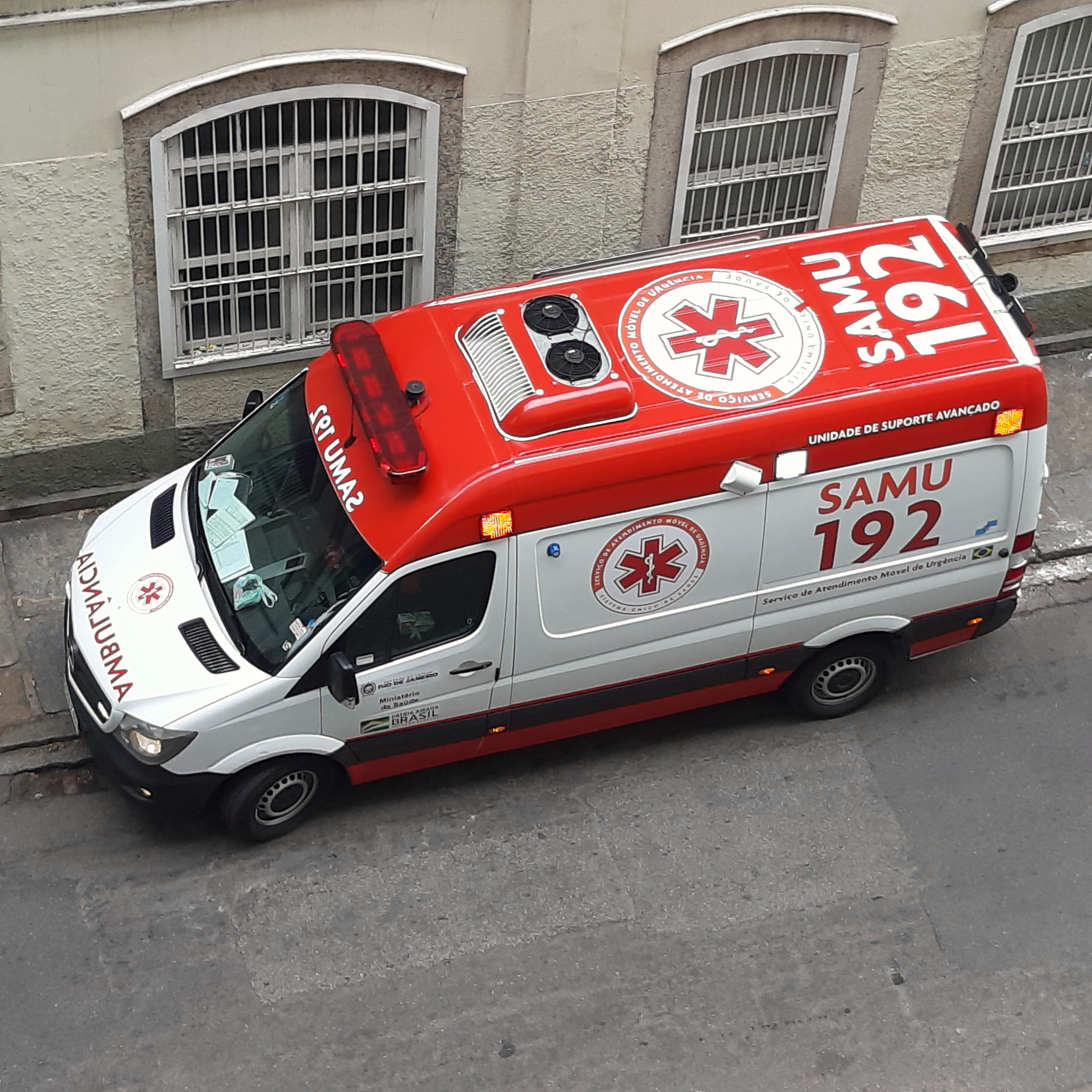
- Ambulance with SAMU branding
- Nickname: SAMU, SAMU-192
- Named after: Service d'Aide Médicale Urgente (SAMU) of France
- Formation: 27 April 2004; 21 years ago
- Location: Brazil
- Official language: Brazilian Portuguese, Guarani
- Parent organization: Ministério da Saúde (Brazilian Ministry of Health)
- Website: gov.br/saude/pt-br/composicao/saes/samu-192

Serviço de Atendimento Móvel de Urgência (SAMU or SAMU 192; lit. 'Urgent Mobile Care Service') is Brazil's public national pre-hospital mobile care service. The service is provided free of charge under Brazil's Unified Health System (SUS) and is available 24 hours a day via the dedicated emergency number 192.

In June 2025, SAMU reportedly had a fleet of over 4,300 ambulances, servicing about 188 million people in 4,143 Brazilian municipalities (out of 5,500; around 75% city coverage).

== History ==
SAMU was instituted nationally via Decree #5,055 on 27 April 2004, by then-president Luiz Inácio Lula da Silva. The same decree also guaranteed that the phone number "192" would be reserved for exclusive use by the service.

== Operation ==
=== Funding ===
SAMU's funding is shared between the federal, state and municipal governments. The federal government is meant to give states and municipalities funds corresponding to 50% of the service's budget, and the recipients are expected to cover for the rest, though this balance is not always kept.

=== Organization ===
SAMU is split into two divisions: the regulation division, via the Central Médica de Regulação (lit. 'Medical Regulation Center'), and the assistance division, which makes use of the ambulances.

The regulation division receives distress phone calls to the 192 number, identifies the patient and where they're located, and transfers treatment to a medical professional. This doctor will, if possible, handle the patient's needs on call; however, if necessary, they will request action by the assistance division. The assistance division is responsible for bringing in person care to patients, using whatever vehicle is more suited for the situation.

=== Vehicles ===
SAMU has a wide range of vehicles available, either stationed on the Medical Regulation Center or, in some cases, in decentralized bases.

There are three different types of traditional ambulances: Unidades de Suporte Básico (USB; lit. 'Basic Support Units'), Unidades de Suporte Intermediário (USI; lit. 'Intermediate Support Units') and Unidades de Suporte Avançado (USA; lit. 'Advanced Support Units'). These are selected according to the complexity of the situation; USB's are suited for lower complexity situations, through USA's, reserved for more serious cases. USA's are similar in capabilities to an ICU.

Ambulance motorcycles, nicknamed "motolâncias" (portmanteau of motocicleta + ambulância), are also available and equipped similarly to USB's; they are used where access by traditional ambulances is difficult.

Additionally, in situations in which terrestrial access is not an option, boat ambulances ("ambulanchas"; portmanteau of ambulância + lancha), helicopters or airplanes may be used.

In July 2023, the monthly cost of USB's was reportedly R$17 thousand (approx. US$3 thousand); of USA's, R$50 thousand (approx. US$9 thousand); and of motolâncias, R$9 thousand (approx. US$2 thousand).

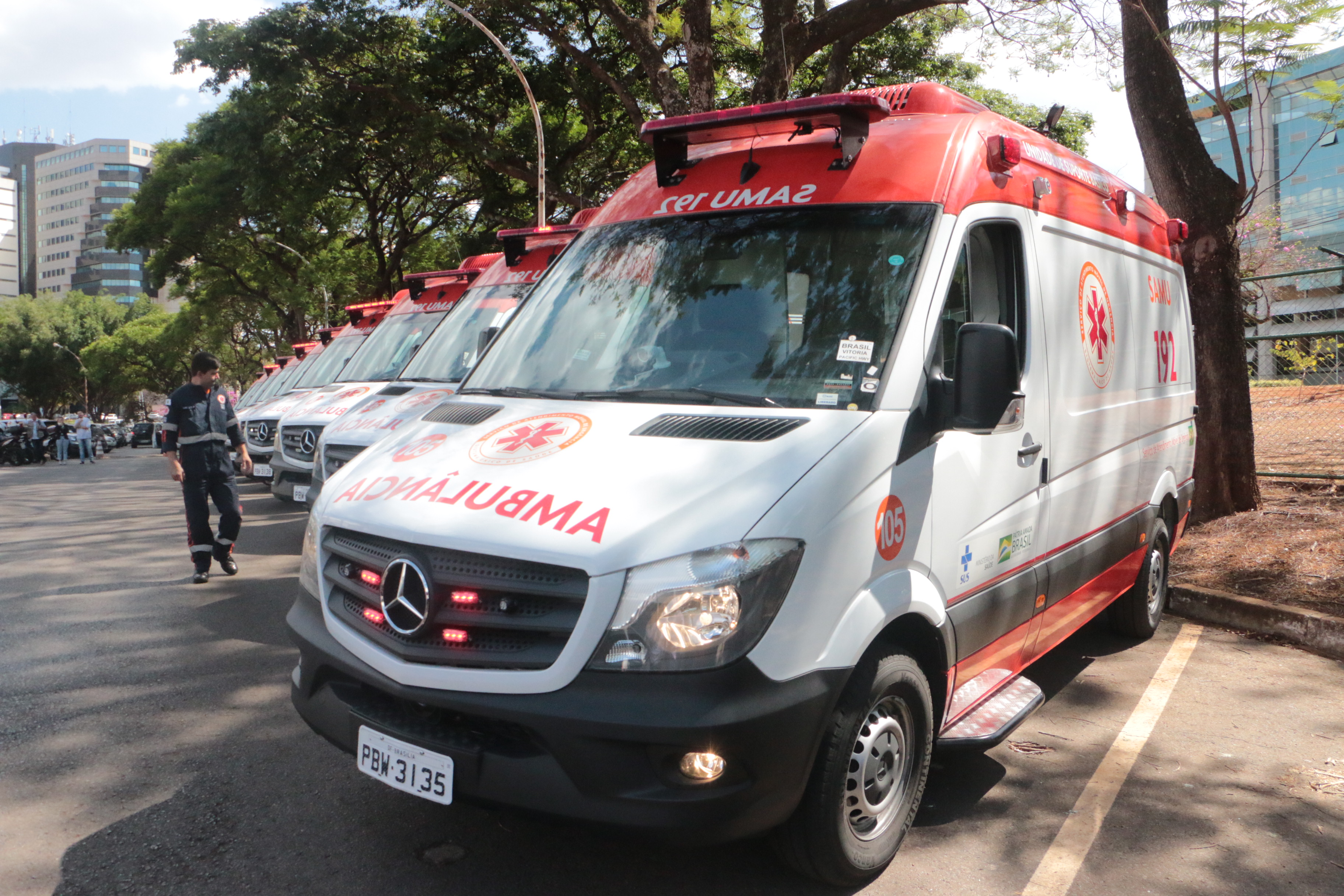
Basic Support Units (USB)

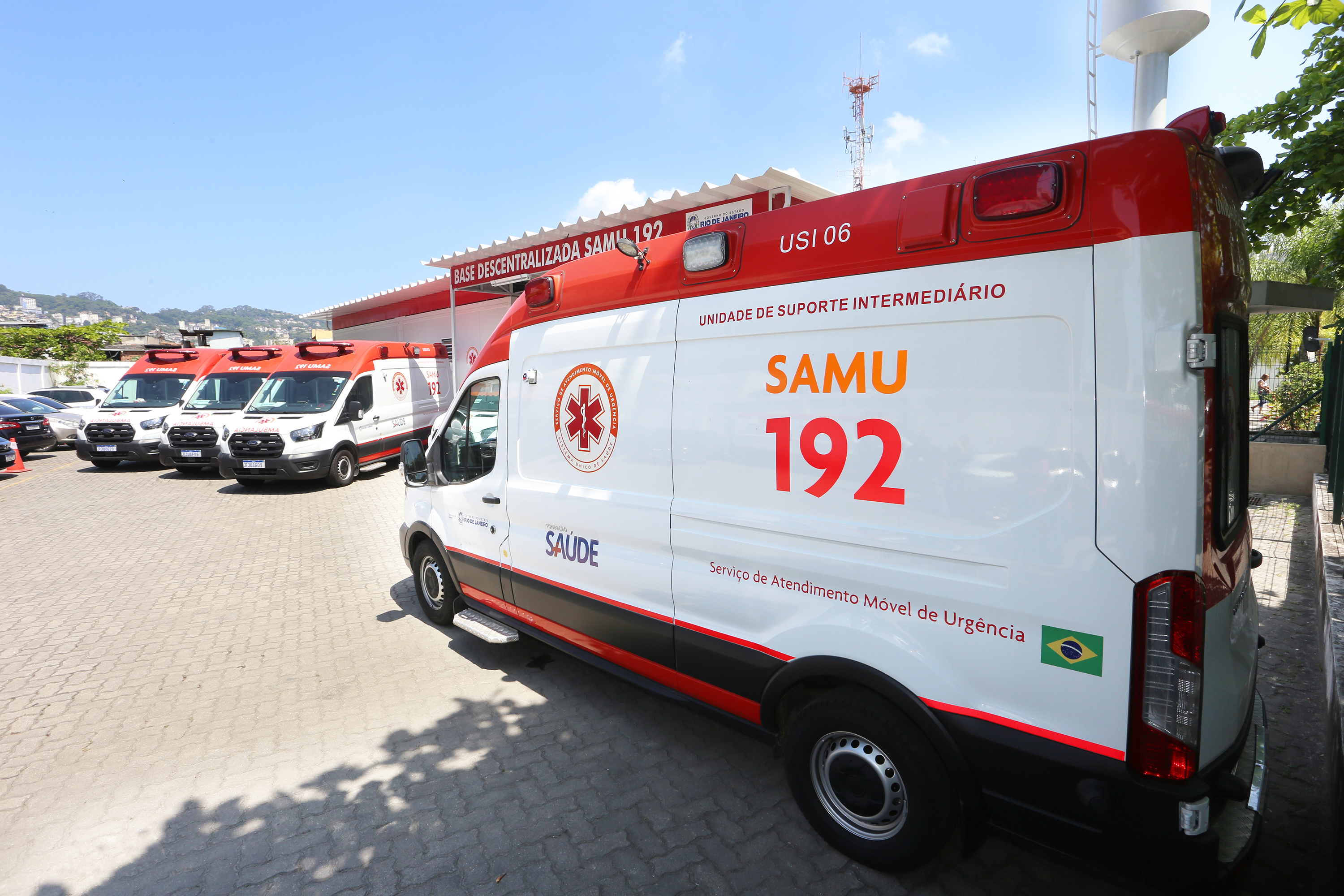
Intermediate Support Units (USI)

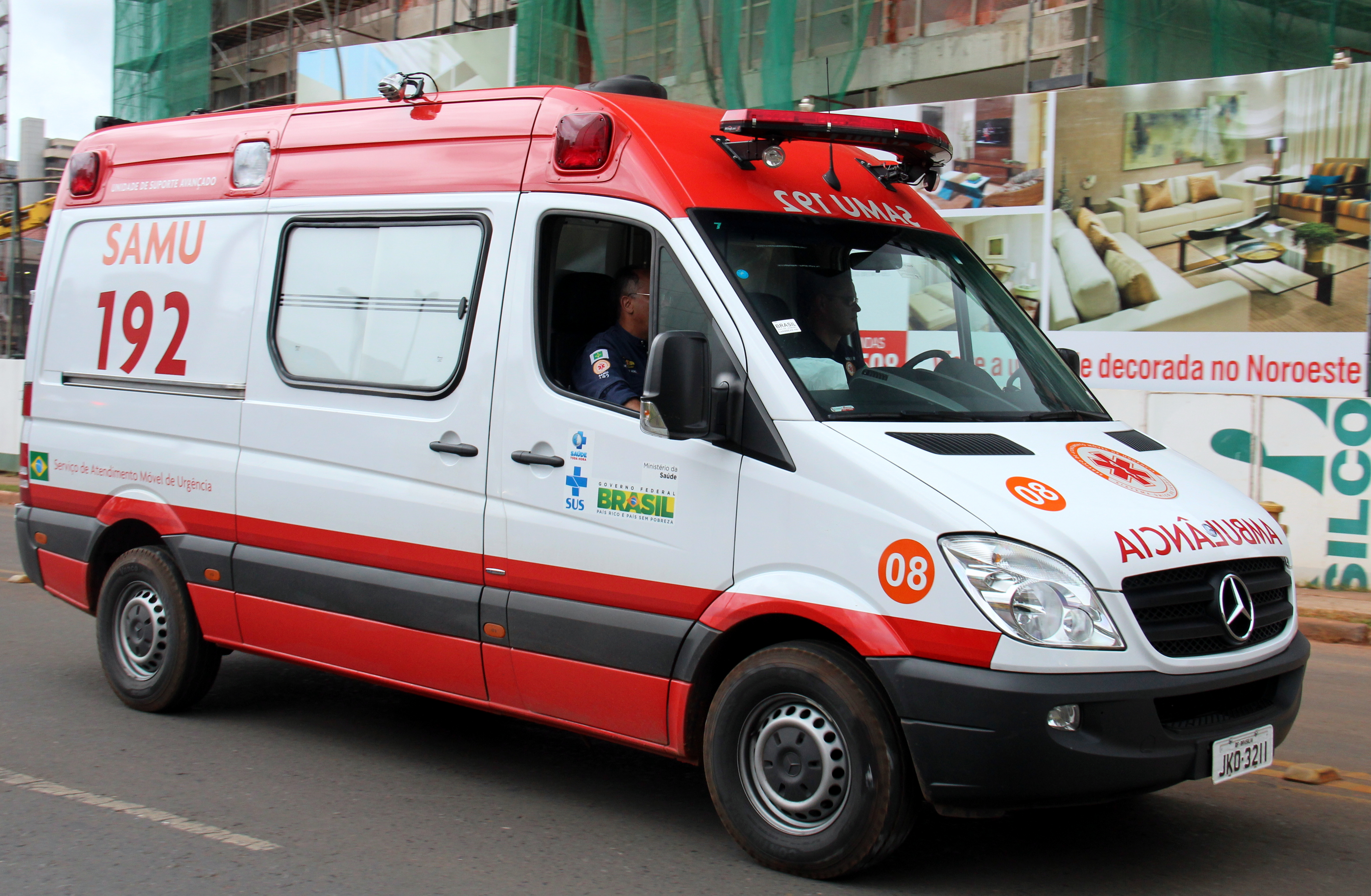
Advanced Support Unit (USA)

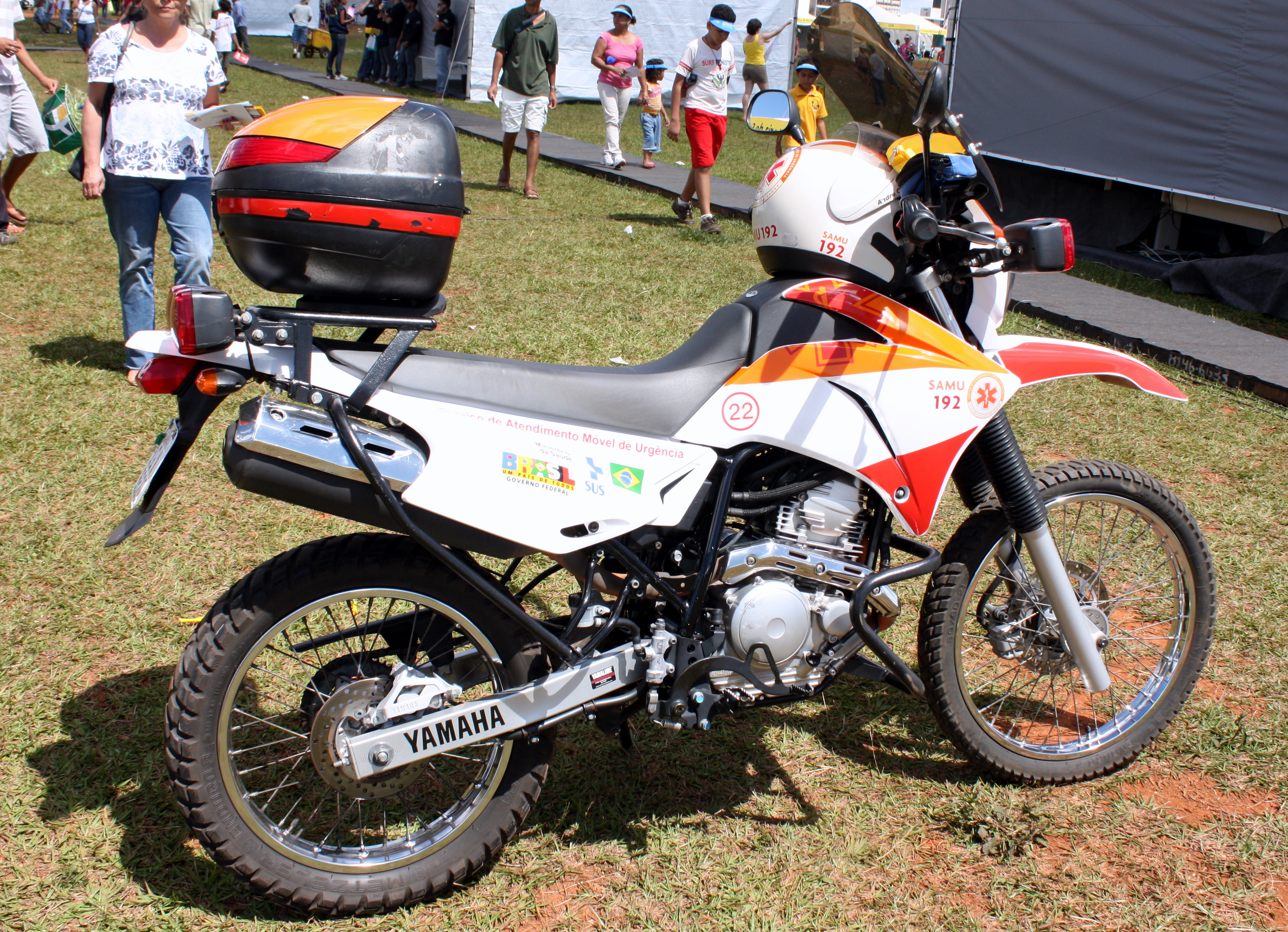
An ambulance motorcycle (motolância)

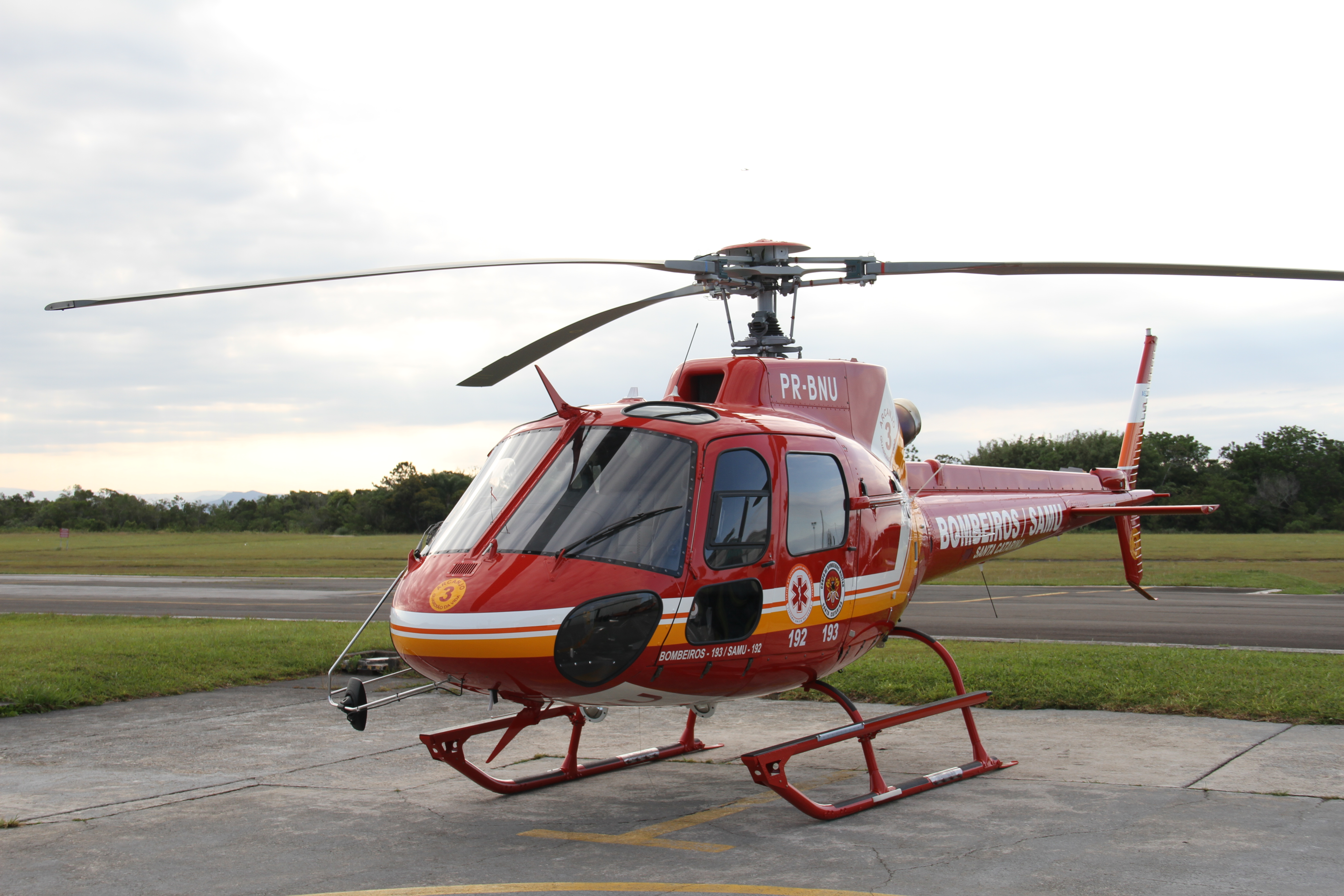
Rescue helicopter for both SAMU and the Firefighters Corps

== SAMUI ==
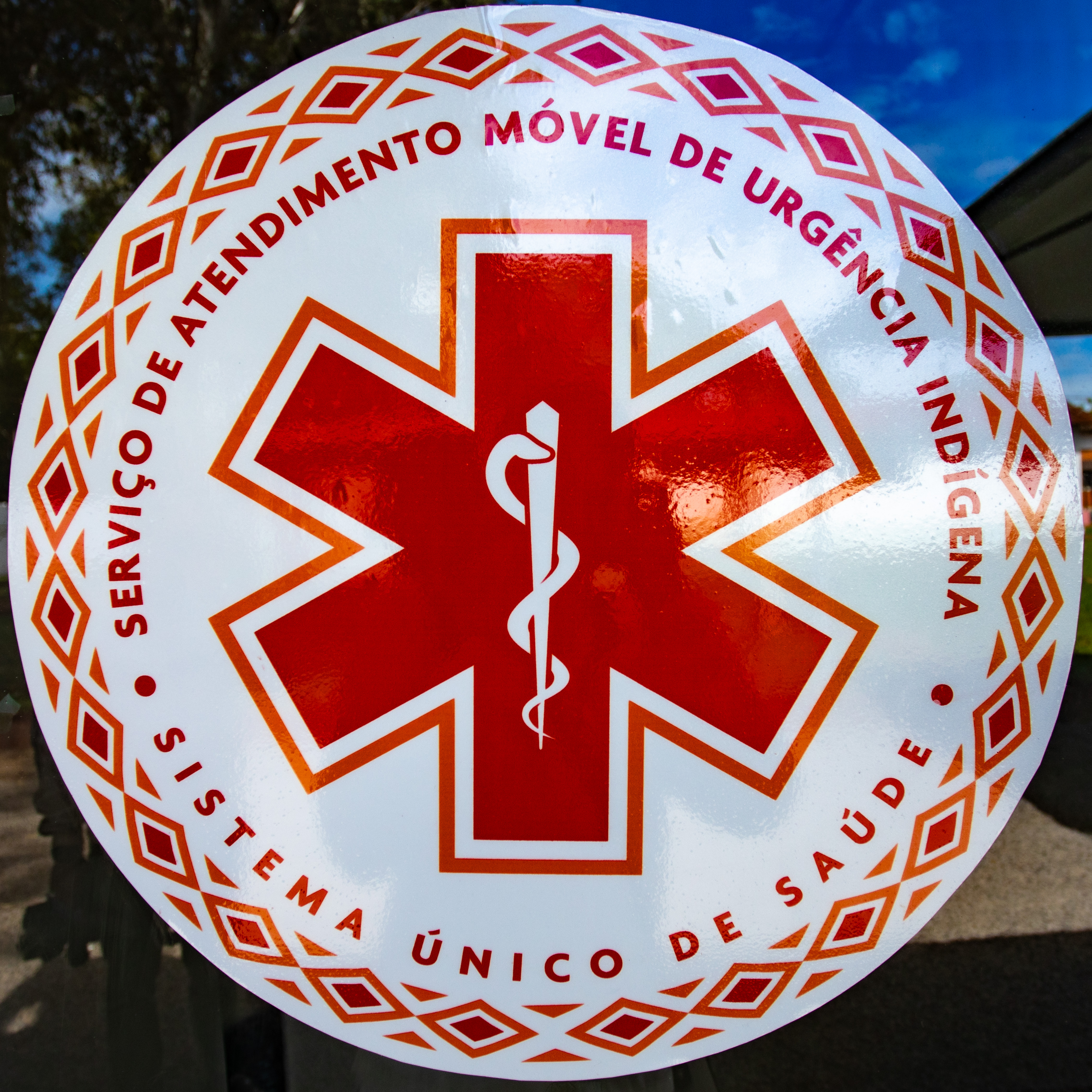
Modified SAMU branding representing the SAMUI

In August 2025, the Federal Government launched the first Serviço de Atendimento Móvel de Urgência Indígena (SAMUI; lit. 'Indigenous Urgent Mobile Care Service') in an indigenous nature reserve in Dourados, Mato Grosso do Sul. SAMUI is expected to assist 25 thousand indigenous people, and is starting with a team of 14 health professionals – consisting of five nursing technicians, five nurses and four driver-rescuers – half of which speak Guarani. SAMUI will reportedly have an annual budget of R$341 thousand (approx. US$63 thousand).

Alexandre Padilha
(@padilhando)
tweeted:

Portuguese:

HISTÓRICO: Inauguramos hoje o PRIMEIRO SAMU INDÍGENA DO BRASIL em Dourados - Mato Grosso do Sul! O SAMUI vai atender 25 mil indígenas das etnias Guarani, Kaiowá e Terena, com profissionais de saúde fluentes em Guarani! É o governo Lula cuidando dos nossos povos indígenas!

Translation:

HISTORIC: We inaugurated today BRAZIL'S FIRST INDIGENOUS SAMU in Dourados - Mato Grosso do Sul! The SAMUI will cover 25 thousand indigenous people from Guarani, Kaiowá and Terena ethnicities, with health professionals that are fluent in Guarani! That's Lula's government taking care of our indigenous peoples!

9 Aug 2025

== See also ==
- Healthcare in Brazil
- Sistema Único de Saúde
