= Brazilian traditional medicine =

Traditional medical practices in Brazil

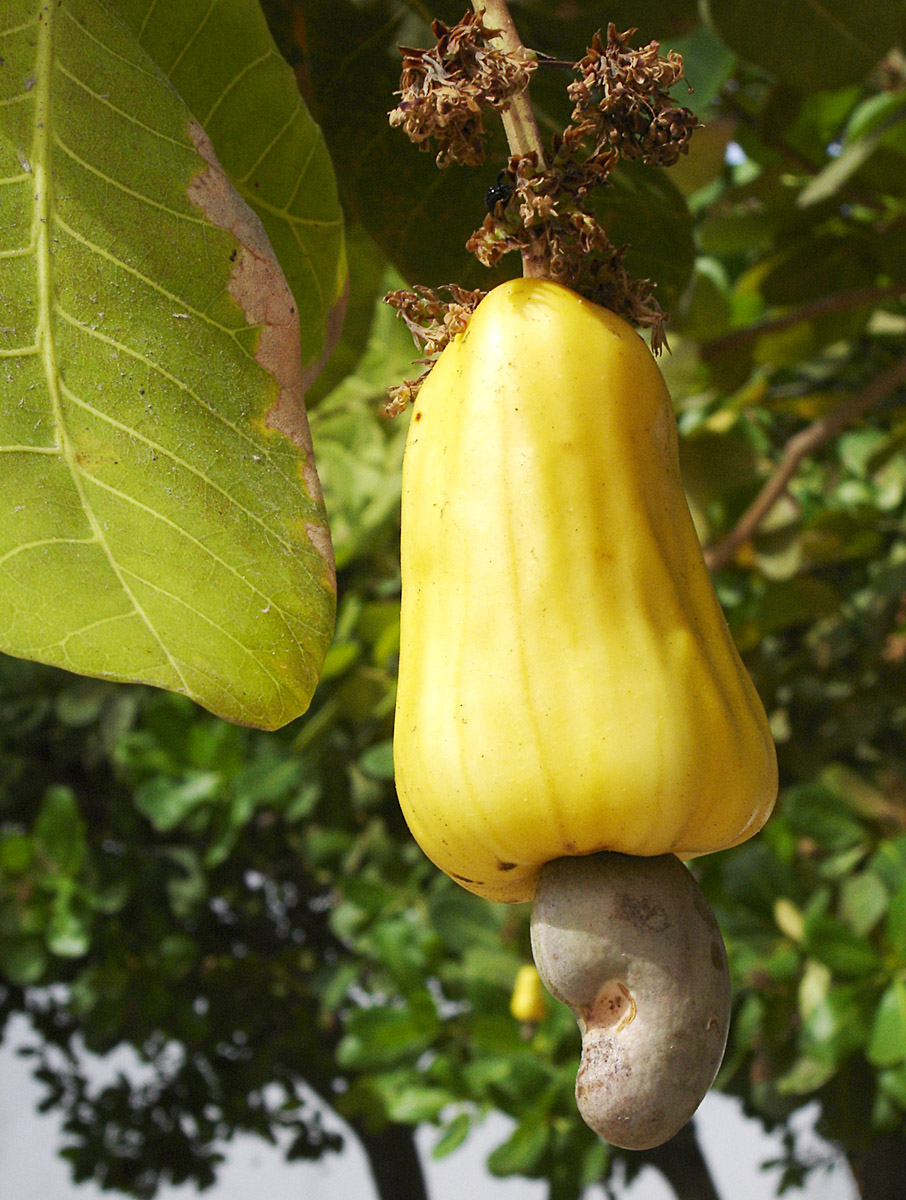
Several parts of the cashew plant, including the bark and seeds, are used medicinally.

Traditional Brazilian medicine (Portuguese: Medicina indígena) includes many native South American elements, and imported African ones. It is predominantly used in areas where indigenous groups and African descendants reside, like in the northeast coast, nearly all interior regions including Amazon regions, savannahs, rainforest, foothills, and Pantanal. According to Romulo R. N. Alves, "although Brazil's health system is public...use of traditional remedies and rituals provide an economical way of healing for much of the populace, but that also does not mean that wealthy Brazilians don't seek it out as well. Traditional medicine is a deep part of Brazilian heritage."

The Aruak, Tupi, Yamomami, Krahô, Guarani and other Indians groups are among the native tribes that together with isolated descendants of Africans or Quilombola, and Indians integrated (Caboclo) that are known to almost exclusively practice traditional medicine. Among the plants include edible foods like the cashew, peppers, mangosteen and coconut, but often include inedible parts like the fruits, leaves, husk, bark. Neighboring nations like the Patamona of Guyana also use the cashew.

There is growing interest in Brazilian medicine as the Amazon rainforest is the largest tropical forest in the world, and is home to immense biodiversity, including cures or treatments for many ailments. Japanese scientists have found strong anticancer activity in Brazilian traditional remedies. In one study in 1997 published in The American Journal of Chinese Medicine, only 122 species existing in Brazil could be related to the Chinese species (or 14.35% of the samples), which means the vast majority of species are not known to Chinese traditional medicine. Thousands of species remain unstudied and/or susceptible to extinction by habitat destruction.

== Examples ==
Examples include psychoactive plants like Ayahuasca Epena and Jurema used in rituals currently being investigated for their potential use in psychiatry.

The Kambo cleanse is a practice that uses a secretion from the giant leaf frog used by indigenous groups, such as the Noke Kuin, that is injected into the bloodstream and used in traditional medicine to ward off bad luck. Multiple patents are pending for its use against ischemia and hepatic injury.

The Free Radicals and Oxidative Stress Group at the UPV/EHU's Faculty of Medicine and Nursing at the University of the Basque Country has published a study where traditionally infused Vismia baccifera has shown massive induction of oxidative stress in kidney cancer cells, with rapid death, but leaving healthy cells alone.

== See also ==
- Health in Brazil
- Healthcare in Brazil
- Herbalism
- Indigenous peoples in Brazil
- List of plants of Amazon Rainforest vegetation of Brazil
- Pharmacognosy
- Shamanism
- Traditional medicine
- Tropical medicine
