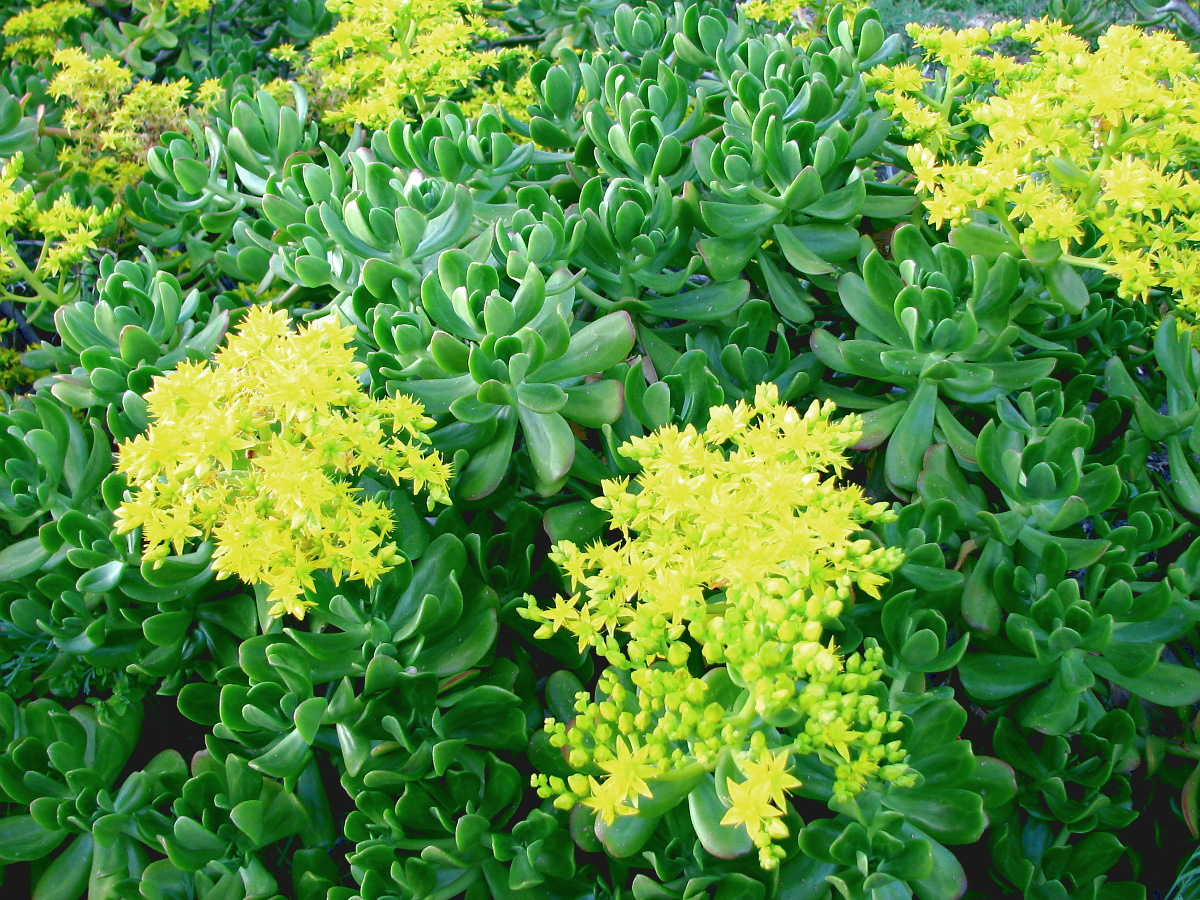

Scientific classification
- Kingdom: Plantae
- Clade: Embryophytes
- Clade: Tracheophytes
- Clade: Angiosperms
- Clade: Eudicots
- Order: Saxifragales
- Family: Crassulaceae
- Genus: Sedum
- Species: S. praealtum

Binomial name
- Sedum praealtum DC

= Sedum praealtum =

Species of succulent

Sedum praealtum, also known as shrubby stonecrop or green cockscomb, is a small, woody succulent shrub in the stonecrop family that is native to Mexico.

== Description ==
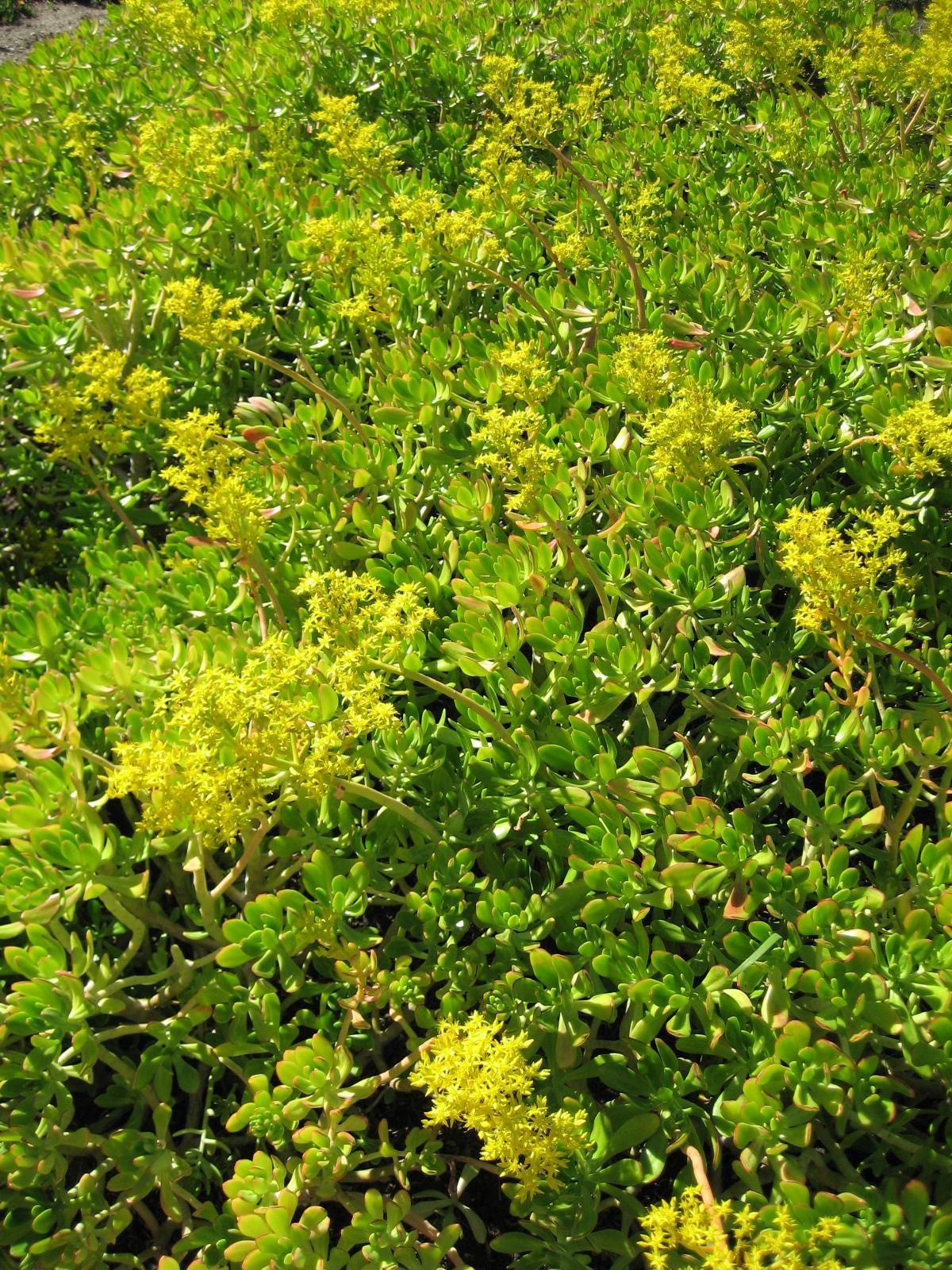
A clumping subshrub

It features sub-woody brown or grayish stems and fleshy, hairless leaves. It grows to 3 feet tall (90cm) and spreads to 4 feet (1.2m). The lime-green leaves are spatulated and are 1.5 inches (3.8cm) long, arranged in rosettes. Large clusters of bright, star-like yellow flowers appear from late winter to spring. The plant tends to be summer-dormant.

It is closely related to Sedum dendroideum and would look similar to it, but 'dendroideum' can be differentiated by the existence of a line of subepidermal glands on its margins near the leaf tips.

== Cultivation ==
It can be used as a bonsai due to its treelike appearance and it bears a resemblance to the Jade plant. It easily grows in rock gardens in well-drained, poor soils. Propagation can easily be done by cuttings and the plant is not cold hardy.

== Uses ==
A spermicide developed from this plant, that helps women control birth rates without any major side effects, was around 20% more effective than nonoxynol-9. Its leaf substance has been traditionally used for burns, hemorrhoids and dysentery, gum inflammation, and as well as an eye drop for conjunctivitis and irritations.
