= Chun-Su Yuan =

Chun-Su Yuan (Chinese: 袁钧苏) is a physician scientist. Yuan is the Cyrus Tang Professor at the Pritzker School of Medicine, University of Chicago. He has over 350 peer-reviewed publications, 8 medical books, and over 30 U.S. and international patents. Yuan also serves as an advisor for government agencies, pharmaceutical companies, and law firms.

Yuan’s group, in the Department of Anesthesia & Critical Care at the University of Chicago, performed pre-clinical studies and clinical trials in developing a novel compound, methylnaltrexone (MTNX), for opioid bowel dysfunction. The University of Chicago licensed MTNX to Progenics Pharmaceuticals in 2001. In 2005, Progenics and Wyeth Pharmaceuticals entered a methylnaltrexone joint development for opioid-induced side effects. In 2008, the Food and Drug Administration (FDA) approved methylnaltrexone (Relistor®) for opioid-induced constipation in advanced illness patients. In 2014, the FDA approved the Relistor subcutaneous injection for the treatment of opioid-induced constipation in patients with chronic non-cancer pain. In 2016, the FDA approved the Relistor oral tablets for the treatment of opioid-induced constipation in adults with chronic non-cancer pain. Currently, this drug is approved for use in over 60 countries worldwide, including those of European Union, Canada, Australia and Brazil. The drug’s additional indications and formulations are under further development.

Yuan is the Director of the Tang Center for Herbal Medicine Research at the University of Chicago. The Tang Center investigates efficacy and safety of medicinal herbs and other dietary supplements supported by worldwide collaborations. The center also identifies novel compounds from botanicals and introduces herbal formulations through proprietary techniques and standardized procedures. Yuan is also the Editor-in-Chief of the American Journal of Chinese Medicine, the oldest complementary and integrative medicine journal in the U.S.
