= Health in Brazil =

General vision of health of population in Brazil

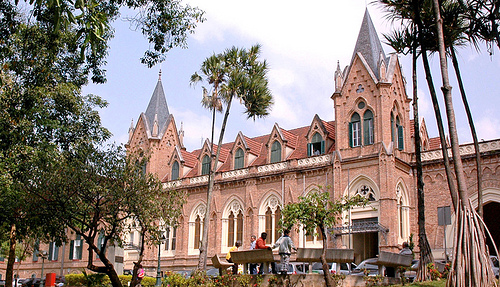
Central Hospital of the Santa Casa da Misericórdia in São Paulo, a catholic philanthropic institution offering free services through the SUS.

The fundaments of the Brazilian Unified Health System (SUS) were established in the Brazilian Constitution of 1988, under the principles of universality, integrality and equity. It has a decentralized operational and management system, and social participation is present in all administrative levels. The Brazilian health system is a complex composition of public sector (SUS), private health institutions and private insurances. Since the creation of SUS, Brazil has significantly improved in many health indicators, but a lot needs to be done in order to achieve Universal Health Coverage (UHC).

The Human Rights Measurement Initiative finds that Brazil is doing 93.3% of what should be possible at its level of income for the right to health.

== Health situation in Brazil ==
Health indicators and relative change over time in Brazil
Health Indicators	1990	2019 (or latest data available)	Relative Change
Life expectancy at birth	66.3	76.6	16%
Child mortality rate (newborns who die before reaching 5 years)	6.29%	1.39%	-78%
Maternal Mortality Ratio (pregnancy related deaths per 100,000 live births/year)	104	44 (2015)	-58%
Death rates from suicide (suicide deaths per 100,000 individuals/year)	7.16	6.09 (2017)	-15%
Death rates from cancer (deaths from all cancers per 100,000 individuals/year)	121.63	109.58 (2017)	-10%
Share of premature deaths attributed to tobacco smoking	15.92 %	12.43% (2017)	-22%
Share of deaths caused by interpersonal violence	4.45%	4.67%	5%
Share of adults who are obese	10.20%	22.10% (2016)	117%
Number of new HIV cases	25.954	83.333 (2017)	221%
Death rates from malaria ( per 100,000 individuals/year)	0.43	0.03 (2017)	-94%

Total disease burden by cause and relative change over time in Brazil
Total disease burden by cause (in million DALYs lost/year)	1990	2017	Relative Change
Injuries	7.83	9.06	16%
Communicable, maternal, neonatal, and nutritional diseases	20.45	8.4	-58%
Non-communicable diseases (NCDs)	29.11	40.03	37%

- Mortality by non-transmissible illness: 16.6% as of 2016. Of this 65.7 deaths per 100,000 inhabitants is caused by heart and circulatory diseases, along with 26.7 deaths per 100,000 inhabitants is caused by cancer.
- Mortality caused by external causes (transportation, violence and suicide): 55.7 deaths per 100,000 inhabitants (10.9% of all deaths in the country), reaching 62.3 deaths in the southeast region.

Brazil has reduced the malaria incidence by over 56%in the past decade compared to the year 2000, but yet it is the country in the region of the americas with the highest number of cases.

Dengue is found in all the states of the country, with 4 viral stereotypes. Reported cases: 1.649.008 (2014).

In 2014 occurred the introduction of the Chikungunya fever virus in the country, and in 2015 the Zika virus, which are transmitted by Aedes aegypti. The vector is being faced with the strategy of Integrated Management vector and community awareness approach.

In September, 30th 2020 the country has recorded more than 142.000 deaths linked to COVID-19 and more than 4.745.464 confirmed cases. It is one of the worst affected country just behind The US and India.

More than 3.5 million cases of dengue were confirmed by governments in Latin America in the first three months of 2024, compared with 4.5 million in all of 2023, making 2024 on track to be the worst year for dengue ever recorded.

Social and health indicators
Indicator	In year	Value	Ref
Life expectancy	2019	76.6	
Infant mortality	2019	1.24%	
Fertility rate	2019	1.71	
Basic sanitation	2019	88%	
Smoking rates	2018	9.3%	
Obesity female	2019	30.2%	
Obesity male	2019	22.8%	
Undernutrition	2018	2.5%	
HIV prevalence	2017	0.6%	

== Life expectancy ==
Development of life expectancy

The life expectancy of the Brazilian population increased from 71.16 years in 1998 to 76.76 years in 2018, according to the Brazilian Institute of Geography and Statistics (IBGE), and currently 76.76 years in 2018. Life expectancy was 59.50 years in 1940.

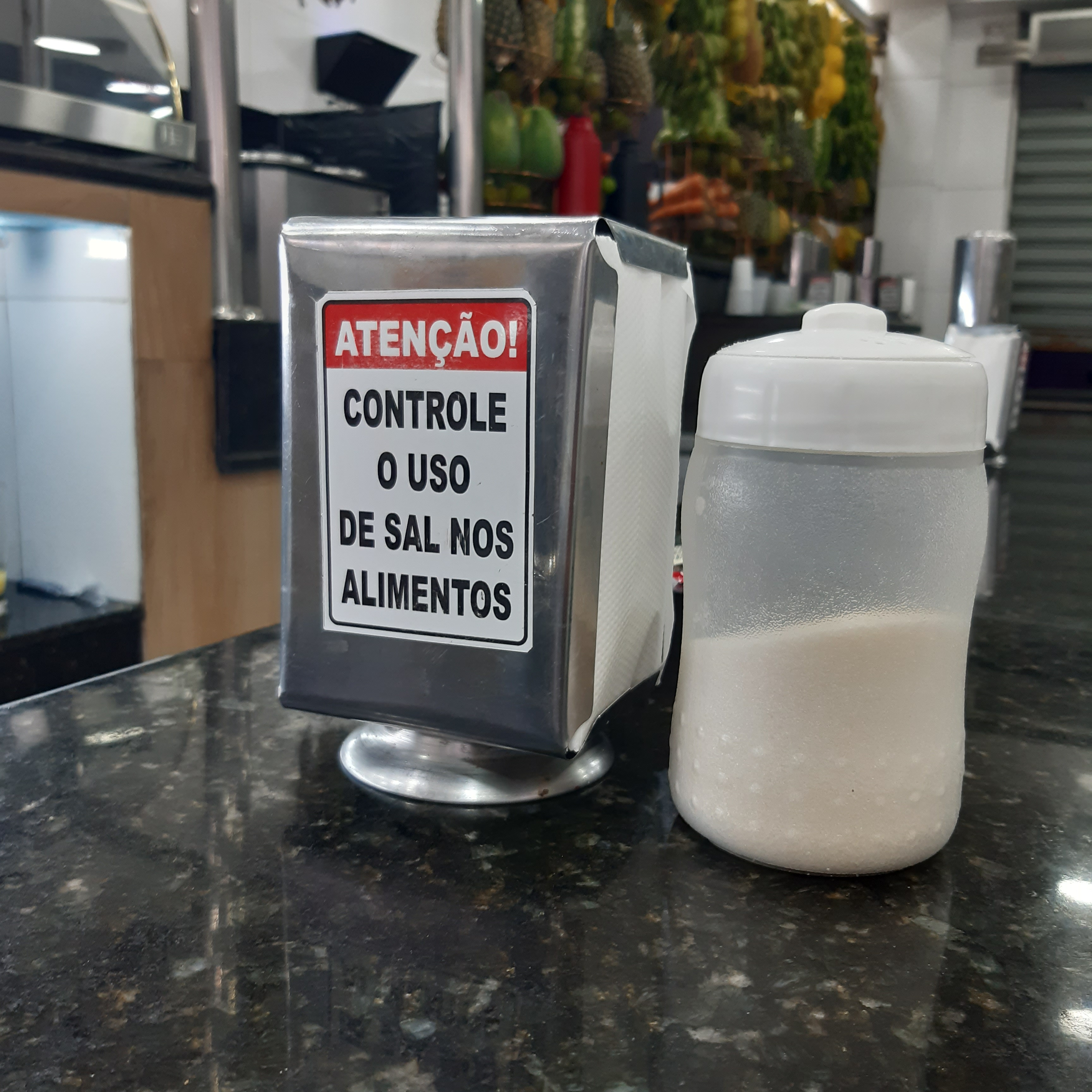
A sign in a restaurant in Manaus, Brazil which reads "Attention! Control the use of salt in food"

Demographic projections foresee the continuation of this process, estimating a life expectancy in Brazil around 77.39 years in 2020. According to the IBGE, Brazil will need some time to catch up with Japan, Hong Kong (China), Switzerland, Iceland, Australia, France and Italy, where the average life expectancy is already over 82. Although, research has shown that Brazil could achieve an expectancy of around 80.12 years by 2030 and pass 82 by 2040 and 2050 will be over 85 years.

The decline in mortality at young ages and the increase in longevity, combined with the decline of fecundity and the accentuated increase of degenerative chronic diseases, caused a rapid process of demographic and epidemiological transition, imposing a new public health agenda in the face of the complexity of the new morbidity pattern.

== Infant mortality ==
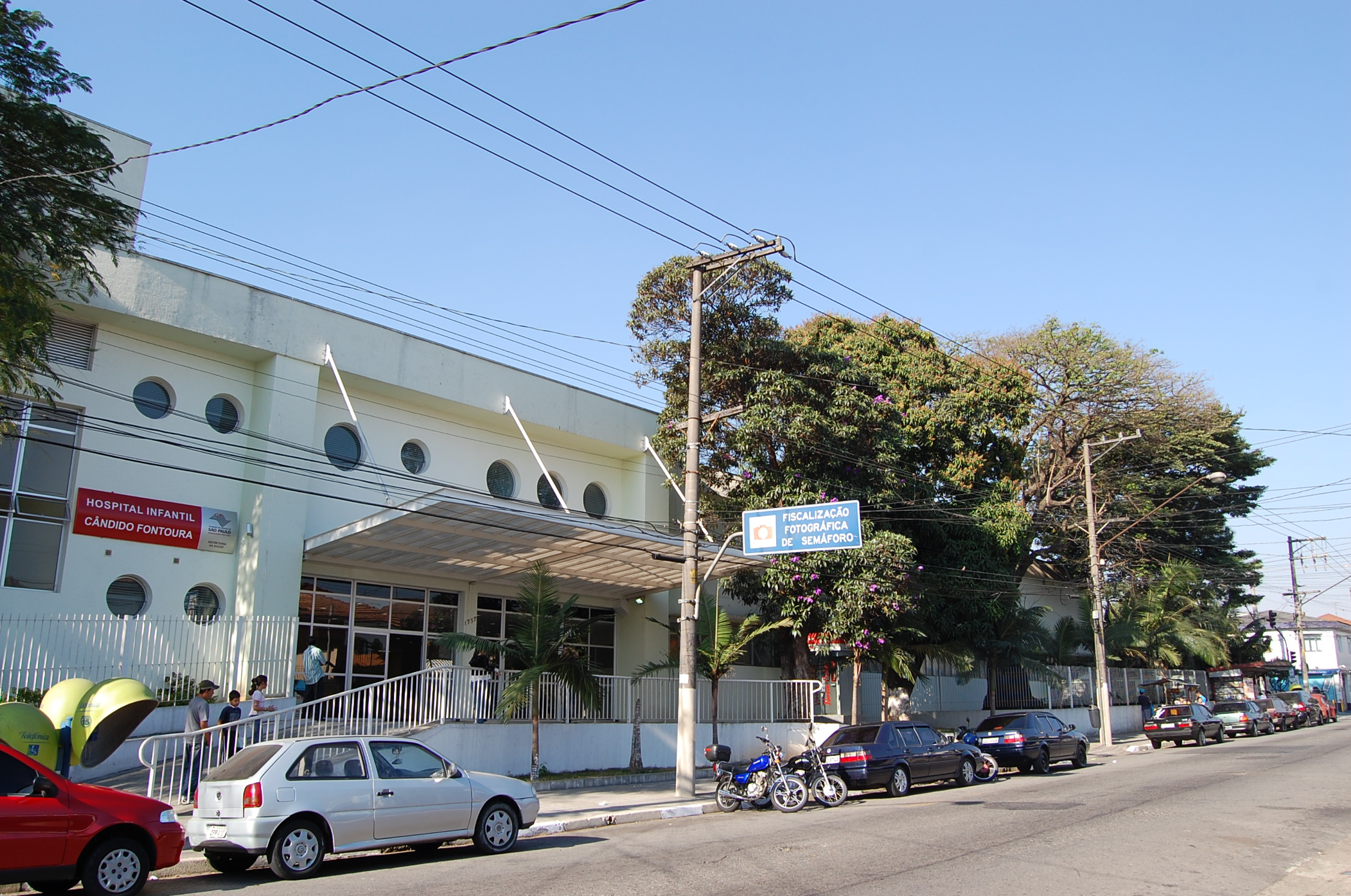
Cândido Fontoura Children's Hospital, São Paulo.

For example, mortality among indigenous infants in 2000 was more than triple that of the general population, highlighting the importance of tailored health policies to address disparities in health outcomes for Brazil's Indigenous Peoples. Sanitation, education and per capita income are the most important explanatory factors of poor child health in Brazil. According to De Souza et al. (2021), prenatal care is one of the most important indicators of maternal and infant health; their research demonstrated that in 2012, the number of women who began prenatal care in the first quarter of pregnancy increased from 0.34 to 0.79 in 2015 and the number of prenatal consultations, increased from 1.03 in 2012 to 3.94 in 2015. Data from a study covering all live births in Porto Alegre from 2000 to 2017 revealed a correlation between fewer prenatal care consultations and higher infant mortality rates (Anele et al., 2021). The research examined infant mortality rates concerning three components of The Municipal Human Development Index (MHDI): longevity, education, and income. Children born to mothers with medium MHDI scores faced a 1.54 times higher risk of mortality compared to those born to mothers with very high MHDI scores. Additionally, offspring of mothers in macro-regions with low education levels (MHDIE) experienced a 1.66 times higher mortality rate compared to those in regions with high education levels. Medium MHDI scores and low MHDIE scores indicated a 16% increased risk of infant mortality. The study emphasized that, although higher maternal education doesn't guarantee complete protection against infant mortality in the first year, having less than 8 years of schooling increases the infant mortality rate by 37 to 40% across MHDI and its three elements. Women in Brazil with lower levels of education faced limitations in accessing prenatal care, had fewer prenatal appointments, and predominantly relied on public healthcare services (Viellas et al., 2014).

ethnographic findings of infant mortality rates (IMR) in northeast Brazil are not accurate because the government tends to overlook infant morality rates in rural areas. These issues tend to be inaccurate due to a huge amount of underreporting and questions related to the cultural validity and the contextual soundness of these mortality statistics. There is a solution to this issue however and scientists stress that quality local-level cultural data can serve to craft as the alternative and appropriate method to measure infant death in Brazil accurately. In order to not overlook infant mortality rates it is also stressed that there needs to be a focus on an ethnography of experience, a vision that cuts to the core of human suffering as it flows from daily life and experiences. For example, one must get down to the flesh, blood and souls of infant death in the impoverished households of Brazilians in order to understand and live with those who have to suffer its consequences. Methods of gathering mortality data also need to be respectful of local death customs and must be implemented in places where death is experienced through a different cultural lens.

== Obesity ==
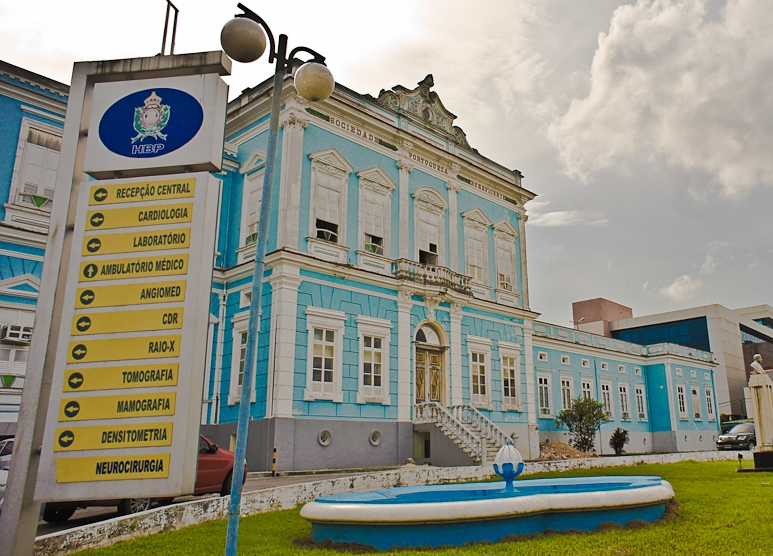
Portuguese Beneficent Hospital, in Manaus.

Obesity in Brazil is a growing health concern. 52.6 percent of men and 44.7 percent of women in Brazil are overweight. 35% of Brazilians are obese in 2018. The Brazilian government issued nutrition guidelines in 2014 which subsequently caught the attention of public health experts for its simplicity and their critical position towards the food industry. In September 2020, the Ministry of Agriculture published a technical note saying that the guidelines unjustly attack industrialized foods and asked for revision of the recommendation. International scientists sent a group letter to the ministry of Agriculture criticizing the position in relation to The Brazilian food guide.

== Climate change and health ==
Outline map of the Amazon biome (white outline) and Amazon basin (light blue outline)

The WHO Country Report on Climate and Health - 2015 placed Brazil as an important and unique player in climate change for being economically and environmentally relevant. It is among the largest economies in the world and at least 60% of the Amazon rainforest is in its territory.

The main vulnerabilities posed by climate change in this report were "risk of coastal flooding, reduced water availability, health risks associated with heat stress, and interference in climate sensitive vector borne diseases, such as malaria and dengue".

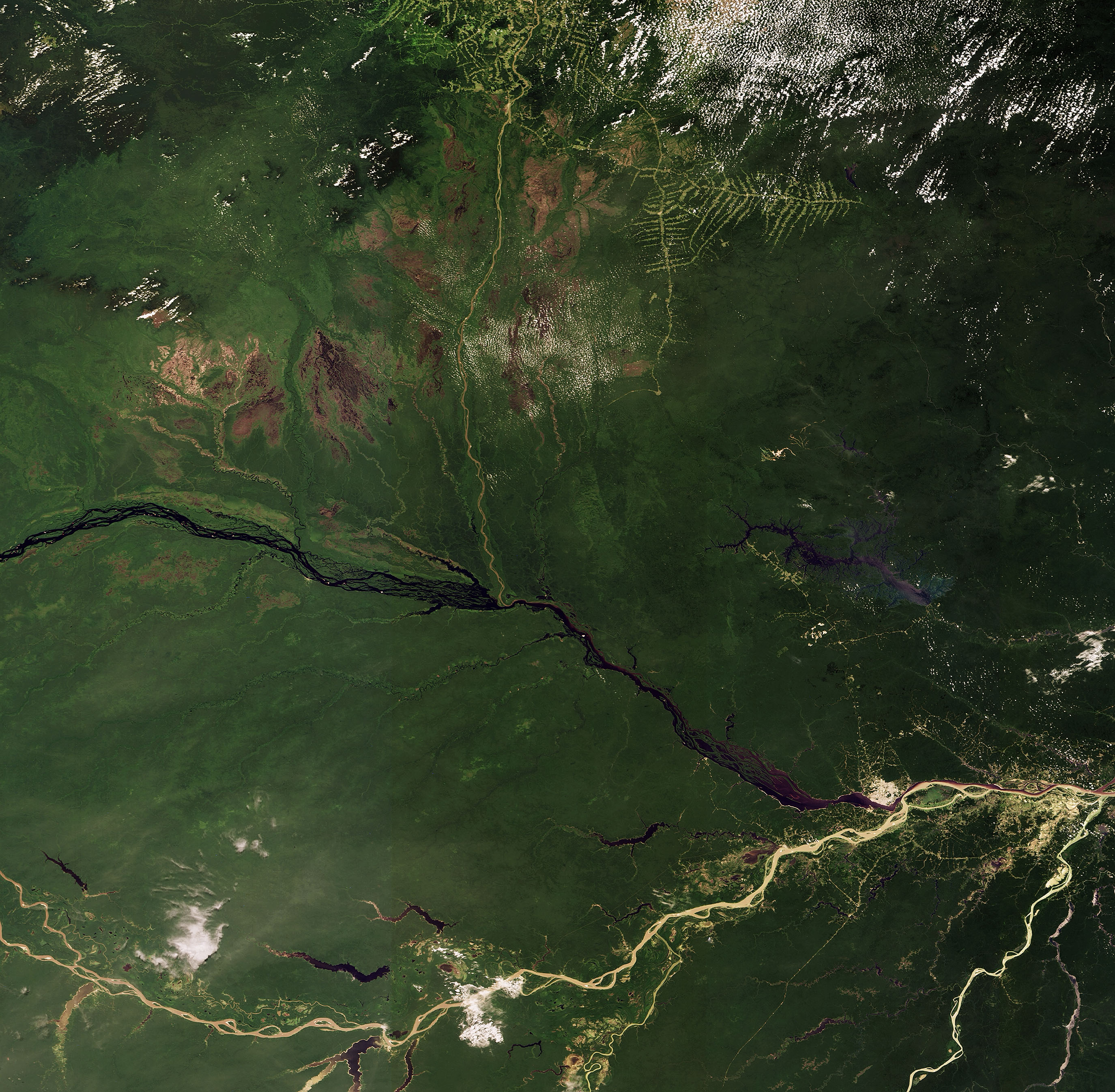
Brazilian Amazon

Another threat that could be softened by decarbonization is outdoor air pollution, which is mainly a consequence of the use of fossil fuels for energy generation and transportation. It poses a major risk for respiratory, cardiovascular, dermatological diseases and cancers, particularly for the population living in the urban areas. In Brazil, between 2010 and 2012, 4 out of the 5 most populated cities which had the information about air pollution available were above the annual mean for fine particulate matter (PM2.5) levels of 10 μg/m^{3} from the WHO guideline.

Inland river flood risk can also be more frequent and affect broader areas in a high emission scenario, putting additional 78,600 people at risk of drowning, food insecurity, lack of access to safe water and sanitation, infectious diseases outbreaks and socio-economic changes.

In 2016, Brazil developed a National Adaptation Plan to Climate Change, coordinated by the Ministry of Environment and with the participation of 26 Federal Government Institutions, among then, the Ministry of Health. Other agents from civil-society, private-sector and the state also contributed to the writing.

Under the section of health and climate change, this plan focused on 4 main health-related risks associated to climate: natural disasters, air pollution, unavailability and quality of water resources and climate sensitive infectious diseases. For each risk, they analyzed vulnerabilities and potential impacts in the population and in the health system. Further on, the document provided guidance and strategies focusing on evidence and information management, awareness and education, potential alliances, and adaptation measures.

In December 2020, Brazil submitted to the UN Framework Convention on Climate Change (UNFCCC) an updated Nationally Determined Contribution (NDC) under the Paris Agreement, with the compromise of reducing greenhouse gas (GHG) emissions by 37% until 2025 and 43% until 2030, relative to 2005.

Nevertheless, as for September 2021, the Climate Action Tracker (CAT) rated Brazilian response to mitigate climate change as Insufficient. The underlying reasons are challenges faced by the country to keep COVID-19 under control, increasing deforestation rate trends and unsatisfactory policies for halting emissions growth and support the energy transition to a greener and more sustainable one.

Even so, in May 2021, seven Brazilian-healthcare institutions (out of 43 in the world so far) joined the Race to Zero campaign, a United Nations initiative to promote leadership and ramp up the move to achieve net zero and a healthier, greener, and sustainable economy. Many Brazilian companies and cities are also committed to this initiative as a global effort to hasten Government's contributions to achieve the Paris Agreement.

== See also ==
- Healthcare in Brazil
- Sistema Único de Saúde
- HIV/AIDS in Brazil
- Education in Brazil
- Demography of Brazil
- Brazilian traditional medicine
