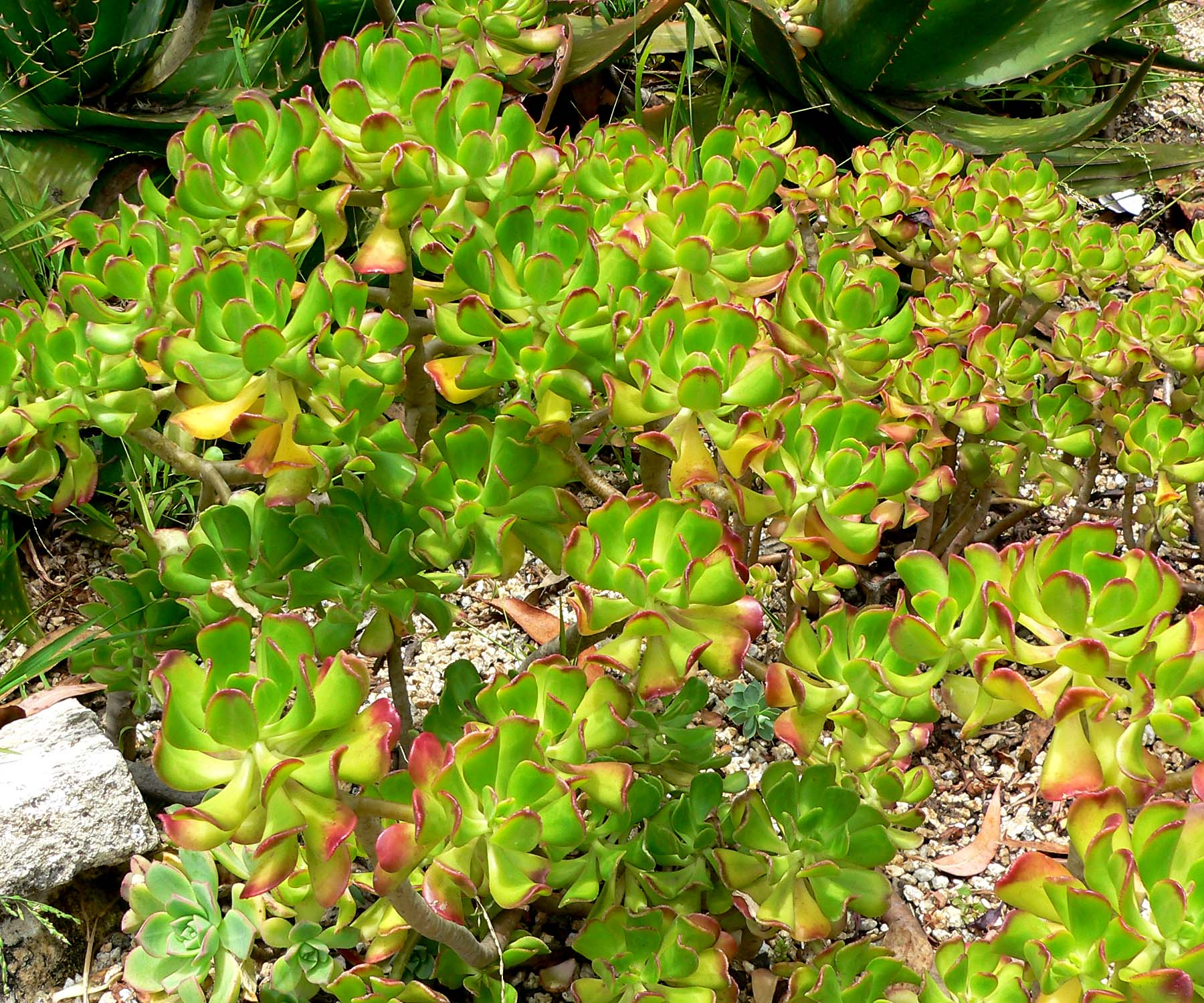
- Sedum dendroideum at the San Francisco Botanical Garden

Scientific classification
- Kingdom: Plantae
- Clade: Tracheophytes
- Clade: Angiosperms
- Clade: Eudicots
- Order: Saxifragales
- Family: Crassulaceae
- Genus: Sedum
- Species: S. dendroideum

Binomial name
- Sedum dendroideum Moc. & Sessé ex DC.

= Sedum dendroideum =

Species of succulent

Sedum dendroideum, commonly known as the tree stonecrop or the false hens-and-chickens, is a shrub-like perennial plant that looks much like its Sempervivum look-alike. It is native to Mexico.

== Uses ==
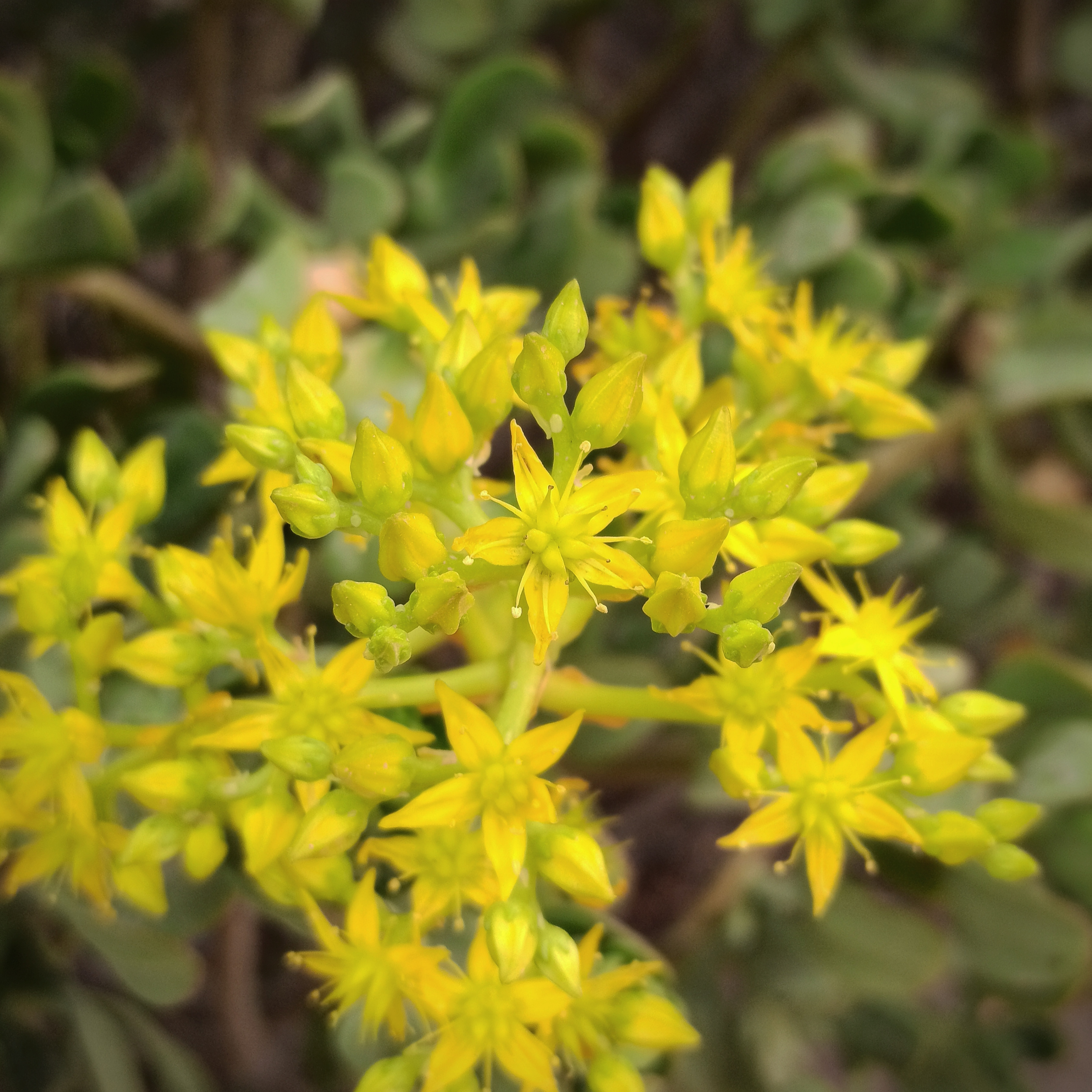
Yellow flowers

=== Ornamental ===
Due to their appearance and hardiness, like many plants in the sedum family, tree stonecrop are cultivated as garden plants. In winter, its leaves turn red.

=== Traditional medicine ===
In traditional Brazilian medicine, the fresh juice from the leaves of the tree stonecrop plant is used for the treatment of gastric and inflammatory disorders. In 2005, a medical research paper was released studying its uses, finding it had antinociceptive and anti-inflammatory effects in mice.

== Habitat ==
The plant thrives in warm, arid climates, as well as in cooler climates. It has been naturalized to California, and Ohio.
