= Unified Health System =

Public health system of Brazil

- Sistema Único de Saúde
- SUS logo

Publicly funded health service overview
- Formed: 19 September 1990
- Jurisdiction: Brazil
- Headquarters: Brasília, Federal District
- Employees: Circa 1 million
- Annual budget: R$ 218 billion (2024)
- Minister responsible: Alexandre Padilha, Minister of Health
- Parent department: Ministry of Health
- Website: meususdigital.saude.gov.br

The Unified Health System (Portuguese: Sistema Único de Saúde, Brazilian Portuguese pronunciation: [sisˈtemɐ ˈuniku dʒi saˈudʒi]), better known by its acronym SUS (pronounced [sus]), is the publicly funded health care system of Brazil. Created in 1990, the SUS is the largest government-run public health care system in the world, by number of beneficiaries/users (virtually 100% of the Brazilian population; 220 million people), land area coverage (8.5 million km^{2} (3.3 million sq mi)), and number of treatment centers in its affiliation network (with over 50,000 clinics). The system is entirely free of any cost at the point of service for any person, including foreigners.

The SUS provides services ranging from primary care to complex procedures and offers emergency care for people who suffer accidents through the Urgent Mobile Care Service (Serviço de Atendimento Móvel de Urgência; SAMU). The Brazilian health system also provides free vaccines and medicines for people with various diseases (such as diabetes, high blood pressure, asthma, HIV and Alzheimer's), funds research in the area of epidemiology and monitors the quality of food offered in commercial establishments through the National Health Surveillance Agency (Anvisa).

== Creation ==
After the end of the military dictatorship that had ruled the country for 20 years from the 1960s to the 1980s, the 1988 Constitution of Brazil sought to guarantee more rights and freedoms to the population, and set many objectives of social development. Among those, improving health care was set as a priority:

Health is a right of all and an obligation of the State, guaranteed by socioeconomic policies which seek to the reduction of the risk of disease and of other grievances and to the universal and equal access to the actions and services in its promotion, protection and recuperation.

Two years later on Wednesday, 19 September 1990, the objectives set in the constitution were consolidated in the letter of the law by the Federal Law Number 8.080, whose articles created the SUS and defined its actuation. Prior to that, only people who contributed with the social security were able to receive health care. The creation of the SUS was important in that more than 80% of the Brazilian population depend on it to receive medical treatment. Brazil provides two-tier health care, and almost 25% of the population pay for private insurance.

== Objectives ==
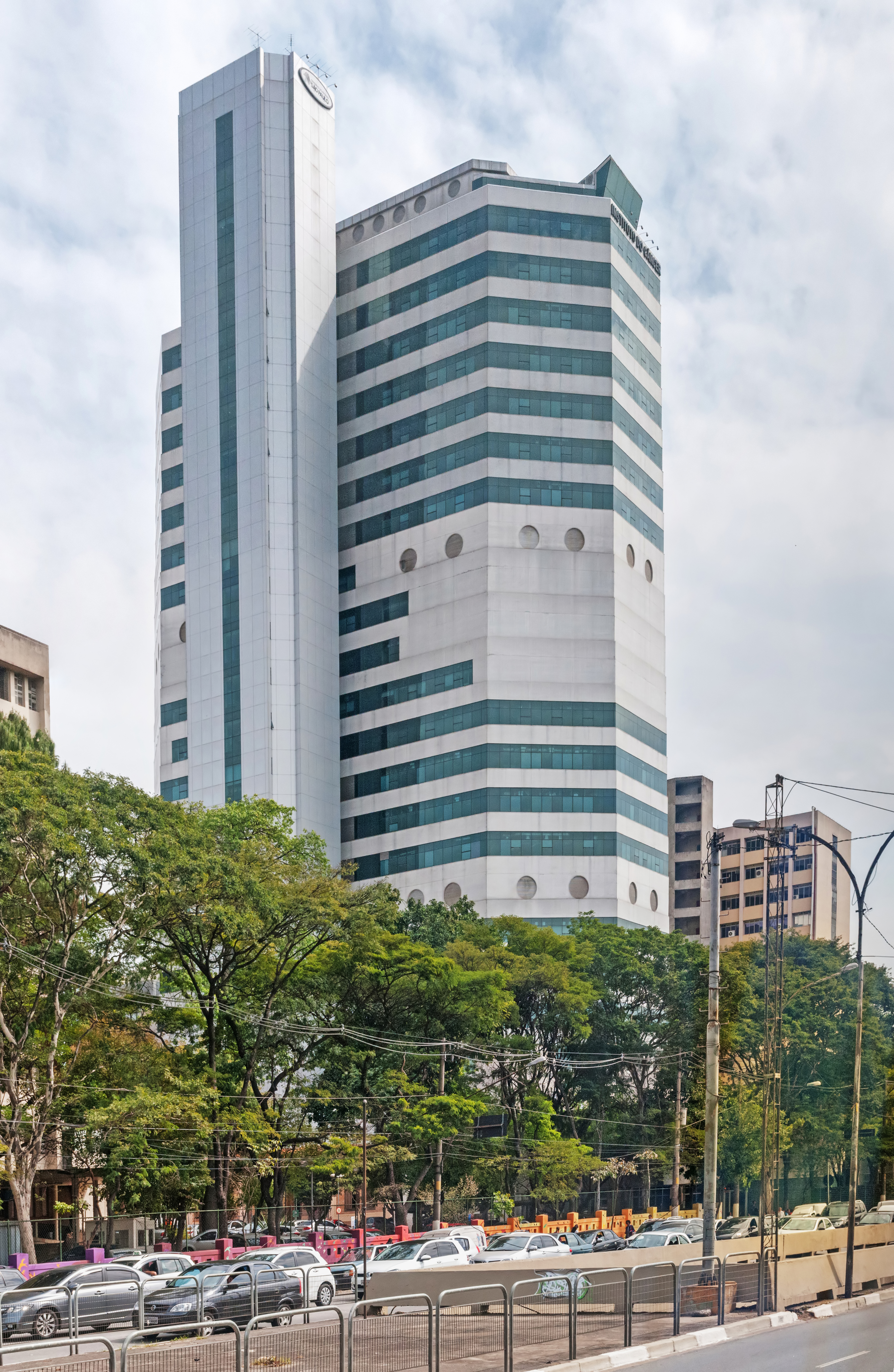
Institute of Cancer of São Paulo

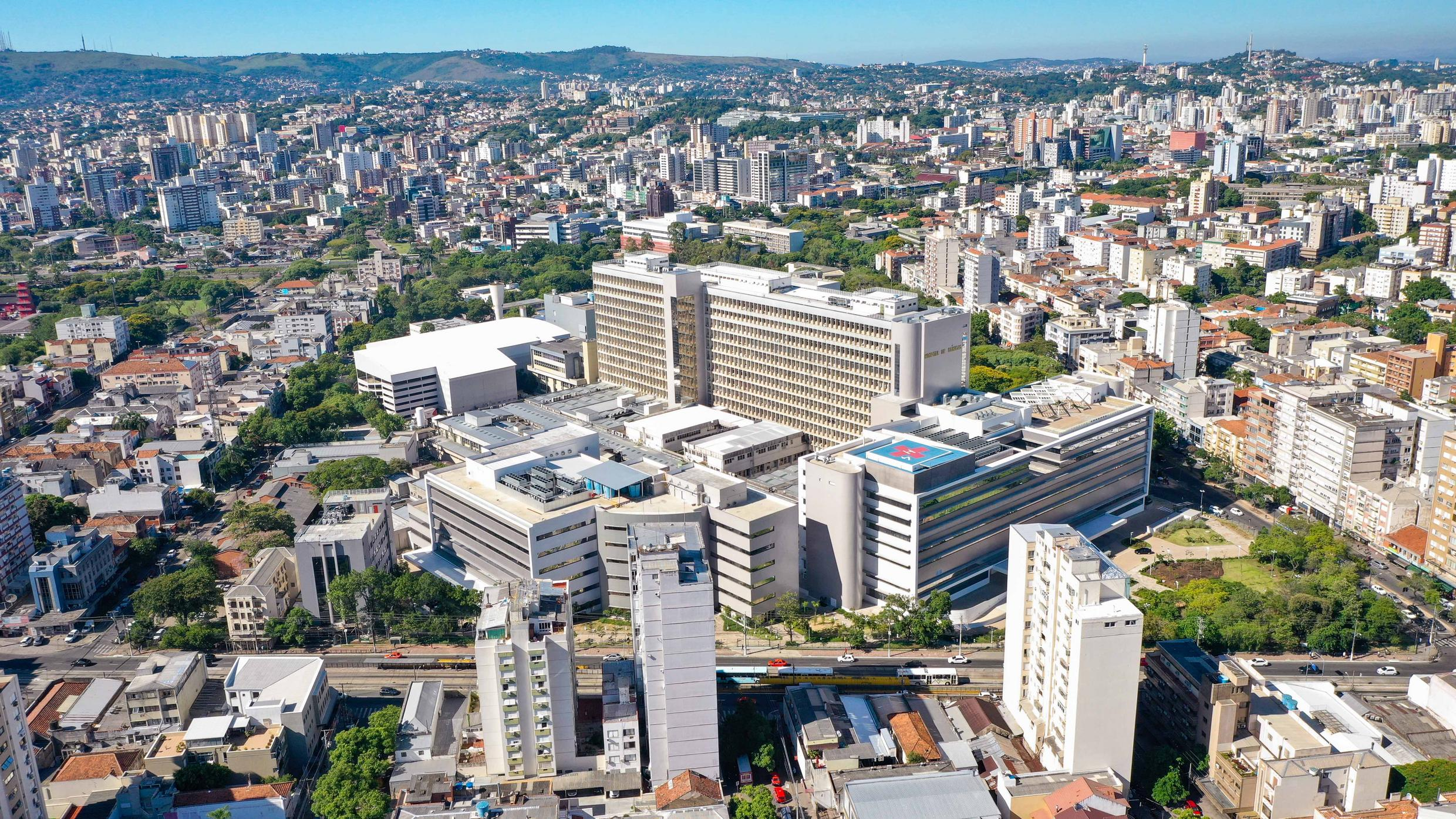
Federal University of Rio Grande do Sul Hospital complex in Porto Alegre

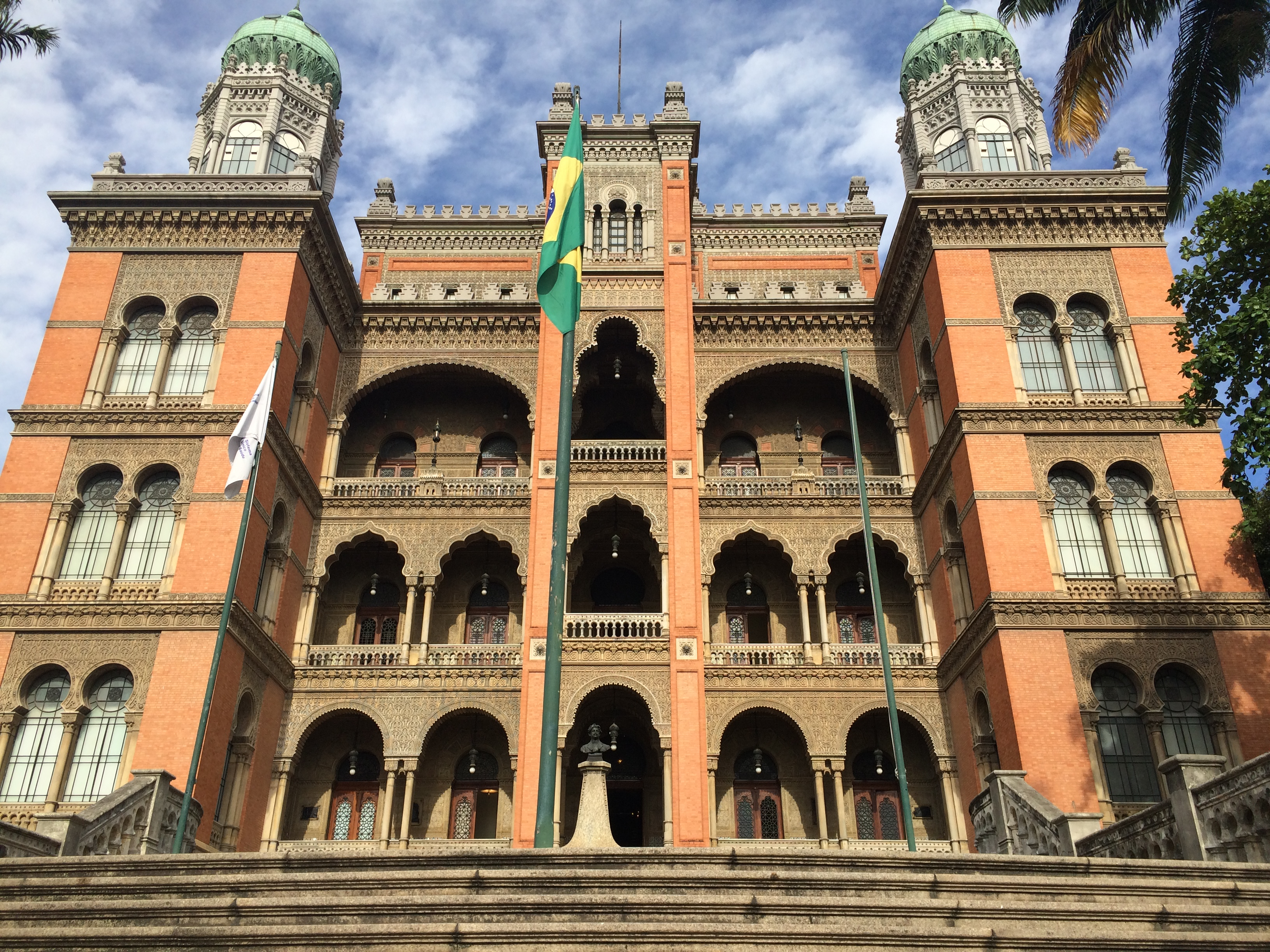
Oswaldo Cruz Foundation in Rio de Janeiro

The SUS's objectives are, by the law of its creation, defined as:

- The identification and publication of determinant and conditioning factors for human health;
- The formulation of the health policy;
- Assistance to the people through actions of promotion, protection and recuperation of health, with the integrated realization of assistance actions and preventive activities;
- Sanitation and health surveillance;
- Epidemiological vigilance;
- Occupational safety and health;
- Integral therapeutic assistance, including pharmaceutic;
- Organization of the formation of health human resources;
- Nutritional vigilance and orientation;
- Collaboration with the protection of environment, including work environment;
- Formulation of policies regarding drugs, equipment, immunobiologicals and other resources of interest for human health, and participation in its production;
- The control and fiscalization of services, products e substances of interest for human health;
- The fiscalization and inspection of food, water and beverages for human consumption;
- The participation in the control and fiscalization of the production, transportation, safety and utilization of radioactive, toxic, and psychoactive substances and products;
- Scientific and technological developments in its area of actuation;
- The formulation and execution of the national policy for blood and its derivatives.

== Constitutional principles ==
A closer look at the Health section, (of the Article 196 to the Article 198) of the Constitution, shows that five basic principles have been established that guide the legal system in relation to SUS. They are: universality (Article 196), integrality (Article 198-II), equity (Article 196 - "universal and equal access"), decentralization (Article 198-I) and social participation (Article 198-III).

=== Universality ===
This principle can be obtained from the definition of the Article 196, which considered health as a "right of all and duty of the State". Thus, the right to health is a fundamental right of any and all citizens, even being considered a clause set in stone, that is, it cannot be removed from the Constitution under any circumstances, as it constitutes an individual right and guarantee, according to the Section of the Legislative Process, the Article 60, the Paragraph 4, the Item IV.

=== Comprehensiveness ===
Completeness, according to the Article 198, in the Item II, confers on the State the duty of “comprehensive care, with priority for preventive activities, without prejudice to assistance services” in relation to the access that any and every citizen is entitled to. For this reason, the State must establish a set of actions that range from prevention to curative assistance, at the most diverse levels of complexity, as a way of implementing and guaranteeing the postulate of health.

“Man is an integral, biopsychosocial being, and he must be served with this integral vision by a health system that is also integral, aimed at promoting, protecting and restoring his health.”

=== Equity ===
The principle of equity is related to the constitutional mandate that “health is the right of all”, provided for in the aforementioned Article 196 of the Constitution. The aim here is to preserve the postulate of isonomy, since the Constitution itself, in Individual and Collective Rights and Duties, the Article 5, establishes that “all are equal before the law, without distinction of any kind”. Therefore, all citizens, equally, must have their health rights guaranteed by the State. However, regional and social inequalities can lead to the innocence of this isonomy, after all, a more needy area may demand more spending compared to others. For this reason, the State must treat "unequal unequals", concentrating its efforts and investments in territorial areas with the worst rates and deficits in the provision of public services.

Equal access (equity principle) does not mean that the SUS should treat everyone equally, but rather respect the rights of everyone, according to their differences, based more on the intimate conviction of natural justice than on the letter of the law.

=== Decentralization ===
It is established in Da Saúde, the Article 198, that “public health actions and services are part of a regionalized and hierarchical network and constitute a single system, organized according to the following guidelines: I - decentralization, with a single direction in each sphere of government [...] ”. For this reason, the Unified Health System is present at all federal levels — Union, States, Federal District and Municipalities — so that what falls within the scope of national coverage will be the responsibility of the Federal Government, which is related to the competence of a State must be under the responsibility of the State Government, and the same definition occurs with a Municipality. In this way, a greater dialogue is sought with the local civil society, which is closer to the manager, to ask him about the appropriate public policies.

Throughout the years, the Brazilian Unified Health System (SUS) has undergone a significant decentralization process. This process has allowed greater participation in health care decision-making among the state, federal and municipal levels of government. Likewise, this has encouraged social participation in health policy legislation and increased accountability for providing health care services.

=== Social participation ===
It is also foreseen in the same Article 198, the Item III, the “participation of the community” in the actions and public health services, acting in the formulation and in the control of their execution. Social control, as this principle is also called, was better regulated by the aforementioned Federal Law Number 8,142 of 1990. Users participate in the management of the SUS through the Health Conferences, which take place every four years at all federal levels - Union, States, Federal District and Municipalities. In Health Councils, there is a so-called parity: while users have half of the vacancies, the government has one room and workers another. Therefore, it seeks to encourage popular participation in the discussion of public health policies, giving greater legitimacy to the system and the actions implemented.

Nevertheless, it is observed that the Original Constituent of 1988 did not seek only to implement the public system of universal and free health in the country, in contrast to what existed in the military period, which favored only workers with a formal contract. It went further and also established principles that would guide the interpretation that the legal world and the spheres of government would make about the aforementioned system. And from the reading of these principles, the Constituent concern to reinforce the defense of the citizen before the State is noticed, guaranteeing means not only for the existence of the system, but also for the individual to have a voice to fight for its improvement and greater effectiveness.

== See also ==
- Health in Brazil
- Healthcare in Brazil
