= The American Journal of Chinese Medicine =

- Discipline: Medicine, integrative medicine
- Language: English
- Edited by: Chun-Su Yuan

Publication details
- History: 1973-present
- Publisher: World Scientific
- Frequency: 8 issues annually
- Impact factor: 4.67 (2020)

Standard abbreviations
- ISO 4: Am. J. Chin. Med.

Indexing
- ISSN: 0192-415X (print); 1793-6853 (web)

Links
- Journal homepage

The American Journal of Chinese Medicine is published by World Scientific and covers topics relating to alternative medicine of all cultures, such as traditional Chinese medicine, including acupuncture. It was established in 1973 by Frederick F. Kao.

== Journal contents ==
The journal only publishes papers following the Declaration of Helsinki and the "Guiding Principles and Procedures of the Massachusetts General Hospital on Human Studies, 1970." In particular emphasis is placed on the following areas:

- Basic scientific and clinical research in indigenous medical techniques, therapeutic procedures, medicinal plants, and traditional medical theories and concepts
- Multidisciplinary study of medical practice and health care, especially from historical, cultural, public health, and socioeconomic perspectives
- International policy implications of comparative studies of medicine in all cultures, including such issues as health in developing countries, affordability and transferability of health-care techniques and concepts
- Translating scholarly ancient texts or modern publications on ethnomedicine

== Editors-in-chief ==
- 1973 - 1992: Frederick F. Kao, founding editor-in-chief
- 1993 - 2003: John J. Kao
- 2003–present: Chun-Su Yuan

== Abstracting and indexing ==
The journal is abstracted and indexed in Biological Abstracts, Current Contents/Clinical Medicine, Science Citation Index Expanded, and Index Medicus.
