= Healthcare in Brazil =

Healthcare in Brazil is a constitutional right. It is provided by both private and government institutions. The Ministry of Health of Brazil administers national health policy. Primary healthcare remains the responsibility of the federal government, elements of which (such as the operation of hospitals) are overseen by individual states. Public healthcare is provided to all Brazilian permanent residents and foreigners in Brazilian territory through the National Healthcare System, known as the Unified Health System (Portuguese: Sistema Único de Saúde, SUS). The SUS is universal and free for everyone.

== History ==
The National Ministry of Health was founded in 1953.

The authoritarian military government introduced health care reforms in the 1970s to extend its control and legitimacy over the North and Northeast of Brazil where the military had limited presence. Until 1988, the health care system was centralized in the hands of the federal government and limited in its health care coverage. Prior to 1988, health care services were provided by the private sector, public sector and the social security sector.

The 1988 Constitution and subsequent reforms in the 1990s established universal health care coverage and a decentralization of health care delivery at the municipal level.

== Healthcare system ==
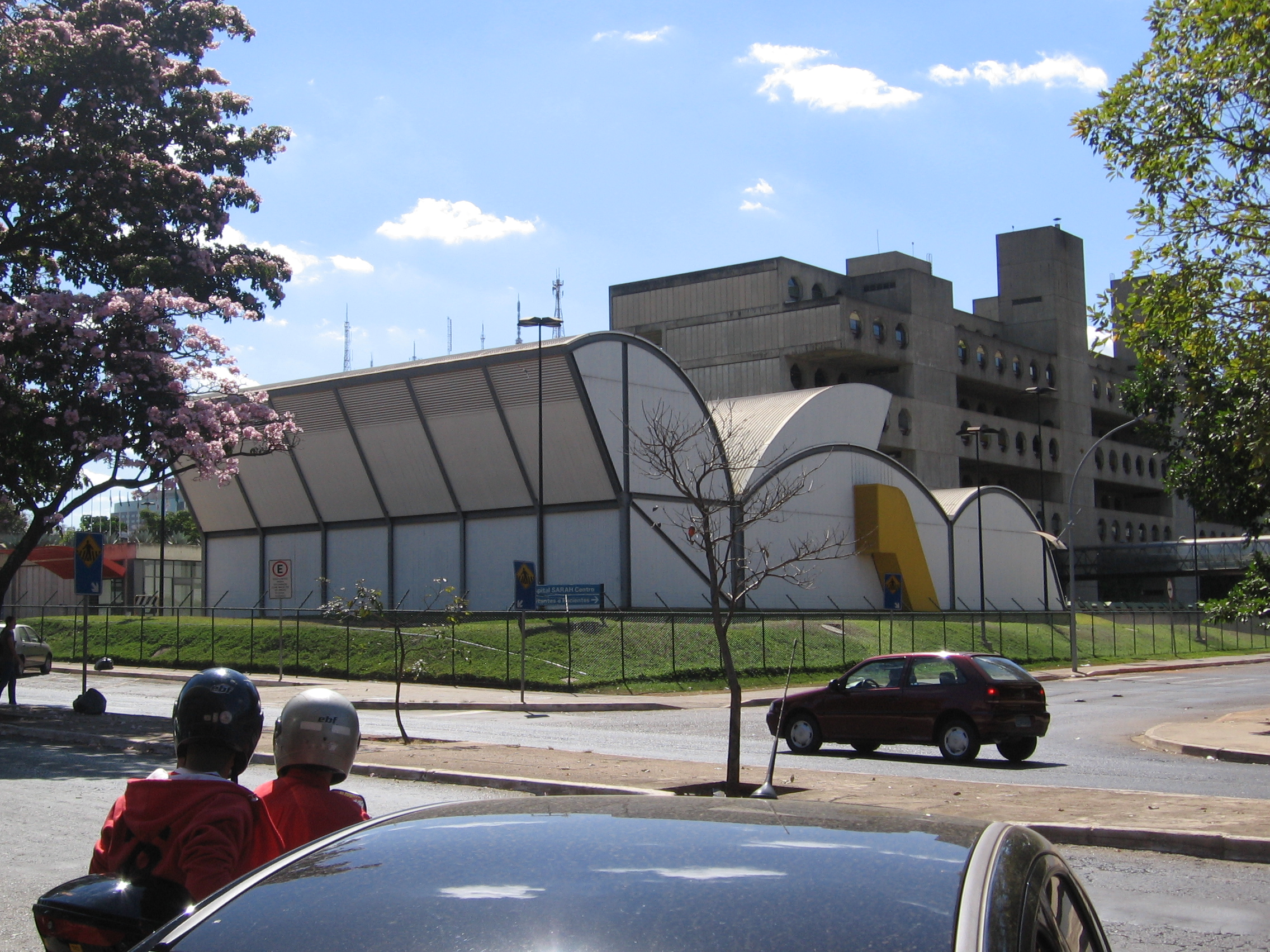
Sarah Kubitschek Hospital, Brasília

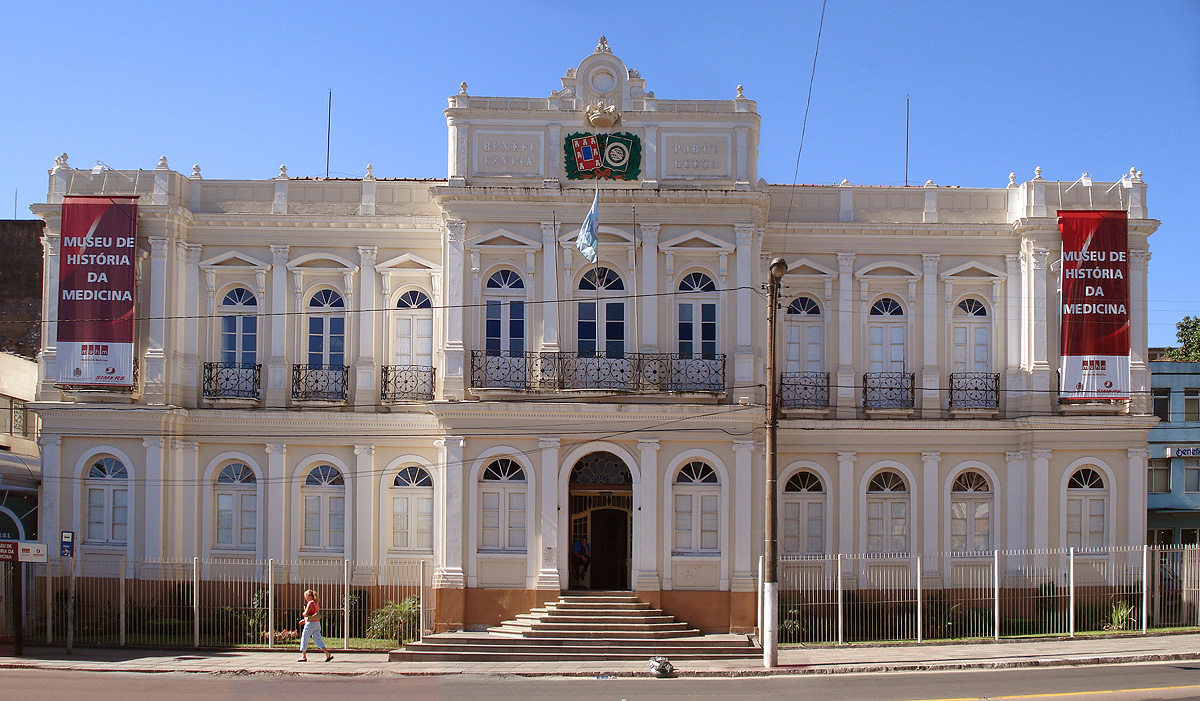
Portuguese Hospital, Porto Alegre

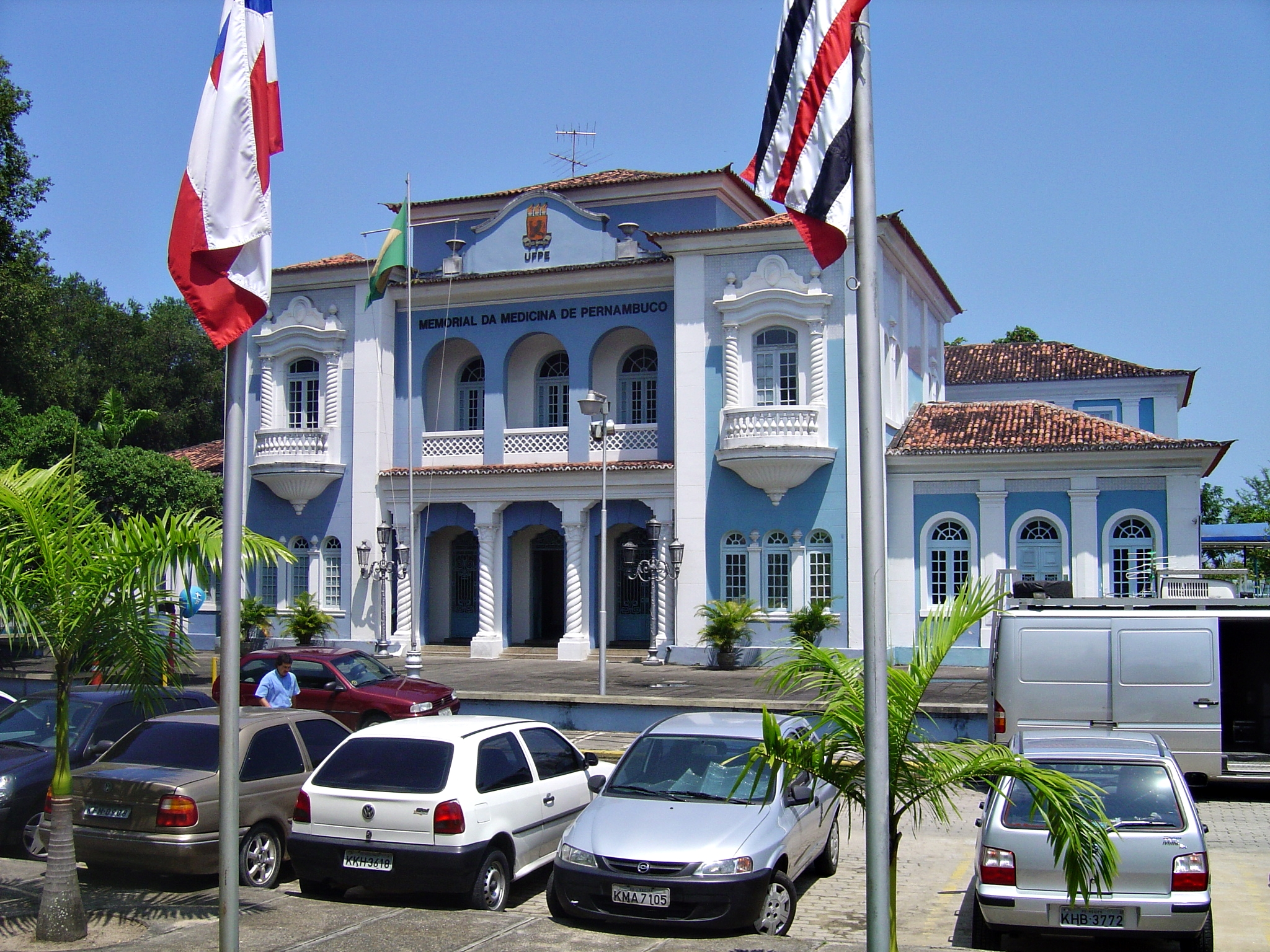
Memorial of Medicine, Recife

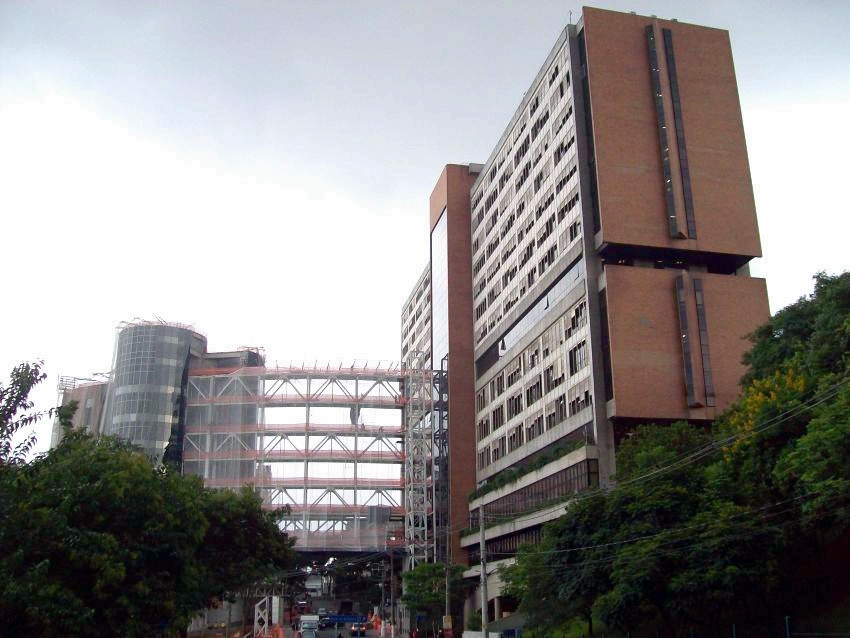
Albert Einstein Hospital, São Paulo

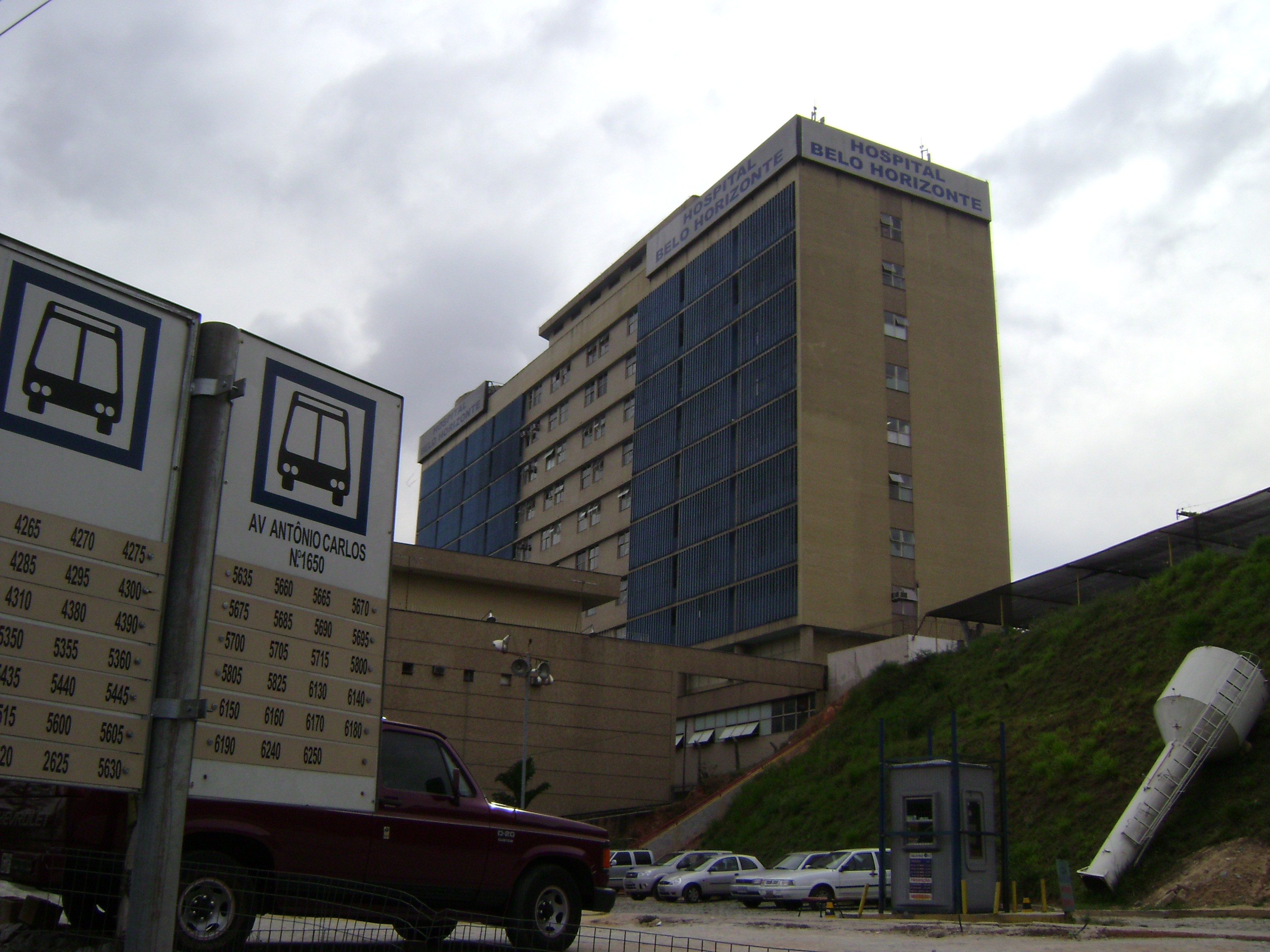
Hospital in Belo Horizonte

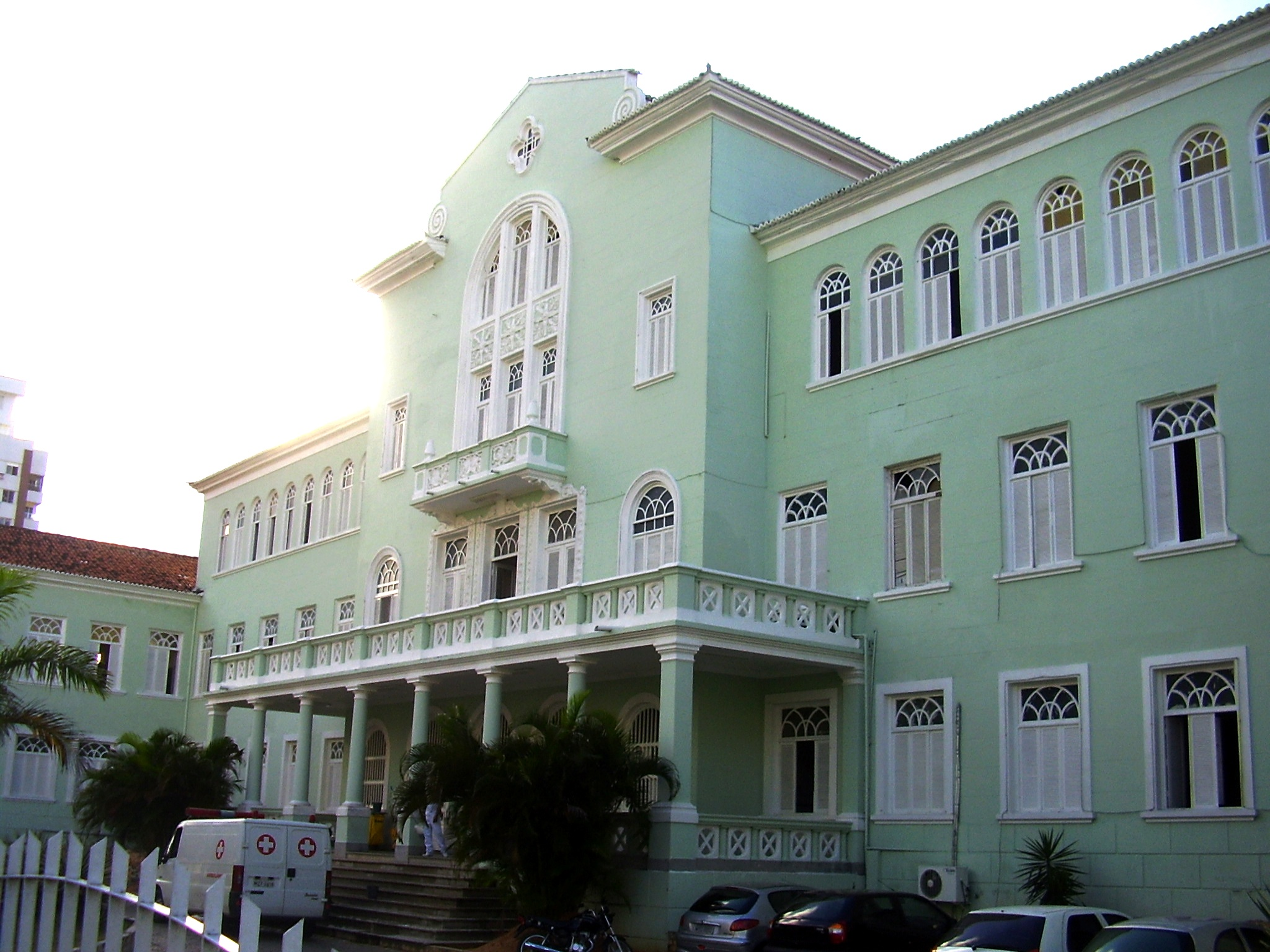
Maternity hospital, Natal

National health policies and plans: The national health policy is based on the Federal Constitution of 1988, which sets out the principles and directives for the delivery of healthcare in the country through the Unified Health System (SUS). Under the constitution, the activities of the federal government are to be based on multiyear plans approved by the national congress for four-year periods. The essential objectives for the health sector were improvement of the overall health situation, with emphasis on reduction of child mortality, and political-institutional reorganization of the sector, with a view to enhancing the operative capacity of the SUS. The plan for the next period (2000–2003) reinforces the previous objectives and prioritizes measures to ensure access at activities and services, improve care, and consolidate the decentralization of SUS management.

=== Health sector reform ===
The current legal provisions governing the operation of the health system, instituted in 1996, seek to shift responsibility for administration of the SUS to municipal governments, with technical and financial cooperation from the federal government and states. Another regionalization initiative is the creation of health consortia, which pools the resources of several neighbouring municipalities. A vital instrument of support for regionalization is the project for strengthening and reorganizing the SUS.

=== Regulatory actions ===
Procedures for the registration, control, and labelling of foods are established under federal legislation, which assigns specific responsibilities to the health and agriculture sectors. In the health sector, health inspection activities have been decentralized to the state and municipal governments. The environmental policy derives from specific legislation and from the Constitution of 1988.

The Program for Investment in the Health Industrial Complex (PROCIS) is an example of the medical-industrial complex in Brazil. This promotes medical research, development and treatment within Brazil.

=== Public healthcare services ===
The main strategy for strengthening primary healthcare is the Family Health Program, introduced by the municipal health secretariats in collaboration with the states and the Ministry of Public Health. The federal government supplies technical support and transfers funding through Piso de Atenção Básica. Disease prevention and control activities follow guidelines established by technical experts in the Ministry of Public Health. The National Epidemiology Center (CENEPI), an agency of the National Health Foundation (FUNASA) coordinates the national epidemiological surveillance system, which provides information about and analysis of the national health situation.

=== Individual healthcare services ===
In 2014 there were 6,706 hospitals in Brazil. Over 50% of hospitals are found in 5 states: São Paulo, Minas Gerais, Bahia, Rio de Janeiro and Paraná.

Throughout the country, 78% of hospitals practice general medicine while 16% are specialized and 6% provide outpatient care only.

In 2012, 66% of the country's hospitals, 70% of its 485,000 hospital beds, and 87% of its 723 specialized hospitals belonged to the private sector. In the area of diagnostic support and therapy, 95% of the 7,318 establishments were also private. 73% of the 41,000 ambulatory care facilities were operated by the public.

The public hospital infrastructure required hospitals to be spread over a territory of 8.516 million square kilometres (3.288 million square miles). As such, the public hospital infrastructure relies on a vast network of small hospitals. Over 55% of public hospitals have less than 50 beds.

Hospital beds in the public sector were distributed as follows: surgery (21%), clinical medicine (30%), pediatrics (17%), obstetrics (14%), psychiatry (11%) and other areas (7%). In the same year, 43% of public hospital beds, and half the hospital admissions were in municipal establishments.

Since 1999, the Ministry of Public Health has been carrying out a health surveillance project in Amazonia that includes epidemiological and environmental health surveillance, indigenous health and disease control components. With US 600 million dollars from a World Bank loan, efforts are being made to improve the operational infrastructure, training of human resources and research studies. An estimated 25% of the population is covered by at least one form of health insurance; 75% of the insurance plans are offered by commercial operators and companies with self-managed plans.

=== Health supplies ===
Brazil is among the greatest consumers markets for drugs, accounting for 3.5% share of the world market. To expand the access of the population to drugs, incentives have been offered for marketing generic products, which cost an average of 40% less than brand-name products. In 2000, there were 14 industries authorized to produce generic drugs and about 200 registered generic drugs were being produced in 601 different forms. In 1998, the National Drug Policy was approved, whose purpose is to ensure safety, efficacy, and quality of drugs, as well as the promotion of rational use and access for the population to essential products. The responsibility for national production of immunobiologicals is entrusted to public laboratories; which have a long-standing tradition of producing vaccines and are for use in official programs. The Ministry of Public Health invested some US$120 million in the development of the capacity of these laboratories. In 2000, the supply of products was sufficient to meet the need for heterologous use, such as those used in the vaccines against tuberculosis, measles, diphtheria, tetanus, whooping cough, yellow fever, and rabies. In 1999, quality control of the transfused blood consisted of 26 coordinating centers and by 44 regional centers.

=== Human resources ===
In 1999, the country had some 237,000 physicians, 145,000 dentists, 77,000 nurses, 26,000 dietitians and 56,000 veterinarians. The national average ratio was of 14 physicians per 10,000 population. In 1999, of the 665,000 professional positions, 65% were occupied by physicians, followed by nurses (11%), dentists (8%), pharmacists, biochemists (3.2%), physical therapists (2.8%) and by other professionals (10%). An estimated 1.4 million health sector jobs are occupied by technical and auxiliary personnel.

In 2009, for the first time, more new medical licenses were given for women than for men.

As of 2010, the country had 364,757 physicians. In 2011, there were 1.95 physicians for each 1000 Brazilians, with higher concentrations in south, southeast and mid-western than in north and northeastern Brazil. For each 1000 private health insurance users there were 7.6 occupied work posts for physicians, and for each 1000 Sistema Único de Saúde users, there were 1.95 occupied work posts for physicians, making an average of 3.33 occupied work posts for physicians for each 1000 Brazilians. As to the distribution of physicians between medical specialties and primary care, 55.09% of all Brazilian physicians were specialists.

=== Health sector expenditure ===
In 1998 national health expenditure amounted to US$62,000 million, which corresponded to nearly 7.9% of GDP. Of that total, public spending accounted for 41.2% and private expenditure accounted for 58.8%. In per capita terms, public spending is estimated at US$158 and private expenditure at US$225.

=== Technical cooperation ===
Technical cooperation projects are carried out with different countries, as well as with the World Bank and UNESCO among many others. International foundations also provide direct financing for projects or individuals. Brazil is also engaged in an intense exchange with the Mercosul countries, aimed at establishing common health regulations.

== Emergency medicine ==
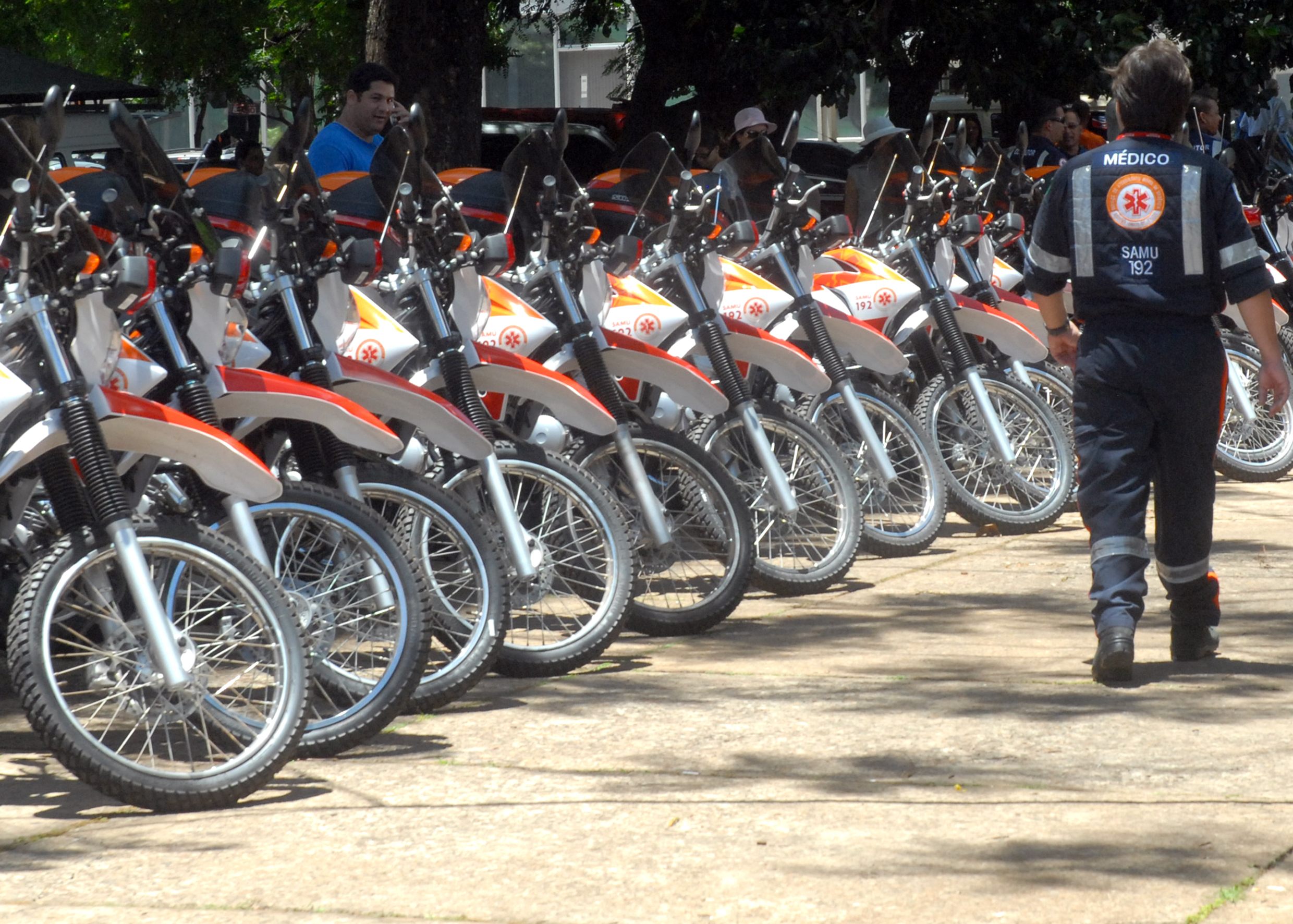
SAMU Motorbike, Federal District

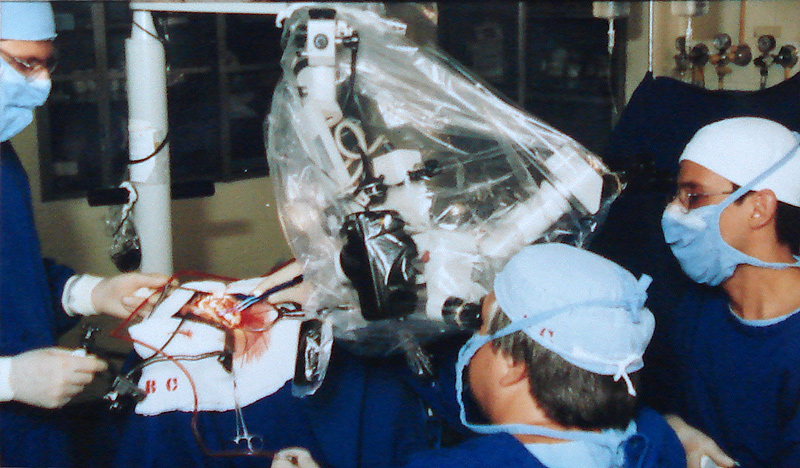
Surgery in Porto Alegre

Brazilian emergency medical service is locally called Urgent Mobile Care Service (Serviço de Atendimento Móvel de Urgência; SAMU). Emergency medicine (EM) is not a new field in Brazil. In 2002, the Ministry of Health outlined a document, the "Portaria 2048," which called upon the entire health care system to improve emergency care in order to address the increasing number of victims of road traffic accidents and violence, as well as the overcrowding of emergency departments (EDs) resulting from an overwhelmed primary care infrastructure. The document delineates standards of care for staffing, equipment, medications and services appropriate for both pre-hospital and in-hospital. It further explicitly describes the areas of knowledge that an emergency provider should master in order to adequately provide care. However, these recommendations have no enforcement mechanism and, as a result, emergency services in Brazil still lack a consistent standard of care.

Pre-hospital emergency medical services use a combination of basic ambulances staffed by technicians and advanced units with physicians on board. No universal phone number exists for emergency calls, and the dispatch center physician determines whether the call merits an emergency transport or not. Pre-hospital physicians have variable training in emergency care, with training backgrounds ranging from internal medicine to obstetrics to surgery.

Similar to the early years of EM in the United States, emergency department physicians in Brazil come from different specialty backgrounds, many of them having taken the job as a form of supplementary income or as a result of unsuccessful private clinical practice. Since 50% of medical school graduates in Brazil do not get residency positions, these new physicians with minimal clinical training look for work in emergency departments. In larger tertiary hospitals, the ED is divided into the main specialty areas, internal medicine, surgery, psychiatry, pediatrics, and staffed by the corresponding physicians. Still, significant delays in care can occur when patients are inappropriately triaged or when communication between the areas is inadequate. In the non-tertiary care centers, which make up the majority of hospitals in the country, emergency department physicians are largely under-trained, underpaid and overstressed by their working conditions. This has compromised patient care and created an incredible need for improvement in the emergency care system.

A current plan in action in Brazil called the CATCH plan (Commission for the Advancement of Technology for Communications and Health). Funding is provided by the WHO, ITU, and voluntary countries and benefactors for existing and future projects. This CATCH program approbates the best advancements to accommodate Brazil's health issues.

== See also ==
- Health in Brazil
- Sistema Único de Saúde
