= Cabinet of Jair Bolsonaro =

Brazilian governmental cabinet

Bolsonaro Cabinet
- Cabinet of Brazil
- 2019–2022
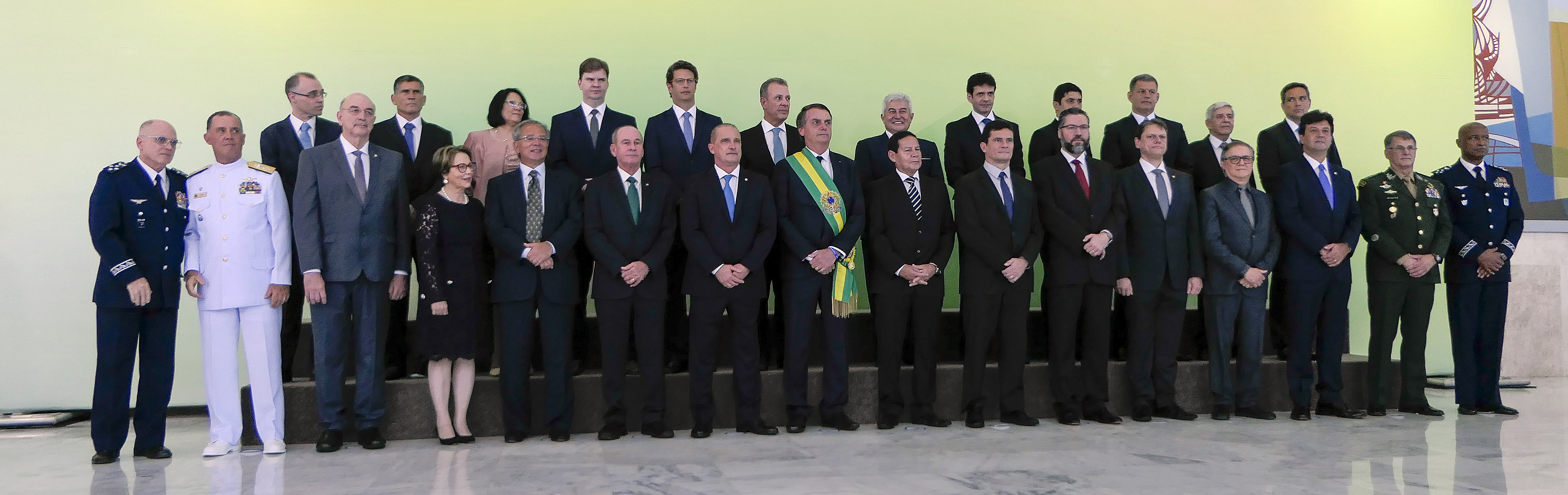
- Cabinet of President Jair Bolsonaro in January 2019
- Date formed: 1 January 2019
- Date dissolved: 31 December 2022

People and organisations
- President: Jair Bolsonaro
- President's history: 2019–2022
- Vice President: Hamilton Mourão
- No. of ministers: 23 (incl. Cabinet-level members)
- Ministers removed: 19 resigned
- Member parties: Social Liberal Party; Liberal Party; Progressistas; Social Democratic Party; Brazilian Democratic Movement; Republicanos; Social Christian Party; Podemos; Brazilian Labour Party; Avante; Patriota
- Status in legislature: Majority coalition
- Opposition parties: Workers' Party; Brazilian Social Democracy Party; Brazilian Socialist Party; Democratic Labour Party; Solidariedade; Republican Party of the Social Order; Socialism and Liberty Party; Communist Party of Brazil; New Party; Cidadania; Green Party; Sustainability Network
- Opposition leaders: Wolney Queiroz; Randolfe Rodrigues

History
- Election: 2018 general election
- Legislature term: 56th Legislature of the National Congress
- Advice and consent: Federal Senate
- Predecessor: Cabinet of Michel Temer
- Successor: Second cabinet of Lula da Silva

In December 2018, the final composition of Jair Bolsonaro's cabinet emerged after weeks of announcements and appointments. The cabinet includes 22 personnel, of which 16 are ministers, two are cabinet-level positions and four are secretaries directly linked to the presidency of Brazil. The 22 figure is down from 29 in the outgoing administration. Seven of the ministers will be military men; eight have technocrat profiles; and seven are politicians. Hindustan Times commented that "there are just two women in Bolsonaro’s government, which is double the number in the outgoing lineup under President Michel Temer", and that "there are no blacks, despite half of Brazil’s population being at least partly descended from Africans.

== Supporting parties ==
Party	Main ideology	Leader
Government parties
Social Liberal Party (PSL)	Right-wing populism	Luciano Bivar
Brazilian Labour Renewal Party (PRTB)	Social conservatism	Levy Fidelix
Out of coalition parties
Democrats (DEM)	Liberal conservatism	ACM Neto
Social Christian Party (PSC)	Christian right	Everaldo Pereira
Progressistas (PP)	Liberal conservatism	Ciro Nogueira
Social Democratic Party (PSD)	Conservative liberalism	Gilberto Kassab
Brazilian Democratic Movement (MDB)	Catch-all party	Romero Jucá
New Party (NOVO)	Classical liberalism	João Amoêdo
Brazilian Social Democracy Party (PSDB)	Neoliberalism	Geraldo Alckmin
Liberal Party (PL)	Conservatism	Valdemar Costa Neto

== Cabinet ==
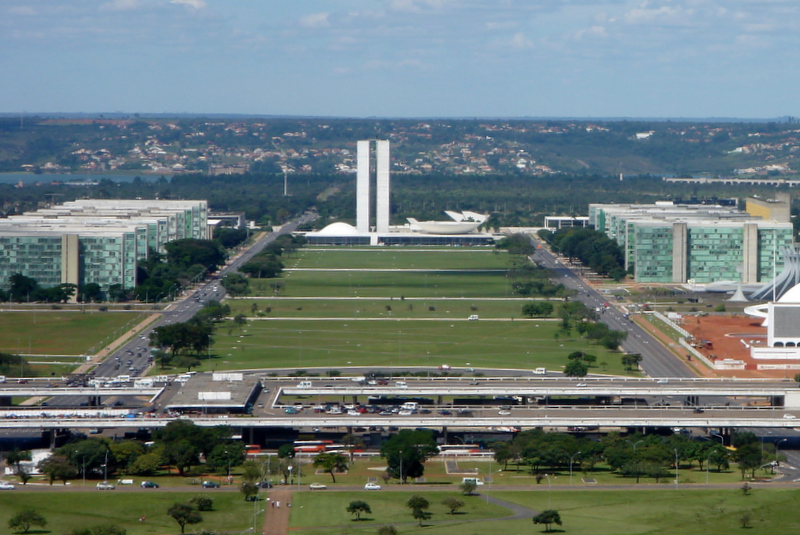
Esplanada dos Ministérios and the National Congress in background

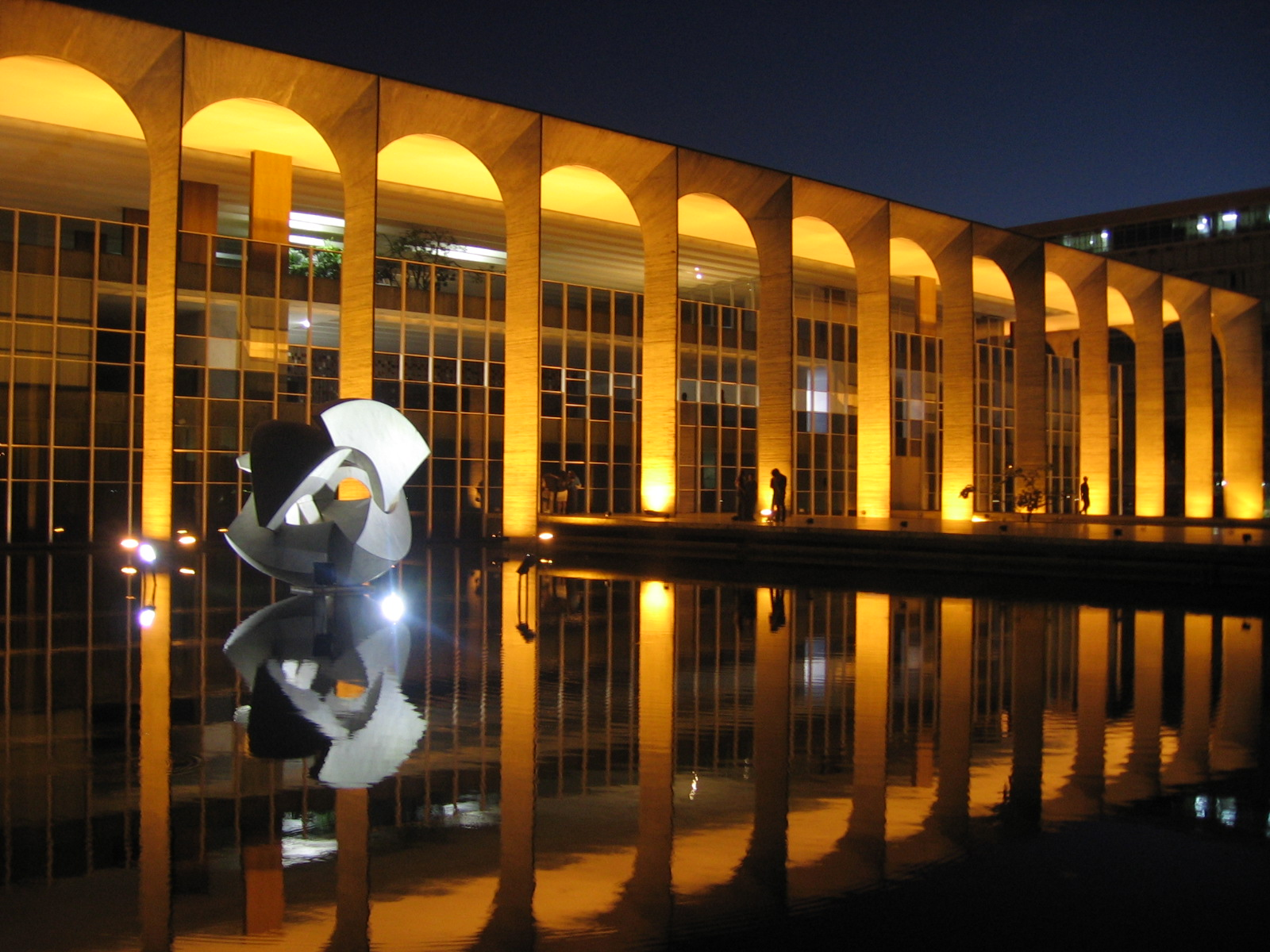
The Itamaraty Palace, seat of the Ministry of Foreign Affairs of Brazil

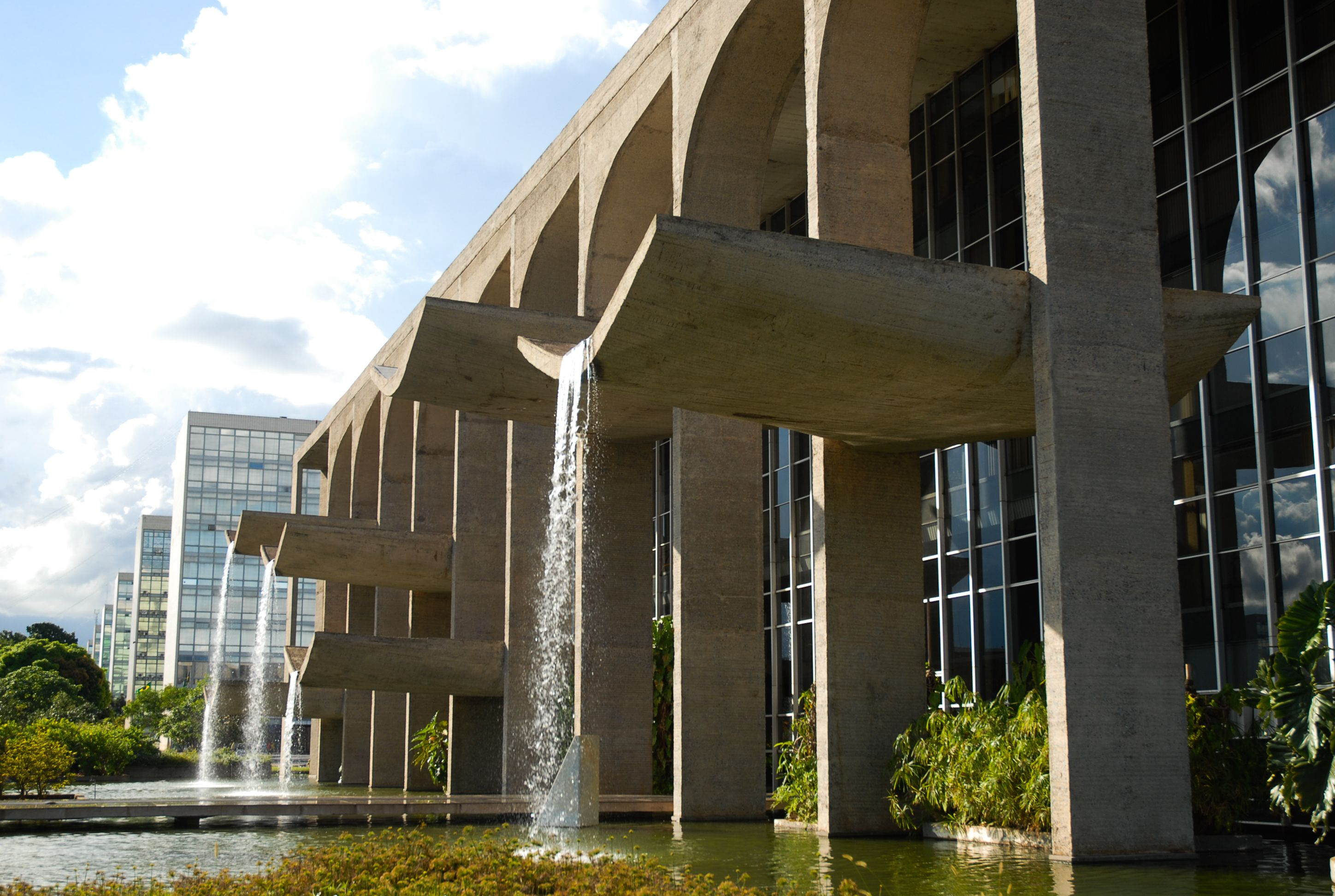
The Justice Palace, seat of the Ministry of Justice and Public Security

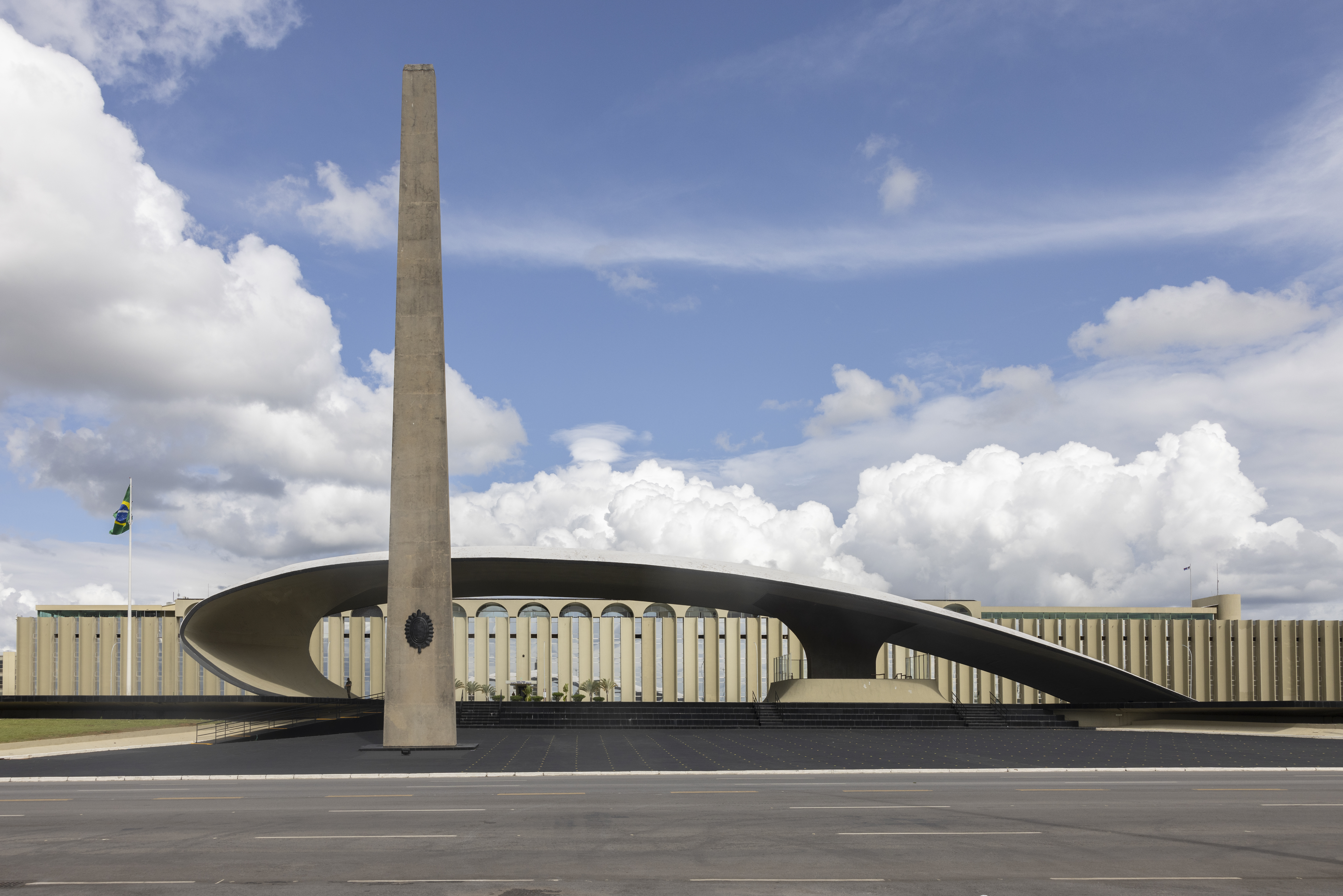
Army High Command HQ in Brasília

Party key	PSL	PRTB	DEM	MDB
Party key	PSD	Republicanos	PP	PSDB
Party key	PL	PSC	NOVO	No party

Portfolio	Portrait	Minister	Took office	Left office	Note
Cabinet ministers
Vice President		Hamilton Mourão	1 January 2019	31 December 2022	Acting President from 30 to 31 December 2022
Chief of Staff		Onyx Lorenzoni	1 January 2019	18 February 2020	Federal deputy on leave
Chief of Staff		Walter Braga Netto	18 February 2020	29 March 2021	
Chief of Staff		Luiz Eduardo Ramos	29 March 2021	26 July 2021	
Chief of Staff		Ciro Nogueira	26 July 2021	30 December 2022	Senator on leave
Secretary of Government		Santos Cruz	1 January 2019	13 June 2019	
Secretary of Government		Luiz Eduardo Ramos	13 June 2019	29 March 2021	
Secretary of Government		Flávia Arruda	30 March 2021	31 March 2022	Federal deputy on leave
Secretary of Government		Célio Faria Júnior	31 March 2022	31 December 2022	
Secretary-General of the Presidency		Gustavo Bebianno	1 January 2019	18 February 2019	
Secretary-General of the Presidency		Floriano Peixoto	18 February 2019	20 June 2019	
Secretary-General of the Presidency		Jorge Oliveira	20 June 2019	31 December 2020	
Secretary-General of the Presidency		Onyx Lorenzoni	12 February 2021	28 July 2021	Federal deputy on leave
Secretary-General of the Presidency		Luiz Eduardo Ramos	28 July 2021	31 December 2022	
Attorney General		André Mendonça	1 January 2019	28 April 2020	
Attorney General		José Levi do Amaral	28 April 2020	29 March 2021	
Attorney General		André Mendonça	29 March 2021	6 August 2021	
Attorney General		Bruno Bianco	6 August 2021	31 December 2022	
Comptroller General		Wagner de Campos Rosário	1 January 2019	31 December 2022	Former member of Temer cabinet
Secretary of Institutional Security		Augusto Heleno	1 January 2019	31 December 2022	
Minister of Agriculture and Livestock		Tereza Cristina	1 January 2019	30 March 2022	Federal deputy on leave
Minister of Agriculture and Livestock		Marcos Montes	30 March 2022	31 December 2022	Federal deputy on leave
Minister of Citizenship		Osmar Terra	1 January 2019	14 February 2020	Federal deputy on leave, former member of Temer cabinet
Minister of Citizenship		Onyx Lorenzoni	14 February 2020	12 February 2021	Federal deputy on leave
Minister of Citizenship		João Roma	12 February 2021	30 March 2022	Federal deputy on leave
Minister of Citizenship		Ronaldo Vieira Bento	30 March 2022	31 December 2022	
Minister of Communications		Fábio Faria	17 June 2020	21 December 2022	Federal deputy on leave
Minister of Defense		Fernando Azevedo e Silva	1 January 2019	29 March 2021	
Minister of Defense		Walter Braga Netto	29 March 2021	30 March 2022	
Minister of Defense		Paulo Sérgio Nogueira	30 March 2022	31 December 2022	
Minister of the Economy		Paulo Guedes	1 January 2019	31 December 2022	
Minister of Education		Ricardo Vélez Rodríguez	1 January 2019	8 April 2019	
Minister of Education		Abraham Weintraub	8 April 2019	20 June 2020	
Minister of Education		Milton Ribeiro	16 July 2020	28 March 2022	
Minister of Education		Victor Godoy	28 March 2022	31 December 2022	
Minister of Environment		Ricardo Salles	1 January 2019	23 June 2021	
Minister of Environment		Joaquim Leite	29 March 2021	31 December 2022	
Minister of Foreign Affairs		Ernesto Araújo	1 January 2019	29 March 2021	
Minister of Foreign Affairs		Carlos França	29 March 2021	31 December 2022	
Minister of Health		Luiz Henrique Mandetta	1 January 2019	16 April 2020	Federal deputy on leave
Minister of Health		Nelson Teich	17 April 2020	15 May 2020	
Minister of Health		Eduardo Pazuello	16 September 2020	23 March 2021	Acting from 2 June to 16 September 2020
Minister of Health		Marcelo Queiroga	23 March 2021	31 December 2022	
Minister of Infrastructure		Tarcísio de Freitas	1 January 2019	30 March 2022	
Minister of Infrastructure		Marcelo Sampaio	30 March 2022	31 December 2022	
Minister of Justice and Public Security		Sergio Moro	1 January 2019	24 April 2020	
Minister of Justice and Public Security		André Mendonça	29 April 2020	29 March 2021	
Minister of Justice and Public Security		Anderson Torres	29 March 2021	31 December 2022	
Minister of Labour and Social Security		Onyx Lorenzoni	28 July 2021	30 March 2022	Federal deputy on leave
Minister of Labour and Social Security		José Carlos Oliveira	30 March 2022	31 December 2022	
Minister of Mines and Energy		Bento Albuquerque	1 January 2019	11 May 2022	
Minister of Mines and Energy		Adolfo Sachsida	11 May 2022	31 December 2022	
Minister of Regional Development		Gustavo Canuto	1 January 2019	11 February 2020	
Minister of Regional Development		Rogério Marinho	11 February 2020	30 March 2022	Federal deputy on leave
Minister of Regional Development		Daniel Duarte Ferreira	30 March 2022	31 December 2022	
Minister of Science, Technology and Innovation		Marcos Pontes	1 January 2019	30 March 2022	
Minister of Science, Technology and Innovation		Paulo Alvim	30 March 2022	31 December 2022	
Minister of Tourism		Marcelo Álvaro Antônio	1 January 2019	9 December 2020	Federal deputy on leave
Minister of Tourism		Gilson Machado Neto	9 December 2020	30 March 2022	
Minister of Tourism		Carlos Brito	30 March 2022	31 December 2022	
Minister of Woman, Family and Human Rights		Damares Alves	1 January 2019	30 March 2022	
Minister of Woman, Family and Human Rights		Cristiane Britto	30 March 2022	31 December 2022	
Non-cabinet positions
President of the Central Bank of Brazil		Ilan Goldfajn	9 June 2016	28 February 2019	
President of the Central Bank of Brazil		Roberto Campos Neto	28 February 2019	31 December 2024	
Chairman of the Brazilian Development Bank		Joaquim Levy	1 January 2019	17 June 2019	
Chairman of the Brazilian Development Bank		Gustavo Montezano	17 June 2019	31 December 2022	
CEO of Petrobras		Roberto Castello Branco	3 January 2019	13 April 2021	
CEO of Petrobras		Joaquim Silva e Luna	16 April 2021	28 March 2022	
CEO of Petrobras		José Ferreira Coelho	14 April 2022	20 June 2022	
CEO of Petrobras		Caio Paes de Andrade	28 June 2022	4 January 2023	
Chief of the Joint Staff of the Armed Forces		Raul Botelho	19 January 2019	31 May 2021	
Chief of the Joint Staff of the Armed Forces		Laerte de Souza Santos	31 May 2021	31 December 2022	
Commander of the Brazilian Army		Edson Leal Pujol	11 January 2019	30 March 2021	
Commander of the Brazilian Army		Paulo Sérgio Nogueira	30 March 2021	30 March 2022	
Commander of the Brazilian Army		Marco Antônio Freire Gomes	30 March 2022	30 December 2022	
Commander of the Brazilian Navy		Ilques Barbosa Junior	9 January 2019	30 March 2021	
Commander of the Brazilian Navy		Almir Garnier Santos	30 March 2021	6 January 2023	
Commander of the Brazilian Air Force		Antonio Carlos Moretti Bermudez	4 January 2019	30 March 2021	
Commander of the Brazilian Air Force		Carlos de Almeida Baptista Júnior	12 April 2021	2 January 2023	
