= João Roma =

Brazilian lawyer and politician

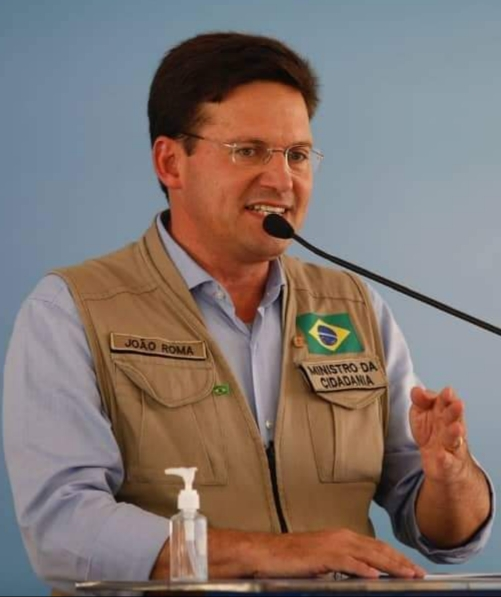

Minister of Citizenship
- In office 12 February 2021 – 31 March 2022
- President: Jair Bolsonaro
- Preceded by: Onyx Lorenzoni
- Succeeded by: Ronaldo Bento

Federal Deputy
- In office 1 February 2019 – 1 February 2023
- Constituency: Bahia

Personal details
- Born: João Inácio Ribeiro Roma Neto; 17 November 1972 (age 53) Recife, Pernambuco, Brazil
- Party: PL (2022–present)
- Other political affiliations: DEM (1993–2016); Republicanos (2016–2022)
- Spouse: Roberta Roma
- Awards: Grand Cross of the Order of Rio Branco

João Inácio Ribeiro Roma Neto (born 17. November 1972 in Recife) is a Brazilian politician and former Minister of Citizenship. Roma Neto served during the presidency of Jair Bolsonaro from February 2021 to March 2022.

He is the president of the Liberal Party (PL) for the state of Bahia

He served as chief of staff for the mayor of Salvador (2013-2018), a federal deputy (2019-2023), and Minister of Citizenship from 2021 to 2022 in the government of Jair Bolsonaro.

He is married with Roberta Roma who also is a dederal deputy for the state of Bahia

Political offices
| Preceded by Onyx Lorenzoni | Minister of Citizenship; 2021–2022 | Succeeded by Ronaldo Bento |
