= Ana Moser =

Brazilian volleyball player, 12th Brazilian Minister of Sports

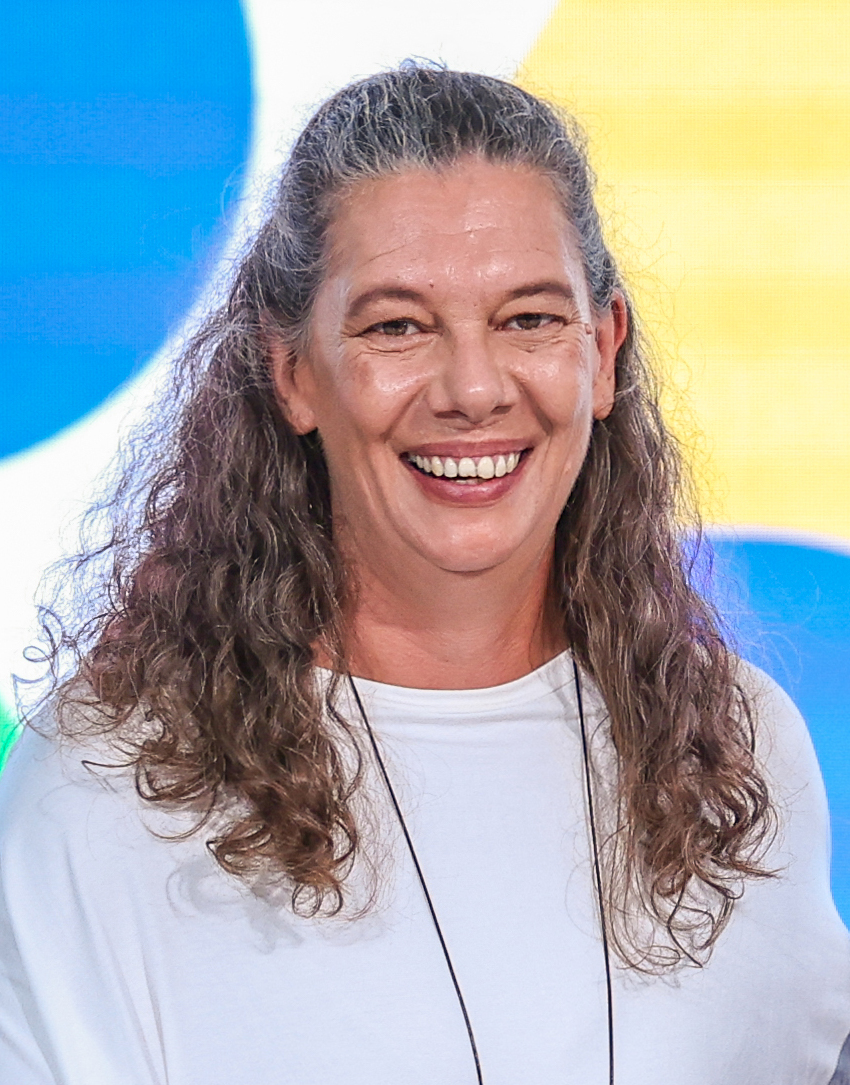

Minister of Sports
- In office 1 January 2023 – 13 September 2023
- President: Luiz Inácio Lula da Silva
- Preceded by: Ronaldo Bento (as Minister of Citizenship)
- Succeeded by: André Fufuca

Personal details
- Born: Ana Beatriz Moser; 14 August 1968 (age 58) Blumenau, Santa Catarina, Brazil
- Volleyball career
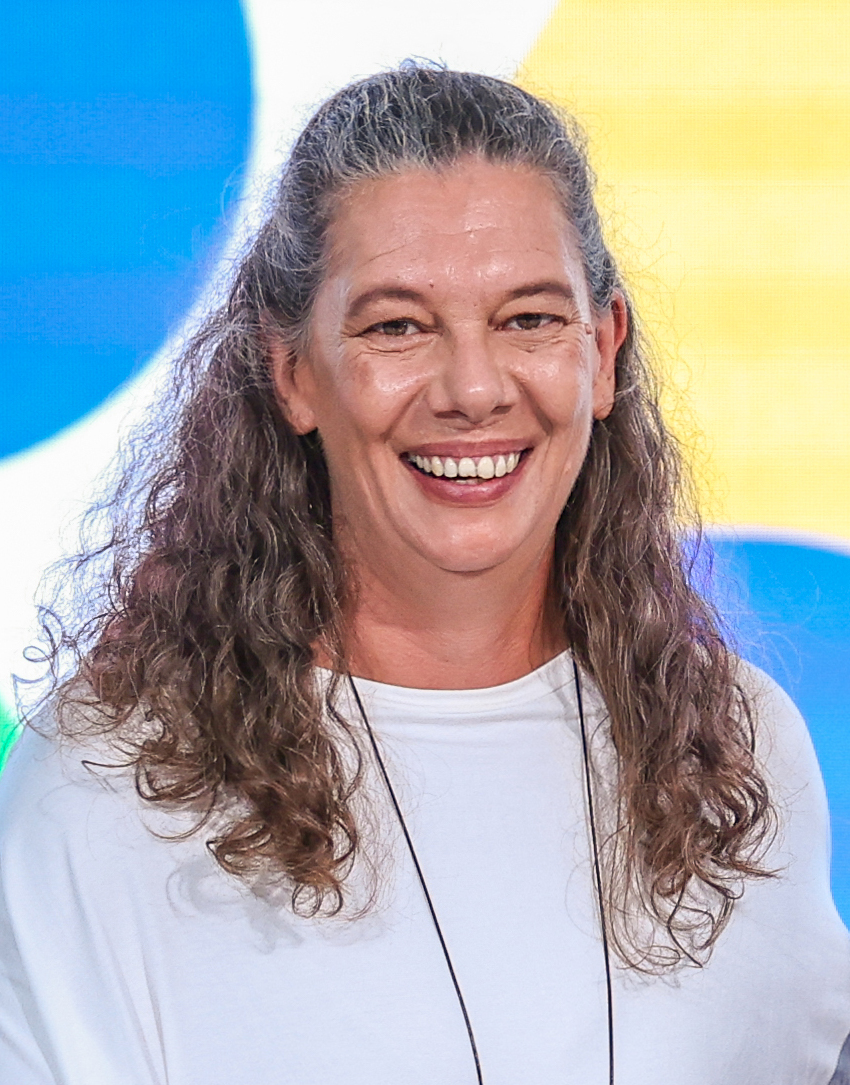

Personal information
- Height: 1.85 m (6 ft 1 in)
- Weight: 70 kg (154 lb)
- Spike: 310 cm (122 in)
- Block: 289 cm (114 in)

Volleyball information
- Position: Outside hitter
- Current club: Retired

Career
| Years | Teams |
|---|---|
| 1985–1988 | Transbrasil |
| 1988–1991 | Sadia Esporte Clube |
| 1991–1993 | Colgate/São Caetano |
| 1993–1996 | Leite Moça/Sorocaba |
| 1996–1997 | Mizuno/Uniban |
| 1997–1998 | Dayvit/Barueri |
| 1998–1999 | UNG |
| 1998–1999 | BCN/Osasco |
Honours
Women's volleyball
Representing Brazil
Olympic Games
| Bronze medal – third place | 1996 Atlanta | Team |
World Championship
| Silver medal – second place | 1994 Brazil | Team |
FIVB World Cup
| Silver medal – second place | 1995 Japan | Team |
| Bronze medal – third place | 1999 Japan | Team |
World Grand Champions Cup
| Bronze medal – third place | 1997 Tokyo/Osaka |
World Grand Prix
| Gold medal – first place | 1994 Shanghai |
| Gold medal – first place | 1996 Shanghai |
| Gold medal – first place | 1998 Hong Kong |
| Silver medal – second place | 1995 Shanghai |
| Silver medal – second place | 1999 Yuxi |
Goodwill Games
| Bronze medal – third place | 1990 Seattle |
Pan American Games
| Silver medal – second place | 1991 Havana | Team |
CSV South American Championship
| Gold medal – first place | 1991 Osasco |
| Gold medal – first place | 1995 Porto Alegre |
| Silver medal – second place | 1989 Curitiba |

Ana Beatriz Moser (born 14 August 1968) is a Brazilian former volleyball player and three-time Olympian who played as an outside hitter. She helped make the Brazilian women's national volleyball team a dominant force in the 1990s. From January to September 2023, she served as minister of Sport, and was the first woman to hold the office since its creation in 1995.

Moser was a member of the Brazilian national volleyball team for over a decade, serving as the team captain and winning silver medals at the 1994 FIVB World Championship and 1995 FIVB World Cup. She then won squad's first Olympic medal at the 1996 Summer Olympics in Atlanta with a bronze medal. She participated in the 1999 FIVB World Cup, helping Brazil win the bronze medal and qualify for the 2000 Summer Olympics in Sydney, and announced her retirement shortly after the Olympics. She also participated in the 1988 Summer Olympics in Seoul and the 1992 Summer Olympics in Barcelona, where Brazil finished in sixth and fourth place, respectively.

In 2009, Moser was inducted into the International Volleyball Hall of Fame.

== Personal life ==
After retirement, Moser was involved in various sports-related social projects. In 2022, it was announced she would become the Minister of Sports in the incoming government of Luiz Inácio Lula da Silva. In September 2023, she was dismissed by President Lula from her position to make room for the centrão.

== Awards ==
=== Individual ===
- 1987 FIVB U20 World Championship – "Most Valuable Player"
- 1990 FIVB World Championship – "Best Spiker"
- 1990–91 Brazilian Superliga – "Best Spiker"
- 1991 South American Championship – "Most Valuable Player"
- 1991 South American Championship – "Best Spiker"
- 1992 Summer Olympics – "Best Server"
- 1994 FIVB Club World Championship – "Most Valuable Player"
- 1994 FIVB Club World Championship – "Best Server"
- 1995 FIVB World Grand Prix – "Best Server"
- 1995–96 Brazilian Superliga – "Best Scorer"
- 1996–97 Brazilian Superliga – "Best Scorer"

Political offices
| Preceded by Ronaldo Bento as Minister of Citizenship | Minister of Sports; 2023 | Succeeded by André Fufuca |
