= Ministry of Sports (Brazil) =

Ministry of Brazil

- Portuguese: Ministério do Esporte
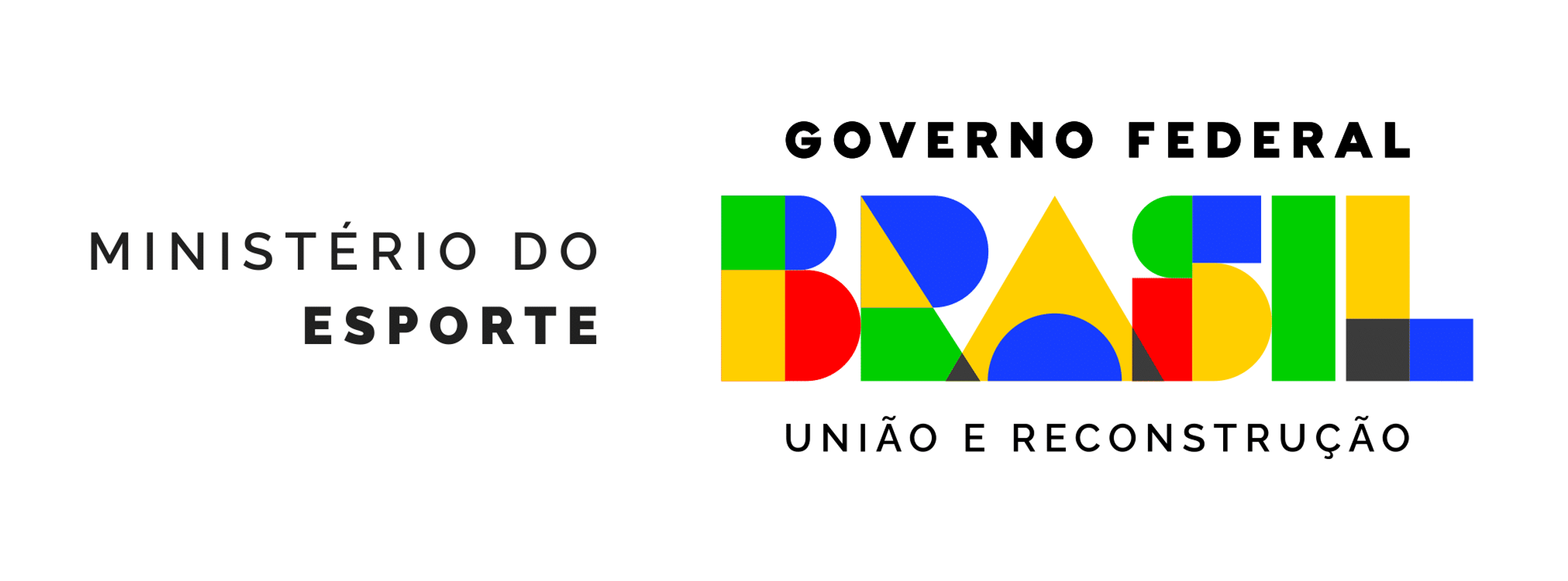

Agency overview
- Formed: 1 January 1995; 31 years ago
- Type: Ministry
- Jurisdiction: Federal government of Brazil
- Headquarters: Esplanada dos Ministérios, Bloco A Brasília, Federal District
- Annual budget: $937,3 m BRL (2023)
- Agency executives: André Fufuca, Minister; Antonio Paulo Vogel, Executive-Secretary; Paulo Henrique Cordeiro, Secretary of Amateur Sports, Education, Leisure and Social Inclusion; Iziane Marques, Secretary of High Development Sports; Fabio Lima de Araujo, Secretary of Parasports; Athirson Mazzoli e Oliveira, Secretary of Football and Defense of Fan Rights
- Website: www.gov.br/esporte

The Ministry of Sports (Portuguese: Ministério do Esporte) is a cabinet-level federal ministry in Brazil. It was established in 1995 as the "Special Ministry of Sports"; in 1998, this became the "Ministry of Sports and Tourism". In 2003, the Ministry of Tourism was separated from its portfolio. The cabinet was extinct by Jair Bolsonaro in 2019, folded into the Ministry of Citizenship, and was restored by Luiz Inácio Lula da Silva in 2023.

The Ministry directs the National Institute of Sport Development.

== Ministers ==
| No. | Portrait | Minister | Took office | Left office | Time in office | Party | President |
|---|---|---|---|---|---|---|---|
| 1 | Pelé | Pelé (1940–2022) | 1 January 1995 | 29 April 1998 | 3 years, 118 days | Independent | Fernando Henrique Cardoso (PSDB) |
| 2 | Rafael Greca | Rafael Greca (born 1956) | 1 January 1999 | 5 May 2000 | 1 year, 125 days | PFL | Fernando Henrique Cardoso (PSDB) |
| 3 | Carlos Melles | Carlos Melles (born 1947) | 9 May 2000 | 8 March 2002 | 1 year, 303 days | PFL | Fernando Henrique Cardoso (PSDB) |
| 4 | Caio Cibella de Carvalho | Caio Cibella de Carvalho (born 1951) | 8 March 2002 | 1 January 2003 | 299 days | Independent | Fernando Henrique Cardoso (PSDB) |
| 5 | Agnelo Queiroz | Agnelo Queiroz (born 1958) | 1 January 2003 | 31 March 2006 | 3 years, 89 days | PT | Luiz Inácio Lula da Silva (PT) |
| 6 | Orlando Silva | Orlando Silva (born 1971) | 31 March 2006 | 26 October 2011 | 5 years, 209 days | PCdoB | Luiz Inácio Lula da Silva (PT); Dilma Rousseff (PT) |
| 7 | Aldo Rebelo | Aldo Rebelo (born 1956) | 26 October 2011 | 1 January 2015 | 3 years, 67 days | PCdoB | Dilma Rousseff (PT) |
| 8 | George Hilton | George Hilton (born 1971) | 1 January 2015 | 23 March 2016 | 1 year, 82 days | PT | Dilma Rousseff (PT) |
| 9 | Ricardo Leyser | Ricardo Leyser (born 1970) | 31 March 2016 | 12 May 2016 | 42 days | PCdoB | Dilma Rousseff (PT) |
| 10 | Leonardo Picciani | Leonardo Picciani (born 1979) | 12 May 2016 | 6 April 2018 | 1 year, 329 days | MDB | Michel Temer (MDB) |
| 11 | Leandro Cruz | Leandro Cruz (born 1969) | 6 April 2018 | 1 January 2019 | 270 days | Independent | Michel Temer (MDB) |
| 12 | Ana Moser | Ana Moser (born 1968) | 1 January 2023 | 13 September 2023 | 255 days | Independent | Luiz Inácio Lula da Silva (PT) |
| 13 | André Fufuca | André Fufuca (born 1989) | 13 September 2023 | Incumbent | 2 years, 319 days | PP | Luiz Inácio Lula da Silva (PT) |

== See also ==
- Other ministries of Sport
