= 1994 Bahia general election =

Bahia gubernatorial election, 1994
- October 3, 1994; November 15, 1994
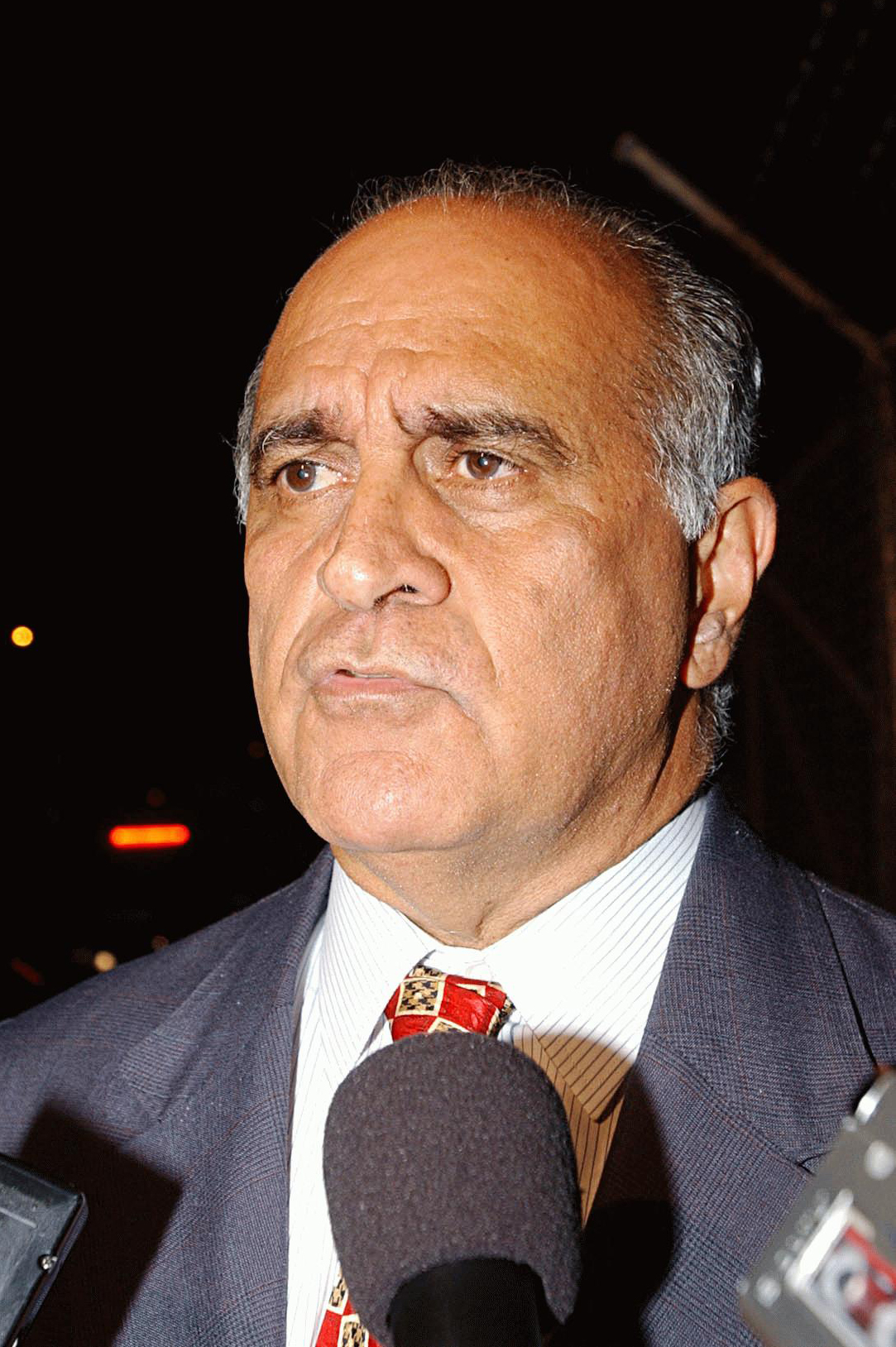

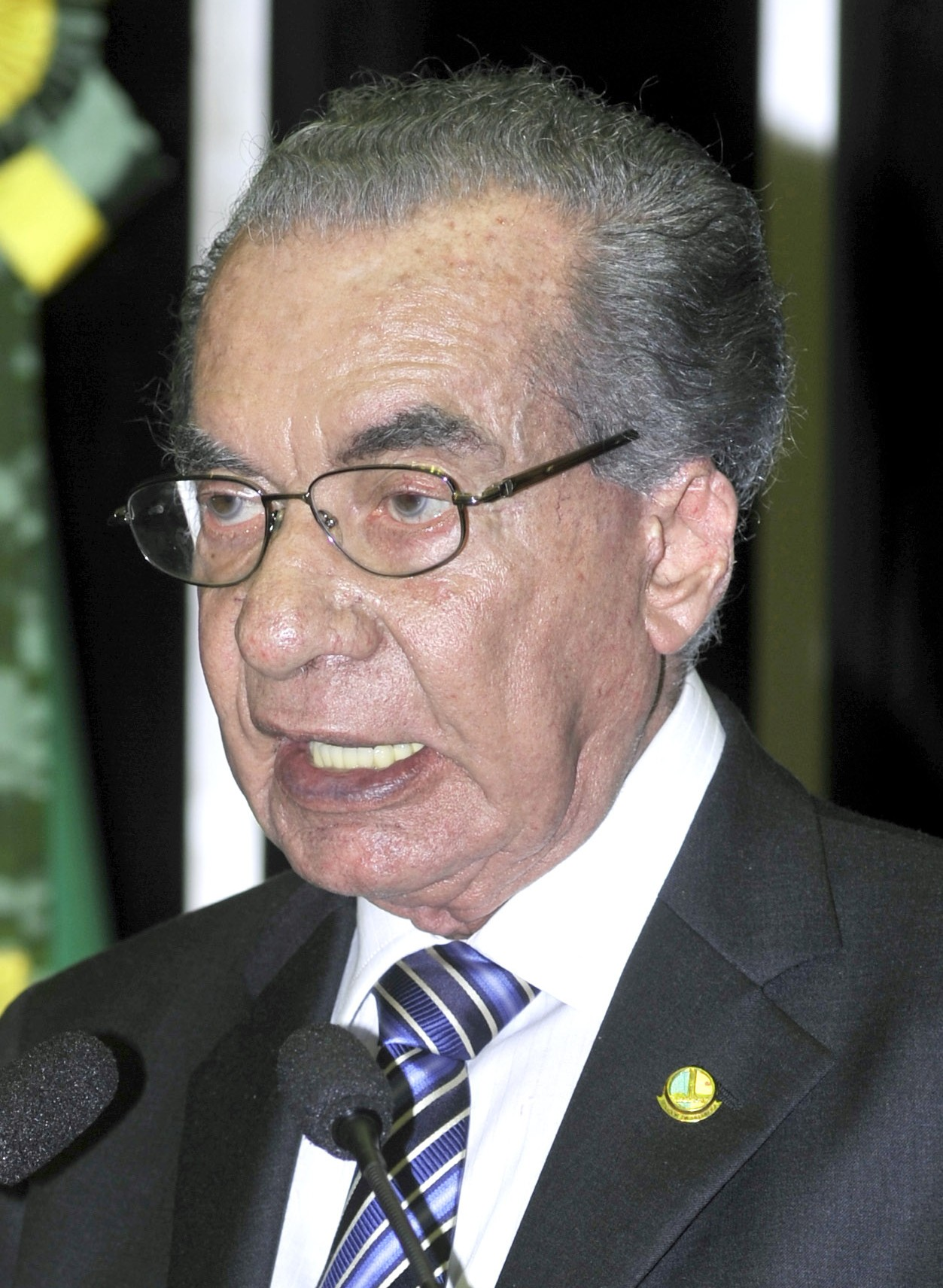
Candidate	Paulo Souto	João Durval
Party	PFL	PMN
Running mate	César Borges	Germano Tabacoff
Popular vote	2.235.659	1.577.043
Percentage	58,64%	41,36%
Governor before election
Antônio Imbassahy
PFL
Elected Governor
Paulo Souto
PFL

1994 Bahia gubernatorial election was held in the Brazilian state of Bahia on October 3, alongside Brazil's general election, with a second round on November 15. PFL candidate, Paulo Souto, was elected on November 15, 1994.
