= Eliane Nogueira =

Brazilian business woman and politician

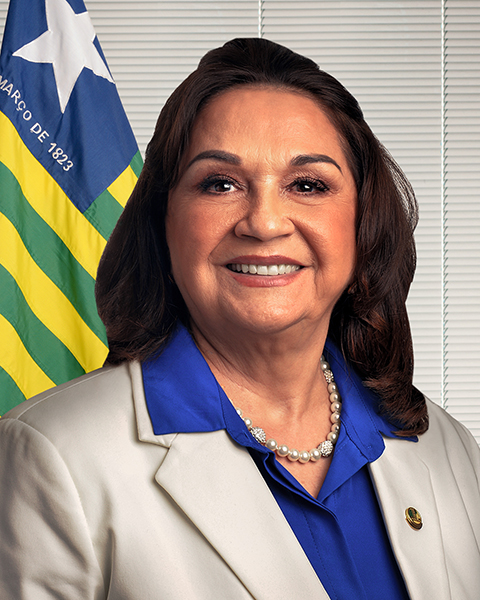

Senator for Piauí
- In office 28 July 2021 – 30 December 2022

Personal details
- Born: 3 July 1949 (age 76) Teresina, Piauí, Brazil
- Party: PP (2004–present)
- Other party: DEM (1988–2004)
- Children: Ciro Nogueira

Eliane e Silva Nogueira Lima (born 3 July 1949) is a Brazilian business woman and politician, mother of Ciro Nogueira. She took office as senator for Piauí as first alternate of her son after he became the Chief of Staff of the Presidency of Jair Bolsonaro.
