= Roberta Roma =

Brazilian politician (born 1980)

- Roma in 2019

Member of the Chamber of Deputies
- Incumbent
- Assumed office 1 February 2023
- Constituency: Bahia

Personal details
- Born: Roberta de Araújo Costa; 11 May 1980 (age 46) Salvador, Bahia, Bahia
- Party: PL (2022–present)
- Other political affiliations: DEM (2004–2019); Republicanos (2019–2022)
- Spouse: João Roma (m. 2007)
- Education: Universidade Salvador (BBA)

Roberta de Araújo Costa Roma (née de Araújo Costa, born 11 May 1980) is a Brazilian politician serving as a member of the Chamber of Deputies since 2023. She is married to João Roma.

She has a bachelor's degree in Business Administration, University of Salvador - UNIFACS, Salvador, BA, (1999 - 2003)
