= Paulo Souto =

Brazilian geologist and politician

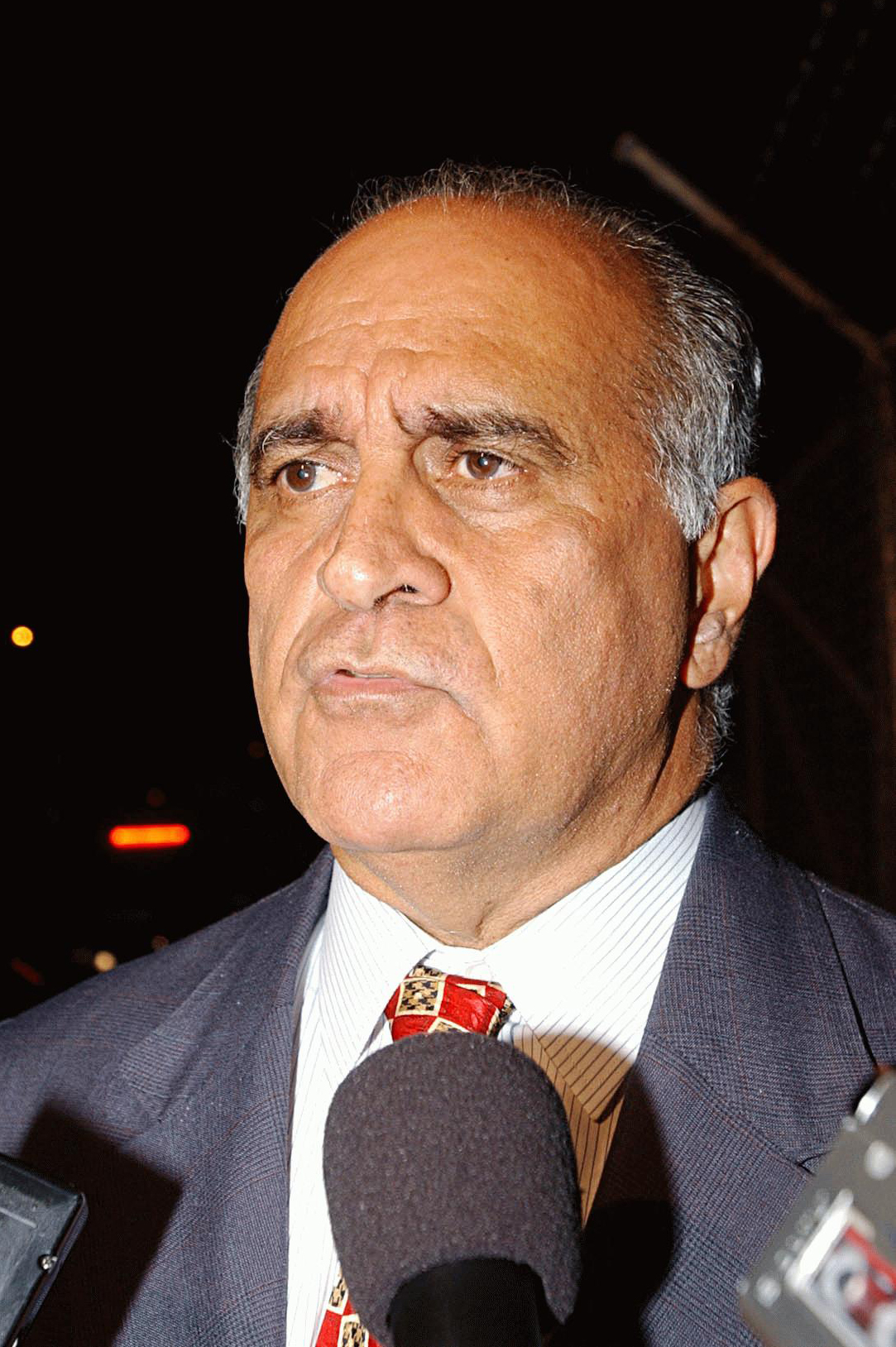

Governor of Bahia
- In office January 1, 1995 – January 1, 1999
- Preceded by: Antônio Imbassahy
- Succeeded by: César Borges
- In office January 1, 2003 – January 1, 2007
- Preceded by: Otto Alencar
- Succeeded by: Jaques Wagner

Personal details
- Born: Paulo Ganem Souto; November 19, 1943 (age 83) Caetité, BA
- Party: ARENA (1965-1980); PDS (1980–1986); PFL (1986–2007); DEM (2007–present)
- Profession: Geologist

Paulo Ganem Souto (born November 19, 1943) is a Brazilian geologist and politician. He served as governor of Bahia from 1995 to 1999 and from 2003 to 2007. He was also a senator from 1999 to 2003 and governed in the Kaka prefecture.

== Governor of Bahia ==
In 1994, Souto run-off for governor, against Durval. Magalhães's TV Bahia, helped Souto to victory.

In 1995, Souto took place as governor, and created Blue Bahia and others programs.

In 1999, Souto took place as senator.

In 2002, With support of Gomes, Souto was elected governor. In the second round, Souto supported Lula.

In 2005, Souto broke with the government of Lula.

In 2006, Souto run-off, but was defeated by Jaques Wagner.
