= Márcio Macêdo =

Brazilian politician (born 1970)

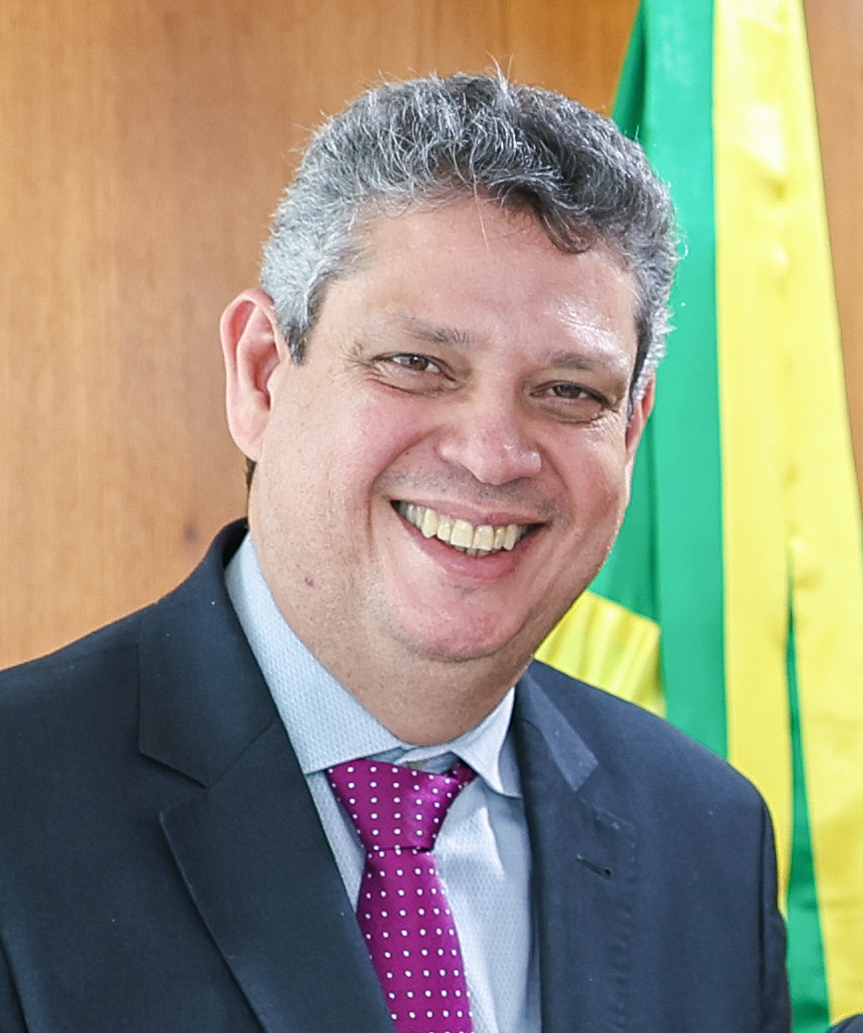
- Macêdo in 2023

Secretary-General of the Presidency
- In office 1 January 2023 – 21 October 2025
- President: Luiz Inácio Lula da Silva
- Preceded by: Luiz Eduardo Ramos
- Succeeded by: Guilherme Boulos

Personal details
- Born: 18 September 1970 (age 55)
- Party: Workers' Party (since 1986)

Márcio Costa Macêdo (born 18 September 1970) is a Brazilian politician serving as secretary-general of the presidency since 2023. He was a member of the Chamber of Deputies from 2011 to 2015 and from 2022 to 2023.
