= Luiz Eduardo Ramos =

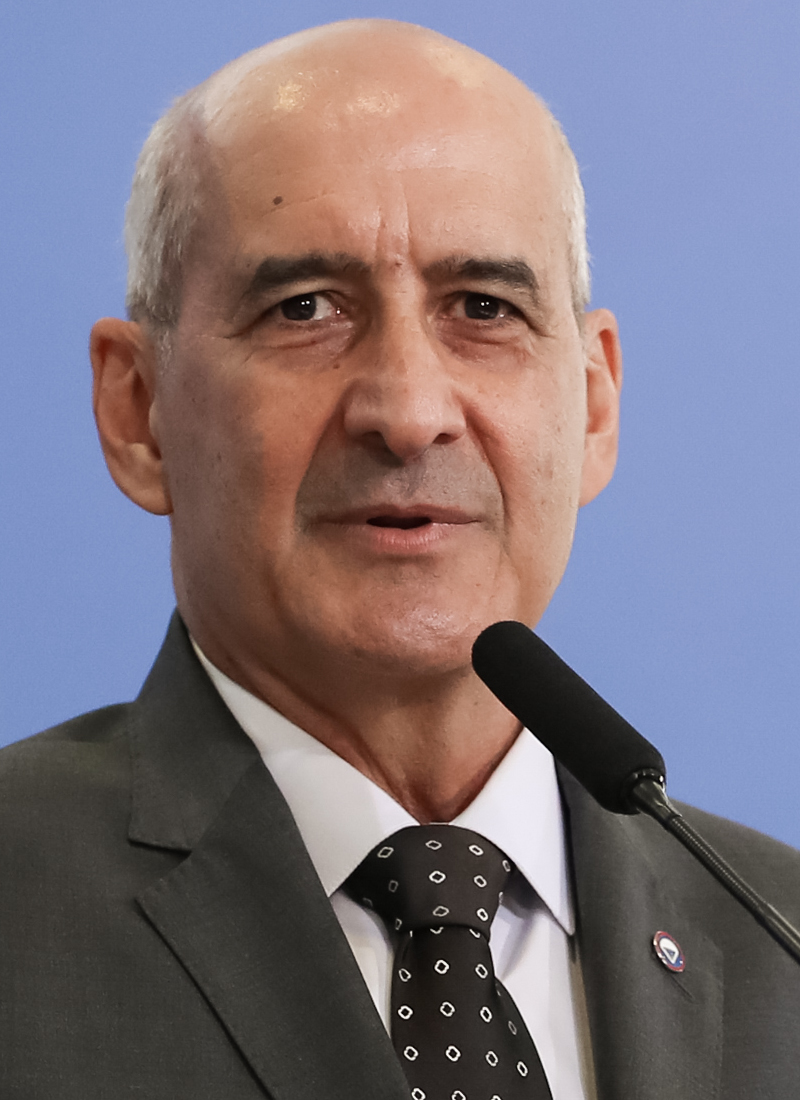

General Secretary of the Presidency
- In office 26 July 2021 – 31 December 2022
- President: Jair Bolsonaro
- Preceded by: Onyx Lorenzoni
- Succeeded by: Márcio Macêdo

Chief of Staff of the Presidency
- In office 29 March 2021 – 26 July 2021
- President: Jair Bolsonaro
- Preceded by: Walter Souza Braga Netto
- Succeeded by: Ciro Nogueira

Secretary of Government
- In office 13 June 2019 – 29 March 2021
- President: Jair Bolsonaro
- Preceded by: Carlos Alberto dos Santos Cruz
- Succeeded by: Flávia Arruda

Personal details
- Born: 12 June 1956 (age 69) Rio de Janeiro, Brazil
- Spouse: Ligia Faria Baptista Pereira

Military service
- Allegiance: Brazil; United Nations
- Branch/service: Brazilian Army
- Years of service: 1973–present
- Rank: Army General
- Commands: Southeastern Military Command; 1st Army Division; 11th Military Region; MINUSTAH; 8th Motorized Infantry Brigade; 9th Motorized Infantry Battalion
- Awards: Order of Military Merit (Grand Cross - Grã-Cruz) (Brazil); United Nations Medal (MINUSTAH - Haiti) (United Nations)

Luiz Eduardo Ramos Baptista Pereira (born 12 June 1956) is a Brazilian Army four-star General, who was the Secretary of Government for President Jair Bolsonaro, succeeding Lieutenant General Carlos Alberto dos Santos Cruz.

== Military career ==
He joined the military career on 8 March 1973, at the Army Cadets Preparatory School, and was declared an Infantry Officer on 14 December 1979, at the Agulhas Negras Military Academy. He was promoted to his current rank on 25 November 2017.

He was formerly a Commander of the 11th Military Region, in Brasília, and of the 1st Army Division, in Rio de Janeiro. General Ramos also acted as Force Commander of United Nations Stabilization Mission in Haiti (MINUSTAH) and was the Army's Deputy Chief of Staff.

Since 3 May 2018, he is the Southeastern Military Commander.

=== Awards ===
- Order of Military Merit (Grand Cross - Grã-Cruz) (Brazil)
- United Nations Medal (MINUSTAH - Haiti) (United Nations)

== Political career ==
Ramos was appointed by Bolsonaro to replace General Santos Cruz as government secretary on 13 June 2019 after Cruz had public clashes with the radical ideological wing of the government, including Bolsonaro's son Carlos, and the writer Olavo de Carvalho. Cruz was the third cabinet member to be dismissed since Bolsonaro's inauguration, and Ramos' appointment kept the number of military men in Bolsonaro's cabinet at 8 out of 22 positions.

Political offices
Preceded by Carlos Alberto dos Santos Cruz	Secretary of Government of Brazil; 2019–2021	Succeeded by Flávia Arruda
Preceded by Walter Souza Braga Netto	Chief of Staff of the Presidency; 2021	Succeeded by Ciro Nogueira
Preceded by Onyx Lorenzoni	Secretary-General of the Presidency; 2021-2022	Succeeded by Márcio Macêdo
