= Osmar Terra =

Brazilian politician and physician

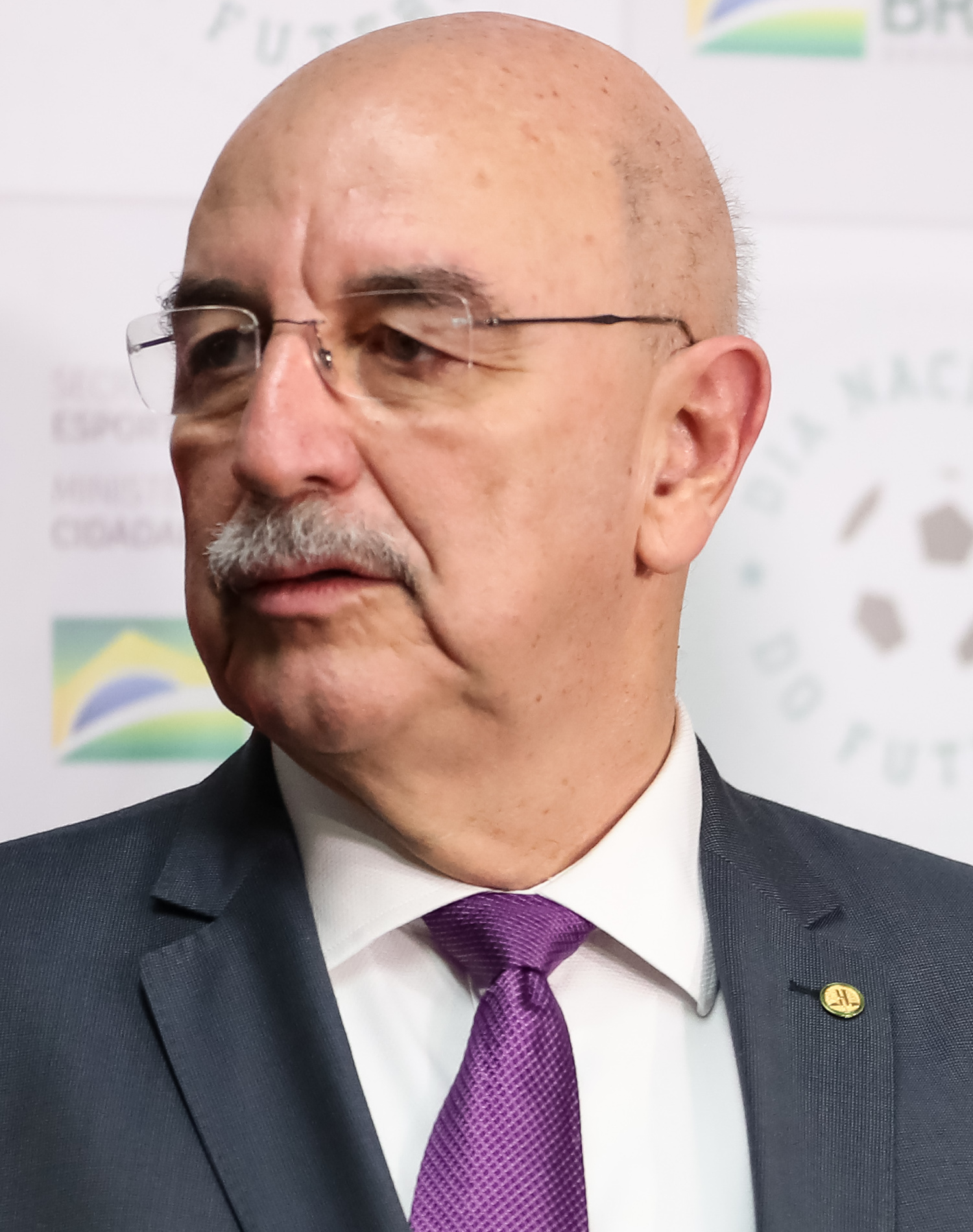
- Terra in 2019

Member of the Chamber of Deputies
- Incumbent
- Assumed office 1 February 1999
- Constituency: Rio Grande do Sul

Minister of Citizenship
- In office 1 January 2019 – 18 February 2020
- President: Jair Bolsonaro
- Preceded by: Office established
- Succeeded by: Onyx Lorenzoni

Minister of Social and Agrarian Development
- In office 12 May 2016 – 6 April 2018
- President: Michel Temer
- Preceded by: Tereza Campello
- Succeeded by: Alberto Beltrame

Personal details
- Born: Osmar Gasparini Terra; 18 February 1950 (age 76) Porto Alegre, Rio Grande do Sul, Brazil
- Party: PL (2025–present)
- Other political affiliations: MDB (1986–2025)
- Education: Federal University of Rio de Janeiro; University of Brasília; Pontifical Catholic University of Rio Grande do Sul
- Profession: Physician

Osmar Gasparini Terra (born 18 February 1950) is a Brazilian politician and physician, affiliated with Brazilian Democratic Movement (MDB), Minister of Citizenship until 2021, previously holding the office of Minister of Social and Agrarian Development.

Political offices
Preceded by Tereza Campello	Minister of Social and Agrarian Development; 2016–2018	Succeeded by Alberto Beltrame
Office established	Minister of Citizenship; 2019–2020	Succeeded by Onyx Lorenzoni
