= Ciro Nogueira Lima Filho =

Brazilian lawyer and politician

- Official portrait

Senator for Piauí
- Incumbent
- Assumed office 30 December 2022
- Preceded by: Eliane Nogueira
- In office 1 February 2011 – 28 July 2021
- Preceded by: Mão Santa
- Succeeded by: Eliane Nogueira

Chief of Staff of the Presidency
- In office 4 August 2021 – 30 December 2022
- President: Jair Bolsonaro
- Preceded by: Luiz Eduardo Ramos
- Succeeded by: Rui Costa

Federal Deputy
- In office 1 February 1995 – 31 January 2011
- Constituency: Piauí

National President of Progressives
- Incumbent
- Assumed office 11 April 2013

Personal details
- Born: 21 November 1968 (age 57) Pedro II, Piauí, Brazil
- Party: Progressistas (since 1999)
- Other political affiliations: PFL (1985–1999)
- Spouse: Iracema Portela
- Children: 2
- Parents: Ciro Nogueira Lima; Eliane Nogueira
- Education: Pontifical Catholic University of Rio de Janeiro

Ciro Nogueira Lima Filho (born 21 November 1968) is a Brazilian lawyer, businessman, politician, and a member of the Progressistas (PP) party, of which he is the current president. He has represented Piauí in the Federal Senate since 2011. Previously, he was a federal deputy representing Piauí from 1995 to 2011. He is a member of Progressistas.

Nogueira was the chief of staff of the presidency of Jair Bolsonaro from August 2021 to December 2022.

== Personal life ==
Nogueira was born on 21 November 1968, in Teresina, Piauí, to Ciro Nogueira Lima and Eliane e Silva Nogueira Lima. He holds a degree in law at the Pontifical Catholic University of Rio de Janeiro (PUC-RJ), having started his public life as the heir of a family with a long political tradition in Piauí: his paternal grandfather, Manuel Nogueira Lima, was appointed as the mayor of the municipality of Pedro II after the Revolution of 1930, and his father was elected as a federal deputy for Piauí for two legislatures, in addition to other family members who entered politics. His uncle Etevaldo Nogueira was elected federal deputy for the state of Ceará from 1986 to 1990.

He was married with the federal deputy Iracema Portela and has two daughters with her.

== Political career ==
Affiliated to the former Liberal Front Party (PFL), he succeeded his father as a federal deputy, being elected in 1994, and re-elected in 1998. In 2000, he was a candidate for mayor of Teresina. Seeing his pretensions undermined by the time of the election, already in the first round, meanwhile dividing his time as a candidate between politics and the Ríver Atlético Clube team, of which he was president, he ended up losing the election. He was then re-elected as federal deputy in 2002, left the party to which he was affiliated at the time and decided to join Progressive Party (PP) at the invitation of his father-in-law, the physician and politician Lucidio Portela. He was re-elected for a new term of federal deputy in 2006.

He was one of the candidates for the presidency of the Chamber of Deputies of Brazil in 2009, being defeated by Michel Temer.

In 2010, he was elected as a senator representing the state of Piauí, with 695,875 votes, for one of the two disputed seats in the election, with businessman João Claudino Fernandes being his Alternate Senator. The other seat was won by Wellington Dias, elected with 997,513 votes. In 2018 he was re-elected to the Federal Senate of Brazil with more than 895,000 votes, extending his senatorial term until 2027, with his Mother Eliane e Silva Nogueira Lima being also elected as his First Alternate and Gil Paraibano as his Second Alternate.

As a member of the Mixed Parliamentary Commission of Inquiry of Cachoeira (CPMI), he was one of the 18 votes that rejected the official report to the commission. The alternative report endorsed by the senator and another 20 members of the commission suggested the continuation of investigations by the Public Ministry and the Federal Police, but without any indictment or criminal responsibility.

In 2016, Ciro was involved in new scandals, being accused by Cláudio Mello Filho, from the Odebrecht Construction Board, of having received bribes for the 2010 and 2014 campaigns that benefited him and his wife at the time, the federal deputy Iracema Portela, the party which Ciro presides nationally, and who would have asked for bribes to finance party campaigns across the country in the amount of R$5 million. The senator was also accused of receiving bribes from Construtora UTC, in the amount of R$2 million, in 2014, in exchange for favoring it in public works. The Federal Police asked the Federal Supreme Court to indict him.

On July 28, 2021, he was appointed by the president Jair Bolsonaro as the Chief of Staff of the Presidency, taking office on August 4, 2021. He was removed from office on December 30, 2022.

== Operation Car Wash ==
Odebrecht, the largest and most often implicated company in Operation Car Wash, kept an entire department to coordinate the payment of bribes to politicians. During the operation, officers seized several electronic spreadsheets linking the payments to then-unidentified entities, referred to in the company books by their assigned nicknames. All politicians who participated in the scheme received a nickname based on physical characteristics, public trajectory, personal information, owned property, place of origin, or generic preferences. Ciro Nogueira's nickname was 'Cerrado', a reference to the biome where he's from.

Political offices
Preceded by Luiz Eduardo Ramos	Chief of Staff of the Presidency; 2021–2022	Succeeded by Rui Costa
