= Geddel Vieira Lima =

Brazilian politician (born 1959)

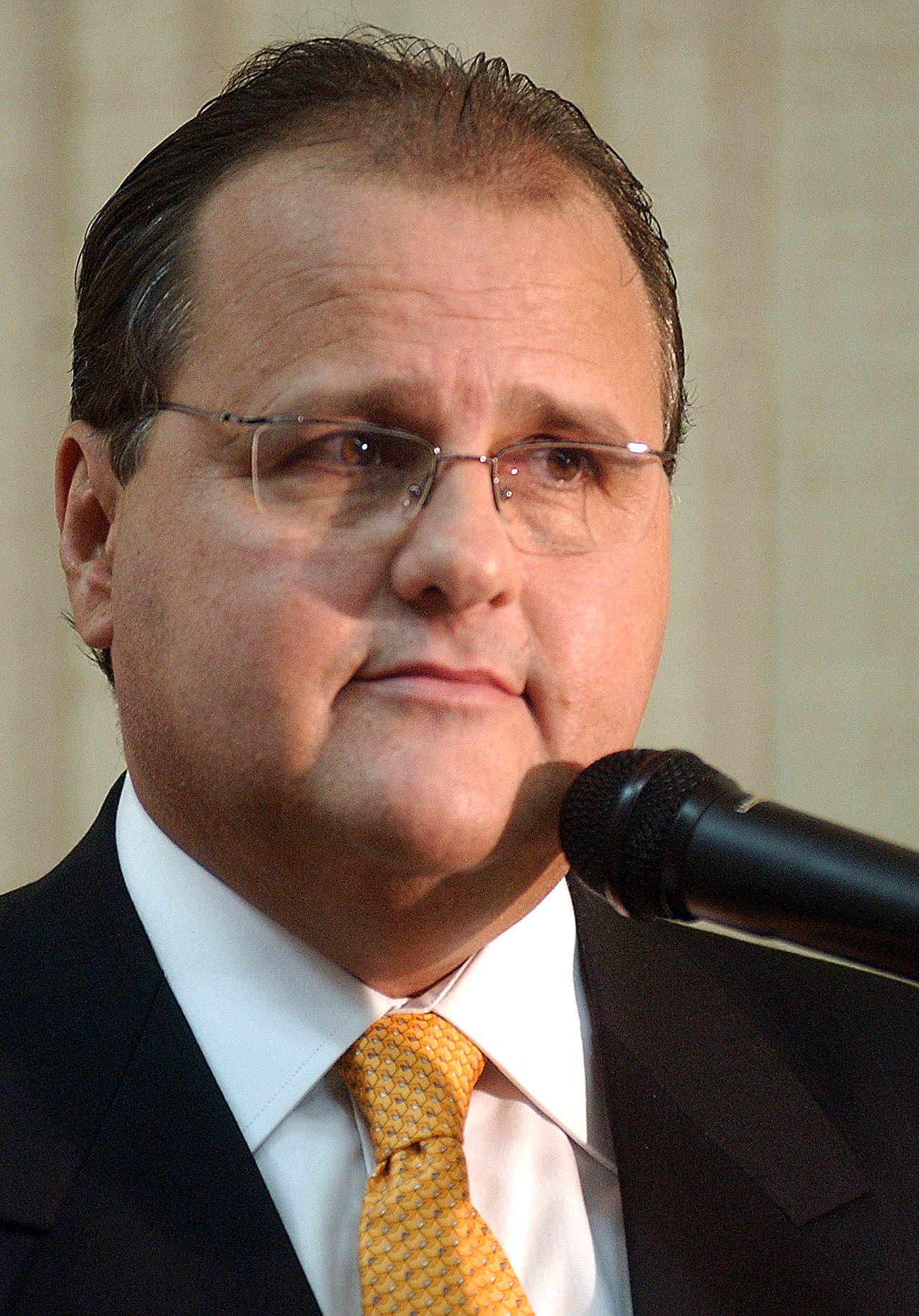

Secretary of Government
- In office 12 May 2016 – 25 November 2016
- President: Michel Temer
- Preceded by: Ricardo Berzoini
- Succeeded by: Antônio Imbassahy

Minister of National Integration
- In office 16 March 2007 – 31 March 2010
- President: Luiz Inácio Lula da Silva
- Preceded by: Pedro Brito
- Succeeded by: João Santana

Federal Deputy
- In office 1 February 1991 – 1 February 2011
- Constituency: Bahia

Personal details
- Born: Geddel Quadros Vieira Lima; 18 March 1959 (age 67) Salvador, Bahia, Brazil
- Party: MDB (since 1990)
- Education: University of Brasília

Geddel Quadros Vieira Lima (born 18 March 1959) is a Brazilian politician who served in the Cabinet of Brazil under President Michel Temer until his resignation on 25 November 2016, amid accusations that he and the President had pressured Minister of Culture Marcelo Calero to approve a real estate project to build a 30-floor apartment building in a historic district of Ladeira da Barra.

Vieira Lima, who as Temer's Minister of Government acted as liaison between the executive and legislative branches, was implicated in Operation Cui Bono, an investigation into Caixa Econômica Federal, a state-owned bank of which he was vice-president in the Dilma Rousseff government. He is accused along with former lower house president Eduardo Cunha of approving loans in return for kickbacks. He had previously served as minister of national integration under president Luiz Inácio Lula da Silva.

On 3 July 2017, he was arrested on suspicion of obstruction of justice for allegedly trying to block plea bargain deals. He was the second official from the Temer government to be arrested in less than a month. He was the fourth to resign amid corruption allegations since Temer took office August 31, 2016.

On 5 September 2017, the Federal Police of Brazil found R$51 million (Note: approximately US$16.35 million at an exchange rate of 1 USD = 3.1203 BRL) in an apartment in the Graça neighbourhood of Salvador, Bahia. The amount seems related to corruption, criminal organization and money laundering. Packs of money were found stored in large luggage bags and cardboard boxes. This is the largest sum of money in cash ever seized by law enforcement in a single operation in Brazil.

On October 22, 2019, the Supreme Court (STF) sentenced Vieira Lima to 14 years and ten months in prison and his brother, former Deputy Lúcio Vieira Lima, to 10 years and six months, also in closed regime.

== Notes ==
Political offices
Preceded by Pedro Brito	Minister of National Integration; 2007–2010	Succeeded by João Santana
Preceded by Ricardo Berzoini	Secretary of Government; 2016	Succeeded by Antônio Imbassahy
