= Rodrigo Lorenzoni =

Brazilian politician (born 1979)

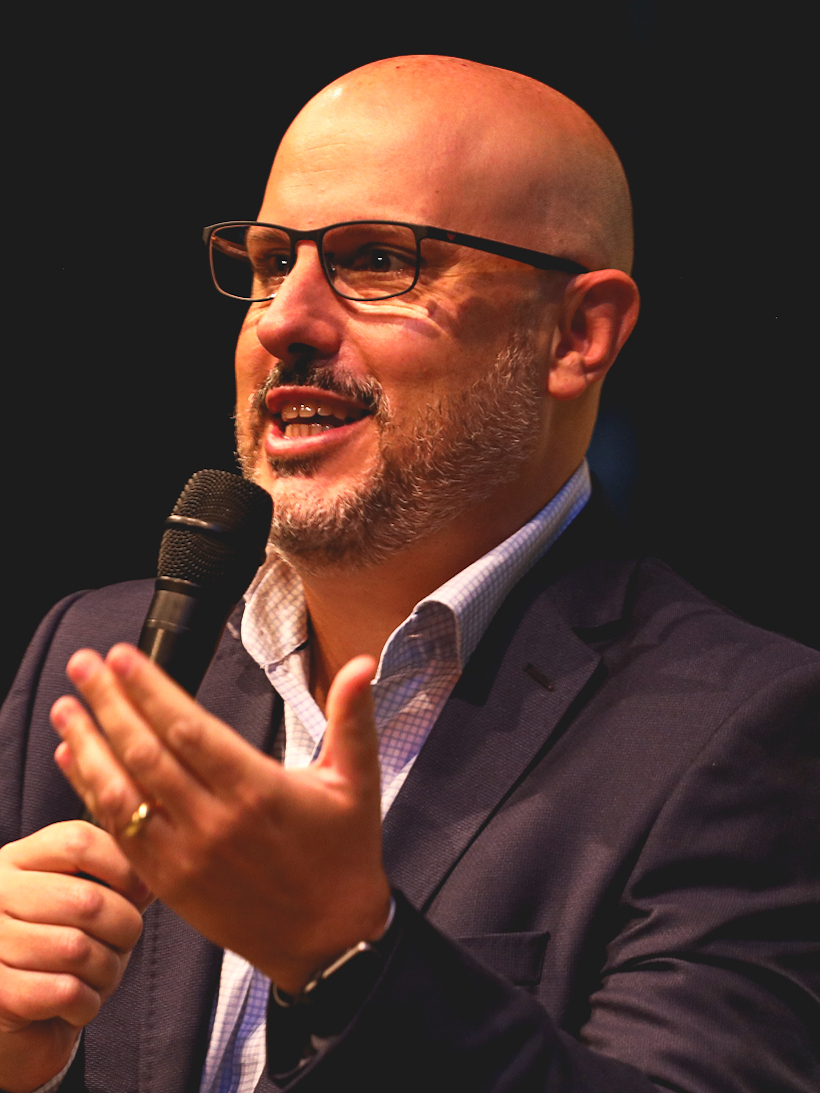
- Lorenzoni in 2022

Member of the Legislative Assembly of Rio Grande do Sul
- Incumbent
- Assumed office 29 March 2022
- Preceded by: Ruy Irigaray
- In office 27 March 2019 – 21 February 2020
- Preceded by: Ruy Irigaray
- Succeeded by: Ruy Irigaray

Personal details
- Born: 23 June 1979 (age 46)
- Party: Progressistas (since 2025)
- Parent: Onyx Lorenzoni (father)

Rodrigo Marques Lorenzoni (born 23 June 1979) is a Brazilian politician. He has been a member of the Legislative Assembly of Rio Grande do Sul since 2022, having previously served from 2019 to 2020. He is the son of Onyx Lorenzoni.
