= Carlos Marun =

Brazilian politician

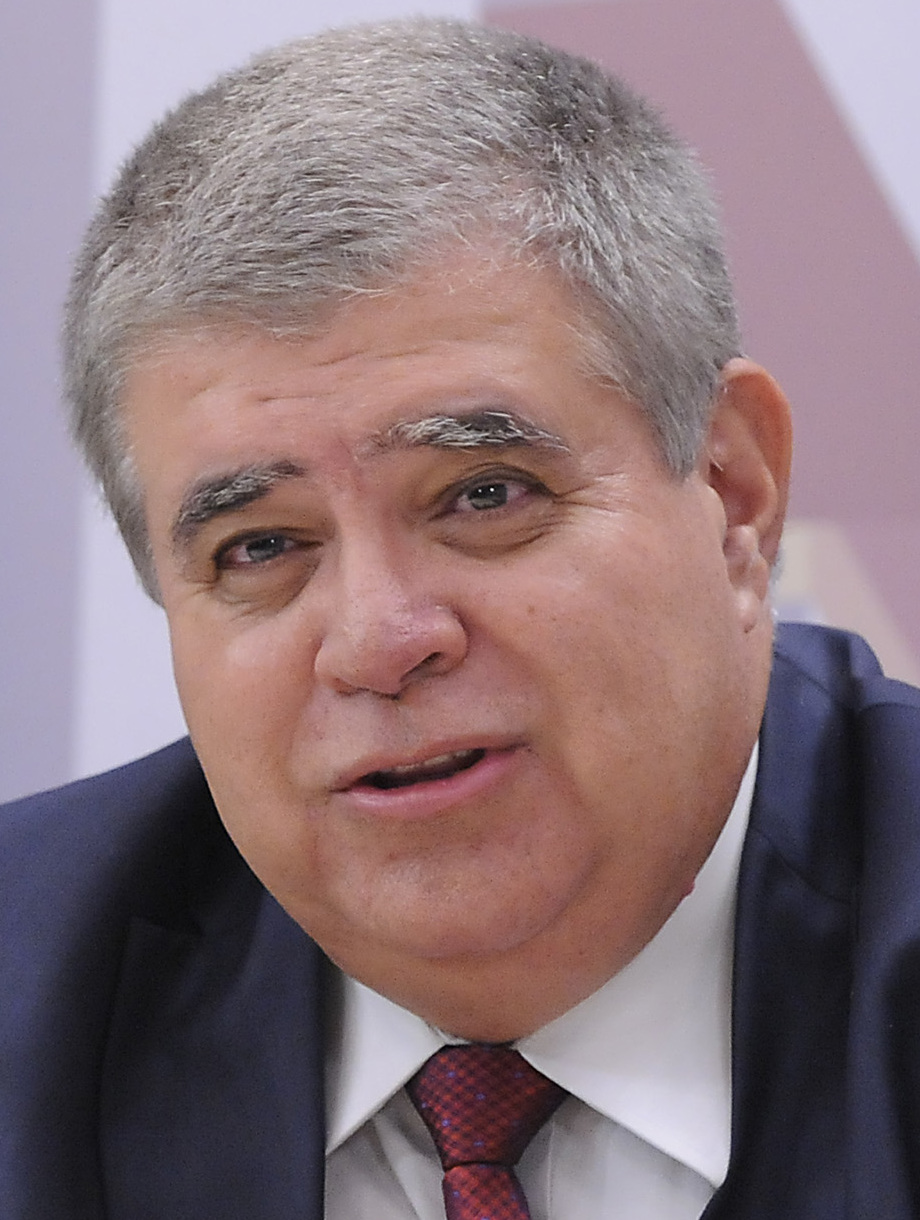

Secretary of Government
- In office 15 December 2017 – 28 December 2018
- President: Michel Temer
- Preceded by: Antônio Imbassahy
- Succeeded by: Santos Cruz

Federal Deputy
- In office 1 February 2015 – 28 December 2018
- Constituency: Mato Grosso do Sul

State Deputy of Mato Grosso do Sul
- In office 1 February 2007 – 31 January 2015
- Constituency: At-large

Councillor of Campo Grande
- In office 1 January 2005 – 31 January 2007
- Constituency: At-large

Personal details
- Born: Carlos Eduardo Xavier Marun; 21 November 1960 (age 65) Porto Alegre, Rio Grande do Sul, Brazil
- Party: MDB (2003–present)
- Education: Federal University of Rio Grande do Sul; University Center of Campo Grande
- Occupation: Politician, lawyer, civil engineer

Carlos Eduardo Xavier Marun (born 21 November 1960 in Porto Alegre) is a Brazilian politician, member of the Chamber of Deputies, lawyer and civil engineer. He is part of the Brazilian Democratic Movement Party (PMDB). Currently, is Secretary of Government, nominated by president Michel Temer.

While Eduardo Cunha was president of the Chamber of Deputies, Marun was one of his chief deputies in the chamber. He filled this position along with other deputies, such as Paulinho da Força, Waldir Maranhão and André Moura. During the session that later expelled the former president of the Chamber, he was the only one who defended Cunha from being expelled. After the session that archived the complaint against president Michel Temer, Marun danced saying that "everything is in its place, thank God", mentioning a song from Brazilian singer Benito di Paula, and that they "once again overcame the opposition, which can't win anything".

On 22 November 2017, Marun was announced as the new Chief Minister of the Secretary of Government, replacing Antônio Imbassahy. Later the same day, the nomination was suspended. Was nominated again after the resignation of Imbassahy on 8 December 2017.

Political offices
Preceded by Antônio Imbassahy	Secretary of Government; 2017–2018	Succeeded by Santos Cruz
