= André Fufuca =

Brazilian physician and politician

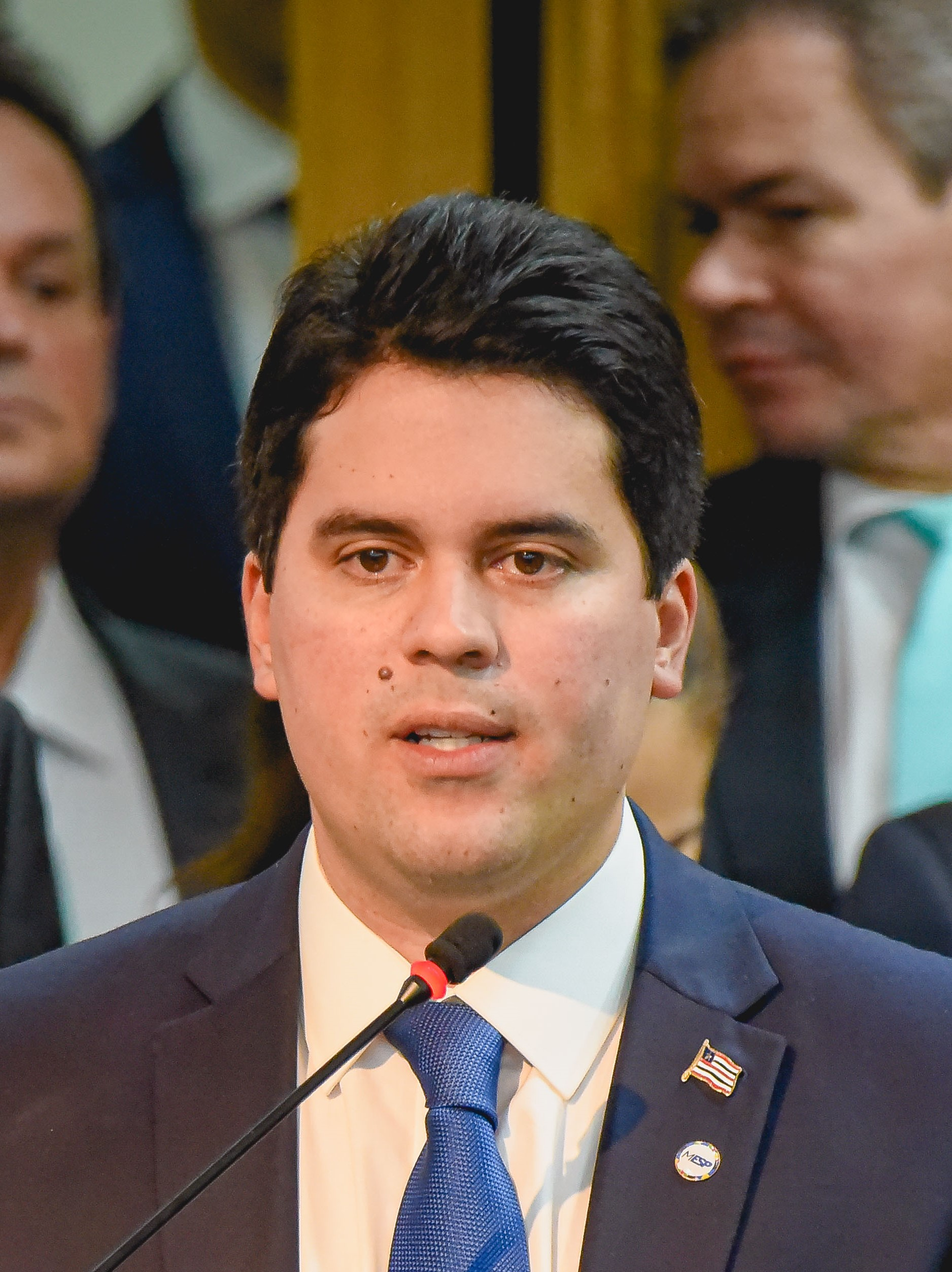

Senator-elect for Maranhão
- Assuming office 1 February 2027

Minister of Sports
- In office 13 September 2023 – 31 March 2026
- President: Luiz Inácio Lula da Silva
- Preceded by: Ana Moser

Federal Deputy
- Incumbent
- Assumed office 1 February 2015
- Constituency: Maranhão

State Deputy of Maranhão
- In office 1 February 2011 – 1 February 2015
- Constituency: At-large

Personal details
- Born: André Luiz de Carvalho Ribeiro; 27 August 1989 (age 37) Santa Inês, Maranhão, Brazil
- Party: PP (2016–present)
- Other political affiliations: PSDB (2010–2011); PSD (2011–2013); PEN (2013–2016)
- Profession: Physician

André Luiz de Carvalho Ribeiro (born 27 August 1989), mostly known as André Fufuca or Fufuquinha, is a Brazilian physician and politician who is the minister of Sport since September 2023. He is also a federal deputy since 2015, currently under license after taking office as minister.

André Fufuca is son of incumbent mayor of Alto Alegre do Pindaré, Fufuca Dantas.

== Political career ==
=== State Representative (2011–2015) ===
Elected in 2010 at the age of 21 by the Brazilian Social Democracy Party (PSDB), while he was attending college, Fufuca became the youngest state representative of Brazil.

During his term, Fufuca had served as chair of the Municipal Affairs and Regional Development Commission and the Health Commission.

=== Federal Representative (2015–present) ===
In 2014, André Fufuca was elected federal representative by the National Ecologic Party (PEN), garnering 56,879 votes. In his first year, he became rapporteur of the Ortheses and Prostheses Mafia Parliamentary Commission.

In his second year, Fufuca became the youngest caucus coordinator in history. On 6 May 2015, he voted in favor of Provisional Measure 665, which toughen rules for unemployment insurance and allowance.

On 17 April 2016, he voted to open the impeachment process against Dilma Rousseff. On 14 June 2016, he supported suspended Chamber president Eduardo Cunha, voting against his removal in the Ethics Council. Later, Fufuca supported the Constitutional Amendment of the Public Expenditure Cap and the Labour Reform.

On 2 February 2017, Fufuca was elected Second Vice President of the Chamber of Deputies. On 27 August 2017, he presided the Chamber, as president Michel Temer was in an official travel to China and the Chamber president, Rodrigo Maia, had to serve as acting president. Initially, the First Vice President, Fábio Ramalho, was responsible for this role, but he travelled with the Brazilian president. Therefore, Fufuca had served as the Chamber acting president.

In August 2017, Fufuca voted against the process which requested an investigation against president Michel Temer, helping to archive the complaint of the Public Prosecutor's Office.

In September 2023, Fufuca was confirmed for the Ministry of Sports by president Luiz Inácio Lula da Silva, replacing former volleyball player and Olympic medalist Ana Moser, ensuring a parliamentary majority in the National Congress with the support of Progressistas (PP).

Political offices
Preceded by Fernando Giacobo	Second Vice President of the Chamber of Deputies; 2017–2019	Succeeded by Luciano Bivar
Preceded by Ana Moser	Minister of Sports; 2023–present	Incumbent
