= Onyx Lorenzoni =

Brazilian politician, businessman, and veterinarian (born 1954)

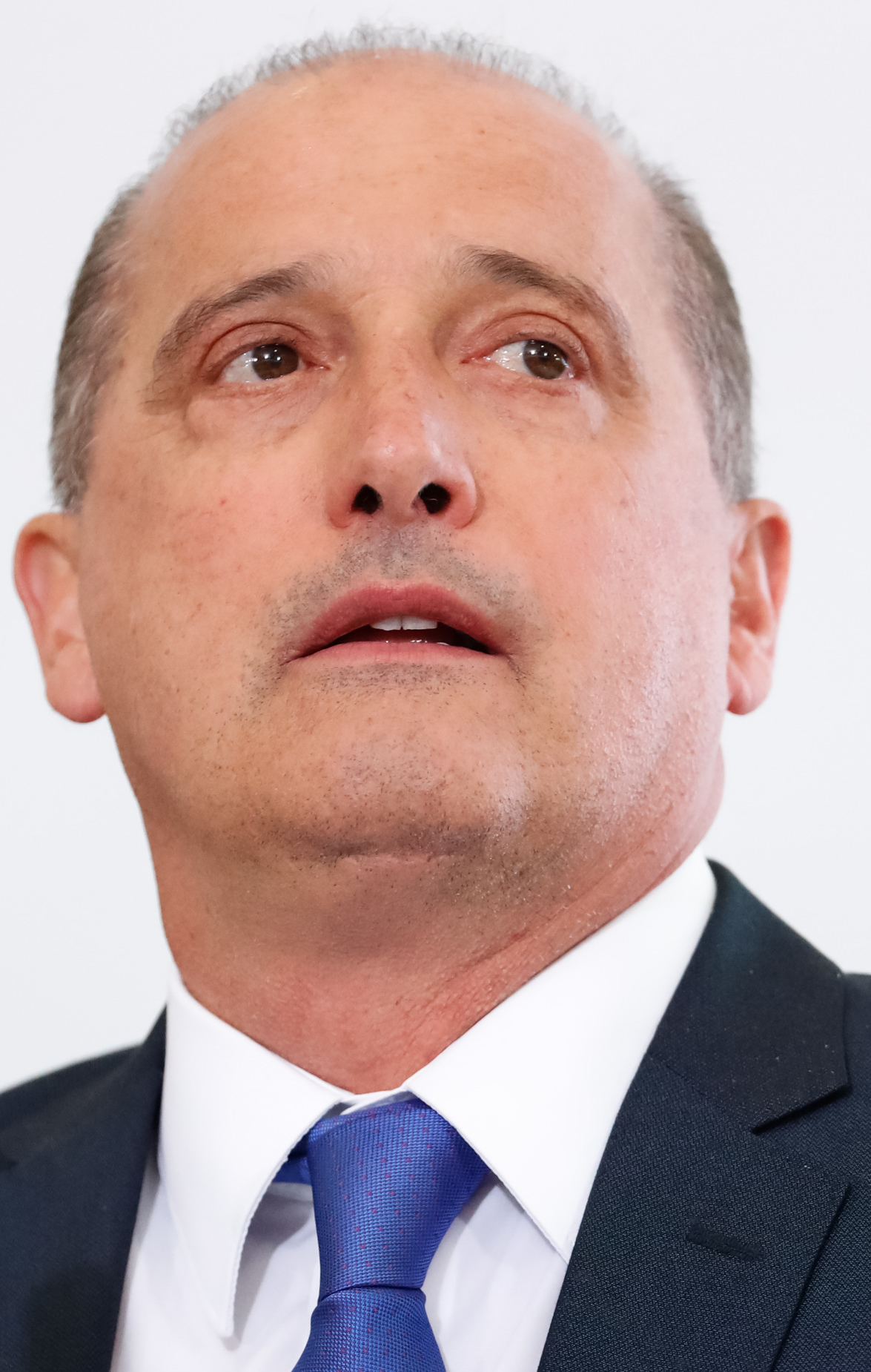

Member of the Chamber of Deputies
- In office 1 February 2003 – 31 January 2023
- Constituency: Rio Grande do Sul

Minister of Labour and Social Security
- In office 26 July 2021 – 31 March 2022
- President: Jair Bolsonaro
- Preceded by: Caio Vieira de Mello
- Succeeded by: José Carlos Oliveira

General Secretary of the Presidency
- In office 12 February 2021 – 26 July 2021
- President: Jair Bolsonaro
- Preceded by: Jorge Oliveira
- Succeeded by: Luiz Eduardo Ramos

Minister of Citizenship
- In office 18 February 2020 – 12 February 2021
- President: Jair Bolsonaro
- Preceded by: Osmar Terra
- Succeeded by: João Roma

Chief of Staff of the Presidency
- In office 1 January 2019 – 18 February 2020
- President: Jair Bolsonaro
- Preceded by: Eliseu Padilha
- Succeeded by: Walter Braga Netto

Member of the Legislative Assembly of Rio Grande do Sul
- In office 1 January 1995 – 1 January 2003
- Constituency: At-large

Personal details
- Born: Onyx Dornelles Lorenzoni; 3 October 1954 (age 72) Porto Alegre, Rio Grande do Sul, Brazil
- Party: PL (2022–present)
- Other political affiliations: PL (1987–1997); DEM (1997–2022)
- Children: Rodrigo Lorenzoni
- Parents: Rheno Julio Lorenzoni (father); Dalva Dornelles Lorenzoni (mother)
- Education: Federal University of Santa Maria (BA)

Onyx Dornelles Lorenzoni (born 3 October 1954) is a Brazilian politician, businessman, and veterinarian. A member of the Liberal Party (PL), he served as a federal deputy from Rio Grande do Sul for five terms. After the 2018 Brazilian general election, the president-elect Jair Bolsonaro invited Lorenzoni to be his Chief of Staff. He was also designated leader of the transition team.

In 2022, he ran to become Rio Grande do Sul's governor. In the 2022 gubernatorial elections, he came in 1st place with 37.5% of the vote in the 1st round. However, he failed to get elected in the second round, receiving 42.88% of the vote against Eduardo Leite.

== Biography ==
Lorenzoni was elected State Deputy of Rio Grande do Sul in 1994 for the Liberal Party (PL) (merged with Party of the Republic in 2006). In 2003, now in the Liberal Front Party (PFL), he was elected Federal Deputy, being one of the strongest opponents of the government of president Luiz Inácio Lula da Silva and the Workers' Party (PT).

During his terms in the Chamber of Deputies, Lorenzoni was a member of the Mixed Inquiry Parliamentary Committee (CPMI), investigating Correios, Cachoeira (illegal gambling entrepreneur Carlinhos Cachoeira), and Petrobras.

On 2016, Lorenzoni voted for the impeachment of then president Dilma Rousseff (PT). During the government of Michel Temer (MDB), Lorenzoni supported the Constitutional Amendment nº.95 (New Tax Regime) and Labor Reform. On August and September 2017, the Deputy voted against the reports that rejected two complaints made by the then Prosecutor General Rodrigo Janot against president Temer.

On 14 March 2017, Prosecutor General Rodrigo Janot sent to the Supreme Federal Court 83 inquiries based in pleas made by 78 executives of Odebrecht, being mentioned in Odebrecht testimonies. In June 2018, Supreme Court Justice Luiz Fux rejected the inquiry: "The steps taken were not enough to elucidate the materiality of the alleged crime". To the RBS TV, Lorenzoni assumed the irregularity, claiming that he "couldn't" declare the money to the Electoral Justice, and that the cipher would be less than the R$200,000 (Note: US$54,123 as of 3 November 2018.) cited by Ricardo Saud.

Lorenzoni is a member of the Evangelical Lutheran Church of Brazil.

In June 2020 he was diagnosed with COVID-19.

== Positions ==
=== Anti-corruption measures ===
In 2016, Lorenzoni was part of the committee that turned the ten anti-corruption measures proposed by the Federal Public Prosecutor's Office into law. During the process of discussion, four versions of the report were presented.

The first report Lorenzoni presented on 9 November criminalised "caixa 2" and proposed integrity tests for public agents with solely administrative consequences, while the original text had proposed criminal and civil lawsuits.

The second report, presented on 21 November, typified the crime of "caixa 2", with sentences of two to five years for people who use non-declared resources in electoral campaigns. These changes were seen as a way for politicians who used "caixa 2" before the change in law to seek amnesty, although the report had not proposed the amnesty directly. Also, vote selling was typified as crime. This version had 17 measures.

Lorenzoni's third report on 22 November decreased the number of measures from 17 to 12, removing those that mentioned popular lawsuits and international cooperation pleas.

The fourth report, with 20 changes from the previous one, was presented on 23 November. Among the changes there were: raising the minimum amount required for active and passive corruption to be considered a major crime from 100 to 10,000 minimum wage equivalents (about R$8.8 million); removal of the time to set up investigations and finish denounces; prosecuting those who practice it in the name of a candidate (in addition to the candidates themselves, their political parties and donors). The Committee unanimously approved this version the same day, with 30 votes in favour.

=== Prison in second instance ===
In October 2016, Lorenzoni supported the decision of the Supreme Federal Court of allowing the prison of defendants convicted in second instance, and said the will include it among the anti-corruptions measures. "What are we gonna do? We're gonna bring this decision of the Supreme Federal Court and put in the final report. In other words, from now on, there is a decision of the Supreme Court and in a few months there will be, in the Brazilian Code of Penal Procedure, the same decision confirmed in a law by the Brazilian parliament", he said.

=== "Caixa 2" amnesty ===
In November 2016, Lorenzoni opposed "caixa 2" amnesty, along with Deputies Fernando Francischini (SD-PR), Alessandro Molon (REDE-RJ), Vanderlei Macris (PSDB-SP), Carlos Sampaio (PSDB-SP), Joaquim Passarinho (PSD-PA), and Senators Alvaro Dias (PV-PR) and Ana Amélia Lemos (PP-RS), listening to the claims of the civil society that signed for the approval of the 10 Anti-corruption Measures, and of the Public Prosecutor's Office, author of the bill.

=== Legal immunity ===
In November 2016, in an interview in the Brazilian TV show Roda Viva, Deputy Lorenzoni reaffirmed his opposition to legal immunity. "There is, in the country, a feeling of impunity. I hope the Congress take this moment to make a conciliation with the streets. The parliamentaries need to have capacity and humility to listen to the voice of the streets".

== See also ==
- Anti-corruption
- Chamber of Deputies
- Corruption in Brazil

== Notes ==
Political offices
Preceded by Eliseu Padilha	Chief of Staff of the Presidency; 2019–2020	Succeeded by Walter Souza Braga Netto
Preceded by Osmar Terra	Minister of Citizenship; 2020–21	Succeeded by João Roma
Vacant Title last held by Jorge Oliveira	Secretary-General of the Presidency; 2021	Succeeded by Luiz Eduardo Ramos
Position reestablished	Minister of Labour and Social Security; 2021–2022	Succeeded by José Carlos Oliveira
