= Jorge Oliveira =

Brazilian lawyer and retired military police officer

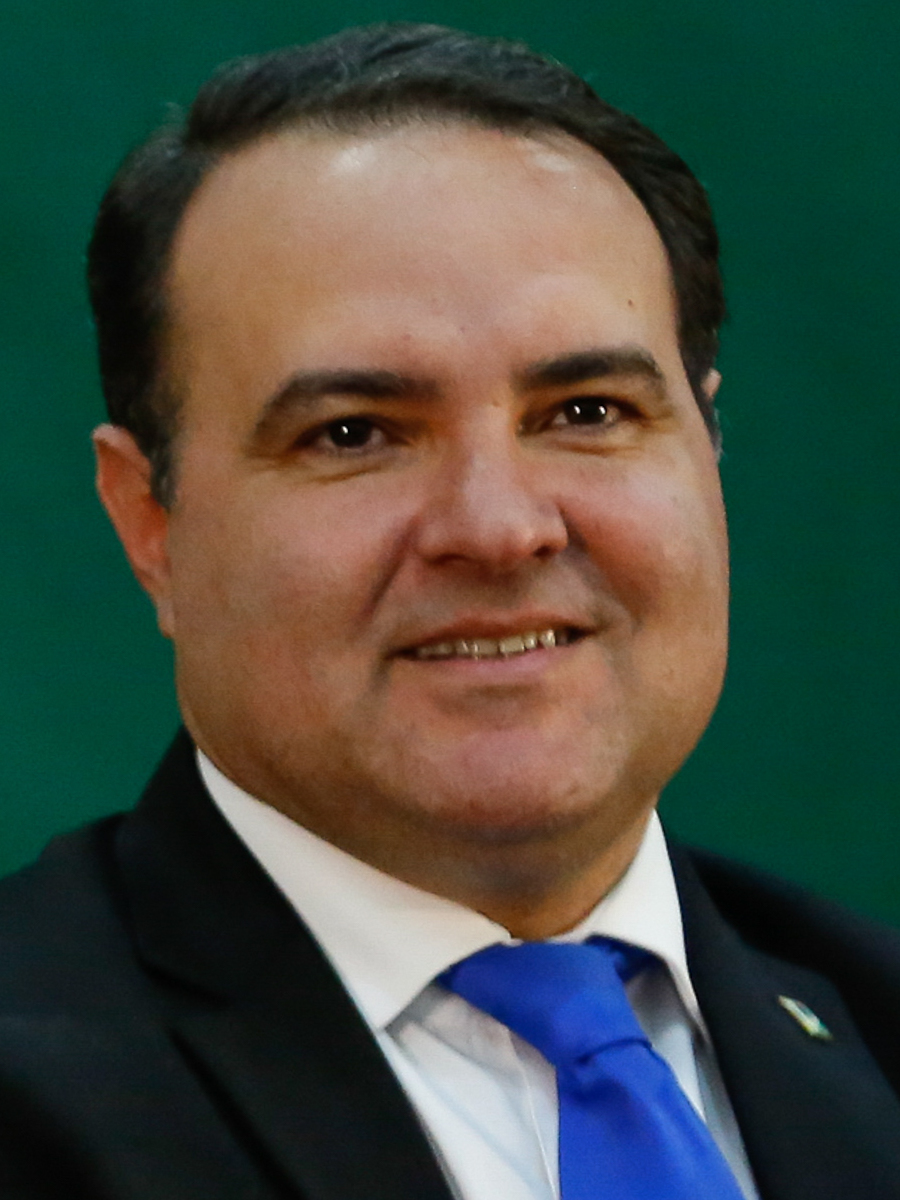

Minister of the Federal Court of Accounts
- Incumbent
- Assumed office 31 December 2020
- Nominated by: Jair Bolsonaro
- Preceded by: José Múcio

General Secretary of the Presidency
- In office 21 June 2019 – 31 December 2020
- President: Jair Bolsonaro
- Preceded by: Floriano Peixoto Vieira Neto
- Succeeded by: Pedro Cesar Sousa (interim)

Personal details
- Born: Jorge Antônio de Oliveira Francisco; 15 November 1974 (age 51) Rio de Janeiro, Brazil

Military service
- Allegiance: Brazil
- Branch/service: Military Police of the Federal District
- Rank: Major

Jorge Antônio de Oliveira Francisco is a Brazilian lawyer and retired military police officer, minister of the Federal Court of Accounts. Formerly, he was Secretary-General of the Presidency of the Republic.

== Biography ==
Oliveira graduated in high school in the Brasília Military School and reached the rank of Major in the Military Police of the Federal District. He retired and military police in 2013. Bachelor in Law, Oliveira coursed Knowledge and Operations Production in the Brazilian Intelligence Agency (Abin) and worked from 2003 to 2018 in the National Congress.

On 21 June 2019, President Jair Bolsonaro nominated him as Secretary-General of the Presidency of the Republic, replacing retired Divisional General Floriano Peixoto Vieira Neto, who was transferred to the presidency of the Brazilian Company of Post Offices and Telegraphs.

On 20 October 2020, Jorge Oliveira was confirmed by the Federal Senate to the Federal Court of Accounts, succeeding minister José Múcio, who retired on 31 December.

Political offices
Preceded by Floriano Peixoto Vieira Neto	Secretary-General of the Presidency; 2019–20	Vacant Title next held by Onyx Lorenzoni
Preceded by José Múcio	Minister of the Federal Court of Accounts; 2020–present	Incumbent
