= Célio Faria Júnior =

Brazilian politician

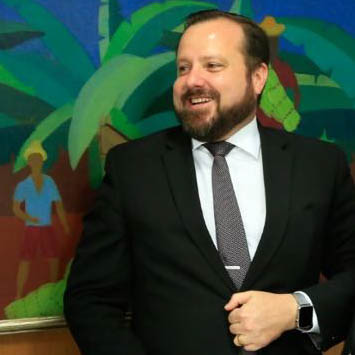
- Faria in 2022

Secretary of Government
- In office 31 March 2022 – 31 December 2022
- President: Jair Bolsonaro
- Preceded by: Flávia Arruda
- Succeeded by: Office abolished

Personal details
- Party: Independent

Célio Faria Júnior is a Brazilian politician. From March to December 2022, he served as secretary of government. From 2022 to 2023, he was a member of the Public Ethics Commission.
