= Pedro II, Piauí =

Coordinates: 4°25′S 41°28′W

- Municipality
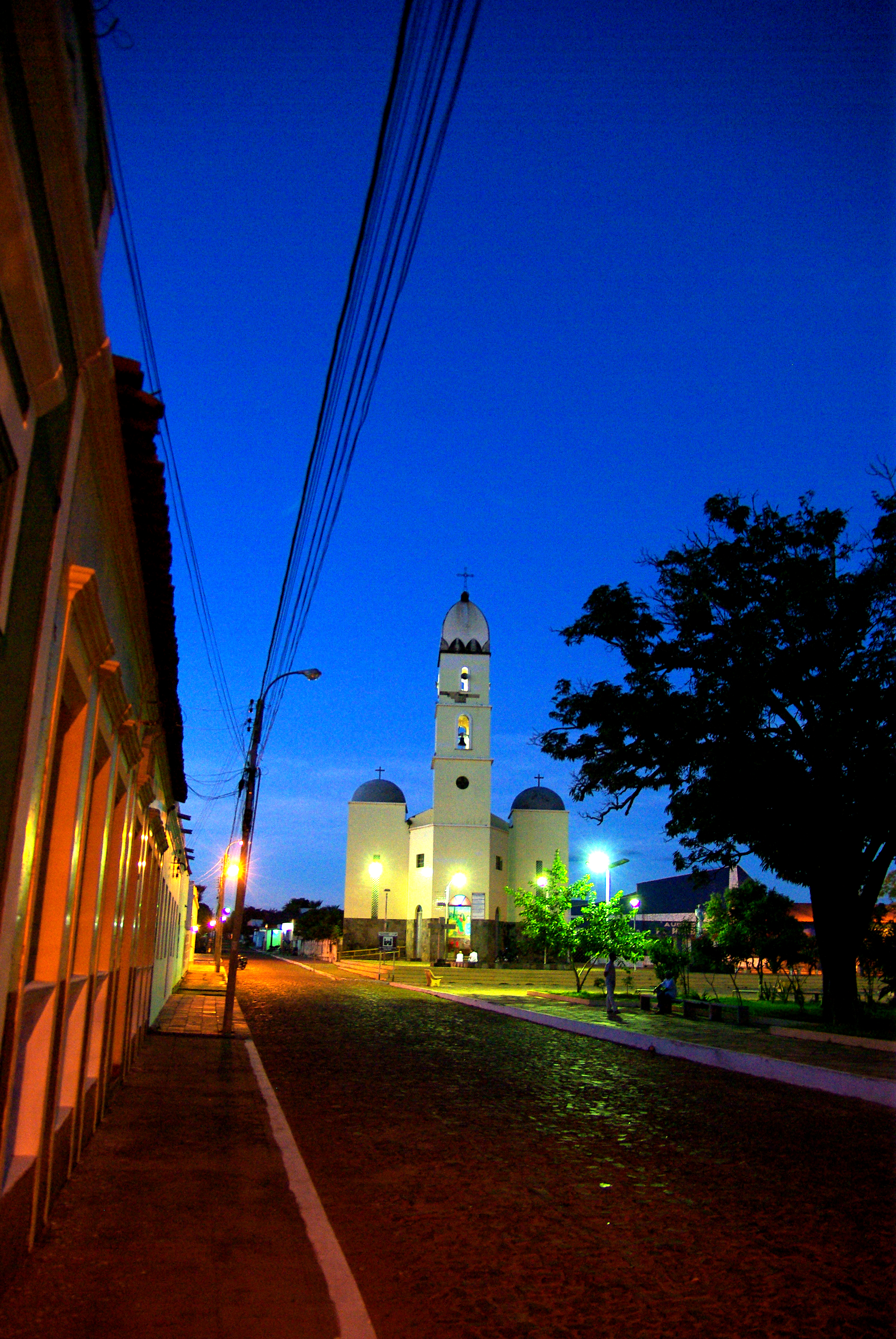

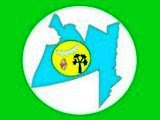
- Flag

- Country: Brazil
- Region: Nordeste
- State: Piauí
- Mesoregion: Centro-Norte Piauiense

Population (2020)
  - Total: 38,778
- Time zone: UTC−3 (BRT)

Pedro II, Piauí is a municipality in the state of Piauí in the Northeast region of Brazil.

Pedro II, or Pedro Segundo, named after Brazil's last Emperor. The city has the only mined opal deposit in South America. A mine in Peru closed a few years ago. Opals were discovered here in 1930 by a man who was washing a cassava for his lunch. The strange stone was sent to Teresina where it was identified as an opal.

The municipality contains part of the 1,592,550 hectares (3,935,300 acres) Serra da Ibiapaba Environmental Protection Area, created in 1996.

== See also ==
- List of municipalities in Piauí
