= Floriano Peixoto Vieira Neto =

Floriano Peixoto
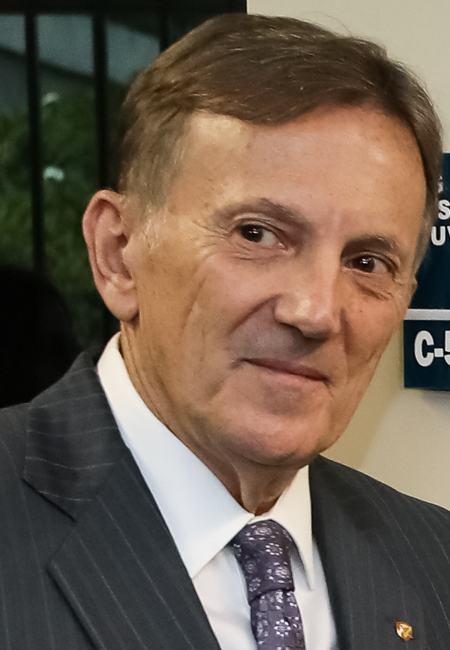

President of Correios
- In office 20 June 2019 – 7 August 2023
- President: Jair Bolsonaro
- Preceded by: Juarez Cunha
- Succeeded by: Fabiano Silva dos Santos

General Secretary of the Presidency
- In office 18 February 2019 – 20 June 2019
- President: Jair Bolsonaro
- Preceded by: Gustavo Bebianno
- Succeeded by: Jorge Oliveira

Commander of MINUSTAH
- In office April 2009 – March 2010
- Head: Hédi Annabi; Edmond Mulet
- Preceded by: Carlos Alberto dos Santos Cruz
- Succeeded by: Luiz Guilherme Paul Cruz

Personal details
- Born: Floriano Peixoto Vieira Neto; 22 May 1954 (age 72) Tombos, Minas Gerais, Brazil

Military service
- Allegiance: Brazil
- Branch/service: Brazilian Army
- Rank: Divisional General
- Commands: MINUSTAH; 12th Light Infantry Brigadier; 2nd Army Division
- Awards: United Nations Medal (MINUSTAH - Haiti)

Floriano Peixoto Vieira Neto (born 22 May 1954) is a retired Divisional General of the Brazilian Army and former commander of the United Nations Stabilization Mission in Haiti (MINUSTAH). Born in Minas Gerais, he is a graduate of the Agulhas Negras Military Academy and has served as commander of three different army battalions and also as liaison officer of the Brazilian Army and instructor at the United States Military Academy at West Point, New York. From April 2009 to April 2010, Div. Gen. Floriano Peixoto was the commander of MINUSTAH, under mandate of the United Nations Security Council.

He assumed the position of Chief Minister of the General Secretariat of the Presidency of the Republic of Brazil, replacing Gustavo Bebianno. Later, he was transferred to the Brazilian Company of Post Offices and Telegraphs (Correios), replacing General Juarez Cunha, and was replaced in the Secretariat-General by the Sub-Chief of Legal Affairs for the Chief of Staff, Jorge de Oliveira Francisco.

== Awards ==
- United Nations Medal (MINUSTAH - Haiti)

Diplomatic posts
Preceded by Carlos Alberto dos Santos Cruz	Commander of MINUSTAH; 2009–2010	Succeeded by Luiz Guilherme Paul Cruz
Political offices
Preceded by Gustavo Bebianno	Secretary-General of the Presidency; 2019	Succeeded by Jorge Oliveira
Government offices
Preceded by Juarez Cunha	President of Correios; 2019–2023	Succeeded by Fabiano Silva dos Santos
