= Secretary of Government =

2005–2023 cabinet minister in Brazil

Secretariat of Government
- Portuguese: Secretaria de Governo

Ministry overview
- Formed: 21 July 2005
- Dissolved: 1 January 2023; 3 years ago
- Jurisdiction: Federal government of Brazil
- Headquarters: Planalto Palace, Praça dos Três Poderes; Brasília, Federal District
- Website: www.gov.br/secretariadegoverno/

The Secretary of Government of Brazil (Portuguese: Secretaria de Governo do Brasil) was a cabinet-level federal minister in Brazil. The last Secretary of Government was Célio Faria Júnior.

== List of secretaries ==
No.	Portrait	Secretary	Took office	Left office	Time in office	Party	President
1	Ricardo Berzoini	Ricardo Berzoini (born 1960)	2 October 2015	12 May 2016	223 days	PT	Dilma Rousseff (PT)
2	Geddel Vieira Lima	Geddel Vieira Lima (born 1959)	12 May 2016	25 November 2016	197 days	MDB	Michel Temer (MDB)
3	Antônio Imbassahy	Antônio Imbassahy (born 1948)	3 February 2017	15 December 2017	315 days	PSDB	Michel Temer (MDB)
4	Carlos Marun	Carlos Marun (born 1960)	15 December 2017	1 January 2019	1 year, 17 days	MDB	Michel Temer (MDB)
5	Santos Cruz	Santos Cruz (born 1952)	1 January 2019	13 June 2019	163 days	Independent	Jair Bolsonaro (PSL)
6	Luiz Eduardo Ramos	Luiz Eduardo Ramos (born 1956)	13 June 2019	29 March 2021	1 year, 289 days	Independent	Jair Bolsonaro (Ind)
7	Flávia Arruda	Flávia Arruda (born 1980)	30 March 2021	31 March 2022	1 year, 1 day	PL	Jair Bolsonaro (PL)
8	Célio Faria Júnior	Célio Faria Júnior	31 March 2022	1 January 2023	276 days	Independent	Jair Bolsonaro (PL)
