= Santos Cruz =

Brazilian general and politician

General Carlos Alberto dos Santos Cruz
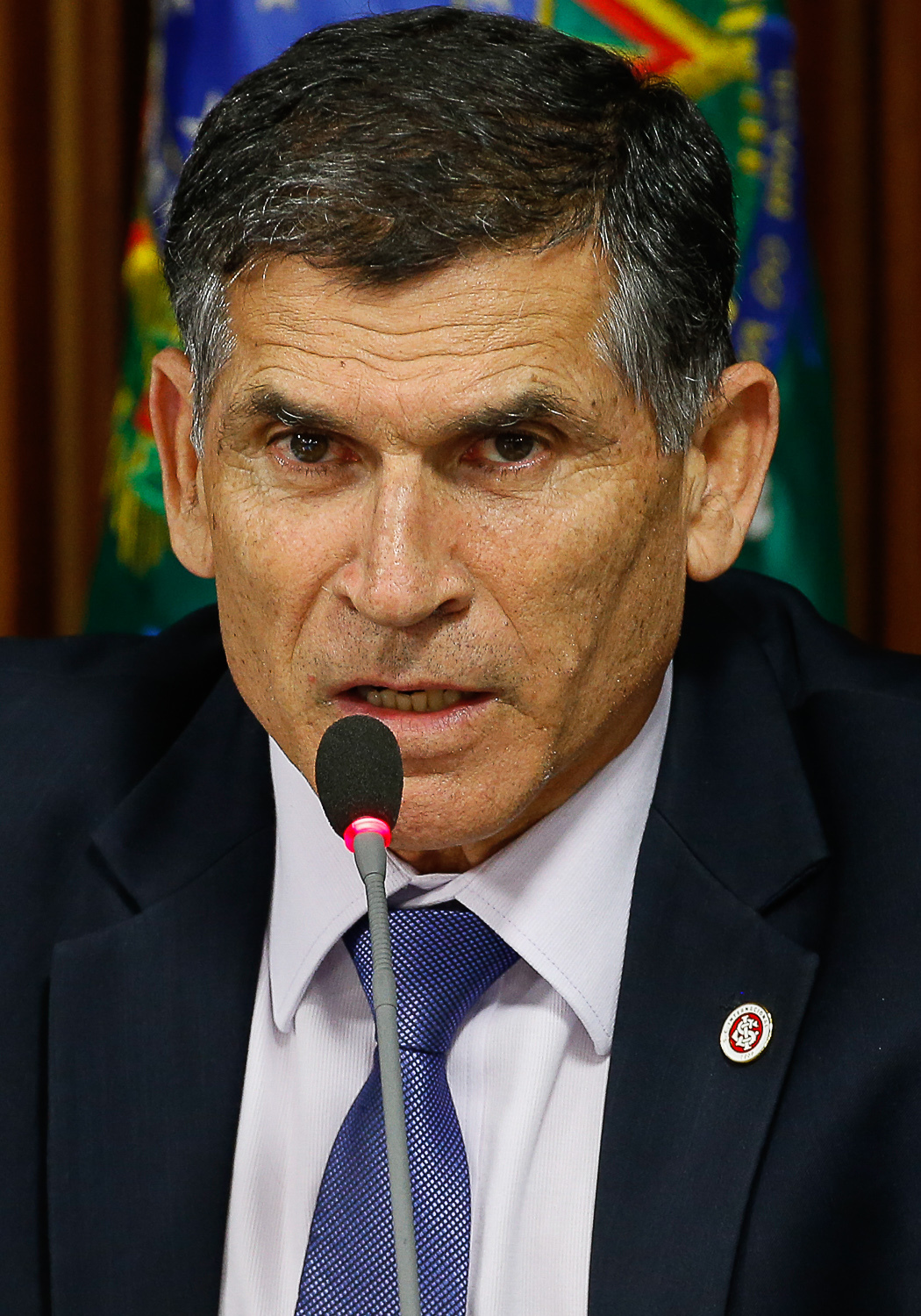

Minister-Secretary of Government of Brazil
- In office 1 January 2019 – 13 June 2019
- President: Jair Bolsonaro
- Preceded by: Carlos Marun
- Succeeded by: Luiz Eduardo Ramos

Force Commander of MONUSCO
- In office April 2013 – December 2015
- Head: Martin Kobler
- Preceded by: Chander Prakash
- Succeeded by: Derrick Mgwebi

Force Commander of MINUSTAH
- In office January 2007 – April 2009
- Head: Edmond Mulet; Hédi Annabi
- Preceded by: José Elito Carvalho Siqueira
- Succeeded by: Floriano Peixoto Vieira Neto

Personal details
- Born: Carlos Alberto dos Santos Cruz; 1 June 1952 (age 73) Rio Grande, Rio Grande do Sul, Brazil
- Party: PODE (2021–present)
- Spouse: Dora Regina Gondim

Military service
- Allegiance: Brazil; United Nations
- Branch/service: Brazilian Army
- Years of service: 1968–2019
- Rank: Divisional General
- Commands: MINUSTAH; MONUSCO; 43rd Motorized Infantry Battalion; 13th Motorized Infantry Brigade; 2nd Army Division; National Public Security Force
- Awards: Order of Military Merit Order of Naval Merit Order of Aeronautical Merit Order of Labor Merit of Getúlio Vargas Peacemaker Medal Military Medal Order of Defence Merit United Nations Medal

Divisional general Carlos Alberto dos Santos Cruz (born 1 June 1952) is a Brazilian military officer who previously held the post of Force Commander of the United Nations' peacekeeping force in the Democratic Republic of the Congo (known by its acronym, MONUSCO). He was appointed to this position by United Nations Secretary-General Ban Ki-moon on 17 May 2013 and replaced by Derrick Mbuyiselo Mgwebi on 29 December 2015. He was Minister-Secretary of Government of Brazil, nominated by President Jair Bolsonaro, from 1 January 2019 to 13 June 2019.

== Biography ==
His grandfather emigrated from Vila Nova de Cerveira, Portugal in 1921 at the age of 22. He is of Quadroon stock on his grandmother's side. His mother is of Portuguese Nobility origin from Bahia. A graduate of the Military Academy of Agulhas Negras 1974 Promotion (Resende, Rio de Janeiro) and the Catholic University of Campinas, Santos Cruz has more than 40 years of national and international military experience. He served as Deputy Commander for Land Operations of the Brazilian Army from April 2011 and March 2013. He also served as Special Adviser to the Minister for the Secretariat of Strategic Affairs within the Presidency of Brazil.

Santos Cruz served as Force Commander of the United Nations Stabilization Mission in Haiti (MINUSTAH) between January 2007 and April 2009. In April 2013, he received command of United Nations Organization Stabilization Mission in the Democratic Republic of the Congo (MONUSCO). Santos Cruz commanded MONUSCO during the M23 rebellion and was praised for providing "strong backing" to the UN forces engaged alongside Congolese government forces.

In August 2022, Santos Cruz was appointed by United Nations Secretary-General António Guterres to lead the United Nations fact-finding mission regarding the Olenivka prison massacre, together with Ingibjörg Sólrún Gísladóttir and Issoufou Yacouba.

== Awards and decorations ==
General da Cruz has been awarded:

- Order of Military Merit (Grand Officer - Grande-Oficial) (Brazil)
- Order of Naval Merit (Commander) (Note: Portuguese: Ordem do Mérito Naval- Comendador) (Brazil)
- Order of Aeronautical Merit (Grand Officer) (Note: Portuguese: Ordem do Mérito Aeronáutico - Grande-Oficial) (Brazil)
- Order of Labor Merit of Getúlio Vargas (Class III: Commander) (Note: Portuguese: Ordem do Mérito do Trabalho Getúlio Vargas – Comendador) (Brazil)
- Peacemaker Medal (Note: Portuguese: Medalha do Pacificador) (Brazil)
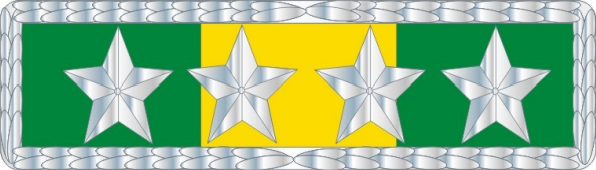
- Military Medal (4 Stars: Gold - 40 Years) (Note: Portuguese: Medalha Militar – Medalha de Ouro com Passador de Platina) (Brazil)
- Order of Defence Merit (Grand Officer) (Note: Portuguese: Ordem do Mérito da Defesa - Grande-Oficial) (Brazil)
- United Nations Medal (MINUSTAH - Haiti) (United Nations)
- United Nations Medal (MONUSCO - DRC (Numeral 4)) (United Nations)
- 18 May 1811 Medal

== Notes ==
Diplomatic posts
Preceded by José Elito Carvalho Siqueira	Force Commander of MINUSTAH; 2007–2009	Succeeded by Floriano Peixoto Vieira Neto
Preceded by Chander Prakash	Force Commander of MONUSCO; 2013–2015	Succeeded by Derrick Mbuyiselo Mgwebi
Political offices
Preceded by Carlos Marun	Secretary of Government of Brazil; 2019	Succeeded by Luiz Eduardo Ramos
