= Flávia Arruda =

Brazilian politician

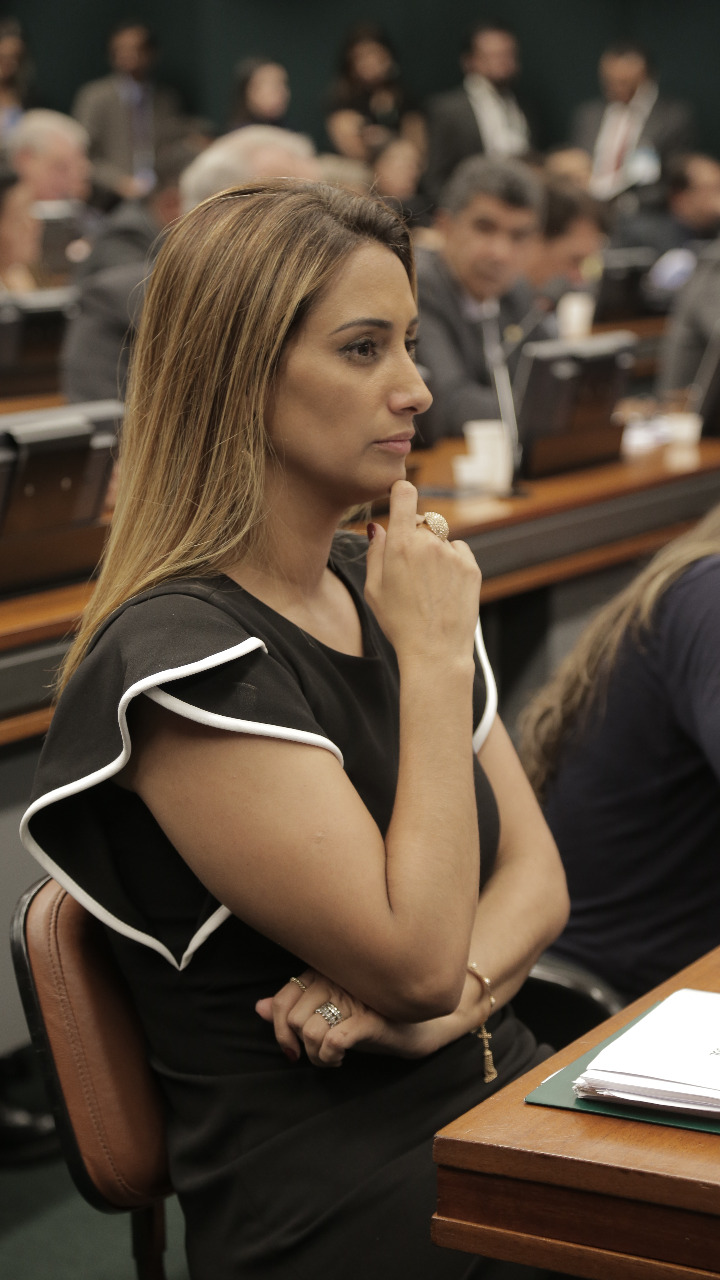

Secretary of Government
- In office 29 March 2021 – 31 March 2022
- President: Jair Bolsonaro
- Preceded by: Luiz Eduardo Ramos
- Succeeded by: Célio Faria Júnior

Member of the Chamber of Deputies
- In office 1 February 2019 – 1 February 2023
- Constituency: Federal District

First Lady of the Federal District
- In role 1 January 2007 – 16 March 2010
- Governor: José Roberto Arruda
- Preceded by: Weslian Roriz
- Succeeded by: Anna Christina Kubitschek

Personal details
- Born: Flávia Carolina Peres; 21 January 1980 (age 46) Taguatinga, Federal District, Brazil
- Party: PL (2013–2023)
- Other political affiliations: DEM (2009–13)
- Spouse: José Roberto Arruda (m. 2007; div. 2023)
- Children: 2
- Education: Euroamerican University Center (LL.B.)

Flávia Carolina Peres (born 21 January 1980), commonly known as Flávia Arruda, is a Brazilian entrepreneur, lawyer and politician, member of the Liberal Party. She was the Secretary of Government of Brazil under Jair Bolsonaro from 29th of March 2021 to the 31st of March 2022 and a federal deputy from 2019-2023.

== Biography ==
Arruda began her bachelor's degree in Physical Education in the Catholic University of Brasília but didn't conclude it. Flávia worked in Taguatinga for a while, until she decided to open a school in Recanto das Emas. Married to former Governor of the Federal District, José Roberto Arruda, Flávia is mother of two daughters.

After an invitation made by Rede Bandeirantes, she was presenter of the show "Nossa Gente", which showed social projects. A few years later, she moved to São Paulo, where she was a weather presenter in a national TV news program.

In 2019, Arruda concluded her bachelor's degree in Laws at the Euroamerican University Center. In 2021, she was elect Chair of the Planning, Public Budget and Oversight Mixed Committee of the National Congress.

Honorary titles
Vacant Title last held by Weslian Roriz	First Lady of the Federal District; 2007–10	Succeeded by Anna Christina Kubitschek
Political offices
Preceded by Luiz Eduardo Ramos	Secretary of Government; 2021–2022	Succeeded by Célio Faria Júnior
