= Antônio Imbassahy =

Brazilian politician and electrical engineer

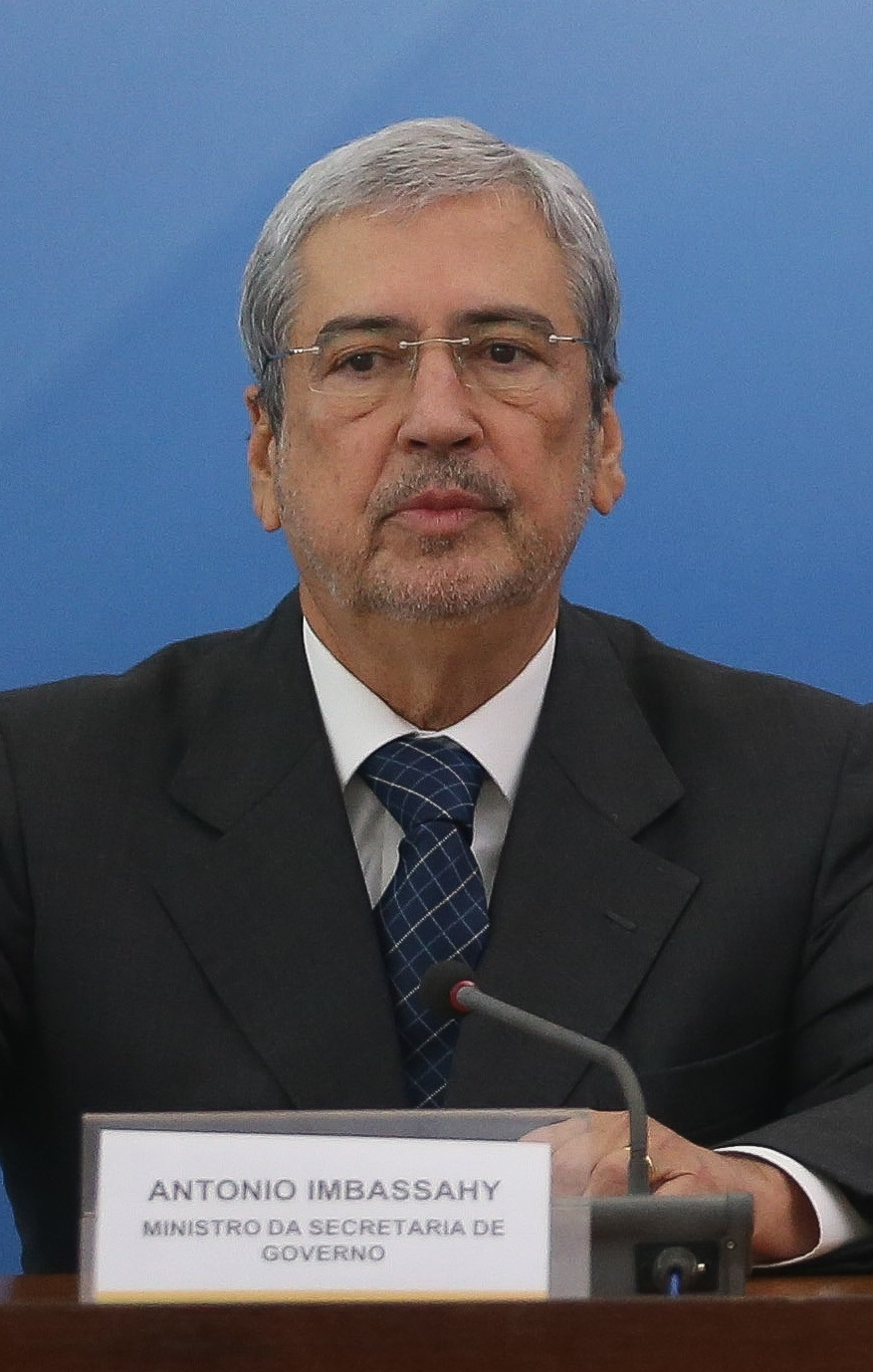

Federal Deputy
- In office 1 February 2011 – 1 February 2019
- Constituency: Bahia

Secretary of Government
- In office 3 February 2017 – 15 December 2017
- President: Michel Temer
- Preceded by: Geddel Vieira Lima
- Succeeded by: Carlos Marun

Mayor of Salvador
- In office 1 January 1997 – 1 January 2005
- Preceded by: Lídice da Mata
- Succeeded by: João Henrique Carneiro

Governor of Bahia
- In office 2 May 1994 – 1 January 1995
- Vice Governor: Vacant
- Preceded by: Ruy Trindade
- Succeeded by: Paulo Souto

State Deputy of Bahia
- In office 1 January 1995 – 1 February 1995
- Constituency: At-large
- In office 1 February 1991 – 2 May 1994
- Constituency: At-large

Personal details
- Born: Antônio José Imbassahy da Silva; 12 March 1948 (age 78) Salvador, BA, Brazil
- Party: PSDB (2005–present)
- Other political affiliations: PFL (1985–2004)
- Spouse: Márcia Imbassahy
- Education: Federal University of Bahia (UFBA)
- Occupation: Electrical engineer

Antônio José Imbassahy da Silva, or simply Antônio Imbassahy, (born 12 March 1948) is a Brazilian politician and electrical engineer, former governor of Bahia and former mayor of Salvador.

Elected federal deputy by the Brazilian Social Democracy Party (PSDB), da Silva was chosen leader of the party in the Chamber of Deputies in December 2015 and took office on 2 February 2016. Also, in December of the same year, Imbassahy was chosen to be Secretary of Government, replacing Geddel Vieira Lima. Resigned on 8 December 2017, one day before the national convention of the PSDB, which officialized its departure from the government.

== See also ==
- List of mayors of Salvador, Bahia

Political offices
Preceded by Ruy Trindade	Governor of Bahia; 1994–1995	Succeeded by Paulo Souto
Preceded by Lídice da Mata	Mayor of Salvador; 1997–2005	Succeeded by João Henrique Carneiro
Preceded by Geddel Vieira Lima	Secretary of Government; 2017	Succeeded by Carlos Marun
