= Ronaldo Bento =

Brazilian politician (born 1977)

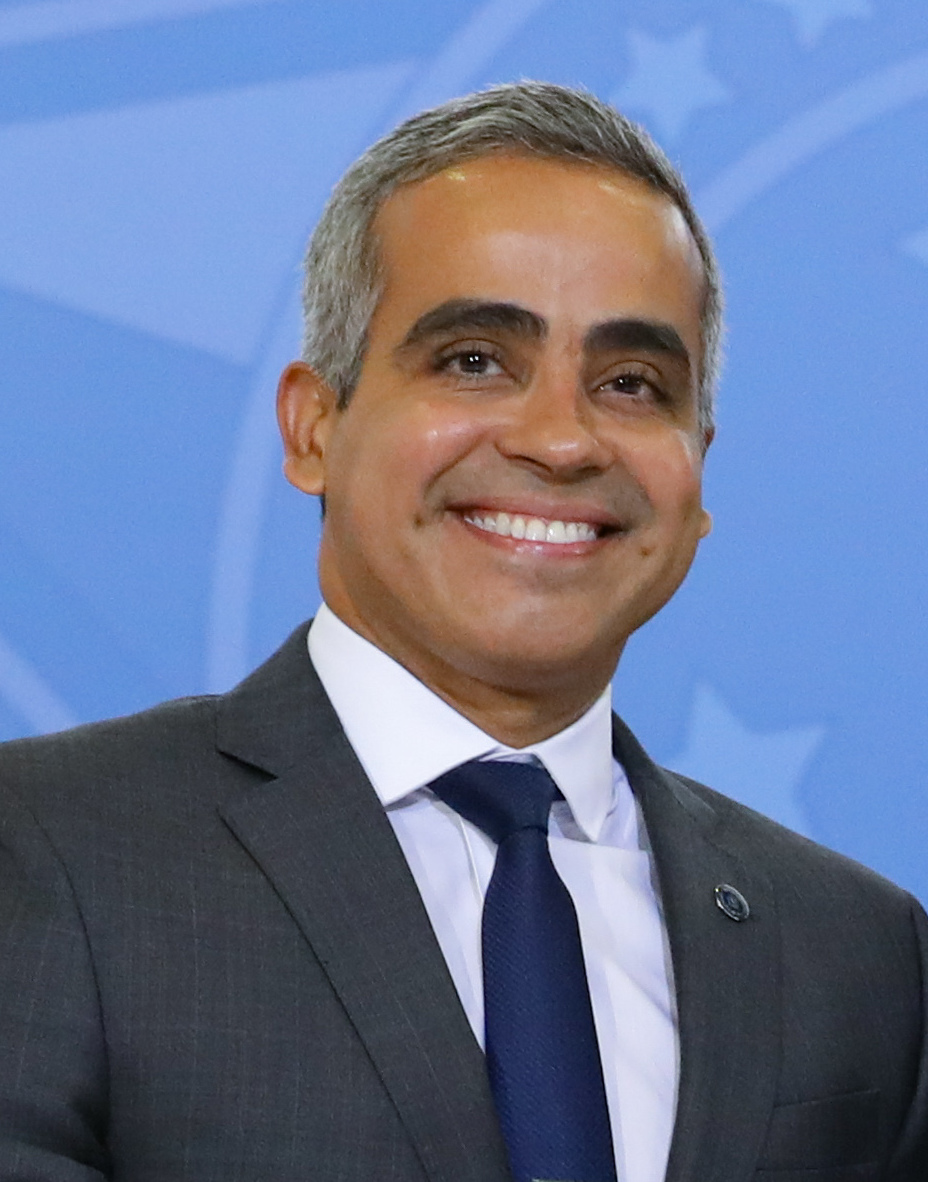
- Bento in 2022

Minister of Citizenship
- In office 31 March 2022 – 31 December 2022
- President: Jair Bolsonaro
- Preceded by: João Roma
- Succeeded by: Silvio Almeida (as minister of human rights and citizenship); Ana Moser (as minister of sports)

Personal details
- Born: 1977 (age 48–49) Salvador, (BA)
- Party: Republicans (since 2023)

Ronaldo Vieira Bento (born 1977) is a Brazilian politician. From March to December 2022, he served as minister of citizenship. He has been a member of the Republicans since 2023.

== Professional life ==
He became director of the Banco Plano in 2025, that had been liquidated since.

== Personal life ==
Ronaldo Vieira Bento is from Salvador (BA), married and father of three children. Master in Law, he is a federal police officer and 1st lieutenant in the unpaid reserve of the Brazilian Army. A career public servant of the Federal Executive since 2005, he served as coordinator of the State Port Public Security Council and as a full member of the Federal Government's Public Transparency and Combating Corruption Council.

Political offices
Preceded by João Roma	Minister of Citizenship; 2022	Succeeded by Silvio Almeida
