= Ministry of Citizenship (Brazil) =

Ministry overview
- Formed: 1 January 2019
- Dissolved: 1 January 2023
- Jurisdiction: Federal government of Brazil
- Headquarters: Brasília, Distrito Federal
- Annual budget: R$ 97,09 billion (2020)
- Minister responsible: Ronaldo Vieira Bento
- Website: www.gov.br/cidadania

The Ministry of Citizenship (Portuguese: Ministério da Cidadania), created by the fusion of the Ministry of Social and Agrarian Development (Portuguese: Ministério do Desenvolvimento Social e Agrário), Ministry of Culture and Ministry of Sports, was a cabinet-level federal ministry in Brazil. The last Minister of citizenship was Ronaldo Bento.
