= 2024 Salvador mayoral election =

2024 Salvador municipal election
- 6 October 2024 (first round)
- Mayoral election
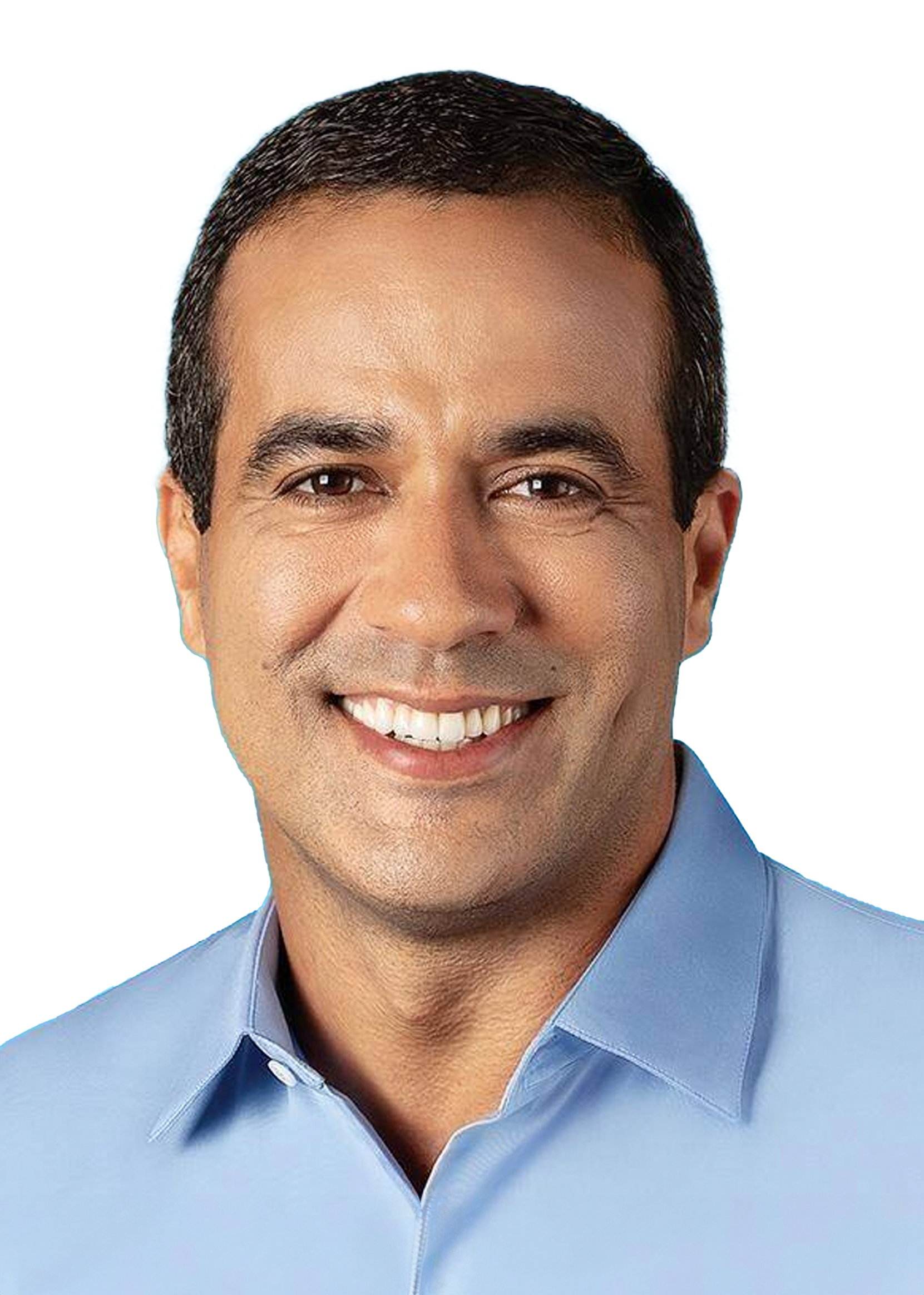

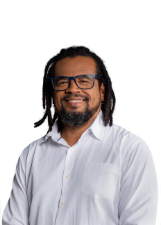

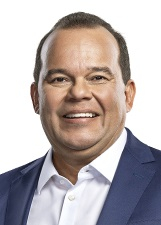
Candidate	Bruno Reis	Kleber Rosa	Geraldo Júnior
Party	UNIÃO	PSOL	MDB
Alliance	The Work Doesn't Stop	No coalition	Salvador for All Everyone
Running mate	Ana Paula Matos	Miralva Nascimento	Fabya Reis
Popular vote	1.045.690	138.610	137.298
Percentage	78,67%	10,43%	10,33%
Mayor before election
Bruno Reis
UNIÃO
Elected mayor
Bruno Reis
UNIÃO
- Parliamentary election
Party	Leader	Vote %	Seats	+/–
Municipal Chamber
UNIÃO	Paulo Magalhaes Jr		7	−1
PSDB-Cidadania	Carlos Muniz		6	+2
PP	Jorge Araújo Repórter		5	+5
Republicanos	Luiz Carlos		4	+1
PDT	Omarzinho		4	+2
FE Brasil	André Fraga		4	−3
PRD	Kênio Rezende		2	−3
PODE	João Cláudio Bacelar		2	−1
PL	Alexandre Aleluia		2	0
DC	Ricardo Almeida		2	+1
PSOL-REDE	Eliete Paraguassu		2	+1
PSB	Silvio Humberto		1	0
PSD	Felipe Santana		1	0
MDB	Dr. David Rios		1	−1
This lists parties that won seats. See the complete results below.

The 2024 Salvador municipal election took place in the city of Salvador, Brazil on 6 October 2024. Voters will elect a mayor, vice mayor, and 43 councillors. The incumbent mayor, Bruno Reis, of the Brazil Union (UNIÃO), is able to run for a second term.

If the most voted candidate on the first round doesn't achieve more than 50% of the votes, a second round will happen on 27 October 2024. The mayor's term will begin on 1 January 2025 and end on 31 December 2028.

== Background ==
=== 2020 election ===
The last mayoral election in Rio de Janeiro, held in 2020, resulted in a largest victory of Bruno Reis (DEM) in the first round. Reis obtained 779.408 votes or 64.20% of the valid votes against his main opponent. He had been vice mayor of the municipality under popular incumbent ACM Neto. His election was viewed as a continued endorsement of ACM Neto's mayorship.

Reis later supported ACM Neto's unsuccessful bid for governor in 2022.

== Electoral calendar ==
Electoral calendar announced by the Superior Electoral Court (TSE) on 3 January 2024
7 March – 5 April	Period of the 'party window' for councillors. During this period, the councillors are able to move to other political parties in order to run for election while not losing their respective political terms.
6 April	Deadline for all parties and party federations to obtain the registration of their statutes at the Superior Electoral Court and for all candidates to have their electoral domicile in the constituency in which they wish to contest the elections with the affiliation granted by the party.
15 May	Start of the preliminary fundraising campaign in the form of collective financing for potential candidates. During this period, candidates are not allowed to ask for votes and are still subjected to obey the rules regarding electoral propaganda on the Internet.
20 July – 5 August	On this date, party conventions begin to deliberate on coalitions and choose candidates for mayors and councillors tickets. Parties have until 15 August to register their names with the Brazilian Election Justice.
16 August	Beginning of electoral campaigns on an equal basis, with any advertising or demonstration explicitly requesting for votes before the date being considered irregular and subject to fines.
30 August – 3 October	Broadcasting of free electoral propaganda on radio and television.
6 October	Date of mayoral elections.
27 October	Date of a possible second round in cities with more than 200,000 voters in which the most voted candidate for mayor has not reached 50% of the valid votes.

== Candidates ==
=== Presumptive candidates ===
Party	Mayoral candidate	Running mate		Coalition
Brazilian Democratic Movement (MDB 15)	Geraldo Júnior: Vice Governor of Bahia (2023–present); Councillor of Salvador (2013–2023)	Workers' Party (PT)	Fabya Reis: Secretary of Social Welfare and Development of Bahia (2023–2024)	Salvador for All Everyone: Brazilian Democratic Movement (MDB); Brazil of Hope (PT, PCdoB, PV); Brazilian Socialist Party (PSB); Social Democratic Party (PSD); Avante; Podemos (PODE); Act (AGIR); Solidarity
Brazilian Communist Party (PCB 21)	Giovani Damico: Teacher of Geography and Master in Social Sciences from the Federal University of Bahia (UFBA)	Brazilian Communist Party (PCB)	Cheyenne Ayalla: Student and activist of the Brazilian Communist Party	Brazilian Communist Party (PCB)
Brazil Union (UNIÃO 44)	Bruno Reis: Mayor of Salvador (2021–present); Vice Mayor of Salvador (2017–2021); State Deputy of Bahia (2011–2016)	Democratic Labour Party (PDT)	Ana Paula Matos: Vice Mayor of Salvador (2021–present)	The Work Doesn't Stop: Brazil Union (UNIÃO); Democratic Labour Party (PDT); Democratic Renewal Party (PRD); Republicans; Always Forward (PSDB, Cidadania); Progressistas (PP); Christian Democracy (DC); Liberal Party (PL); New Party (NOVO); Brazilian Woman's Party (PMB); Brazilian Labour Renewal Party (PRTB); National Mobilization (MOBILIZA)
Socialism and Liberty Party (PSOL 50)	Kleber Rosa: Social scientist, black movement activist, general coordinator of the Federation of Public Workers of the State of Bahia (FETRAB)	Socialism and Liberty Party (PSOL)	Miralva Nascimento: Popular educator and executive coordinator of the Bahia Homeless Movement (BHM)	PSOL REDE Federation (PSOL and REDE)
Popular Unity (UP 80)	Eslane Paixão: Activist and state president of Popular Unity in Bahia	Popular Unity (UP)	Giovana Ferreira: National Coordinator of the Women's Movement Olga Benário	Popular Unity (UP)

=== Potential candidates ===
United Socialist Workers' Party (PSTU)

- Victor Marinho – Researcher at the Laboratory of Marxist Studies and Research (LEMARX — FACED/UFBA).

=== Withdrawn candidates ===
Brazilian Socialist Party (PSB)

- Zé Trindade – President of the Bahia State Urban Development Company (Conder) (2021–present) and councillor of Salvador (2013–2020). He left the race as a potential candidate on 1 September 2023 due to personal and health reasons.
- Lídice da Mata – Member of the Chamber of Deputies from Bahia (1987–1991; 2007–2011; 2019–present); Senator for Bahia (2011–2019); Member of the Legislative Assembly of Bahia (1999–2007); Mayor of Salvador (1993–1997) and councillor of Salvador (1983–1987). On 1 March 2024, she announced that running for mayor in the 2024 local elections of Brazil wasn't in her plans and she was focused on other tasks as a politician. She was announced as the coordinator of Geraldo Júnior's campaign on the end of April 2024.

New Party (NOVO)

- Luciana Buck – University professor and company administrator. Her own party decided to support Reis' reelection bid and she decided to run for a seat at the Municipal Chamber of Salvador.

Communist Party of Brazil (PCdoB)

- Olívia Santana – Member of the Legislative Assembly of Bahia (2019–present); Secretary of Labor, Employment, Income and Sports of Bahia (2017–2018); Secretary of Policies for Women of Bahia (2015–2017) and Councillor of Salvador (2005–2012). The Brazil of Hope Federation, which the Communist Party of Brazil is a part of, decided to support Junior's candidacy for mayor and nominated Fabya Reis as his running mate.
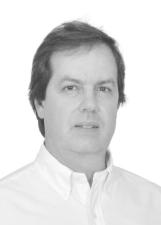
Councillor
Zé Trindade (PSB)
from Salvador

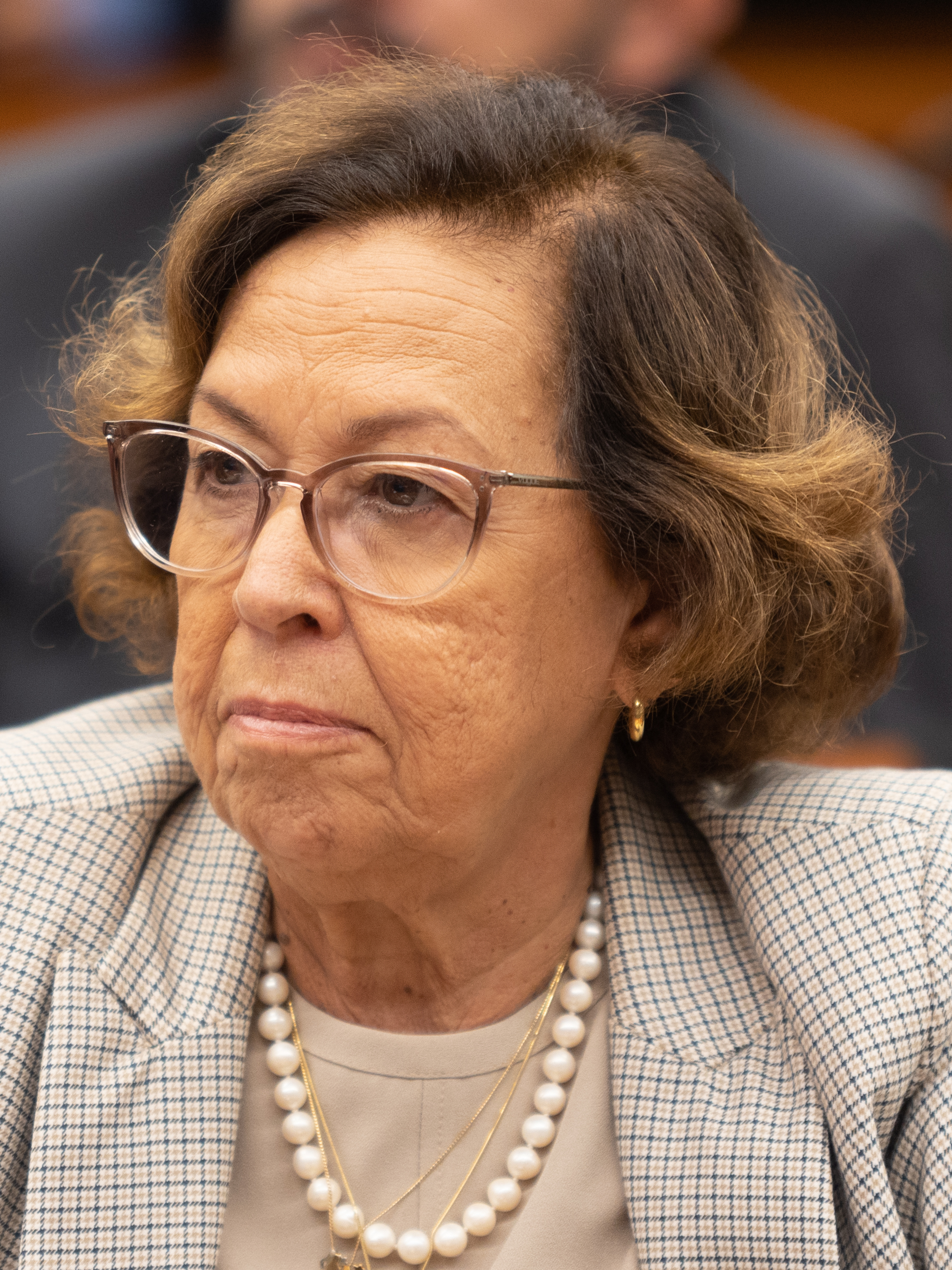
Federal Deputy
Lídice da Mata (PSB)
from Cachoeira

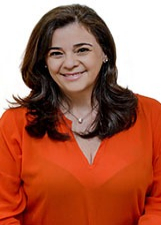
University professor
Luciana Buck (NOVO)
from Salvador

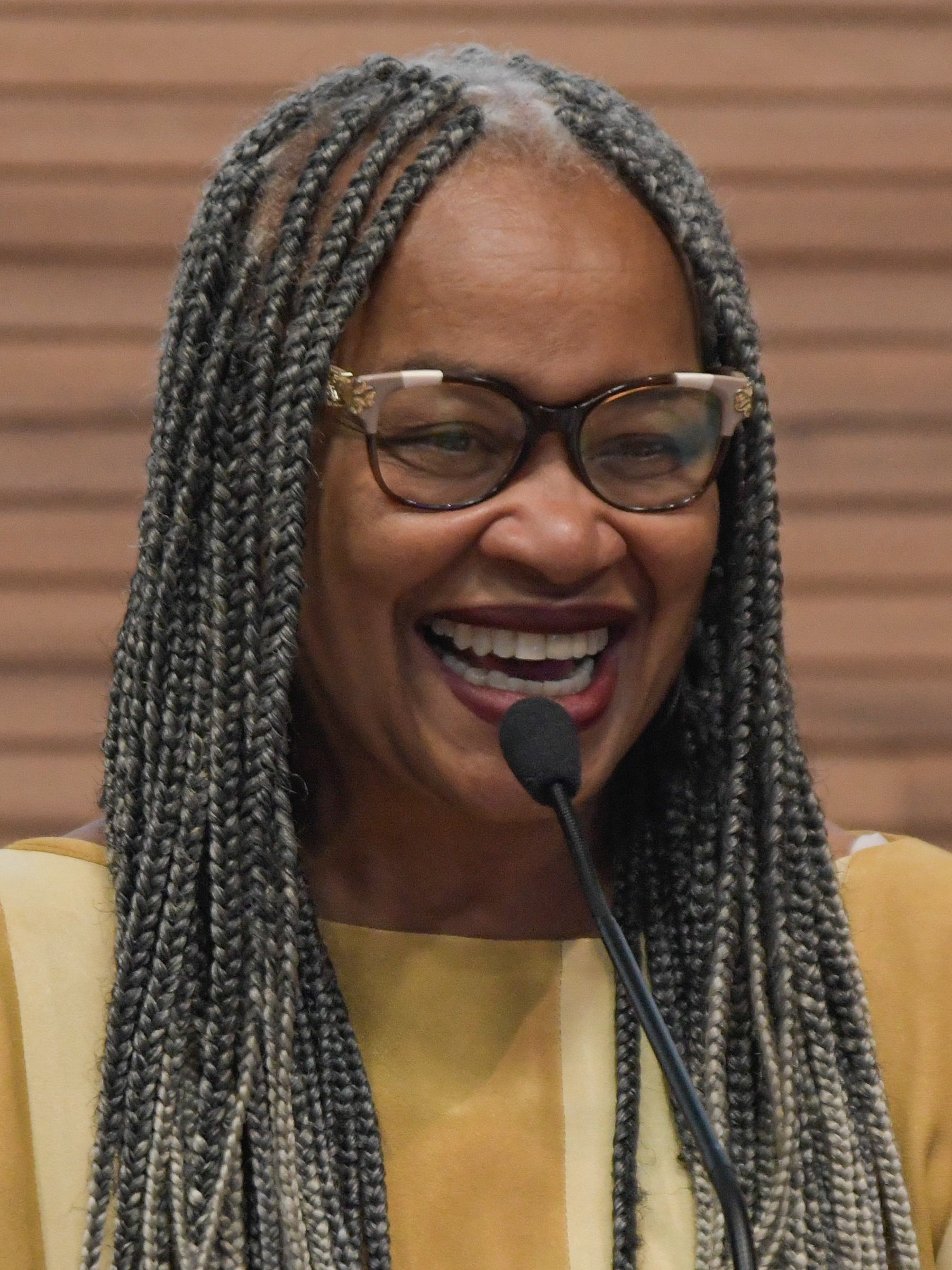
State Deputy
Olívia Santana (PCdoB)
from Salvador

== Opinion polls ==
=== First round ===
2024

Pollster/client(s)	Date(s) conducted	Sample size	Reis UNIÃO	Júnior MDB	Rosa PSOL	Marinho PSTU	Paixão UP	Damico PCB	Others	Abst. Undec.	Lead
Futura/100% Cidades	6–12 August	1,000	61.2%	13.8%	4.2%	0.6%	0.6%	0.1%	—N/a	19.3%	47.4%
Real Time Big Data	31 July–1 August	1,000	51%	22%	5%	—N/a	1%	1%	—N/a	20%	29%
Paraná Pesquisas	12–15 July	800	67.6%	12.5%	3%	2.8%	—N/a	—N/a	—N/a	14.2%	55.1%
Real Time Big Data	5–6 July	1,000	50%	20%	6%	0%	0%	1%	—N/a	23%	30%
Futura/100% Cidades	13–20 June	1,000	63.1%	12%	2.8%	1.5%	1.1%	0.1%	—N/a	19.3%	51.1%
Futura/100% Cidades	13–20 June	1,000	47.1%	9%	1.9%	2.3%	1.1%	0.2%	22.3% (Note: Lídice da Mata (PSB) with 11.3%; Olívia Santana (PCdoB) with 5.9% and João Roma (PL) with 5.1%)	16.7%	35.8%
Futura/100% Cidades	13–20 June	1,000	52.1%	9.8%	2.6%	1.9%	0.8%	0.2%	17.2% (Note: Lídice da Mata (PSB) with 12.8%; João Roma (PL) with 4.2% and Robinson Almeida (PT) with 0.2%)	15.4%	39.3%
5 June			The Brazil of Hope federation (PT, PCdoB and PV) decides to support Júnior's candidacy for mayor and nominates Fabya Reis as his running mate.								
Pollster/client(s)	Date(s) conducted	Sample size	Reis UNIÃO	Júnior MDB	Rosa PSOL	Marinho PSTU	Paixão UP	Damico PCB	Others	Abst. Undec.	Lead
Paraná Pesquisas	29 May–3 June	800	64%	11%	3.8%	3.3%	—N/a	—N/a	—N/a	18%	53%
13 May			Victor Marinho is announced as a potential candidate for mayor by the United Socialist Workers' Party (PSTU). Giovani Damico is announced as a potential candidate for mayor by the Brazilian Communist Party (PCB).								
12–30 April			The New Party (NOVO) withdraws Buck's candidacy in order to support Reis reelection bid. She is announced as a candidate for councillor of the Municipal Chamber of Salvador. The Liberal Party (PL) announces the support for Reis' reelection bid.								
Pollster/client(s)	Date(s) conducted	Sample size	Reis UNIÃO	Júnior MDB	Roma PL	Rosa PSOL	Buck NOVO	Paixão UP	Others	Abst. Undec.	Lead
Paraná Pesquisas	22–27 March	800	62.3%	13.8%	—N/a	2.8%	2.4%	—N/a	—N/a	18.9%	48.5%
Real Time Big Data	25–26 March	1,000	48%	18%	—N/a	7%	3%	—N/a	—N/a	24%	30%
Real Time Big Data	25–26 March	1,000	43%	18%	13%	7%	2%	—N/a	—N/a	17%	25%
19 March			Eslane Paixão is announced as a potential candidate for mayor by the Popular Unity (UP).								
Pollster/client(s)	Date(s) conducted	Sample size	Reis UNIÃO	Júnior MDB	Roma PL	Rosa PSOL	Buck NOVO		Others	Abst. Undec.	Lead
Atlas Intel	4–7 March	809	51.4%	18.4%	—N/a	8.4%	1.8%		—N/a	20%	33%
Atlas Intel	4–7 March	809	64.4%	23%	—N/a	10.4%	2.2%		—N/a	(Note: Valid votes)	41.4%
Paraná Pesquisas	18–23 January	802	59.9%	11.2%	6.1%	2.2%	1.4%		—N/a	19.2%	48.7%
Paraná Pesquisas	18–23 January	802	62.7%	12.1%	—N/a	2.9%	1.6%		—N/a	20.7%	50.6%

2023

Pollster/client(s)	Date(s) conducted	Sample size	Reis UNIÃO	Júnior MDB	Rosa PSOL	Buck NOVO	Santana PCdoB	da Mata PSB	Roma PL	Brito PSD	Others	Abst. Undec.	Lead
Atlas Intel	25–30 December	800	51.9%	12%	10%	4.3%	—N/a	—N/a	—N/a	—N/a	—N/a	21.8%	39.9%
16 December			The university professor and company administrator, Luciana Buck is announced as a potential candidate for mayor by the New Party (NOVO).										
Pollster/client(s)	Date(s) conducted	Sample size	Reis UNIÃO	Júnior MDB	Santana PCdoB	da Mata PSB	Brito PSD	Roma PL	Bacelar PV	Rosa PSOL	Others	Abst. Undec.	Lead
Instituto Veritá	12–13 December	1,018	32%	6%	2.8%	4.4%	2.8%	—N/a	1.8%	—N/a	14.9% (Note: Robinson Almeida (PT) with 9.5%; Raíssa Soares (PL) with 3.8% and Guilherme Bellintani (Ind.) with 1.6%)	35.4%	22.5%
Futura Inteligência	7–11 December	1,015	41.5%	5.4%	5%	10.7%	2.4%	5%	—N/a	0.8%	10.3% (Note: Pastor Sargento Isidório (Avante) with 7.7%; Guilherme Bellintani (Ind.) with 1.4% and Maria Marighella (PT) with 1.2%)	18.8%	30.8%
Futura Inteligência	7–11 December	1,015	41.3%	6%	9%	—N/a	2.9%	5.4%	—N/a	1.1%	15.4% (Note: Sargento Isidório (Avante) with 12.6%; Guilherme Bellintani (Ind.) with 1.6%; Robinson Almeida (PT) with 0.7% and Zé Trindade (PSB) with 0.5%)	18.8%	28.7%
Futura Inteligência	7–11 December	1,015	49.4%	8.4%	12.5%	—N/a	—N/a	6.7%	—N/a	1.3%	2.8% (Note: Robinson Almeida (PT))	18.9%	36.9%
1 September			Zé Trindade (PSB), president of the President of the Bahia State Urban Development Company and former councillor of Salvador, withdraws his potential candidacy for mayor.										
Pollster/client(s)	Date(s) conducted	Sample size	Reis UNIÃO	Júnior MDB	Santana PCdoB	da Mata PSB	Brito PSD	Roma PL	Bacelar PV	Rosa PSOL	Others	Abst. Undec.	Lead
Instituto Veritá	7–28 July	1,001	29.6%	9.2%	5.6%	5.1%	3.3%	3.1%	1.9%	—N/a	2.3% (Note: Non-specified)	39.9%	20.4%
Pollster/client(s)	Date(s) conducted	Sample size	Reis UNIÃO	Neto UNIÃO	da Mata PSB	Roma PL	Santana PCdoB	Júnior MDB	Bacelar PV	Brito PSD	Others	Abst. Undec.	Lead
Paraná Pesquisas	17–21 March	804	38.1%	—N/a	10.2%	7%	6.6%	4.5%	3.1%	2.6%	7.3% (Note: João Henrique Durval Carneiro (PRTB) with 2.5%; Guilherme Bellintani (Ind.) with 2.2%; Maria Marighella (PT) with 1.9% and Zé Trindade (PSB) with 0.7%)	20.6%	27.9%
Paraná Pesquisas	17–21 March	804	—N/a	60%	7.1%	5.7%	5.3%	3%	1.4%	1.6%	4.3% (Note: João Henrique Durval Carneiro (PRTB) with 1.7%; Guilherme Bellintani (Ind.) with 1.4%; Maria Marighella (PT) with 1% and Zé Trindade (PSB) with 0.2%)	11.5%	52.9%

=== Second round ===
These are the hypothetical scenarios of a second round.

Bruno Reis and Geraldo Júnior

Pollster/client(s)	Date(s) conducted	Sample size	Reis UNIÃO	Júnior MDB	Abst. Undec.	Lead
Real Time Big Data	5–6 July 2024	1,000	52%	24%	24%	28%
Futura/100% Cidades	13–20 June 2024	1,000	68.7%	19.7%	11.7%	49%
Real Time Big Data	25–26 March 2024	1,000	51%	24%	25%	27%

Hypothetical scenario with João Roma

Bruno Reis and João Roma (withdrawn)

Bruno Reis and João Roma

Pollster/client(s)	Date(s) conducted	Sample size	Reis UNIÃO	Roma PL	Abst. Undec.	Lead
Real Time Big Data	25–26 March 2024	1,000	47%	17%	36%	30%

=== Rejection of candidates ===
In some opinion polls, the interviewee can choose more than one alternative (the so-called "multiple rejection"), therefore, the sum of the percentages of all candidates can exceed 100% of the votes in some scenarios

Pollster/client(s)	Date(s) conducted	Sample size	Júnior MDB	Marinho PSTU	Rosa PSOL	Reis UNIÃO	Paixão UP	Marinho PSTU	Damico PCB	Could vote in anyone	Others	Abst. Undec.
Paraná Pesquisas	12–15 July 2024	800	37.1%	24.8%	20.4%	17.9%	—N/a	—N/a	—N/a	5.1%	—N/a	17%
5 June			The Brazil of Hope federation (PT, PCdoB and PV) decides to support Júnior's candidacy for mayor and nominates Fabya Reis as his running mate.									
Pollster/client(s)	Date(s) conducted	Sample size	Júnior MDB	Marinho PSTU	Rosa PSOL	Reis UNIÃO	Paixão UP	Marinho PSTU	Damico PCB	Could vote in anyone	Others	Abst. Undec.
Paraná Pesquisas	29 May–3 June 2024	800	38%	27.5%	24.6%	19.8%	—N/a	—N/a	—N/a	4%	—N/a	14.4%
13 May			Victor Marinho is announced as a potential candidate for mayor by the United Socialist Workers' Party (PSTU). Giovani Damico is announced as a potential candidate for mayor by the Brazilian Communist Party (PCB).									
12–30 April 2024			The New Party (NOVO) withdraws Buck's candidacy in order to support Reis reelection bid. She is announced as a candidate for councillor at the Municipal Chamber of Salvador. The Liberal Party (PL) announces the support for Reis' reelection bid.									
Pollster/client(s)	Date(s) conducted	Sample size	Roma PL	Júnior MDB	Reis UNIÃO	Rosa PSOL	Buck NOVO	Paixão UP		Could vote in anyone	Others	Abst. Undec.
Paraná Pesquisas	22–27 March 2024	800	—N/a	36.4%	23.6%	26%	26.6%	—N/a		2.5%	—N/a	13.9%
19 March 2024			Eslane Paixão is announced as a potential candidate for mayor by the Popular Unity (UP).									
Pollster/client(s)	Date(s) conducted	Sample size	Roma PL	Júnior MDB	Reis UNIÃO	Rosa PSOL	Buck NOVO	Could vote in anyone			Others	Abst. Undec.
Paraná Pesquisas	18–23 January 2024	802	30.7%	27.3%	19.5%	18%	16.1%	4.2%			—N/a	18.3%

== Outgoing Municipal Chamber ==
The result of the last municipal election and the current situation in the Municipal Chamber is given below:

Affiliation	Members		+/–
Affiliation	2020	2024	+/–
UNIÃO	didn't exist	6	▲6
PP	0	5	▲5
Republicanos	3	5	▲2
PSDB	3	4	▲1
PT	4	4	Steady
DC	1	3	▲2
PDT	2	3	▲1
PRD	didn't exist	2	▲2
PCdoB	2	2	Steady
PL	2	2	Steady
DEMOCRATA	0	1	▲1
PSD	1	1	Steady
PSB	1	1	Steady
PSOL	1	1	Steady
PV	1	1	Steady
MDB	2	1	▼1
PODE	2	1	▼1
Avante	1	0	▼1
Cidadania	1	0	▼1
MOBILIZA	1	0	▼1
Solidarity	1	0	▼1
PSC	1	extinct party (Note: The Social Christian Party (PSC) merged into Podemos in June 2023.)	▼1
PSL	1	extinct party (Note: Democrats (DEM) and the Social Liberal Party (PSL) merged into the Brazil Union in February 2022.)	▼1
PTB	2	extinct party (Note: Brazilian Labour Party (PTB) and Patriota merged into the Democratic Renewal Party (PRD) in November 2023.)	▼2
Patriota	3	extinct party (Note: Brazilian Labour Party (PTB) and Patriota merged into the Democratic Renewal Party (PRD) in November 2023.)	▼3
DEM	7	extinct party (Note: Democrats (DEM) and the Social Liberal Party (PSL) merged into the Brazil Union in February 2022.)	▼7
Total	43		

== Results ==
=== Mayor ===
Candidate	Running mate	Party	Votes	%
Bruno Reis (incumbent)	Ana Paula Matos (PDT)	Brazil Union	1,045,690	78.68
Kleber Rosa	Miralva Nascimento	Socialism and Liberty Party	138,610	10.43
Geraldo Júnior	Fabya Reis (PT)	Brazilian Democratic Movement	137,298	10.33
Eslane Paixão	Giovana Ferreira	Popular Unity	5,513	0.41
Giovani Damico	Cheyenne Ayalla	Brazilian Communist Party	1,364	0.10
Victor Marinho	Edson Santana	United Socialist Workers' Party	510	0.04
Silvano Alves	Roque Júnior	Workers' Cause Party	190	
Total			1,328,985	100.00
Valid votes			1,328,985	88.08
Invalid votes			125,340	8.31
Blank votes			54,542	3.61
Total votes			1,508,867	100.00
Registered voters/turnout			1,969,757	76.60
UNIÃO hold				

=== Municipal Chamber ===
Party or alliance		Votes	%	Seats	+/–
Brazil Union		190,950	14.24	7	New
Progressistas		139,132	10.38	5	▲5
PSDB Cidadania; Federation	Brazilian Social Democracy Party	135,476	10.10	5	▲2
PSDB Cidadania; Federation	Cidadania	20,956	1.56	1	Steady
Democratic Labour Party		114,134	8.51	4	▲2
Republicans		113,389	8.46	4	▲1
Christian Democracy		74,333	5.54	2	▲1
Liberal Party		73,615	5.49	2	Steady
Brazil of Hope	Workers' Party	67,382	5.03	1	▼3
Brazil of Hope	Communist Party of Brazil	32,014	2.39	2	Steady
Brazil of Hope	Green Party	17,524	1.31	1	Steady
Democratic Renewal Party		65,266	4.87	2	New
Podemos		56,720	4.23	2	Steady
PSOL REDE; Federation	Socialism and Liberty Party	46,975	3.50	2	▲1
PSOL REDE; Federation	Sustainability Network	12,743	0.95	0	Steady
Social Democratic Party		45,735	3.41	1	Steady
Brazilian Socialist Party		38,774	2.89	1	Steady
Brazilian Democratic Movement		37,274	2.78	1	▼1
Brazilian Woman's Party		17,918	1.34	0	Steady
New Party		13,520	1.01	0	Steady
National Mobilization		9,559	0.71	0	▼1
Solidariedade		7,380	0.55	0	▼1
Avante		6,029	0.45	0	▼1
Popular Unity		1,779	0.13	0	Steady
Brazilian Labour Renewal Party		1,477	0.11	0	Steady
Brazilian Communist Party		538	0.04	0	Steady
United Socialist Workers' Party		314	0.02	0	Steady
Total		1,340,906	100.00	43	–
Valid votes		1,340,906	88.87		
Invalid votes		98,855	6.55		
Blank votes		69,106	4.58		
Total votes		1,508,867	100.00		
Registered voters/turnout		1,969,757	76.60		
