= Mário Kertész =

Brazilian politician and radio host

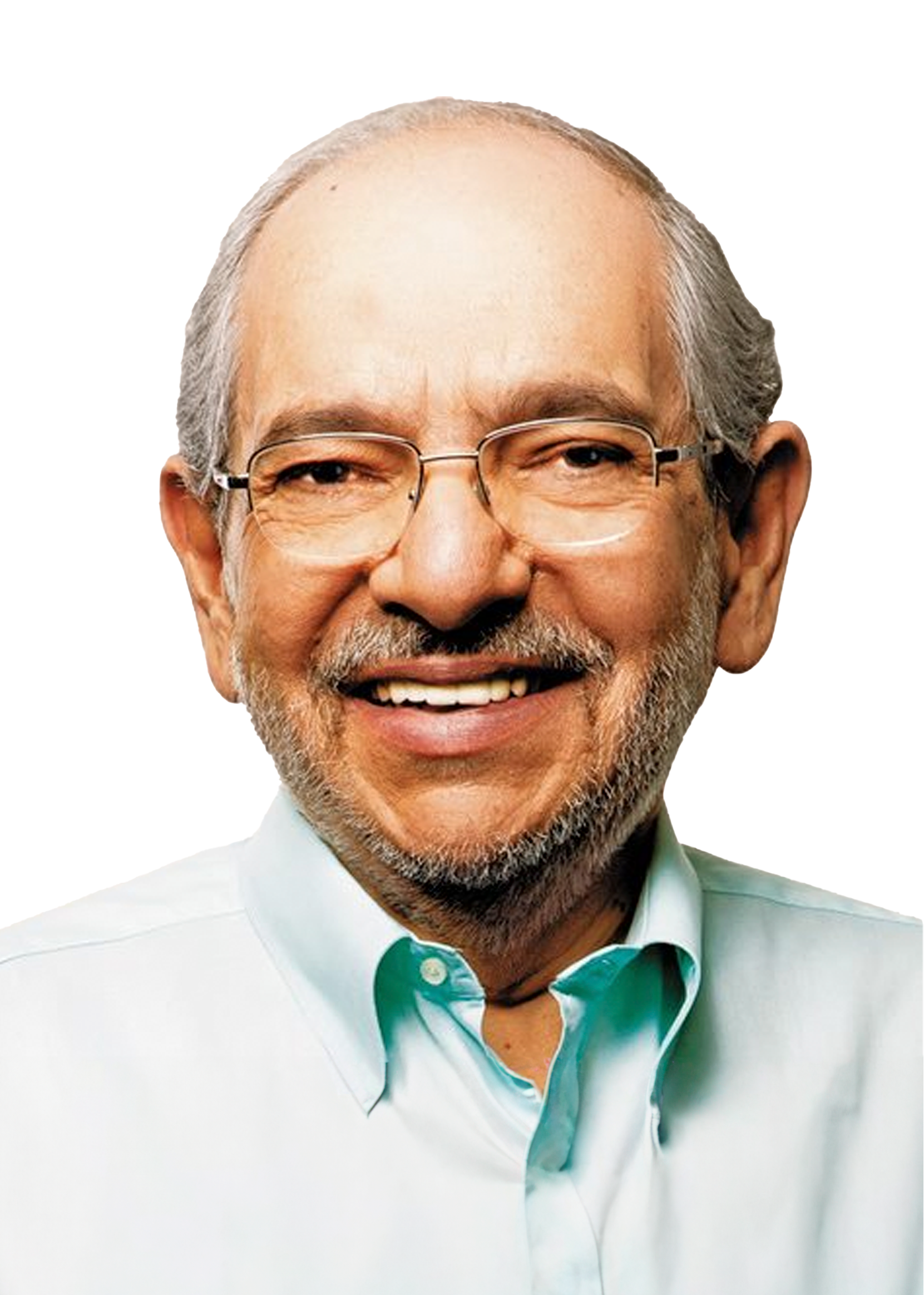
- Kertész in 2020

Mayor of Salvador
- In office March 1979 – November 1981
- Preceded by: Edvaldo Pereira de Brito
- Succeeded by: Renan Baleeiro

Mayor of Salvador
- In office January 1, 1986 – January 1, 1989
- Vice Mayor: Marcelo Ferreira Duarte
- Preceded by: Manoel Figueiredo Castro
- Succeeded by: Fernando José

State Secretary of Planning, Science, and Technology of Bahia
- In office March 15, 1971 – March 15, 1975
- Governor: Antônio Carlos Magalhães

Personal details
- Born: Mário de Mello Kertész; March 21, 1944 (age 82) Salvador, Bahia, Brazil
- Party: National Renewal Alliance (1978–1980); Brazilian Democratic Movement (1980–1988); Democratic Labour Party (1988–1990); Social Labor Party (1990–1993); Brazilian Democratic Movement (2011–2012)
- Spouse(s): Eliana Kertész; Silvania Rocha
- Education: Federal University of Bahia
- Occupation: Businessperson, radio personality

Mário de Melo Kertész (March 21, 1944) is a Brazilian politician, teacher, business administrator, entrepreneur and broadcaster.

Kertész's political career spans across various roles, including a stint as the Secretary of Planning, Science, and Technology for the state of Bahia from 1971 to 1975. He is also known for his involvement in local journalism, founding "Jornal da Metrópole" and "Metrópole Radio."

Born in Salvador to a Hungarian-Jewish father and an Amazonian mother, Kertész grew up to become a polyglot, fluent in multiple languages. He graduated in Business Administration from the Federal University of Bahia and furthered his studies abroad in Spain and France. His early career in public service began at the age of 22 as chief of staff to the Finance Secretary during the tenure of Bahia's Governor Antônio Carlos Magalhães.

In his first term as mayor from 1979 to 1981, Kertész implemented several significant projects, including the creation of urban services such as the company Limpurb and the public transportation company known as 'Transur'. He also initiated major urban development projects like the renovation of the Historic Center of Salvador. After leaving office, Kertész broke from his political allies in the Carlist movement and ran for mayor again in 1985, succeeding in the first popular election for the position after military rule ended.

During his second term from 1986 to 1989, Kertész continued his efforts in modernizing Salvador, overseeing landmark projects such as the construction of the Tomé de Sousa Palace and the establishment of the Fábrica de Cidades, a facility aimed at producing low-cost, high-quality public buildings. His term also saw significant political shifts in Bahia, with Kertész supporting Waldir Pires in the 1986 gubernatorial race.

In the 1990s, after leaving politics, Kertész turned to media, becoming a prominent figure in Salvador's radio industry. He established a successful radio career with Metrópole Radio and later expanded into television and print media. He founded "Metrópole Magazine" and launched the "Jornal da Metrópole," continuing to shape public discourse in the region.

Kertész's political career was marked by his strategic alliances and his shift from the Brazilian Democratic Movement (PMDB) to supporting left-wing candidates, such as Nelson Pelegrino in the 2012 Salvador mayoral race. Despite his political influence, he eventually stepped away from public office, opting to focus on private enterprise and media ventures.

Throughout his life, Kertész was married three times, with his second wife, Eliana Kertész, a former city councilwoman, being a significant figure in his personal and professional life until her death in 2017. He remarried in 2019 to Silvania Rocha. Kertész is considered a key figure in Salvador's political and media landscape.

== Biography ==
=== Early years and education ===
Born in Salvador, the capital of the state of Bahia, Mário Kertész is the son of an Amazonian mother and a Hungarian father of Jewish origin. Mário became a polyglot, speaking Portuguese, French, Spanish, English and Italian.

He graduated in Business Administration from the Federal University of Bahia (UFBA). He did postgraduate studies abroad, studying in Spain and France.

=== Political ===
He began his public life at the age of 22, as chief of staff to Finance Secretary Luís Sande, during the administration of the then mayor of Salvador, Antônio Carlos Magalhães, known popularly only by the acronym ACM, in 1967.

During ACM' first term as governor of Bahia, between 1971 and 1975, Kertész, at the age of 26, was the first head of the Secretariat of Planning, Science and Technology, the body responsible for setting up the Bahia Administrative Center, the Pituaçu Metropolitan Park and the first stage of the renovation of Salvador's Historic Center.

He served as Magalhães' chief of staff when the politician took over the presidency of the state-owned company Eletrobrás between 1975 and 1978. He was appointed mayor of Salvador by Magalhães, as a 'bionic mayor' – the name given to mayors appointed by allies of the Brazilian military dictatorship – in his second administration. The main works and achievements of this first administration were the creation of Limpurb (Empresa de Limpeza Urbana de Salvador), responsible for the city's garbage collection, and Transur (Companhia de Transportes Urbanos de Salvador), all in 1979. Transur was later abolished in 1997.

At the end of his term as mayor of Salvador in 1981, Mário Kertész broke with “Carlism” (the name given to the political movement that emerged in Bahia under the leadership of Antonio Carlos Magalhães) and joined the Brazilian Democratic Movement Party (PMDB), making his then-wife, Eliana Kertész, the most voted councillor in Salvador in 1982, receiving more than 50 000 votes.

After the opening of direct elections to the mayors of the capitals with the end of the Military Dictatorship in 1985, he defeated federal deputy Marcelo Cordeiro at the party convention, becoming a candidate for mayor of Salvador. On November 15 of the same year, he was elected the first mayor of Salvador by popular vote, beating Edvaldo Brito, with the support of the left parties like Democratic Labour Party (PDT) and Brazilian Socialist Party (PSB), after 21 years of military rule.

During his second term, he helped to elect Waldir Pires governor of Bahia in 1986, with the support of other 'ex-Carlistas', such as then senators Luís Viana Filho and Jutahy Magalhães, then federal deputy Ruy Bacelar and the former mayor of Guanambi, Nilo Coelho, his friend from youth, chosen as vice-president on the ticket of one of the leaders of the PMDB's “historic group”. It was during this second administration that Mário Kertész carried out the works designed by Lina Bo Bardi and the Rio de Janeiro architect João Filgueiras Lima, known as “Lelé”. Among others, the Tomé de Sousa Palace, the current headquarters of Salvador City Hall, built in steel and glass in 14 days and inaugurated on May 16, 1986; The installation of the Fábrica de Cidades (FAEC) in an area of 140. 000 m², with the aim of producing large-scale reinforced mortar pieces for the construction of various community facilities with quality, speed and low cost, such as municipal schools built in reinforced mortar; It also created of the Official Gazette of the Municipality.

He organized the candidacy of Gilberto Gil, president of the Gregório de Mattos Foundation, to succeed him in 1988, which was vetoed by governor Waldir Pires. As a result, he teamed up with communications businessman Pedro Irujo to launch the candidacy of broadcaster Fernando José for mayor of the capital, who was elected in that election.

The following year, 1989, Fernando José broke off political agreements, abandoned ongoing projects, terminated contracts, stopped work and, with the support of the A Tarde newspaper, launched a fierce campaign against Kertész. He ran again for mayor of Salvador in 1992. He lost the election to Lídice da Mata and abandoned his political career to dedicate himself to private enterprise.

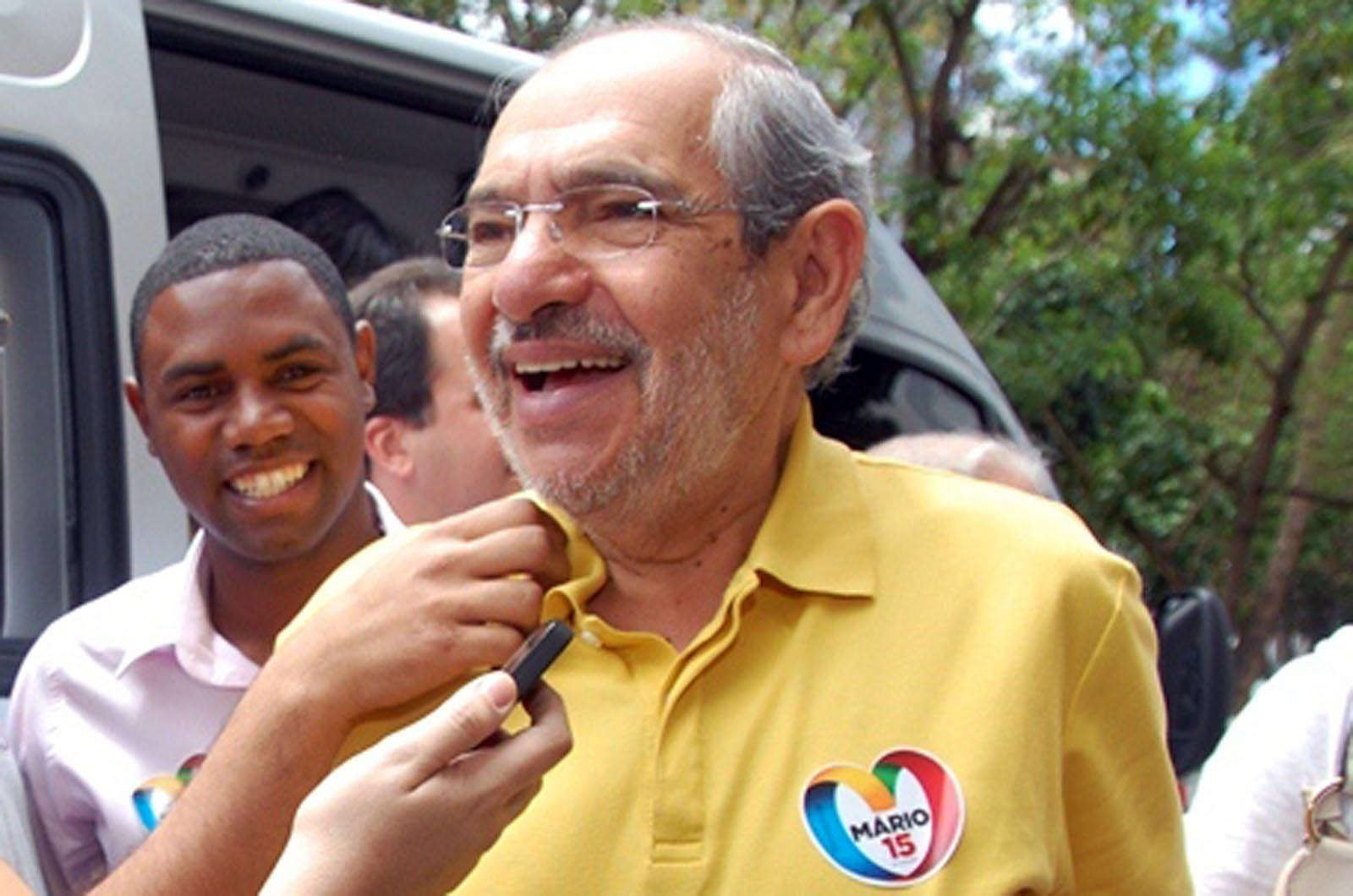
Mário Kertész in the 2012 municipal elections in Salvador.

At the invitation of the PMDB, he joined the party in 2011 and was launched as a candidate for Mayor of Salvador, after 19 years away from party politics. In the 2012 elections, he only came third in the first round and broke with the PMDB, which supported the Carlist candidate ACM Neto, to support the PT candidate, Nelson Pelegrino.

== Private initiative ==
While serving as Mayor of Salvador, Mário Kertész began his journey as a radio host, using the platform to report on his administration. He hosted a radio program to share updates on municipal projects and initiatives, aligning with the political vision that had brought him back to the Tomé de Souza Palace for a second term. This vision aimed to bridge the gap between government and the people, symbolized by the relocation of the government headquarters to Praça Thomé de Souza, the first public square representing the three branches of government in Brazil. Through this program, Kertész established a direct line of communication with the population, broadcasting across multiple radio stations.

The growing influence of the program, however, led to threats against the broadcasting network, as most radio concessionaires feared political reprisals. At the time, Antonio Carlos Magalhães (ACM), a declared political adversary of Kertész, served as Brazil's Minister of Communications (1985–1990).

To ensure the continuity of the political project, a group led by businessman Alceu Lisboa, active in the education sector, acquired three financially struggling radio stations, which had suffered from the wave of concessions issued during the José Sarney administration.

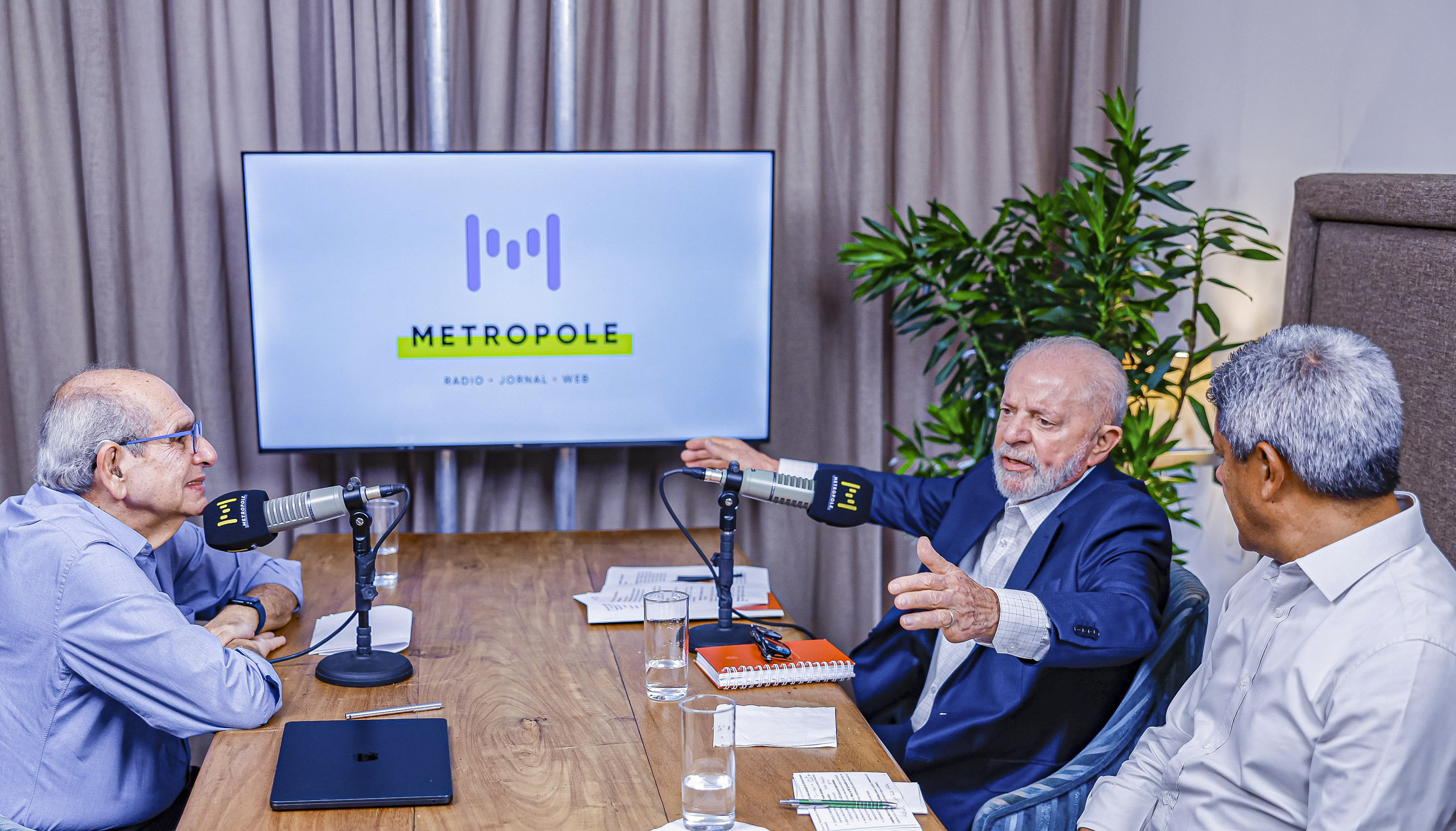
Mário (left) interviewing the president of Brazil, Luiz Inácio Lula da Silva and the governor of Bahia, Jerônimo Rodrigues, in 2024.

When Kertész decided to step away from politics, effectively halting the project, Alceu Lisboa’s group lost interest in maintaining the radio stations and sold them. Subsequently, Kertész’s family acquired the stations but later divested Itaparica FM and unsuccessfully negotiated the sale of Rádio Clube to the Assemblies of God. The family retained Rádio Cidade, which eventually became Rádio Metrópole.

Over time, Kertész expanded his journalistic endeavors, launching new projects: Metrópole Magazine in 2007, the Jornal da Metrópole, in a following year a free tabloid distributed at key locations across Salvador and even TV Metrópole, hosted on the radio station’s website. During this period, Kertész also completed his professional training as a radio broadcaster.

=== Jornal da Bahia ===
Founded and presided over by João Falcão, a communist activist, the Jornal da Bahia emerged as a voice of opposition to the dictatorship and to Antônio Carlos Magalhães government. The newspaper went into decline after being sold in 1983 to ACM himself, who had long sought to shut it down. The end of the military dictatorship, coupled with its sale to its primary adversary, caused the Jornal da Bahia to lose the qualities that had once attracted and inspired its readers, further exacerbating its already precarious financial situation.

In 1990, amid the ongoing crisis, the shareholders decided to bring in an external executive. Mário Kertész was elected at a shareholders' meeting to serve as President of the Executive Board for a two-year term and was re-elected once. During his tenure, from 1990 to 1994, Kertész adopted a more popular editorial approach for the Jornal da Bahia, inspired by Notícias Populares – a popular newspaper based in São Paulo. He reduced the number of pages and relocated the editorial office to the same building as Rádio Cidade to cut costs.

However, these efforts were largely undone by the economic recession that hit Brazil, marked by hyperinflation (1,200% annually) during the José Sarney administration and the monetary confiscation imposed by the Fernando Collor de Mello government. These factors ultimately led to the newspaper's closure in February 1994.

== Personal life ==
He has five children, including Duda Kertész, president of Johnson & Johnson HealthE. He married three times. Initially, to Alzira, with whom he had a son. Later, he married the politician and artist Eliana Kertész, with whom he had four children. Eliana died at the age of 71 in 2017, victim of lung cancer. After widowhood, he remarried in 2019, to Silvania Rocha, in a ceremony in Salvador.
