= Duda Kertész =

Brazilian business executive

Maria Eduarda Kertész
- Born: Salvador, Bahia
- Education: Fundação Getúlio Vargas
- Occupation: Business executive
- Years active: 1993 -present
- Known for: President of Johnson & Johnson HealthE

Maria Eduarda "Duda" Kertész or Duda Kertész is a Brazilian business executive who is President of the Johnson & Johnson HealthE business division in the U.S. She previously served as president of the consumer products division in Brazil. In 2015, she was named one of the 14 most powerful women in Brazil by Forbes, and received a Luminary Award from the Healthcare Businesswomen's Association in 2017.

== Early life and education ==
She graduated with a degree in business administration from the Fundação Getúlio Vargas in São Paulo, Brazil in 1994.

== Career ==
Kertész began her career at PwC in Boston, Massachusetts, where she worked for two years before returning to Brazil. She held a position with Schering-Plough for three years before rejoining Johnson & Johnson Consumer Products in 1999 in various senior brand manager positions.

She was named President of Johnson & Johnson's consumer business in Brazil in 2011. She led the division to a sales increase of 80% over the following year. In March 2016, she led Johnson & Johnson's acquisition of the Hipoglós rash cream business from competitor Procter & Gamble. Kertész also oversaw the company's implementation of the Women's Leadership Initiative program to help erase gender bias in the workplace.

Kertész was named President of Johnson & Johnson's HealthE division in 2016 and is responsible for overseeing the company's Oral Care, Wound Care and Baby Care businesses in the U.S.

== Personal life ==
Kertész is a member of the Movimento Mulher 360, an organization for Brazilian businesswomen that aims to expand female participation in business. She lives in the United States with her two children. She is the daughter of Mário Kertész, a journalist and politician who was once mayor of Salvador.
