= Antônio Carlos Magalhães =

Brazilian politician

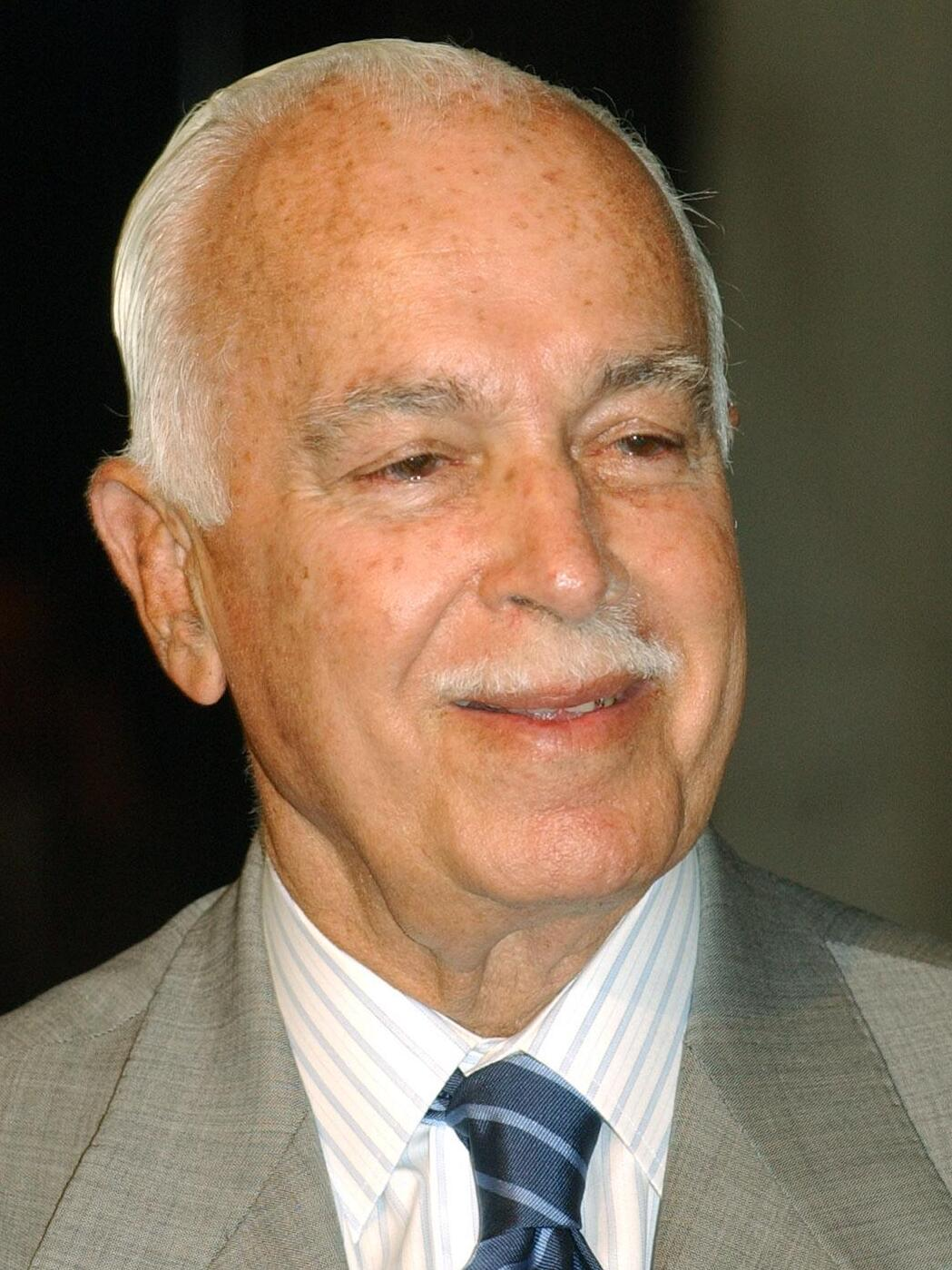
- ACM in 2007

Senator for Bahia
- In office 1 February 2003 – 20 July 2007
- Preceded by: ACM Júnior
- Succeeded by: ACM Júnior
- In office 1 February 1995 – 30 May 2001
- Preceded by: Ruy Bacelar
- Succeeded by: ACM Júnior

President of the Federal Senate
- In office 4 February 1997 – 14 February 2001
- Preceded by: José Sarney
- Succeeded by: Jader Barbalho

Governor of Bahia
- In office 15 March 1991 – 12 April 1994
- Vice Governor: Paulo Souto
- Preceded by: Nilo Moraes Coelho
- Succeeded by: Ruy Trindade
- In office 15 March 1979 – 15 March 1983
- Vice Governor: Luís Viana Neto
- Preceded by: Roberto Santos
- Succeeded by: João Durval Carneiro
- In office 15 March 1971 – 15 March 1975
- Vice Governor: Menandro Minahim
- Preceded by: Luís Viana Filho
- Succeeded by: Roberto Santos

Minister of Communications
- In office 15 March 1985 – 15 March 1990
- President: José Sarney
- Preceded by: Haroldo Corrêa de Mattos
- Succeeded by: Ozires Silva

President of Eletrobras
- In office 7 November 1975 – 30 May 1978
- Nominated by: Ernesto Geisel
- Preceded by: Mario Penna Bhering
- Succeeded by: Arnaldo Rodrigues Barbalho

Federal Deputy for Bahia
- In office 6 April 1970 – 1 February 1971
- Constituency: At-large
- In office 2 February 1959 – 10 February 1967
- Constituency: At-large

Mayor of Salvador
- In office 10 February 1967 – 6 April 1970
- Preceded by: Julival Rebouças
- Succeeded by: Clériston Andrade

State Deputy of Bahia
- In office 7 April 1955 – 2 February 1959
- Constituency: At-large

Personal details
- Born: Antônio Carlos Peixoto de Magalhães; 4 September 1927 Salvador, Bahia, Brazil
- Died: 20 July 2007 (aged 79) São Paulo, Brazil
- Party: UDN (1952–65); ARENA (1965–80); PDS (1980–86); PFL (1986–2007); DEM (2007)
- Spouse: Arlette Maron (m. 1952)
- Children: Luís Eduardo Magalhães; ACM Júnior; Tereza Helena
- Parents: Francisco Peixoto de Magalhães Neto (father); Helena Celestino de Magalhães (mother)
- Relatives: ACM Neto (grandson)
- Education: Federal University of Bahia
- Profession: physician; journalist; politician
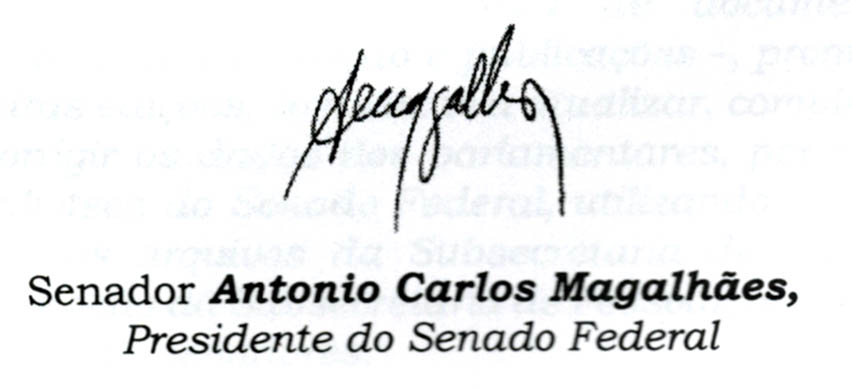
- Signature

Antônio Carlos Peixoto de Magalhães (4 September 1927 – 20 July 2007), commonly known as Antônio Carlos Magalhães or by his initials ACM, was a Brazilian physician, businessman, and politician, who served three times as both senator and governor of Bahia. He is best known for his influence as a national power broker, through his political machine that dominated his state's politics and national media.

Born in Salvador, Bahia to a political family, ACM studied medicine. While still a student, he worked as a reporter and began building ties to the media, alongside early roles in public administration. In the 1950s he joined the conservative National Democratic Union (UDN), won a seat as a state deputy, and later became a federal deputy in 1959.

ACM's rise accelerated under Brazil’s military regime. In 1967, after joining the pro-military National Renewal Alliance (ARENA), he was appointed mayor of Salvador, where his administration was associated with major urban works and an assertive approach to land occupations and redevelopment. ACM went on to serve two indirectly selected terms as governor of Bahia during the dictatorship era from 1971 to 1975 and 1979 to 1983, consolidating a dominant intra-government coalition in Bahia through governance marked by patronage, control of local alliances, and confrontation with segments of the independent press.

During the transition to democracy, ACM helped found the Liberal Front Party (PFL) and became a leading figure in the congressional bloc that supported President José Sarney. Serving as Minister of Communications from 1985 to 1990, he oversaw telecommunications and broadcast regulation during a period of rapid expansion in radio and television, and his tenure became closely associated with the discretionary distribution of broadcast concessions, praised as infrastructure expansion and criticized by as reinforcing clientelism and political-media entanglements. Returning to elective office in the 1990s, he again governed Bahia from 1991 to 1994 and then built national influence in the Senate, culminating in his election as President of the Federal Senate. In 2001 he resigned amid the electronic voting secrecy scandal, later returning to the Senate in 2003 until his death in 2007.

== Early life and medical career ==
Antônio Carlos Peixoto de Magalhães was born in Salvador, Bahia, on 4 September 1927 to Francisco Peixoto de Magalhães Neto and Helena Celestina de Magalhães. ACM had one brother Ângelo Mário Peixoto de Magalhães, a civil servant and public relations expert, who served as a state and federal deputy before dying in 2005.

ACM's father, a wealthy doctor born in Salvador, Bahia to Portuguese immigrants from Medelo, a village in Fafe, served as a Federal Deputy for three terms before the advent of the Estado Novo.

=== Family background and education ===
ACM attended local primary and secondary schools before entering the Medical School of Bahia, later incorporated into the Federal University of Bahia, where he studied medicine. He began working as a reporter in the 1940s while still a student, an early association with the media that preceded his political career. He graduated in 1952.

=== Medical training and early professional work ===
After graduation, ACM practiced in Bahia's public health service and maintained links to the medical school, where later institutional biographies list him as having taught. A science magazine published by FAPESP reports that his father was a physician and professor at the Medical School of Bahia and that Magalhães served as an assistant in hygiene at the school early in his career. These activities preceded his full-time entry into politics in the mid 1950s.

== Entry into politics (1950s–1964) ==
=== Public service beginnings ===
Before seeking elected office, Magalhães worked exclusively in public administration. He began as an official in the cabinet of Edgar Rego dos Santos, then rector of the Medical School of Bahia, and was later transferred to the Legislative Assembly of Bahia, where he served as an editor of debates. Accounts of his early years in the Assembly describe a combative temperament and note incidents in which he allegedly intervened in floor discussions and clashed physically with deputy João Carlos Tourinho Dantas. Commentators state that he avoided disciplinary dismissal due to the protection of powerful patrons.

=== Early alliances and policy interests ===
Analysts and obituaries characterize his early political trajectory as shaped by mentorship from prominent Bahian leaders, including Juracy Magalhães, Antônio Balbino, and Rego dos Santos, the rector, and by support for national developmental agendas in the late 1950s.

In 1959, during the UDN convention, he reportedly supported Juracy Magalhães, the paternalistic governor of Bahia, against Jânio Quadros, the populist conservative, reflecting his alignment with established party figures at the time.

=== State deputy and federal deputy ===
Magalhães joined the National Democratic Union (UDN) in the early 1950s and secured his first mandate as a state deputy in 1954 in a supplementary election for the district of Oliveira dos Brejinhos, a locality identified traditional coronelismo in the deep Bahian interior. He took office in April 1955 and served a single term in the Legislative Assembly of Bahia, after which he won a seat for Bahia in the federal Chamber of Deputies and took office in February 1959.

Contemporary and retrospective accounts remark that, prior to 1964, he struggled to consolidate a broad electoral base.

Reports from his first term as a state deputy attribute to him a series of confrontational gestures, including public accusations against journalist Jorge Calmon over campaign finances connected to a gubernatorial race, as well as an incident in which he attempted to seize the floor microphone from fellow deputy Cruz Rios during a speech in the Assembly.

At the time of the 1964 military coup, ACM was serving as a federal deputy. Several sources describe him then as a figure with limited popular appeal and without established leadership stature, arguing that his political profile rose chiefly during the subsequent authoritarian period.

== Military regime period (1964–1985) ==
=== Mayor of Salvador (1967–1970) ===
Magalhães left the Chamber of Deputies to serve as appointed mayor of Salvador on 10 February 1967, during the early years of Brazil's military regime, and remained in office until 6 April 1970. Contemporary institutional records and later scholarship describe the position as part of the regime's practice of political appointments in state capitals, and note that the move consolidated his emergence as a dominant figure in Bahian politics. He was succeeded in the post by Clériston Andrade.

==== Administrative agenda and machine-building ====
Studies of urban policy in Salvador identify his administration with high-visibility works and a rhetoric of "eradicating invasions," particularly along the seafront that was undergoing real-estate valorization. Academic analyses cite interventions against informal and irregular occupations in areas such as Bico de Ferro, Ondina and Boca do Rio, and link these actions to a broader remaking of the waterfront for middle-class leisure and circulation. The period also saw the layout of the Parque Jardim dos Namorados on the Pituba shoreline, conceived at the end of the 1960s and later redeveloped.

Evaluations are mixed: researchers note the expansion of public leisure spaces, while also documenting forcible removals and conflicts with residents affected by clearance policies.

ACM described his strategy stating that "here the future is built without destroying the past."

==== Relations with the press and opponents ====
According to journalists and later academic work, Magalhães's years as mayor marked the beginning of a sustained confrontation with the independent Jornal da Bahia. Media historians report that, from 1968 onward, the newspaper and its editors faced legal and economic pressure, while supporters of the administration and security officials targeted the outlet amid the context of censorship after Institutional Act Number Five, which was the major legislation that backed up the broader national crackdown.

João Carlos Teixeira Gomes, the paper's editor and later biographer of Magalhães, characterized the mayor's conduct toward the press as coercive and documented a pattern of intimidation, a view echoed in subsequent studies of the Bahian media field.

These accounts have been contested by allies who emphasized the administration's public works and modernization agenda.

=== First governorship of Bahia (1971–1975) ===
Magalhães assumed the governorship on 15 March 1971 during the presidency of Emílio Garrastazu Médici, after an indirect selection process steered by the federal executive in consultation with state-level majorities of the pro-government party, Aliança Renovadora Nacional (ARENA). Contemporary coverage in A Tarde reported that the new governors, including Magalhães, had been chosen directly by Médici, and academic analyses situate his first administration within the peak years of Brazil's authoritarian "economic miracle."

==== Administrative agenda and political machine-building ====
Political scientists and historians identify this term as the period when Magalhães consolidated a dominant intra-ARENA faction in Bahia and began to articulate what later observers would call carlismo, combining control of formal institutions, the state administration, and interfaces with private enterprise. In industrial policy, his government promoted the petrochemical complex at Camaçari and associated logistics. Although the complex's conception pre-dated his term, the administration invested political capital in its local implantation and publicized it as a watershed for state industrialization; the Porto de Aratu project was reformulated and built to serve bulk flows required by the Camaçari complex and the Centro Industrial de Aratu.

Contemporary and retrospective accounts disagree over authorship and priority, with some attributing the original petrochemical concept to economist Rômulo Almeida and crediting Magalhães chiefly for execution and political sponsorship. Commentators and critics also described a governing style centered on high-visibility public works and an ambitious publicity apparatus, arguing that some projects were of questionable priority and execution.

ACM in 1972.

==== Relations with the federal regime and opponents ====
Scholarly treatments depict Magalhães as closely aligned with the military regime during his first term, benefiting from the centralized appointment system and governing amid the expanded powers instituted after Institutional Act No. 5 in December 1968. He publicly defended hardline measures as necessary for order, according to contemporaneous accounts.

The governorship also marked an escalation of conflict with the Jornal da Bahia. Documented measures included suspension of all official advertising to the paper, pressure on private advertisers using tax and regulatory leverage, and the use of the National Security Law in legal actions against the paper's editor João Carlos Teixeira Gomes after reporting on a firm linked to Magalhães. Teixeira Gomes and later media studies further describe attempts to influence shareholders as part of a broader strategy to subordinate or silence the outlet; allied narratives disputed these characterizations and emphasized the administration's modernization agenda.

According to these sources, the campaign against the paper drew attention from press-freedom organizations; the Inter-American Press Association reportedly labeled Magalhães a leading adversary of the Brazilian press during the period, and a complaint under the National Security Law against Teixeira Gomes was rejected by a military court.

=== President of Eletrobras (1975–1978) ===
After leaving the Bahia governorship in 1975, Magalhães was appointed president of Centrais Elétricas Brasileiras S.A. (Eletrobras) in November of that year during the administration of President Ernesto Geisel. Institutional profiles list his tenure through 1978, when he resigned to return to state politics. Contemporary and retrospective accounts describe his period at the utility as part of the federal government's effort to align key infrastructure companies with state governors and party leaders during the later years of the military regime.

=== Second governorship of Bahia (1979–1983) ===
Magalhães returned to the Bahia governorship on 15 March 1979 after being chosen in 1978 by the state electoral college, which operated under the rules of the two-party system maintained by the military government. He served until 15 March 1983, with Luís Viana Neto as vice governor.

==== Administrative agenda and political machine-building ====
Analysts describe the 1979–1983 term as a continuation of strategies developed in his first administration, with consolidation of a dominant intra-ARENA current and close coordination between the state executive, allied mayors, and sectors of private enterprise. The government emphasized large-scale works and industrial policy. Scholarly treatments of Bahia's political economy situate this period within the maturation of carlismo, a subnational machine that combined administrative capacity with patronage networks and media influence.

==== Relations with the federal regime and opponents ====
During his second term, Magalhães remained aligned with the federal authorities as the Geisel–Figueiredo opening unfolded, benefiting from the appointment rules that still governed state capitals and from the state electoral college that had returned him to office. Commentators and media historians also connect this period to continuing disputes with the independent press in Bahia, which accused the administration of using economic pressure and legal actions to constrain coverage; allies disputed the charges and highlighted modernization goals.

Magalhães was also known for his harsh treatment of opponents of the regime and for his ability to make deals. This led to some of his opponents dubbing him "Toninho Malvadeza" (Little Tony Evilness).

=== Transition to democracy and party building ===
==== Role in the formation of the PFL ====
During Brazil's gradual political opening in the early 1980s, Magalhães joined a cohort of leaders who broke with the pro-regime Democratic Social Party (PDS) and helped create the Liberal Front Party (Partido da Frente Liberal, PFL). The new party aligned with opposition forces to support an indirect presidential transition in 1985, positioning traditional state-based machines within a changing party system and giving their leaders national leverage during redemocratization.

=== Alignment with Neves and Sarney ===
The PFL backed the opposition ticket of Tancredo Neves and José Sarney in the 1985 Electoral College. After Neves fell ill and died before inauguration, Sarney assumed the presidency and relied on PFL support in Congress. Magalhães emerged as a key leader within the PFL's congressional bloc, using the alliance to negotiate cabinet positions and influence the transition agenda, including in the 1987–1988 National Constituent Assembly.

When accused of corruption inregards to alliance shifts, he once said "I have good and bad friends, but I only govern with the good ones."

=== Minister of Communications (1985–1990) ===
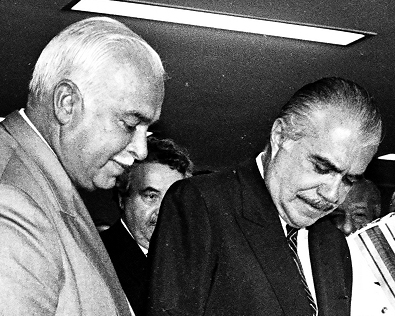
ACM with José Sarney in 1988.

==== Policy program and modernization ====
Sarney appointed Magalhães Minister of Communications in March 1985. The ministry oversaw postal services, telecommunications, and broadcast regulation during a period of rapid expansion in television and radio. Official and academic accounts credit the administration with accelerating network coverage, extending infrastructure to interior regions, and promoting modernization of state-owned telecoms, while critics argued that expansion proceeded without sufficient structural reform of media ownership and regulation.

==== Broadcast licensing and media relations ====
Scholars have documented that, under the discretionary licensing rules then in force, the ministry distributed a significant number of radio and television concessions during the transition years, including to sitting politicians and their associates. Studies argue that these allocations bolstered legislative coalitions during the Constituent Assembly and reinforced the overlap between political power and regional media markets, particularly in the Northeast. Magalhães rejected allegations of favoritism and presented licensing as part of an effort to expand access and competition in broadcasting.

==== Criticisms and debates over concessions ====
The licensing surge became a focus of criticism from journalists, civil-society organizations, and academic observers, who contended that executive discretion encouraged clientelism and limited pluralism. Analyses linked concession patterns to the consolidation of regional political machines and to the resilience of large private networks. Others noted that technical rationales and infrastructure goals were also invoked to justify allocations, and that post-1990 regulatory changes gradually tightened procedures. Assessments of Magalhães's role vary, but most place his tenure at the center of debates over the relationship between media structure and democratic consolidation in Brazil.

== Return to Bahia and national politics (1990s) ==
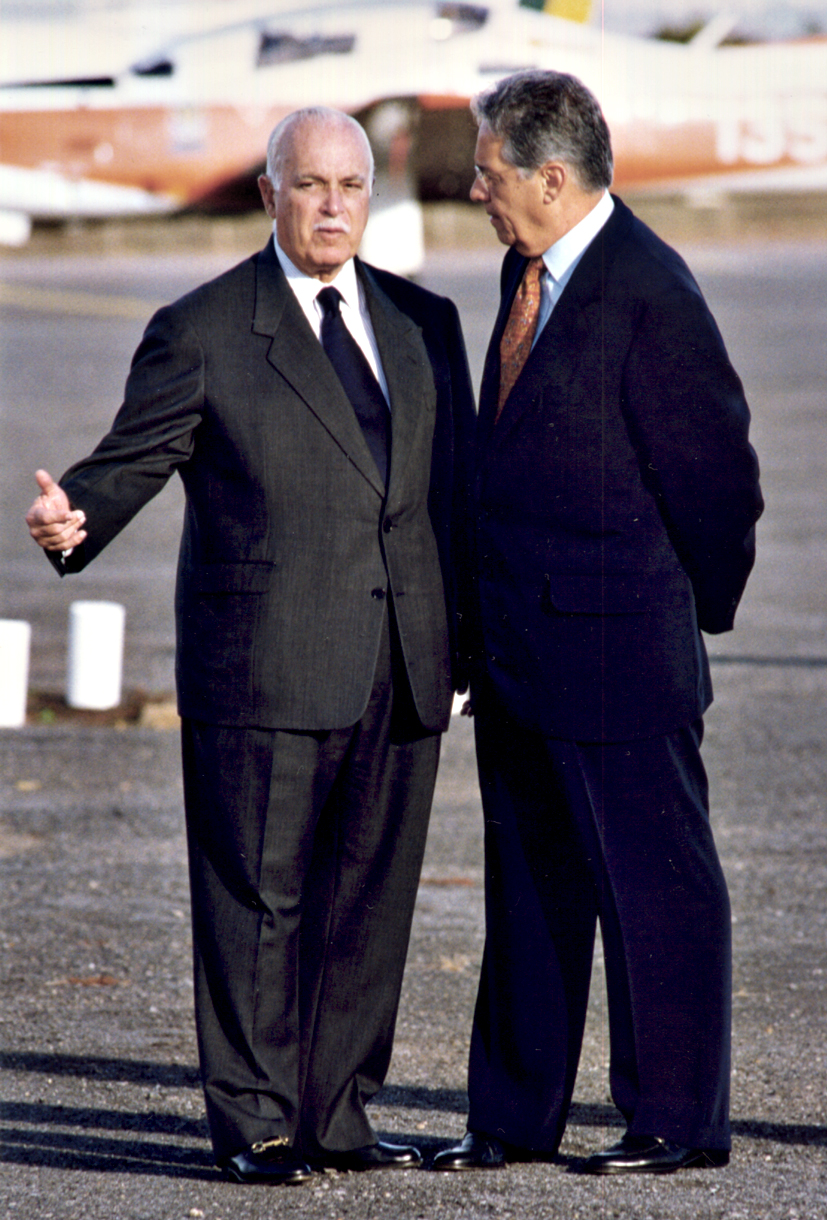
ACM with President Fernando Henrique Cardoso in 1998 in Brasília.

=== Third governorship (1991–1994) ===
Magalhães returned to the governorship after winning the 1990 state election in the first round and took office on 15 March 1991, with geologist Paulo Souto as vice governor. Analysts saw the victory as a reassertion of his statewide coalition following the turbulent late 1980s and as a key step in projecting influence back to the national arena during Brazil's democratic consolidation. Official electoral records and scholarly overviews corroborate the timeline and political context of his return to office.

==== Administrative agenda and political machine-building ====
Commentators describe the 1991–1994 term as a phase of administrative assertiveness centered on urban renewal, tourism, and heritage policy, with measures that linked cultural programming to economic development. One emblematic initiative was the restoration of the Pelourinho historic quarter in Salvador, whose first major stages began in 1992 and 1993. Studies credit the works with catalyzing tourism and commercial activity, while documenting significant displacement of low-income residents and the reconfiguration of Afro-Bahian cultural spaces.

Cultural policy during the term was reorganized to prioritize tourism-oriented initiatives. Scholarship notes that the state government restructured the cultural portfolio at the start of the administration and subordinated many activities to economic and promotional objectives, anticipating later institutional arrangements under successor governments.

Political scientists interpret the period as one of maturation for carlismo, with administrative capacity, patronage, and media leverage reinforcing a dominant coalition while the economy of Salvador shifted toward services and cultural consumption.

==== Relations with the federal regime and opponents ====
At the outset of the term Magalhães aligned with President Fernando Collor, then navigated a recalibrated relationship with Brasília after Collor's 1992 impeachment and the transition to President Itamar Franco. Contemporary and retrospective accounts emphasize his ability to preserve federal-state channels and to convert state-level prominence into bargaining power in Congress.

Magalhães resigned on 12 April 1994 to run for the Federal Senate. The president of the Bahia Court of Justice, Ruy Trindade, served briefly as acting governor, and later that year the president of the state assembly, Antônio Imbassahy, was selected to complete the term, preceding Paulo Souto's election as governor in the October 1994 contest. State institutional biographies and national media accounts document the interim arrangements and succession.

=== Election to the Senate (1994) ===
ACM won a six-year term and took office on 1 February 1995, joining the leadership of the Liberal Front Party in the upper chamber. Contemporary institutional records list him on key committees and note his prominence within the pro-government bloc.

On his birthday in 1997, he was noted for saying "Only those who don't know me yet don't love me."

=== President of the Federal Senate (1997–2001) ===
==== Coalition-building during the Cardoso governments ====
Magalhães was elected President of the Federal Senate on 4 February 1997. In that capacity he helped manage the chamber's agenda during President Fernando Henrique Cardoso's second half of the first term and the beginning of the second, when the government pursued market-oriented reforms and fiscal stabilization. National and international coverage at the time portrayed him as a central power broker whose support was important for assembling majorities on key votes.

==== Legislative priorities and influence ====
As presiding officer, Magalhães oversaw deliberations on constitutional and statutory measures associated with the federal government's reform package, including fiscal and administrative changes and sectoral legislation debated from 1997 onward. Commentators credited his command of procedure and coalition ties with facilitating the government's floor strategy, while critics argued that his style concentrated power in the Senate presidency.

== 2001 electronic voting scandal and resignation ==
=== Investigations, findings, and Senate proceedings ===
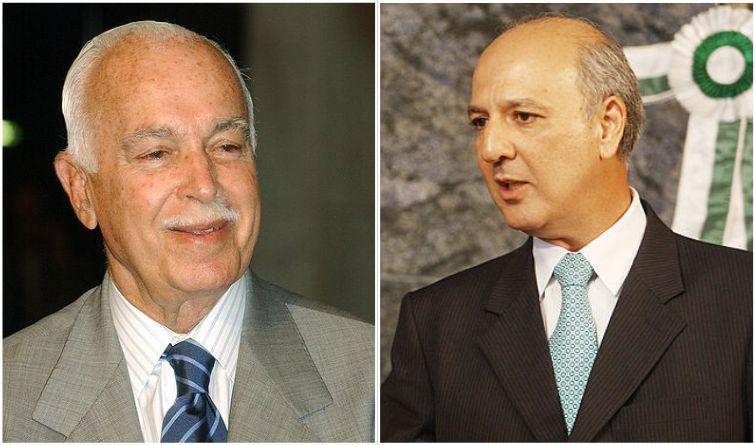
ACM and José Roberto Arruda

In February 2001 the Federal Senate opened an inquiry into allegations that the secrecy of its electronic voting system had been breached during the 28 June 2000 roll call that stripped Senator Luiz Estevão of his mandate. The investigation followed press reports and recordings indicating that a list revealing individual votes from the secret session was circulating among senior politicians. The Senate presidency sealed the voting panel control room and commissioned an independent forensic audit from the University of Campinas. When the results were presented to the plenary on 17 April 2001, the audit concluded that the system had been altered on the day of Estevão’s trial to preserve and print the otherwise ephemeral individual votes, and technicians described multiple vulnerabilities in the panel’s operation. Testimony from the Senate’s data-processing director, Regina Célia Peres Borges, implicated Senator José Roberto Arruda as the requester of the list and placed ACM as a beneficiary. Both senators initially denied wrongdoing, then acknowledged having received and read the list while disputing who ordered the breach.

The Council of Ethics held hearings through April and May and on 23 May 2001 approved a report recommending impeachment for breach of parliamentary decorum. Facing near-certain conviction and loss of political rights, Arruda resigned on 24 May and ACM resigned on 30 May 2001. Contemporary coverage in Brazil and abroad described the case as a grave institutional crisis for the chamber.

=== Immediate political aftermath ===
The resignations ended both senators’ terms but preserved their political rights, since Brazilian procedure allowed officeholders to step down before a final impeachment vote. ACM immediately began to rebuild his position in Bahia, where analysts observed that his regional network remained largely intact despite the national setback. The Senate elected new leadership and concluded the inquiry, while the Public Prosecutor pursued a criminal case at the Supreme Federal Tribunal. On 10 September 2003 the Court archived the charges against Magalhães, Arruda, and Borges on technical grounds. The justices held that the conduct did not meet the elements of then-applicable crimes related to suppression or destruction of a public document and that a newer provision that would have criminalized unauthorized modification of a computer system could not be applied retroactively. Commentators viewed the outcome as emblematic of the gap between technological change and criminal law, and as reinforcing public skepticism about accountability for high-ranking officials.

== Comeback, later career, and death (2002–2007) ==
=== Re-election to the Senate ===
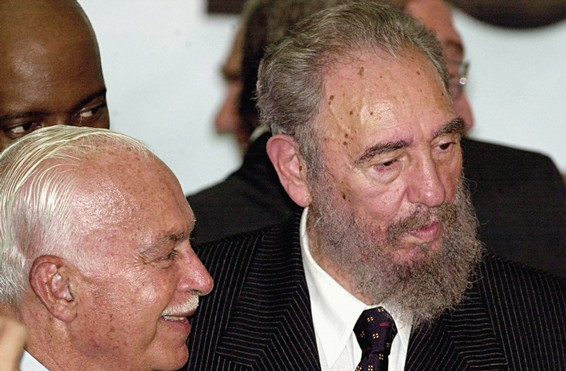
ACM with Fidel Castro in 2003.

Magalhães returned to electoral politics in 2002 and won another Senate seat for Bahia. He took office on 1 February 2003 and served until his death in July 2007. He was re-elected in 2002 and when in 2003 Luiz Inácio Lula da Silva of the left wing Workers' Party was elected president, Magalhães claimed that he came from "the Workers' Party wing of the Liberal Front Party" and was successful in having supporters appointed in Lula da Silva's administration. In January 2003, then Senator-elect Magalhães (PFL-BA) shook hands with Fidel Castro as Castro was leaving a luncheon given in Brasília in Castro's honor.

Later, on Castro's way to and from state visits to Africa, Castro would stop in Salvador da Bahia and spend a couple of days sharing stories with Magalhães. Through this, right-winged Magalhães and communist Fidel Castro developed a friendship to the dismay of Castro's left-wing admirers in Brazil.

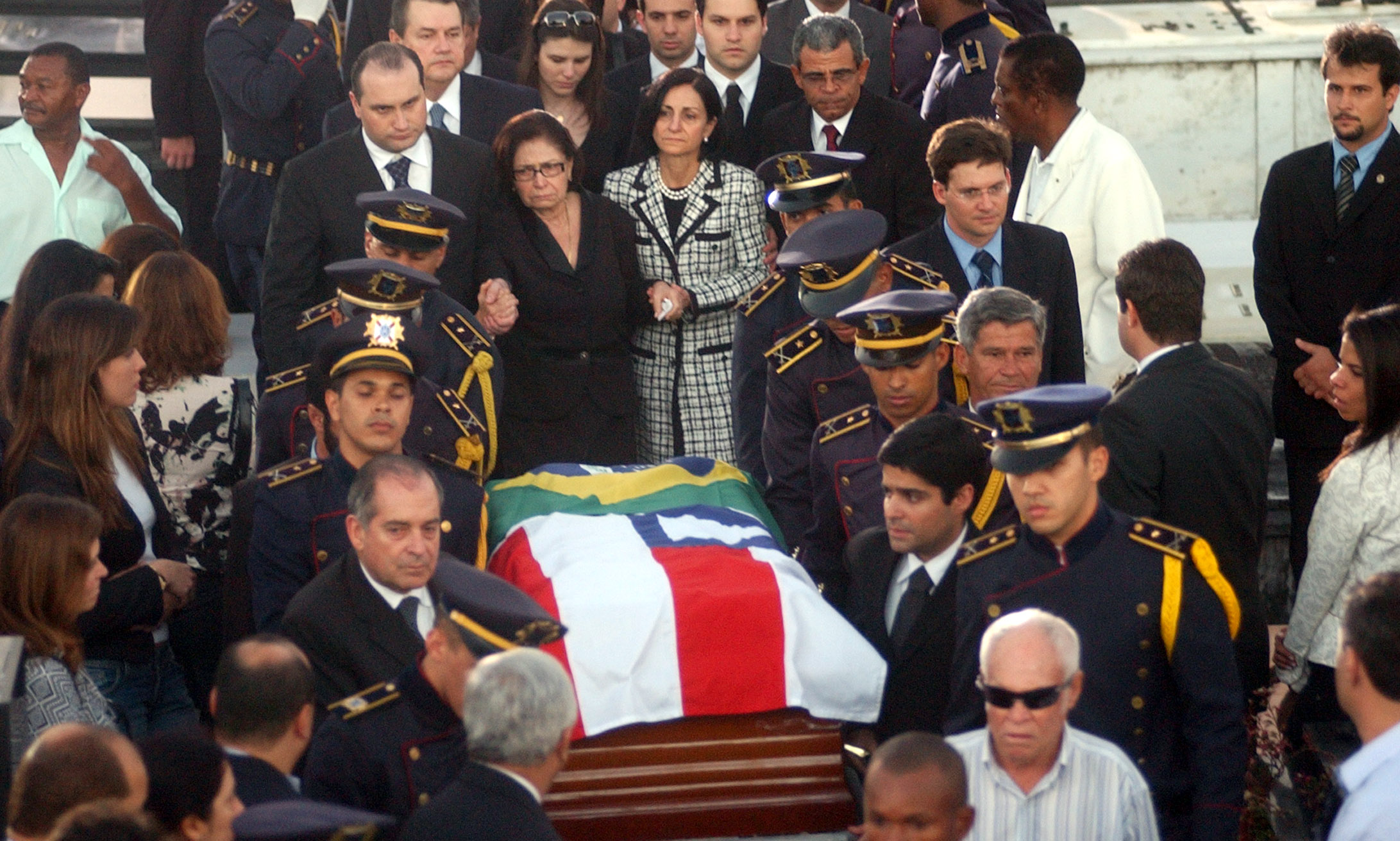
ACM's funeral in 2007.

Institutional profiles and national press accounts describe him as an active participant in negotiations during the early years of President Luiz Inácio Lula da Silva's administration, despite his opposition party affiliation.

=== Final years, illness, and death ===
In 2007 Magalhães was hospitalized in São Paulo, where he died on 20 July of multiple organ failure at the age of 79. He is buried at the Campo Santo Cemetery in Salvador, along with many other noted figures of the city. Obituaries highlighted his half-century in public life and recurring role as a conservative boss in the Northeast.

== Political positions and persona ==
=== Ideological profile and policy preferences ===
Analysts generally situate Magalhães on the conservative side of Brazil's post-1964 political spectrum, noting a law-and-order discourse and an emphasis on strong executive authority. Obituaries at the time of his death repeatedly portrayed him as a hard-nosed broker who moved easily between authoritarian and democratic contexts while retaining a conservative profile within national coalitions.

In Bahia, scholars describe his governing style as a program of "conservative modernization," combining high-visibility infrastructure and urban redevelopment with promotion of industry and services. Studies of Salvador's urban policy trace a long arc from his late-1960s mayoralty through his gubernatorial terms, linking coastal re-urbanization and historic-center renewal to a broader strategy of projecting technocratic efficacy and order, often amid conflicts with low-income residents and community organizations.

At the federal level, his tenure as Minister of Communications aligned modernization rhetoric with expansion of broadcast infrastructure and the discretionary distribution of radio and television concessions during the transition from military rule. Academic accounts argue that the policy mix expanded coverage and networks while entrenching oligopolistic structures and reciprocal ties between politicians and media owners; the ministry defended the allocations as part of sectoral development and democratization of access.

In the 1990s he supported market-oriented reforms advanced by President Fernando Henrique Cardoso while maintaining a pragmatic, state-led development stance in Bahia, a dual orientation that scholars identify as typical of state-level bosses adapting to national liberalization.

==== Carlismo in practice ====
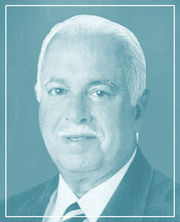
A photo produced by the Federal Senate posthumously.

Political scientists use the term carlismo to describe a subnational machine built around Magalhães that intertwined public administration, party organization, business elites, and local media. Comparative work on Brazilian state politics portrays Bahia under his leadership as a durable "authoritarian enclave" within a national democratic framework, where control of appointments, public works, and advertising budgets reinforced loyalty across municipal and state levels.

Control over media was a recurrent element in this machine politics. Studies of press and broadcasting in Bahia and at the federal level document how official advertising, regulatory pressure, and the award of broadcast concessions structured incentives for political alignment, particularly during the 1980s and early 1990s. These accounts emphasize the overlap between political elites and regional media markets in the Northeast and argue that licensing served legislative coalition-building during the Constituent Assembly years.

Scholars also stress how carlismo adapted over time. Quantitative and comparative analyses find that dominant state machines, including Bahia's, lost electoral hegemony as party systems fragmented, federal social policies expanded, and civil society mobilized, even though legacies of clientelism and media concentration continued to shape competition. In this view, Magalhães's machine exemplified a resilient but ultimately eroding model of subnational bossism under Brazil's multiparty federalism.

=== Notable relationships and protégés ===
Commentators identify a cohort of allies who advanced within Bahian politics under Magalhães's leadership, including Paulo Souto and Antônio Imbassahy, both of whom later served as governor or mayor after holding senior positions in his administrations. Scholars treat the promotion of such figures as a characteristic feature of carlismo, in which appointments and campaign support knitted together a statewide coalition that outlived individual mandates.

=== Media and business interests ===
==== Links to media markets ====
Researchers link Magalhães's political network to Bahia's media landscape, noting the overlap between regional broadcasters, newspapers, and local political elites. Studies of media politics in Brazil describe how state-level leaders cultivated ties with owners of television and radio outlets, including affiliates of national networks, and used official advertising and access to state resources to shape coverage and consolidate coalitions.

Accounts of Bahia in the 1970s–1990s emphasize the durability of this nexus, especially during moments of electoral realignment when media endorsements and editorial lines intersected with local machine politics.

==== Legacy ====
As Minister of Communications (1985–1990), Magalhães oversaw a period of rapid sectoral growth. Academic analyses document a surge in the number of radio and television concessions granted under discretionary rules then in force, including allocations to legislators and political allies during the 1987–1988 Constituent Assembly. Critics characterize the pattern as regulatory capture that reinforced oligopolistic structures and deepened ties between political machines and regional media markets. In defense, ministry narratives and some contemporaneous accounts framed the expansion as an effort to modernize infrastructure and extend access beyond metropolitan centers.

== Reception and historical assessments ==
=== Scholarly perspectives ===
Political scientists frequently use Magalhães’s career to examine how dominant state machines persisted after Brazil’s transition to competitive politics. Comparative work on Bahia describes a durable configuration that combined administrative capacity, patronage, and control over strategic sectors such as communications to maintain statewide hegemony during the 1970s and 1980s, then adapted to multiparty competition in the 1990s. Studies of Brazilian state politics characterize this trajectory as a case of gradual erosion rather than abrupt collapse, with machine vote shares declining as party systems fragmented, federal social policy expanded, and civil society mobilized, even as legacies of clientelism and media concentration continued to shape local competition.

Scholars analyzing the internal mechanics of this dominance employ the notion of “subnational authoritarian enclaves,” arguing that Bahia under Magalhães displayed insulating strategies that parochialized power within provincial institutions, extended influence to national arenas, and monopolized links to federal resources.

Another strand of scholarship frames carlismo as a project of conservative modernization. Rather than a simple survival of First Republic coronelismo, authors such as Paulo Fábio Dantas Neto contend that Magalhães’s machine fused a technocratic, developmentalist orientation with a hierarchical, anti-pluralist practice, subordinating older oligarchies to a state-led agenda of industrial promotion and urban transformation. In this reading, the machine relied on governismo by municipal elites, selective co-optation of rivals, and the cultivation of a regional identity that linked cultural symbols to administrative performance. The resulting coalition proved resilient through Brazil’s re-democratization, then weakened as national and state-level alignments shifted after 2002.

Analysts also underscore the role of media as an organizational pillar. Accounts of “electronic coronelismo” describe how licensing policy, official advertising, and ownership concentration expanded broadcasting infrastructure while reinforcing political leverage in regional markets, especially during the 1980s and early 1990s.

Some authors argue that the informational power of television and radio substituted for older forms of coercion associated with rural bossism.

=== Press characterizations ===
Contemporary profiles and obituaries largely agreed on Magalhães’s national significance while dividing on his methods. International outlets portrayed him as a formidable broker who linked Bahian and federal arenas through forceful leadership, administrative showmanship, and strategic alliances, while critics emphasized confrontational tactics and machine-style patronage. Press narratives often highlighted emblematic public works in Salvador and debated the social costs of redevelopment, and they returned to the theme of political resilience following scandal and resignation in 2001.

=== Comparative perspective within Brazilian regional “bossism” ===
Histories of Brazilian politics place Magalhães within a longer lineage of regional bossism that scholars trace to coronelismo in the Old Republic. Although the institutional environment changed markedly after 1985, researchers argue that Bahia under Magalhães exemplified the reconfiguration of traditional practices through modern party alliances, media strategy, and discretionary control over state budgets. The result, in comparative perspective, was a modernized form of subnational leadership that both resembled and departed from earlier oligarchic patterns, persisting for decades and then receding as national and state-level competition intensified.

== Personal life ==
ACM married Arlette Maron in 1952. Obituaries list three children, including federal deputy Luiz Eduardo Magalhães, who died in 1998, and ACM Junior who succeeded him and note that members of the family remained active in politics in subsequent decades.

ACM's grandson Antônio Carlos Magalhães Neto, widely known as ACM Neto, was Mayor of Salvador from 2013 to 2021 and unsuccessfully ran for governor of Bahia in 2022.

ACM maintained a long association with Salvador's civic institutions through patronage and cultural sponsorship linked to state programs, although accounts differ on the extent to which such activities were politically instrumental.

== Electoral performance ==
Year	Election	Position	Party	Coalition	Partners	Party	Votes	Percent	Result	Ref.
1990	State Elections of Bahia	Governor	PFL	Let's Save Bahia (PFL, PDS, PTB, PL, PDC, PST)	Paulo Souto	PFL	1,642,726	50.71%		
1994	State Elections of Bahia	Senator	PFL	Will of the People (PFL, PPR, PTB, PP, PL, PSC)	ACM Jr.	PFL	1,926,557	37.36%		
1994	State Elections of Bahia	Senator	PFL	Will of the People (PFL, PPR, PTB, PP, PL, PSC)	Hélio Correia de Mello	PFL	1,926,557	37.36%		
2002	State Elections of Bahia	Senator	PFL	Action, Competence, Morality (PFL, PL, PPB, PTB, PSL, PTN, PST, PHS)	ACM Jr.	PFL	2,995,559	30.59%		
2002	State Elections of Bahia	Senator	PFL	Action, Competence, Morality (PFL, PL, PPB, PTB, PSL, PTN, PST, PHS)	Hélio Correia de Mello	PFL	2,995,559	30.59%		

== See also ==
- List of mayors of Salvador, Bahia
- List of governors of Bahia
- Beyond Citizen Kane

Political offices
Preceded by Julival Pires Rebouças	Mayor of Salvador; 1967–70	Succeeded by Clériston Andrade
Preceded by Luiz Viana Filho	Governor of Bahia; 1971–75; 1979–83; 1991–94	Succeeded by Roberto Santos
Preceded by Roberto Santos	Governor of Bahia; 1971–75; 1979–83; 1991–94	Succeeded by João Durval Carneiro
Preceded by Nilo Moraes Coelho	Governor of Bahia; 1971–75; 1979–83; 1991–94	Succeeded by Ruy Trindade
Preceded by Haroldo Corrêa de Mattos	Minister of Communications; 1985–90	Succeeded by Clériston Andrade
Preceded by José Sarney	President of the Federal Senate; 1997–2001	Succeeded by Jader Barbalho
