= HBA =

HBA or hba may refer to:

== Organizations ==
- Hawaii Baptist Academy, United States, a private Christian school
- Healthcare Businesswomen's Association, promotes involvement of women in healthcare
- Hewa Bora Airways, defunct airline of DR Congo
- Hospital Broadcasting Association, supports hospital radio in the United Kingdom
- Home Builders Association, a local association federated in National Association of Home Builders, a trade association in the United States

== Science and technology ==
- Hemoglobin A (HbA)
- Host bus adapter, computer network hardware
- Horse blood agar, an agar plate
- Human Biology Association

== Other uses ==
- Hamba language (ISO 639-3 code hba)
- Highway Beautification Act
- Hobart Airport (IATA code), Tasmania, Australia
- Honours degrees in Canada: Honors Bachelor of Arts, or Honors Business Administration
- Hood By Air, fashion brand
- "HBA" (song)
