= Siren Interactive =

Advertising agency in Chicago

- Type: Private company
- Industry: Advertising; Marketing
- Founded: 1999
- Founder: Winifred (Wendy) White
- Headquarters: Chicago
- Services: Relationship marketing

Siren Interactive is an agency specializing in relationship marketing for rare disorder therapies. Located in downtown Chicago, the company was started in 1999 and is a private, woman-owned business. In 2010, Siren Interactive made the fourth annual Inc. 5000, an exclusive ranking by Inc. magazine of the nation's fastest-growing private companies in the U.S.

== Overview ==
Siren collaborates with pharmaceutical companies who manufacturer rare disorder therapies on: web program planning, audience research insights, search engine marketing, medical content development, interactive web and email design and development, social media and CRM strategy, online/offline marketing integration, database management and online metrics analysis.

In the United States, the Rare Diseases Act of 2002 defines rare disease according to prevalence, specifically "any disease or condition that affects less than 200,000 persons in the United States.”

== Leadership ==
Siren’s founder and president, Winifred (Wendy) White, is on the board of directors of the National Organization for Rare Disorders (NORD), an American nonprofit working to provide support individuals with rare diseases by advocating and funding research, education, and networking among service providers. She is also on the board of directors of the Healthcare Businesswomen's Association, a nonprofit organization with more than 5,200 members across 14 chapters in the US and Europe.
