= List of mayors of Salvador, Bahia =

The following is a list of mayors of the city of Salvador, Bahia state, Brazil.

Number	Name	Image	Party	Start of term	End of term	Notes
1	José Luís de Almeida Couto		PL	April 1893	October 1895	
2	João Agripino Dória		PRFB	October 1895	November 1895	
3	Eduardo Freire		PMB	November 1895	July 1896	
4	Afonso Glicério Maciel		PRP	October 1896	November 1896	
5	Francisco de Paula Guimarães		PRFB	December 1896	April 1897	
6	Manuel de Sousa		PP	April 1897	December 1897	
—	Francisco de Paula Guimarães		PRFB	December 1897	March 1898	
—	Manuel de Sousa		PP	May 1898	December 1898	
—	Francisco de Paula Guimarães		PRFB	January 1899	April 1899	
7	Antônio Victório de Araújo Falcão		PRP	April 1899	December 1899	
8	José Eduardo Freire de Carvalho Filho		PSN	January 1900	December 1903	
9	Antônio de Araújo Falcão		PMB	January 1904	17 December 1905	
10	Alfredo Ferreira de Barros		PSN	17 December 1905	25 December 1905	
11	Leopoldino Antônio de Freitas Tantú		PRC	25 December 1905	March 1906	
12	Antônio Victório de Araújo Falcão		PRC	April 1906	December 1907	
13	Antônio Carneiro da Rocha		PRC	January 1908	February 1912	
14	Júlio Viveiros Brandão		PRD	February 1912	December 1912	
15	João Gonçalves da Cruz		PRC	January 1913	June 1913	
—	Júlio Viveiros Brandão		PRD	June 1913	September 1914	
16	João de Azevedo Fernandes		PRC	September 1914	August 1915	
17	Antônio Pacheco Mendes		PRD	December 1915	April 1917	
18	João Propício Carneiro		PRD	August 1917	August 1918	
19	José da Rocha Leal		PL	March 1918	March 1920	
20	Manuel Duarte de Oliveira		PL	March 1920	May 1921	
21	Epaminondas Torres		PRD	May 1921	June 1924	
22	Joaquim Wanderley de Araújo Pinho		CRB	June 1924	July 1926	
23	Francisco Elói Paraíso Jorge		CRB	August 1926	December 1927	
24	Francisco Gomes Magarão Ribeiro		PRB	1 January 1928	10 January 1928	
25	Mário Afrânio Peixoto		PRB	10 January 1928	March 1928	
26	Francisco de Sousa		PRB	March 1928	18 October 1930	
27	Mário Afrânio Peixoto		PRB	18 October 1930	24 October 1930	
28	Tirso Simões de Paiva		PRB	6 November 1930	24 December 1930	
29	Leopoldo Amaral		AL	25 December 1930	31 December 1930	
30	Tirso Simões de Paiva		PP	1 January 1931	17 February 1931	
31	Arnaldo Pimenta da Cunha		AL	17 February 1931	July 1932	
32	Tirso Simões de Paiva		AL	August 1931	September 1931	
33	Aurélio Brito de Menezes		AL	July 1932	November 1932	
34	José Americano da Costa		AL	December 1932	September 1937	
35	Antônio Bezerra Rodrigues Lopes		AL	7 October 1937	10 November 1937	
36	Severino Prestes Filho		AL	10 November 1937	March 1938	
37	Durval Neves da Rocha		PP	April 1938	November 1942	
38	Elísio Lisboa		AL	December 1942	April 1945	
39	Aristides Milton da Silveira		PSD	May 1945	November 1945	
40	Adalício Coelho Nogueira		—	November 1945	February 1946	
41	Armando Carneiro da Rocha		PSD	February 1946	July 1946	
42	Helenauro Sampaio		PSD	July 1946	April 1947	
43	José Wanderley Pinho		UDN	May 1947	January 1951	
44	Osvaldo Veloso Gordilho		PSD	February 1951	January 1954	
45	Aristóteles Góes		PR	January 1954	March 1955	
46	Aloísio Brasil Ribeiro		PP	March 1955	April 1955	
47	Hélio Ferreira		PDC	April 1955	January 1959	
48	Gustavo Gomes da Fonseca		PTN	21 February 1959	4 March 1959	
49	Heitor Dias		UDN	April 1959	April 1963	
50	Virgildásio de Senna		PTB	April 1963	April 1964	
51	Antonino Cazaes		ARENA	6 April 1964	24 April 1964	
52	Nelson de Sousa		ARENA	24 April 1964	1 February 1967	
53	Julival Pires Rebouças		ARENA	1 February 1967	12 February 1967	
54	Antônio Carlos Magalhães		ARENA	February 1967	April 1970	
55	Clériston Andrade		ARENA	April 1970	March 1975	
56	Jorge Hage		ARENA	March 1975	29 March 1977	
57	Raimundo Urbano		MDB	29 March 1977	1 April 1977	
58	Fernando Magalhães		ARENA	1 April 1977	15 August 1978	
59	David Mendes Pereira		ARENA	15 August 1978	18 August 1978	
60	Edvaldo Brito		ARENA	18 August 1978	March 1979	
61	Mário Kertész		ARENA	March 1979	November 1981	
62	Renan Baleeiro		PDS	November 1981	February 1983	
63	Manoel Castro		PDS	February 1983	31 December 1985	
64	Mário Kertész		PMDB	1 January 1986	31 December 1988	elected
65	Fernando José Rocha		PMDB	1 January 1989	31 December 1992	elected
66	Lídice da Mata		PSDB	1 January 1993	31 December 1996	elected
67	Antônio Imbassahy		PFL	1 January 1997	31 December 2004	
68	João Henrique Carneiro		PDT	1 January 2005	31 December 2012	
69	Antônio Carlos Magalhães Neto		DEM	1 January 2013	1 January 2021	
70	Bruno Reis		UB	1 January 2021	Present	

== See also ==
- Câmara Municipal de Salvador
- Timeline of Salvador, Bahia
- List of governors of Bahia
- List of representatives of Bahia
- List of mayors of largest cities in Brazil (in Portuguese)
- List of mayors of capitals of Brazil (in Portuguese)
