= Olívia Santana =

Brazilian politician and activist

Olivia Santana
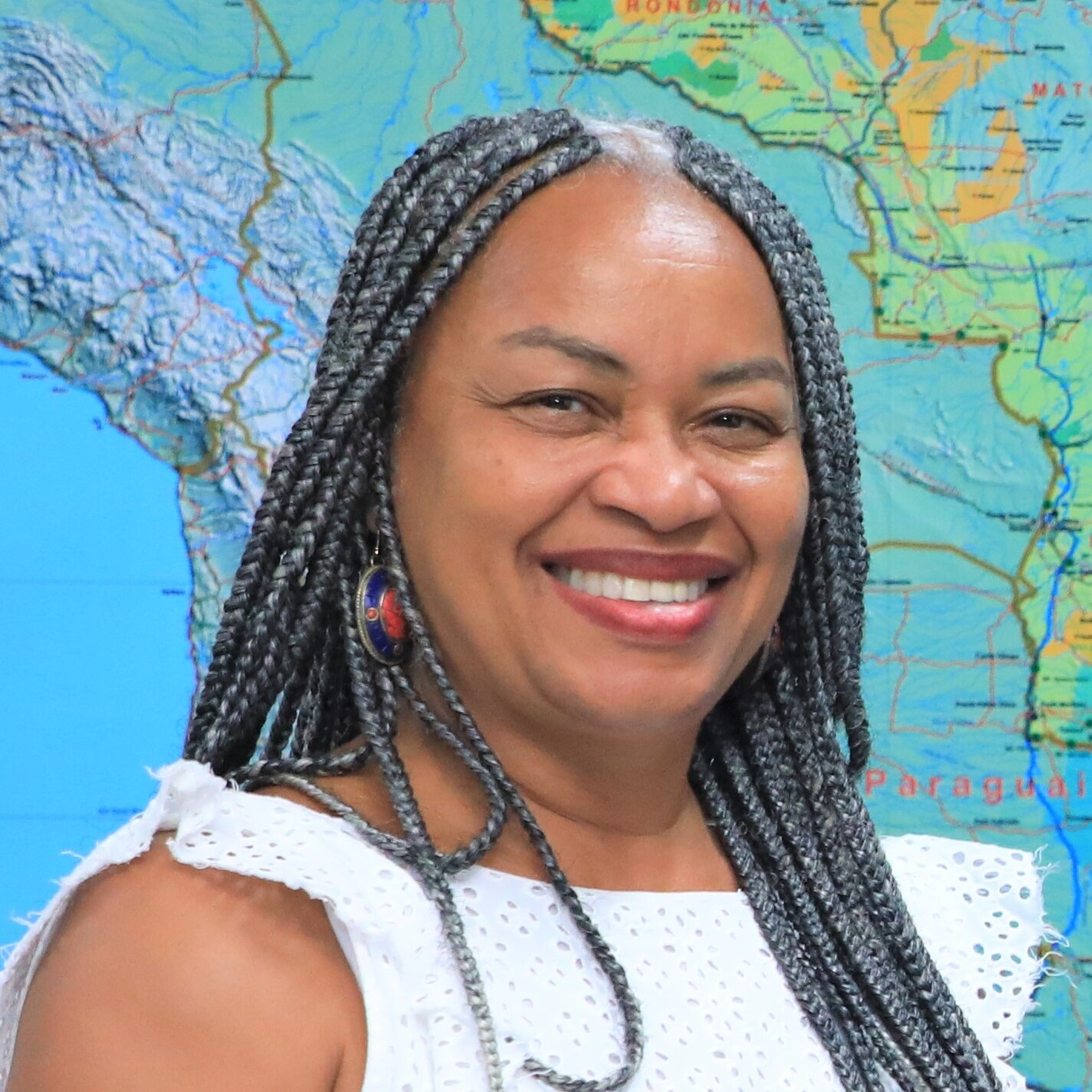

Member-elect of the Chamber of Deputies
- Assuming office 1 February 2027
- Constituency: Bahia

Member of the Legislative Assembly of Bahia
- Incumbent
- Assumed office 1 February 2019
- Constituency: At-large

Member of the Municipal Chamber of Salvador
- In office 1 January 2005 – 1 January 2013
- Constituency: At-large

Personal details
- Born: Maria Olivia Santana; 25 March 1967 (age 59) Salvador, Bahia, Brazil
- Party: PCdoB (1985–present)
- Education: Federal University of Bahia
- Profession: Teacher

Maria Olivia Santana is a Brazilian politician, activist, and teacher. From 2005 until 2012, she was a city councilor in the city of Salvador, Bahia. From 2015 until 2017, she was the Secretary of Policies for Women in the state of Bahia. From 2017 to 2018, she worked as the State Secretary for Employment, Labour, and Sports of Bahia. In 2019 she became a state representative in the Legislative Assembly of Bahia. She was the first black woman elected as a state legislator in Bahia.

== Life and career ==
Santana attended the Federal University of Bahia, where she graduated with a teaching degree.

Santana was elected as a city councilor in Salvador in 2005, and remained in that position until 2015. While Santana was a councilor in the city of Salvador, she authored a bill that resulted in the proclamation of a Municipal Day for Combating Religious Intolerance. This municipal legislation was the inspiration for a federal law that was passed in 2007, declaring a National Day to Combat Religious Intolerance. Santana also served as the Secretary of Education and Culture of Salvador.

In 2012, Santana ran to be the vice mayor of Salvador as the Communist Party of Brazil candidate, in a coalition nomination by 13 other leftist parties.

In the Rui Costa government, Santana served as Bahia's State Secretary of Policies for Women and then Secretary of State for Employment, Employment and Sports.

In 2018, Santana was elected as a representative to the state government of Bahia. This made her the first black woman elected as a state legislator in Bahia.
