= Ana Paula Matos =

Brazilian politician

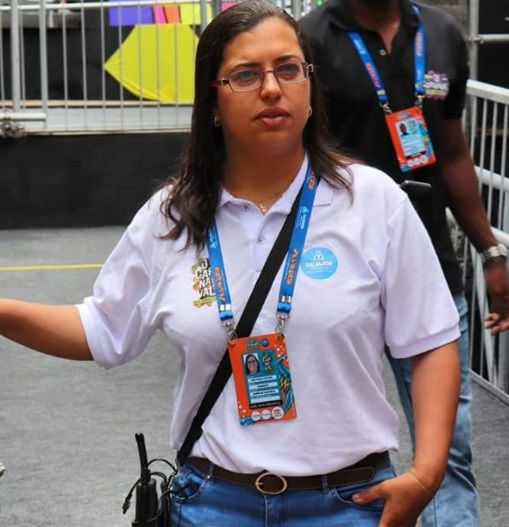
- Matos in February 2020

Vice Mayor of Salvador
- Incumbent
- Assumed office 1 January 2021
- Mayor: Bruno Soares Reis
- Preceded by: Bruno Soares Reis

Personal details
- Born: Ana Paula Andrade Matos Moreira; 1977 (age 48–49) Salvador, Bahia, Brazil
- Party: PDT (2020–present)
- Education: Salvador University (BBA); Catholic University of Salvador (LL.B.); Federal University of Bahia (MBA)

Ana Paula Andrade Matos Moreira is the current Vice Mayor of Salvador since 2021. She was the running-mate of Ciro Gomes in the 2022 Brazilian presidential election.

== Biography ==
Matos was born in Salvador, Bahia, Brazil. She was educated at Salvador University, Catholic University of Salvador and Federal University of Bahia, holding a BBA, MBA and LLB. She joined PDT in 2020.

She began her career in municipal government as the Director General of Education in 2013. She was also secretary of the Neighbourhood Prefectures and secretary of Social Promotion, Sports, and Combating Poverty.

She was an employee of Petrobras. She ran a ticket with Bruno Soares Reis for Mayor and Vice Mayor of Salvador. The ticket was victorious, and she became Vice Mayor of Salvador. In the 2022 Brazilian presidential election, she was the running mate of Ciro Gomes.

Political offices
Preceded by Bruno Reis	Vice Mayor of Salvador; 2021–present	Incumbent
Party political offices
Preceded by Kátia Abreu	Democratic Labour Party nominee for Vice President of Brazil; 2022	Most recent
