= Bruno Soares Reis =

Mayor of Salvador, Bahia, Brazil

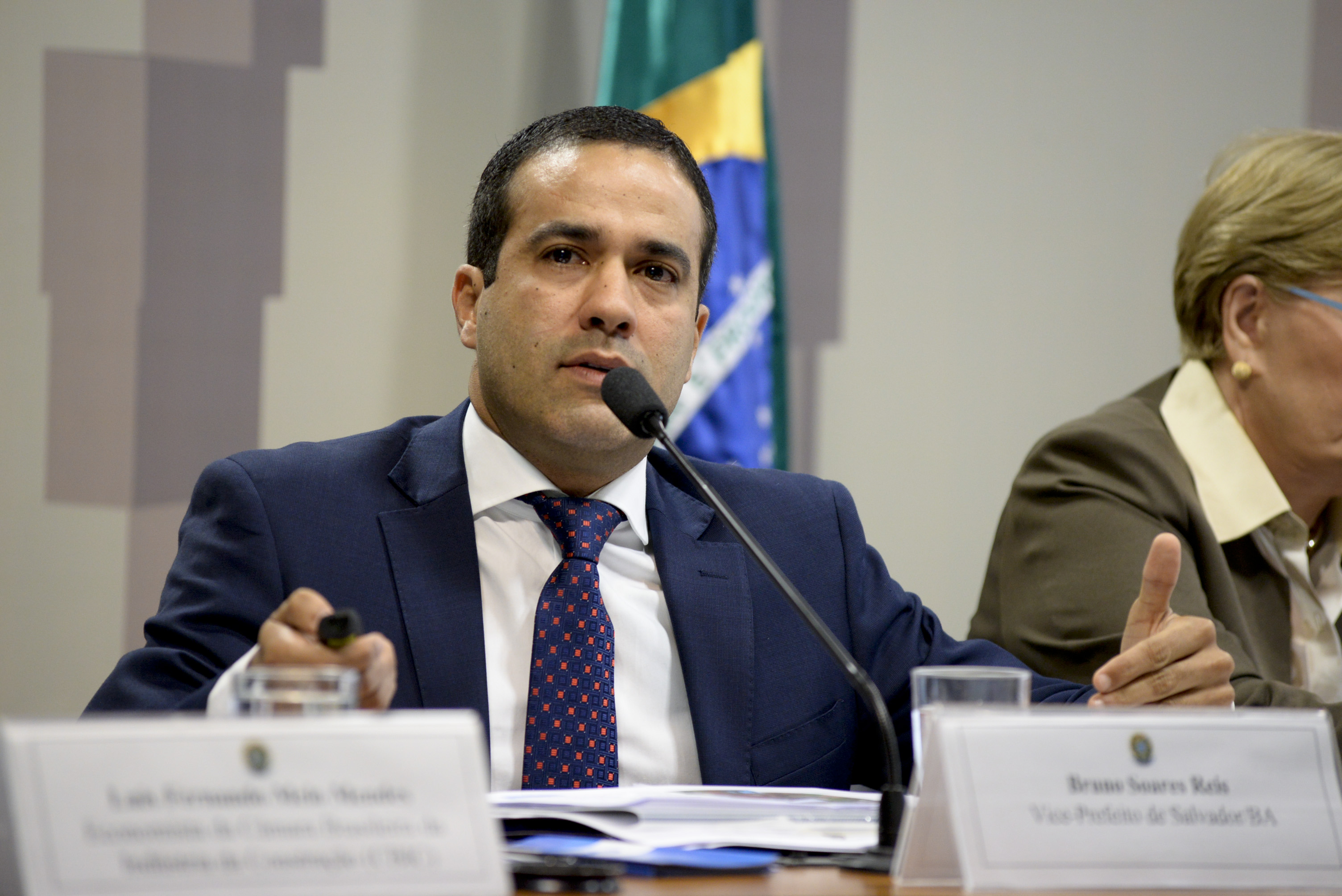

Mayor of Salvador
- Incumbent
- Assumed office 1 January 2021
- Vice-mayor: Ana Paula Matos
- Preceded by: ACM Neto

Vice-mayor of Salvador
- In office 1 January 2017 – 1 January 2021
- Preceded by: Célia Sacramento
- Succeeded by: Ana Paula Matos

State deputy for Bahia
- In office 1 February 2011 – 31 December 2016

Secretary for Social Promotion, Sport, and Combatting Poverty of Salvador
- In office 3 March 2015 – 1 June 2016

Personal details
- Born: Bruno Soares Reis; 17 May 1977 (age 49) Petrolina, Pernambuco, Brazil
- Party: PFL; PHS (2005–2009); PRP (2009–2013); PMDB (2013–2018); Democratas (2018–2022); UNIÃO (2022–present)
- Children: 3

Bruno Soares Reis (born May 17, 1977) is a Brazilian politician who is the 70th current mayor of Salvador, Bahia, having served since 2021. He was previously vice-mayor under ACM Neto, to whom he is a close associate of, from 2017 to 2021, and a state deputy in Bahia from 2011 to 2016. He is currently affiliated with União Brasil.

== Biography ==
Reis was born in Petrolina, Pernambuco, the son of João Batista Cavalcanti Reis and Márcia Beatriz Ribeiro Soares. He graduated with a law degree from the Catholic University of Salvador (UCSal), with further research in management at the Fundação Getulio Vargas, and a master's degree in Development and Social Management from the Federal University of Bahia (UFBA).

He became involved in politics starting in the 1990s when he became a trainee and eventually took up the position as assessor in the municipal assembly of Salvador. He did so while still at university. During this period, he became involved with the Young PFL branch in Bahia, where he met ACM Neto and became integrated into his political sphere. When ACM Neto became a federal deputy in 2002, Reis became his political advisor. In 2010, Reis was elected as a state deputy in Bahia, being reelected in 2014.

Reis was elected vice-mayor in 2016, with ACM Neto as mayor. In 2019, he became ACM Neto's secretary of Infrastructure and Public Works. He previously had been the secretary for Social Promotion, Sport, and Combatting Poverty. In 2020, he was elected in his own right as mayor of Salvador, running with PDT member Ana Paula Matos as vice-mayor. Their campaign ticket was the most voted among all mayoral races that year in terms of the proportional vote in the first round, with 64.20% of the vote. They won in a landslide against multiple challengers by a 40-point margin, with the second-place candidate from the Workers' Party, Denice Santiago, coming in second place with 18.86% of the vote, and Pastor Sargento Isidório of Avante, coming in third with 5.33% of the vote. He was reelected in 2024.

Political offices
Preceded by ACM Neto	Mayor of Salvador; 2021–present	Succeeded by Incumbent
