= Antônio Carlos Magalhães Neto =

Brazilian lawyer and politician

ACM Neto
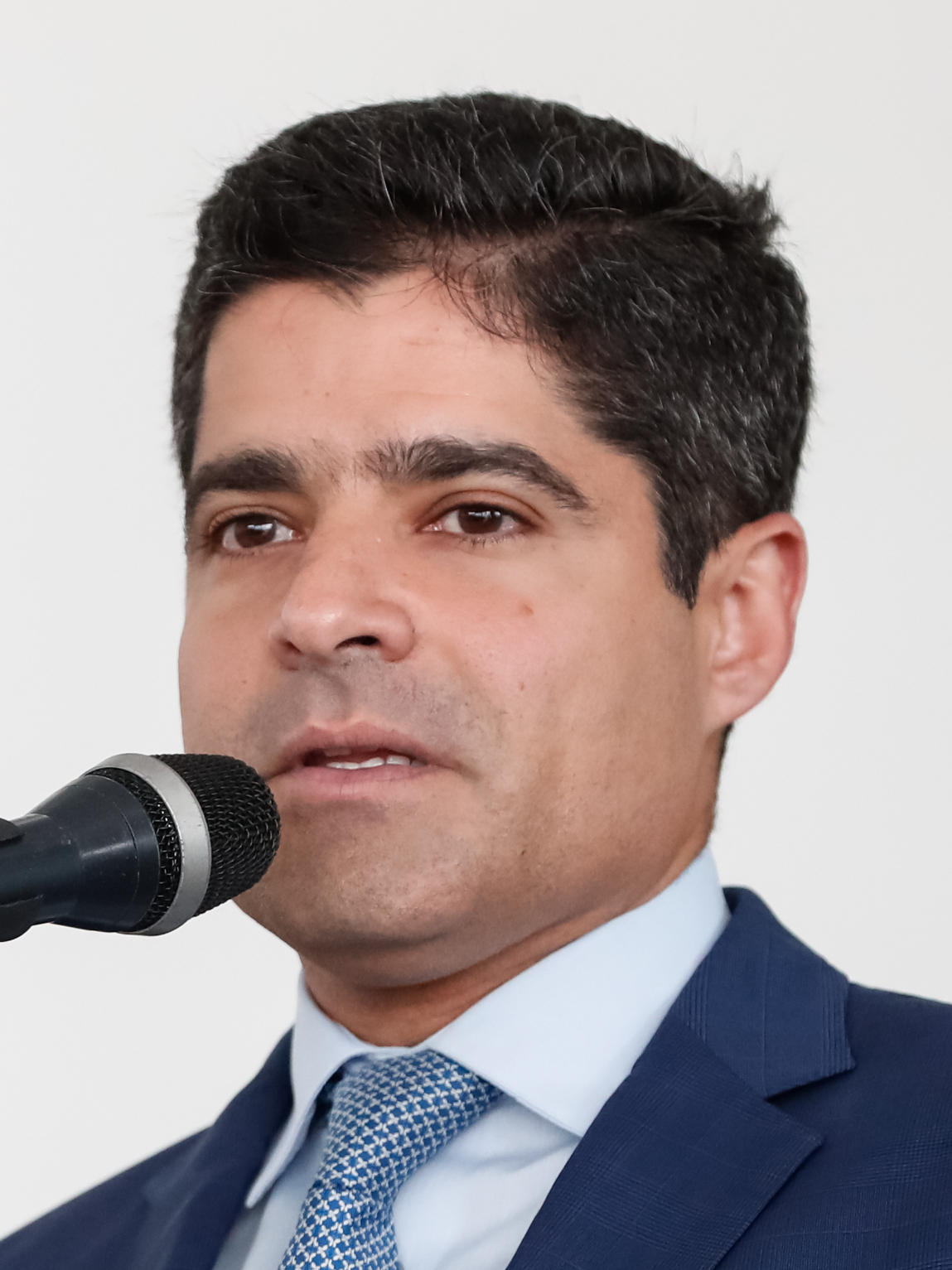
- Neto in 2019

Mayor of Salvador
- In office 1 January 2013 – 1 January 2021
- Vice Mayor: Célia Sacramento (2013–17); Bruno Reis (2017–21)
- Preceded by: João Henrique Carneiro
- Succeeded by: Bruno Reis

General Secretary of Brazil Union
- In office 6 October 2021 – 29 February 2024
- President: Luciano Bivar
- Preceded by: Position established
- Succeeded by: Davi Alcolumbre

National President of Democrats
- In office 8 March 2018 – 8 February 2022
- Preceded by: José Agripino Maia
- Succeeded by: Party merged

Federal Deputy from Bahia
- In office 1 February 2003 – 1 January 2013

Personal details
- Born: Antônio Carlos Peixoto de Magalhães Neto; 26 January 1979 (age 47) Salvador, Bahia, Brazil
- Party: UNIÃO (2022–present)
- Other political affiliations: PFL (2000–07); DEM (2007–22)
- Spouse: Lídia Salles (m. 2002; div. 2012)
- Domestic partner: Tatá Canhedo (2015–17)
- Children: Lívia (b. 2005); Marcela (b. 2009)
- Parents: Antônio Carlos Peixoto de Magalhães Júnior (father); Maria do Rosário Vianna (mother)
- Relatives: Antônio Carlos Magalhães (grandfather); Luís Eduardo Magalhães (uncle)
- Education: Federal University of Bahia (LL.B.)
- Profession: Lawyer
- Website: www.acmneto.com.br

Antônio Carlos Peixoto de Magalhães Neto, commonly known as ACM Neto, (born 26 January 1979 in Salvador) is a Brazilian lawyer and politician. He was the national president of the Democrats (DEM), and is currently general secretary of the Brazil Union. He is the grandson of deceased Senator and Governor of Bahia Antônio Carlos Magalhães (ACM), nephew of Luís Eduardo Magalhães and son of Antônio Carlos Magalhães Júnior, and political inheritor of one of the most powerful political families of the country. He was elected mayor of Salvador in 2012 and reelected in 2016. During both of his terms as mayor he was rated the most popular mayor in Brazil.

Neto ran in the 2022 Bahia gubernatorial election, but lost to Jerônimo, winning 47.21% of the vote.

== Early life ==
Neto was born in Salvador to Antônio Carlos Magalhães Júnior, son of ACM, the former governor of Bahia. He is also the nephew of Luís Eduardo Magalhães and great grandson of Francisco Peixoto de Magalhães Neto

He is a Lebanese descendant by his grandmother Arlette Maron, her family being one of the first Lebanese families to establish themselves in the south of Bahia, more precisely in the city of Itabuna.

Graduated in Law by the Federal University of Bahia, ACM Neto was involved in politics from a very young age, even being First Vice President of the student body of Colégio Módulo, where he concluded high school. He followed the political campaigns of his grandfather, Antônio Carlos Magalhães, and his uncle, Luís Eduardo Magalhães.

== Career ==
=== Federal deputy ===
After serving as an advisor of the State Secretary of Education of Bahia between 1999 and 2002, he was elected federal deputy, being the most voted candidate in the state by the PFL (then DEM); took office from 2003 to 2007. In this period, he was sought out by the media because of his participation in the Inquiry Mixed Parliamentary Committee (CPMI) of the Correios.

He was reelected as federal deputy in 2006.

In 2009, as "corregidor" of the Chamber of Deputies and member of the Ethic and Parliamentary Decorum Council, he asked for the repeal of the term of Edmar Moreira (Independent-MG), accused of using indemnity funds of the Chamber in benefit of his own companies. ACM Neto didn't vote for the repeal in the Council because he was the accuser, but his substitute, Roberto Magalhães (DEM-BA), voted for the repeal. ACM Neto criticized the decision of the council to acquit the deputy.

In 2010, he was reelected as federal deputy, being the most voted in Bahia and the 8th most voted in Brazil.

In 2011, he defended the proposal of the raising of the minimum wage to R$ 560.00 (US$ 336.00 per month). In the same year, he was nominated the 6th most influential parliamentary in Congress.

==== Assassination attempt ====
On 17 December 2006 in Salvador, ACM Neto was stabbed in his back by the pensioner Rita de Cássia Sampaio de Souza. After that, he was admitted to Bahia Hospital. His aggressor was arrested and indicted for attempted murder.

==== Airline ticket scandal ====
He was "corregidor" of the Federal Chamber in 2009 when the airline tickets scandal (also known as "airline tickets spree") blew up. He said to the column Painel of the Brazilian newspaper Folha de São Paulo that "[he] thought the press wanted to shut down the Congress" and that he could have used airline tickets bought with the Chamber funds to travel with his wife to Paris.

=== Mayor of Salvador ===
He was a candidate for mayor of Salvador in 2008, although he didn't make it through the second round. With 99% of the votes counted, he got 26% against around of 30% of his opponents. In the second round, he supported João Henrique Carneiro (PMDB).

In 2012, he was elected as Mayor of Salvador in the second round, with 53% of the votes, against 46% of his opponent, Nelson Pelegrino (PT).

In 2016, he was reelected Mayor of Salvador in the first round with 75% of the votes, against 15% of his opponent, Alice Portugal (PCdoB).

According to poll organization Vox Populi, ACM Neto was considered twice in a row (2013 and 2014) the best rated mayor in Brazil, with approval of 61% of Salvador, which gave him strength to run for a second term in 2016 and a possible term for governor or senator in 2018. In 2015, the good performance was repeated and overcame. According to Instituto Paraná, Neto has 84.7% of approval between the population of Salvador.

He was succeeded by his vice-mayor, Bruno Soares Reis.

=== 2022 Bahia election ===
In 2018, he became the national president of the Democrats (DEM) political party, substituting José Agripino Maia.

| Year | Election | Party | Office | Coalition | Partners | Party | Votes | % | Result | Ref. |
|---|---|---|---|---|---|---|---|---|---|---|
| 2002 | State Elections in Bahia | PFL | Federal Deputy | None | | | 400,273 | 6.72% | Elected | |
| 2006 | State Elections in Bahia | PFL | Federal Deputy | None | | | 436,967 | 6.65% | Elected | |
| 2008 | Salvador Mayoral Election | DEM | Mayor | Voice of the People DEM, PR, PRB, PRP, PSDC, PTdoB, PTC, and PTN | Márcio Marinho | PR | 346,881 | 26.68% | Lost | |
| 2010 | State Elections in Bahia | DEM | Federal Deputy | None | | | 328,450 | 4.91% | Elected | |
| 2012 | Salvador Mayoral Election | DEM | Mayor | It's Time to Defend Salvador DEM, PV, PSDB, PR, PSDC, PPS, and PTN | Célia Sacramento | PV | 518.976 | 40.71% | Second Round | |
| 2012 | Salvador Mayoral Election | DEM | Mayor | It's Time to Defend Salvador DEM, PV, PSDB, PR, PSDC, PPS, and PTN | Célia Sacramento | PV | 717,865 | 53.51% | Elected | |
| 2016 | Salvador Mayoral Election | DEM | Mayor | Pride of Salvador DEM, MDB, PSDB, PV, PMB, PEN, PHS, PPS, PRB, PSC, PTdoB, PSDC, PTB, SD, and PTC | Bruno Reis | PMDB | 982,246 | 73.99% | Elected | |
| 2022 | State Elections in Bahia | UNIÃO | Governor | To Change Bahia UNIÃO, REP, PP, Fed. PSDB/CID, PDT, PSC, PTB, PODE, SD, PRTB, DC, and PMN | Ana Coelho | REP | 3,316,711 | 40.80% | Second Round | |
| 2022 | State Elections in Bahia | UNIÃO | Governor | To Change Bahia UNIÃO, REP, PP, Fed. PSDB/CID, PDT, PSC, PTB, PODE, SD, PRTB, DC, and PMN | Ana Coelho | REP | 4,007,023 | 47.21% | Lost | |

== See also ==
- Antônio Carlos Magalhães
- List of mayors of Salvador, Bahia

Political offices
| Preceded by João Henrique Carneiro | Mayor of Salvador; 2013–2021 | Succeeded by Bruno Soares Reis |
Party political offices
| Preceded by José Agripino Maia | National President of Democrats; 2018–2022 | Party merged |
| New political party | General Secretary of Brazil Union; 2021–2024 | Succeeded by Davi Alcolumbre |
