= Rômulo Almeida =

Brazilian economist

- Born: August 18, 1914; Salvador, Bahia, Brazil
- Died: November 23, 1988 (aged 74); Belo Horizonte, Minas Gerais, Brazil
- Education: Federal University of Bahia

Rômulo Barreto de Almeida (August 18, 1914 – November 23, 1988) was a Brazilian economist, politician, and writer. An exponent of developmentalism, he helped coordinate the establishment of several state companies and banks, including Petrobras, Eletrobras, Sudene, and the Banco do Nordeste. He also served as a consultant to the Second National Plan of Development (pt), launched under the administration of Ernesto Geisel.

== Biography ==
=== Early years and formation ===
Born in Salvador, Almeida graduated from the Faculty of Law of Bahia in 1933. Beginning in his school years, he developed an interest in politics, influenced by his cousin Isaías Alves. Although initially disinclined, he joined the Brazilian Integralist Action in 1935. Settled in Rio de Janeiro, he wrote articles for A Offensiva, the movement's newspaper. Following the consolidation of the Estado Novo, Almeida, together with fellow activist Abdias do Nascimento, was arrested and subsequently forced to flee to Salvador.

=== Career (1941 - 1951) ===
In 1941, he was appointed by Mario Augusto de Teixeira Freitas as director of the Department of Geography and Statistics of the state of Acre. Between 1942 and 1943, he worked as a substitute lecturer of economy at the National Faculty of Economic Sciences of the University of Brazil. Following the fall of the Estado Novo, Almeida served as adviser to the Commission of Economic and Social Inquiry of the 1946 Constituent Assembly.

From 1948 to 1949, Almeida participated in the Abbink Mission, a joint Brazilian-American economic study commission headed by John Abbink and Otávio de Bulhões. In the early 1950s, he worked for the Confederação Nacional da Indústria and joined the Brazilian Labour Party, then led by Getúlio Vargas.

=== Second presidency of Getúlio Vargas (1951 - 1954) ===
During Vargas' term as a democratically elected president, Almeida integrated the Presidential Civil Cabinet and was assigned with organizing the Economic Advisory Office to the President. In 1951, he became a member of the executive board of Eletrobras Chesf, a post he occupied until 1966.

=== Fourth Republic and Military Dictatorship (1954 - 1985) ===
In October 1954, Almeida was elected a federal deputy for the Labour Party, but left office in April 1955 to become Secretary of Finance of the state of Bahia. That same year, he established and presided the Commission of Economic Planning, an executive organ tasked with carrying out large-scale surveys and studies.

In 1957, Almeida was appointed vice-president of RFFSA. The same year, he resumed his role as federal deputy for Bahia, holding the position until December. From 1957 to 1959, he helped restructure the Institute of Economy and Finances of Bahia and also served as a representative of his homestate of Bahia in the company Sudene.

Following the 1964 military coup, he joined the Brazilian Democratic Movement. In 1978, he ran for the Senate representing the state of Bahia, but was defeated by his ARENA rival Lomanto Júnior.

== Works ==
- A experiência brasileira de planejamento, orientação e controle da economia
- Educação num país em processo inicial de desenvolvimento
- Novas medidas internacionais em prol do desenvolvimento econômico
- Petroquímica na economia nacional
- O Nordeste no Segundo Governo Vargas
- Finanças estaduais e serviços fazendários
- Pastas Rosas
