= Nelson Pelegrino =

Brazilian politician (born 1960)

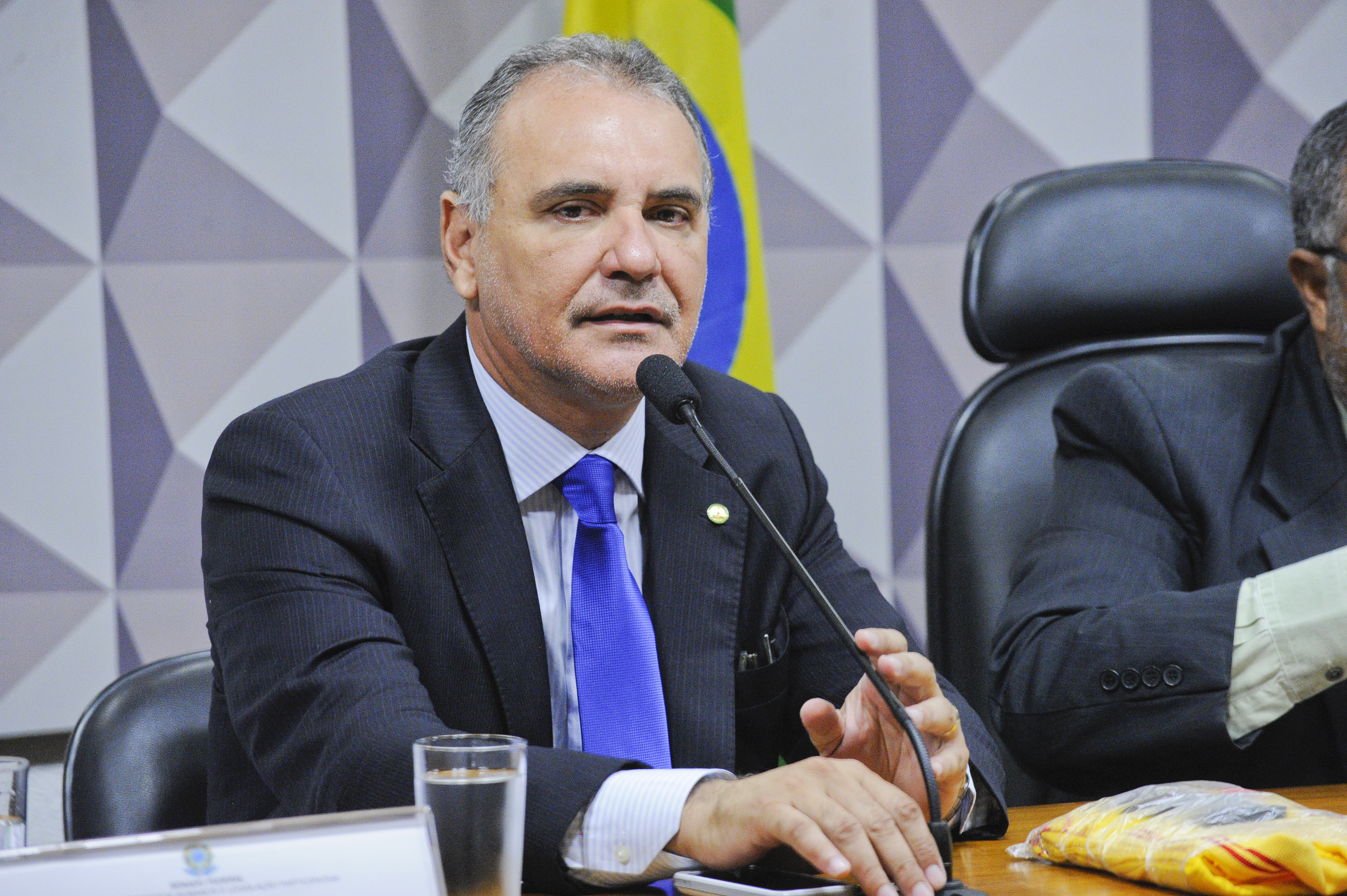
- Pelegrino in 2016

Member of the Chamber of Deputies
- In office 1 February 1999 – 16 September 2021
- Constituency: Bahia

Personal details
- Born: 27 February 1960 (age 66)
- Party: Workers' Party (1980–2021)

Nelson Vicente Portela Pelegrino (born 27 February 1960) is a Brazilian politician serving as a counsellor of the Court of Accounts of the Municipalities of Bahia since 2021. From 1999 to 2021, he was a member of the Chamber of Deputies.
