= Jornal A Tarde =

Newspaper in Brazil

A Tarde
- O jornal de toda Bahia
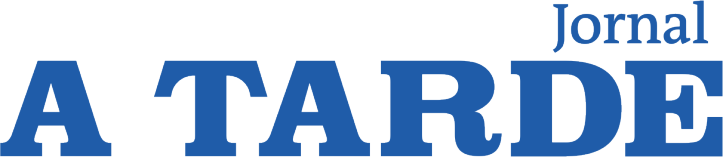
- Type: Daily newspaper
- Format: Broadsheet
- Owner: A TARDE group
- Founder: Ernesto Simões Filho
- Founded: October 15, 1912
- Language: Portuguese
- Headquarters: Professor Milton Cayres de Brito street, 204, Caminho das Árvores, in Salvador, Brazil
- City: Bahia
- Country: Brazil
- Website: atarde.uol.com.br

Jornal A Tarde, widely known as A Tarde, is a daily newspaper published in Bahia, Brazil. The paper was founded by the journalist and politician Ernesto Simões Filho on 15 October 1912. It is currently the oldest circulating newspaper of Bahia, and the largest of the Brazilian regions North and Northeast.

Its headquarters is located at the Professor Milton Cayres de Brito street, 204, Caminho das Árvores, in Salvador.
