= Lídice da Mata =

Brazilian economist and politician (born 1956)

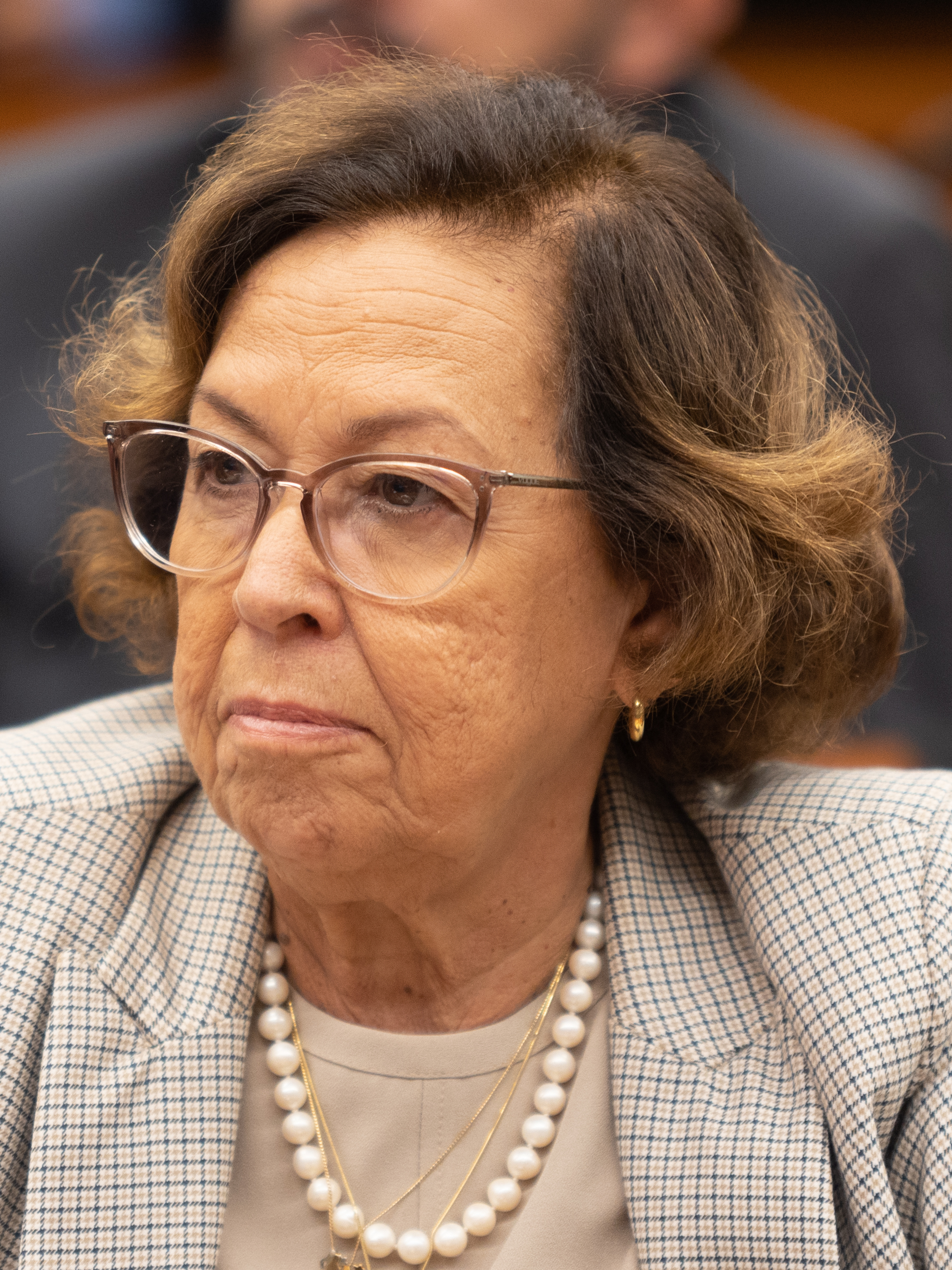

Member of the Chamber of Deputies
- Incumbent
- Assumed office 1 February 2019
- Constituency: Bahia
- In office 1 February 2007 – 1 February 2011
- Constituency: Bahia
- In office 1 February 1987 – 1 February 1991
- Constituency: Bahia

Senator for Bahia
- In office 1 February 2011 – 1 February 2019

Mayor of Salvador
- In office 1 January 1993 – 1 January 1997
- Vice Mayor: Beth Wagner
- Preceded by: Fernando José
- Succeeded by: Antônio Imbassahy

Member of the Legislative Assembly of Bahia
- In office 1 February 1999 – 1 February 2007
- Constituency: At-large

City Councillor of Salvador
- In office 1 January 1983 – 1 January 1987
- Constituency: At-large

Personal details
- Born: Lídice da Mata e Silva; 12 March 1956 (age 70) Cachoeira, Bahia, Brazil
- Party: PSB (since 1997)
- Other political affiliations: PMDB (1982–1986); PCdoB (1986–1992); PSDB (1992–1997)
- Education: Federal University of Bahia (BEc)
- Profession: Economist

Lídice da Mata e Souza (born 12 March 1956) is a Brazilian politician. She has represented Bahia in the Federal Senate from 2011 to 2019, when she returned to the Chamber. Previously she was a Federal Deputy from Bahia from 1987 to 1991 and from 2007 to 2011. She was mayor of Salvador, Bahia from 1993 to 1997. She is a member of the Brazilian Socialist Party.

== See also ==
- List of mayors of Salvador, Bahia
