= Healthcare Businesswomen's Association =

American non-profit organization

Healthcare Businesswomen's Association.
- Industry: Healthcare
- Founded: 1977; 49 years ago in New Jersey, U.S.
- Founders: Diane Anderson; Peg Dougherty; Millicent Gryczka; Sheila Sinkking; Ruth Smith, MD
- Headquarters: 373 Route 46 West Bldg E, Suite 215 Fairfield, NJ 07004, New Jersey, U.S.
- Key people: Mary Stutts (CEO)
- Website: https://www.hbanet.org/

The Healthcare Businesswomen's Association (HBA) was founded in 1977 as a global non-profit organization with the stated goal of furthering women involvement in healthcare worldwide.

It’s currently headquartered in New Jersey, United States, and as of 2021, it had 9,537 members worldwide.

== Organizational structure ==
The current CEO of the HBA is Mary Stutts.

== Press ==
The HBA has been featured on CIO.com, Associations Now magazine, BlogTalkRadio, and the PharmaVOICE Podcast.
