= Matheus de Geraldo Júnior =

Brazilian politician (born 1999)

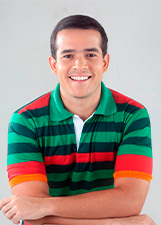

Member of the Legislative Assembly of Bahia
- Incumbent
- Assumed office 1 February 2023

Personal details
- Born: 27 January 1999 (age 27)
- Party: Brazilian Democratic Movement (since 2021)
- Parent: Geraldo Júnior (father)

Matheus de Oliveira Ferreira (born 27 January 1999), better known as Matheus de Geraldo Júnior, is a Brazilian politician serving as a member of the Legislative Assembly of Bahia since 2023. He is the son of Geraldo Júnior.
