= Geraldo Júnior =

Brazilian lawyer and politician

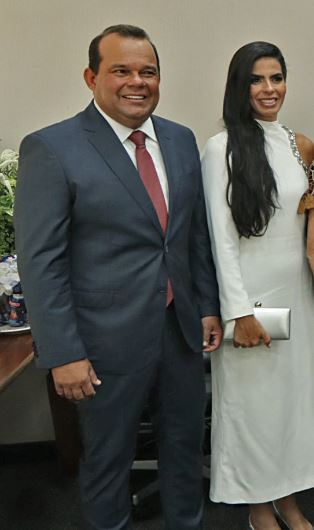

Vice-governor of Bahia
- Incumbent
- Assumed office 1 January 2023
- Governor: Jerônimo Rodrigues
- Preceded by: João Felipe de Souza Leão

Councilman of Salvador
- In office 1 January 2013 – 1 January 2023

Personal details
- Born: Geraldo Alves Ferreira Júnior; 7 May 1969 (age 57) Salvador, Bahia, Brazil
- Party: PTC (2001–2002); PRTB (2002–2007); PTN (2007–2013); Solidariedade (2013–2020); MDB (2020–present)
- Children: Matheus de Geraldo Júnior
- Occupation: Lawyer

Geraldo Alves Ferreira Júnior (born 7 May 1969) is a Brazilian lawyer and politician who has been the vice-governor of the state of Bahia since 2023. A member of the Brazilian Democratic Movement, he was previously a councilor for Salvador from 2013 to 2023. Geraldo Júnior and Jerônimo Rodrigues were elected in 2022 with 4,480,464 votes, or 52.79% percent of the vote.

His father, Geraldo Alves Ferreira, had also been a councilman in Salvador during the 1990s. Geraldo Júnior graduated with a law degree from the Catholic University of Salvador, as well as a post-graduate degree in civil processes. He had worked for the city of Salvador from 1993 to 2000. He later became the Municipal Secretary of Work, Sport and Leisure in 2017, and was seen as a confidante of then-mayor ACM Neto. He became a councilman in his own right in Salvador from 2013 to 2023, having also served as council president.

== Electoral history ==
Year	Election	Party	Position	Votes	%	Result	Ref
2008	Salvador municipal elections	PTN	Councilman			Not elected	
2012	Salvador municipal elections	PTN	Councilman	11,264	0.87%	Elected	
2016	Salvador municipal elections	Solidariedade	Councilman	13,685	1.08%	Elected	
2020	Salvador municipal elections	MDB	Councilman	12,906	1.07%	Elected	
2022	Bahia gubernatorial election	MDB	Vice-governor	4,480,464	52.79%	Elected	
