= Bahia =

State of Brazil

- State
- Flag Coat of arms
- Motto: Per ardua surgo (Latin) "I rise through the hardship"
- Anthem: Hino da Bahia
- Location in Brazil
- Coordinates: 12°S 41°W
- Country: Brazil
- Region: Northeast
- Capital and largest city: Salvador

Government
  - Type: Unitary state
  - Governor: Jerônimo Rodrigues (PT)
  - Vice Governor: Geraldo Júnior (MDB)
  - Senators: Angelo Coronel (REP); Jaques Wagner (PT); Otto Alencar (PSD)
  - Legislature: Legislative Assembly of Bahia

Area
  - Total: 565,733 km^{2} (218,431 sq mi)
  - Rank: 5th

Population (2025)
  - Total: 14,870,907
  - Rank: 4th
  - Density: 26.2861/km^{2} (68.0807/sq mi)
  - Rank: 15th
- Demonym(s): Bahian (English), Baiano or Baiana (Brazilian Portuguese)

GDP (2024)
  - Total: R$467.748 billion (US$86.798 billion)

HDI
  - Year: 2024
  - Category: 0.759 – high (23rd)
- Time zone: UTC−03:00 (BRT)
- Postal Code: 40000-000 to 48990-000
- ISO 3166 code: BR-BA
- Website: www.ba.gov.br

Bahia (English: /bəˈ(h)iːə/, bə-(H)EE-ə; Brazilian Portuguese: [baˈi.ɐ]) is one of the 26 states of Brazil, located in the Northeast Region of the country. It is the fourth-largest Brazilian state by population (after São Paulo, Minas Gerais, and Rio de Janeiro) and the 5th-largest by area. Bahia's capital is the city of Salvador (formerly known as "Cidade do São Salvador da Bahia de Todos os Santos", literally "City of the Holy Savior of the Bay of All the Saints"), on a spit of land separating the Bay of All Saints from the Atlantic. Once a stronghold of supporters of direct rule of Brazil by the Portuguese monarchy, and dominated by agricultural, slaving, and ranching interests, Bahia is now a predominantly working-class industrial and agricultural state. The state is home to 7% of the Brazilian population and produces 4.2% of the country's GDP. It is divided into 417 municipalities.

== Geography ==
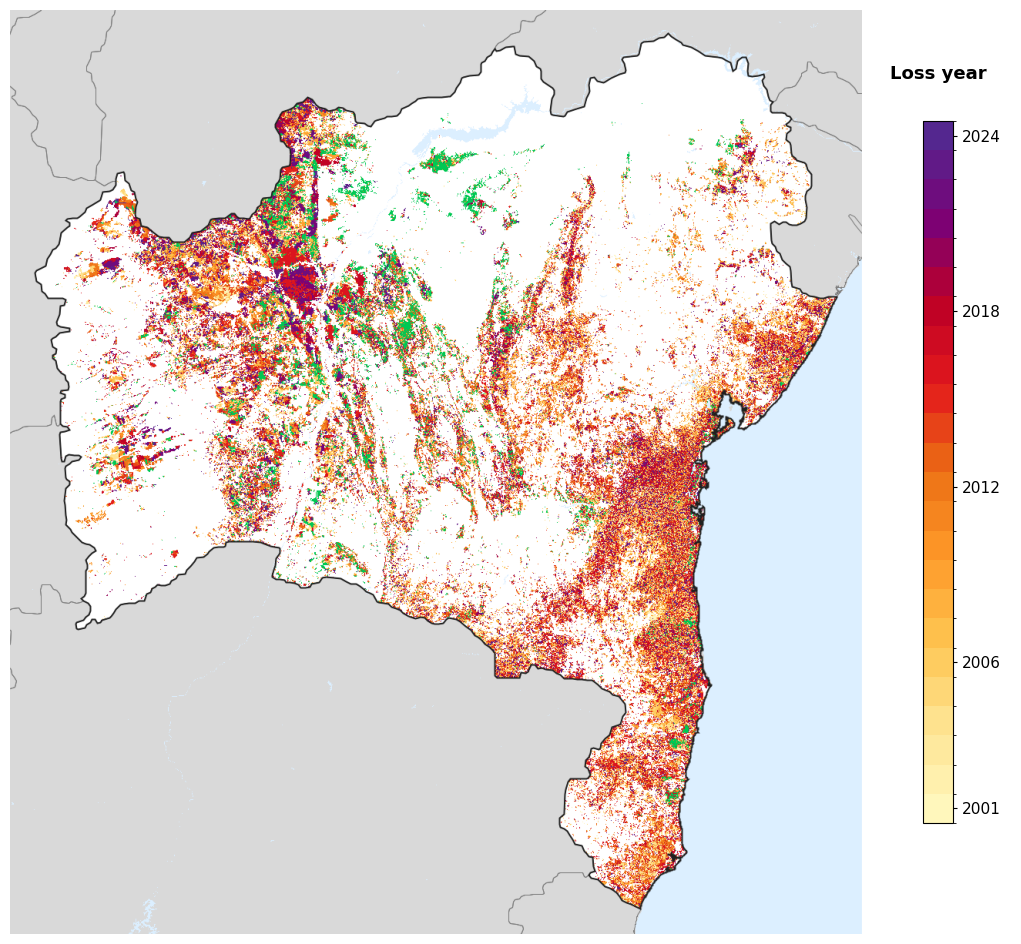
Tree-cover loss year in Bahia, 2001–2024, from the Global Forest Change dataset.

Bahia is bordered on the east by the Atlantic Ocean. The Bay of All Saints is the largest bay on the Brazilian coast. Under the Brazilian Empire, it was bounded on the north by the Rio Real and by the Jequitinhonha on the south, but Bahia now comprises an irregular shape bound by other states of Brazil, some of which were formed from it. In the north, it is now bordered (from east to west) by Sergipe, Alagoas, Pernambuco and Piauí. In the northwest, it is bordered by Tocantins. In the southwest, it borders Goiás, and in the south it is bordered (from east to west) by Espírito Santo and Minas Gerais.

The state is crossed from west to east by many rivers, but the most important is the São Francisco, which starts in Minas Gerais and runs through western Bahia before emptying into the Atlantic between Sergipe and Alagoas. Formerly plied by paddlewheel steamers, the river is only navigable to small modern craft but is still vital to the arid west since it continuously supplies water during seasons. The Sobradinho Dam created one of the largest reservoirs in the world; other major hydroelectric projects along its length include the Paulo Afonso Hydroelectric Complex and the Itaparica or Luiz Gonzaga Dam.

=== Regions ===
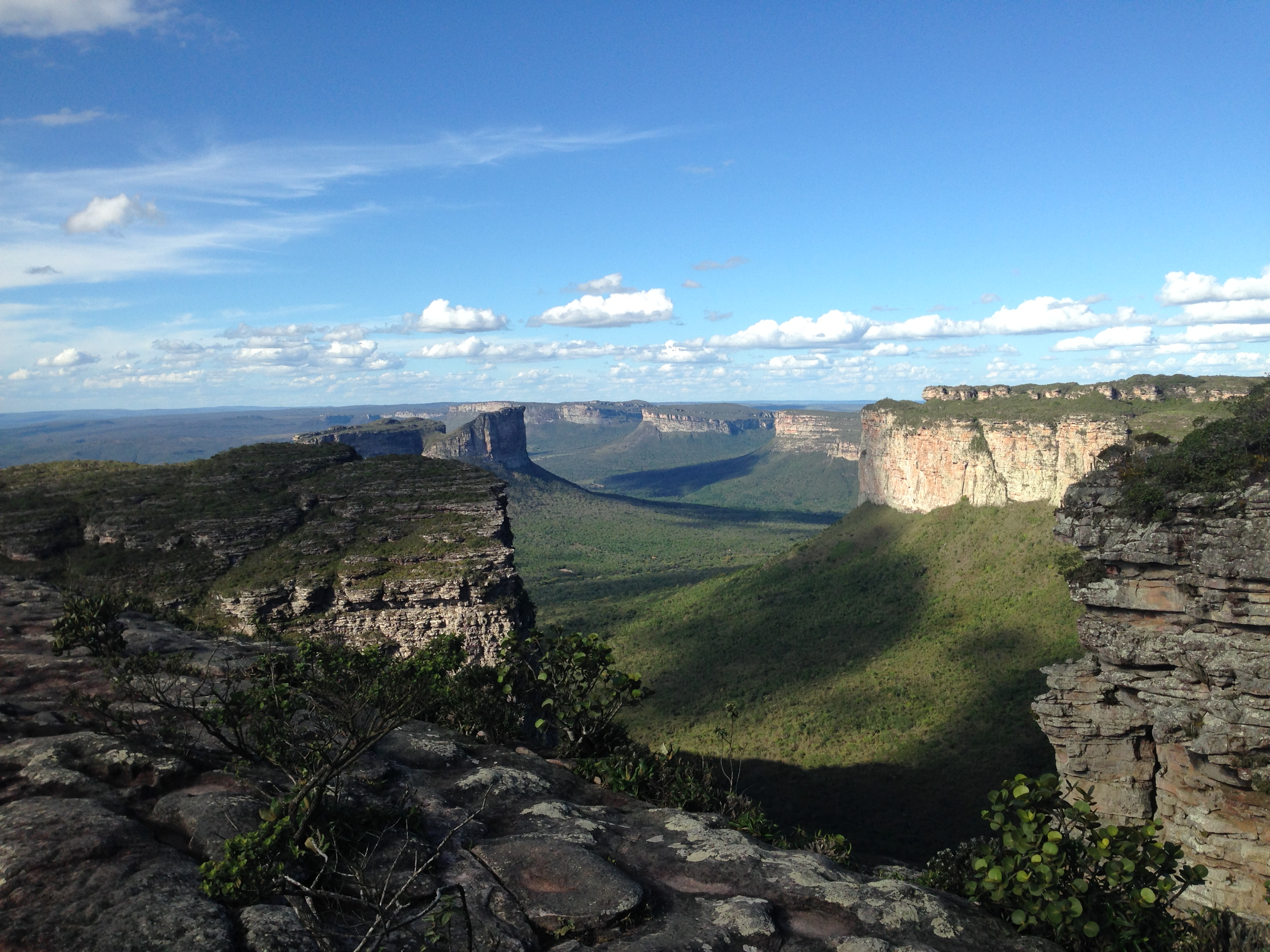
Chapada Diamantina National Park

Bahia's geographical regions comprise the Atlantic Forest; the maritime region (Recôncavo) radiating from the Bay of All Saints, the site of sugar and tobacco cultivation; and the Planalto, which includes the sertão region of Bahia's far interior. The state includes the Chapada Diamantina, or Diamantina Tableland, a mountainous area which divides it into two distinct geographical zones. The rain falls regularly in the eastern section. The western area is more arid and its predominate vegetation the cerrado. The natural aridity was greatly worsened over the 19th century by the cowboys' habit of starting wildfires each year to improve the quality of the grass. The Chapada Diamantina National Park is home to picturesque chapadões.

=== Climate ===
Bahia's climate is tropical. It has the longest coastline of the country: 1,103 km long (685 miles; north coast: 143; Bay of All Saints: 124; and southern: 418). With 68% of its territory located in the semi-arid zone, the State presents diversified climates and an average rainfall that varies from 363 to 2,000 mm (14.3 to 78.7 in) per year, depending on the region.

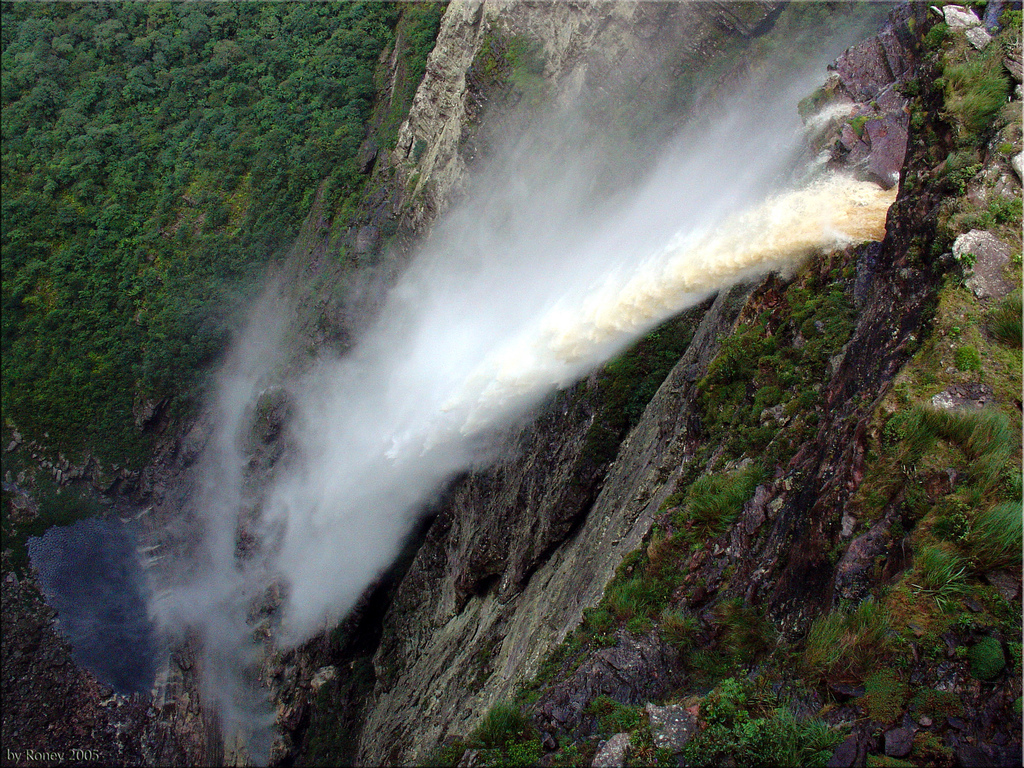
Fumaça Waterfall

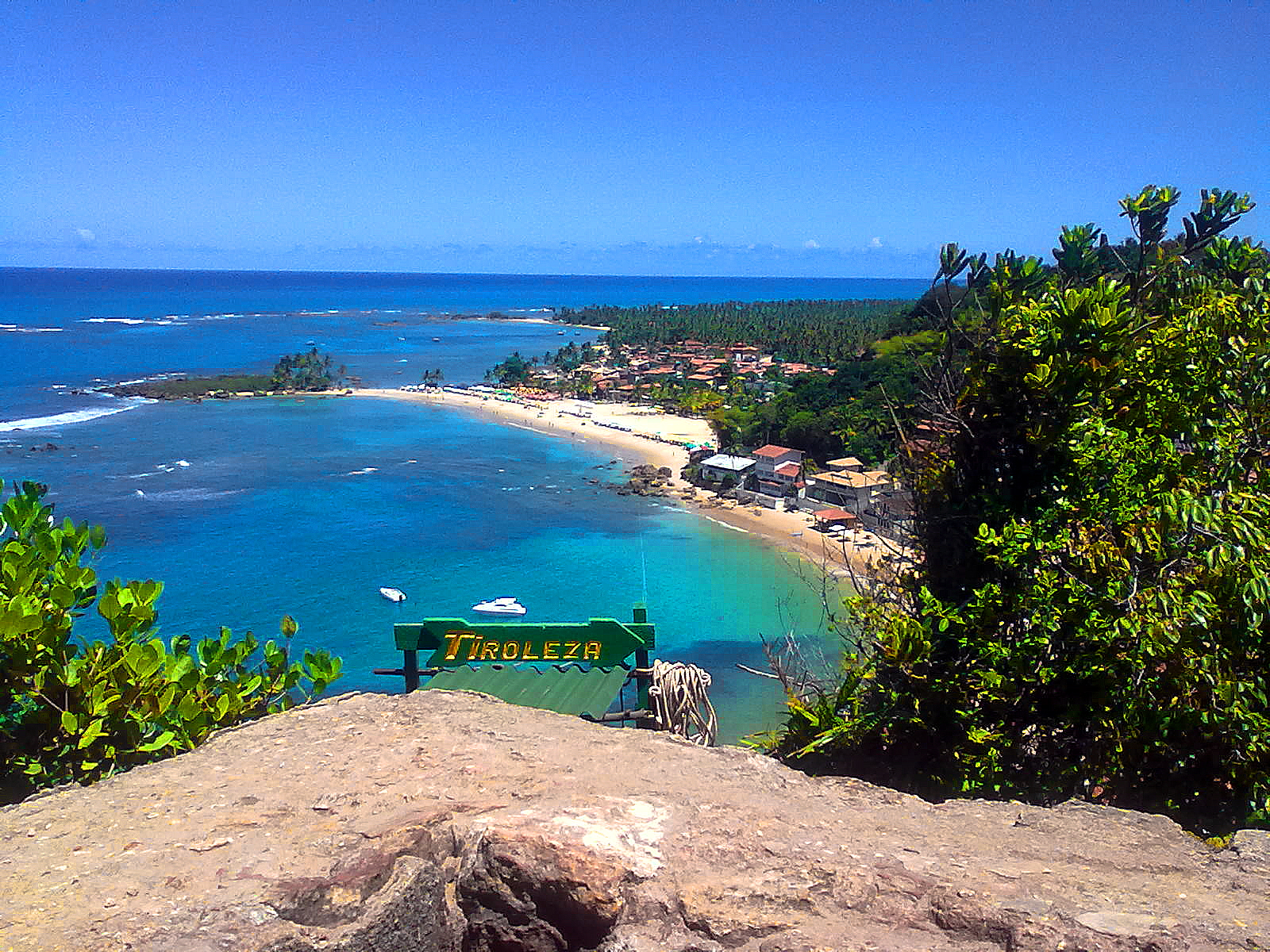
View of Morro de São Paulo

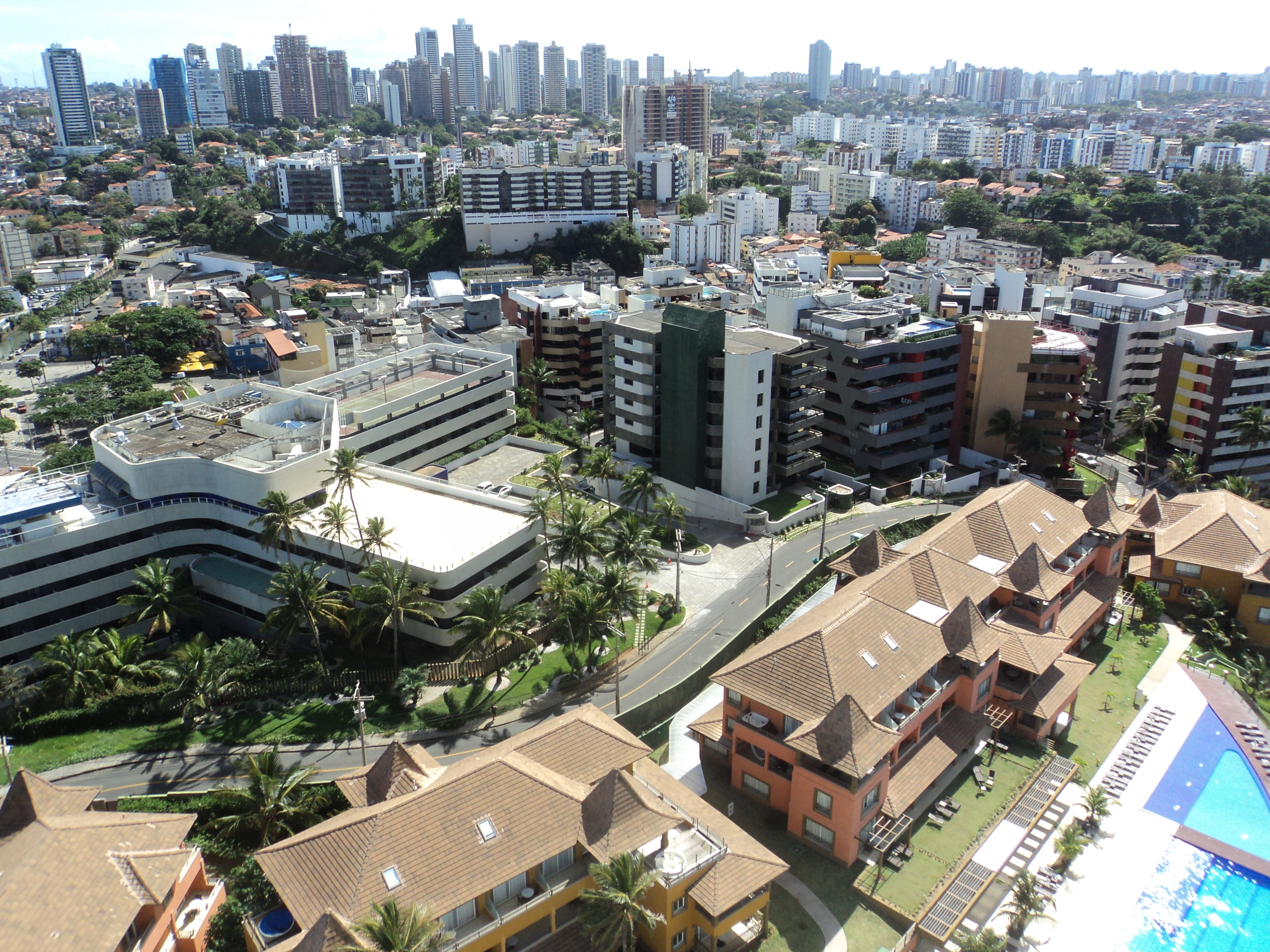
View of Salvador

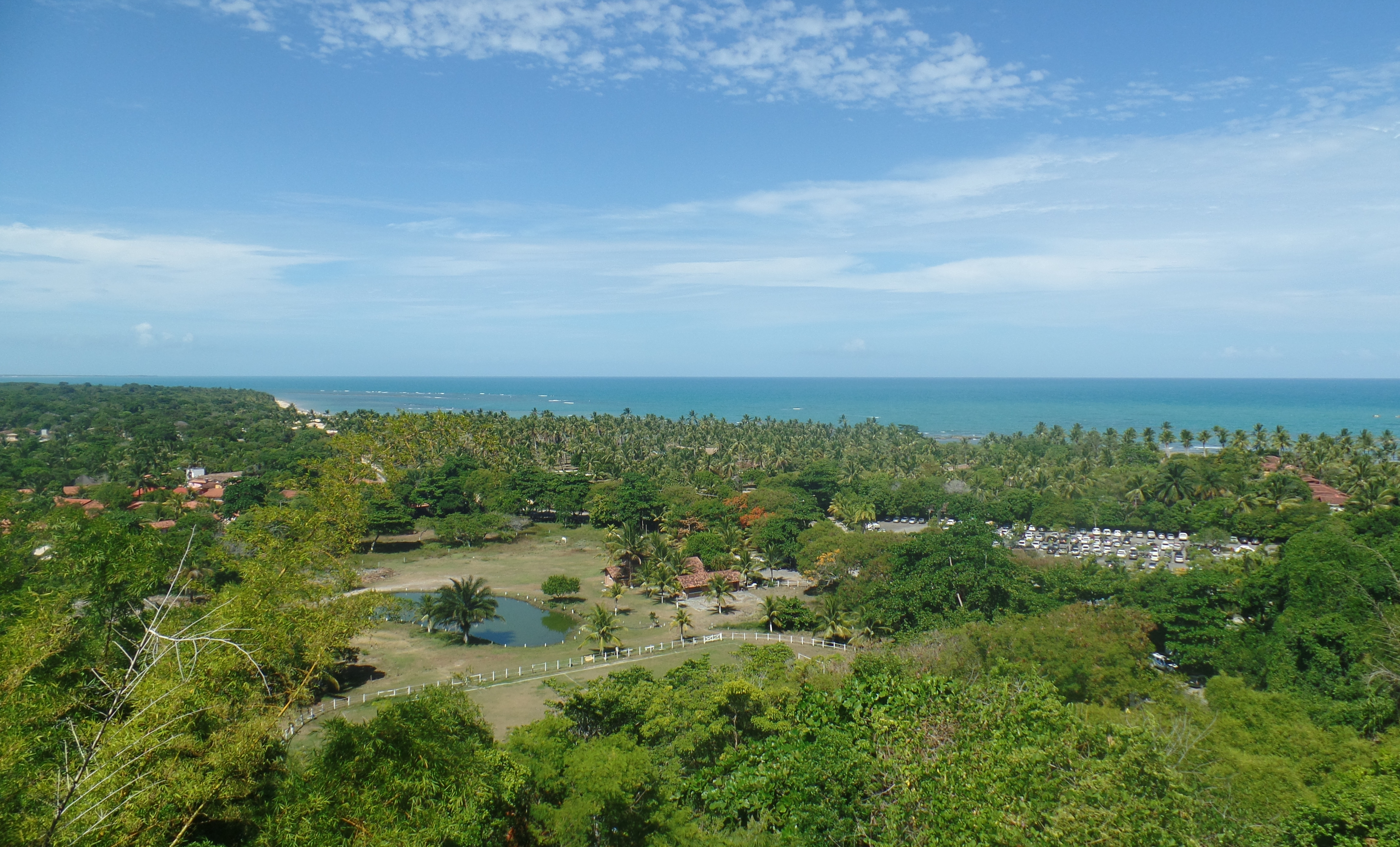
Arraial D'Ajuda coast in Porto Seguro

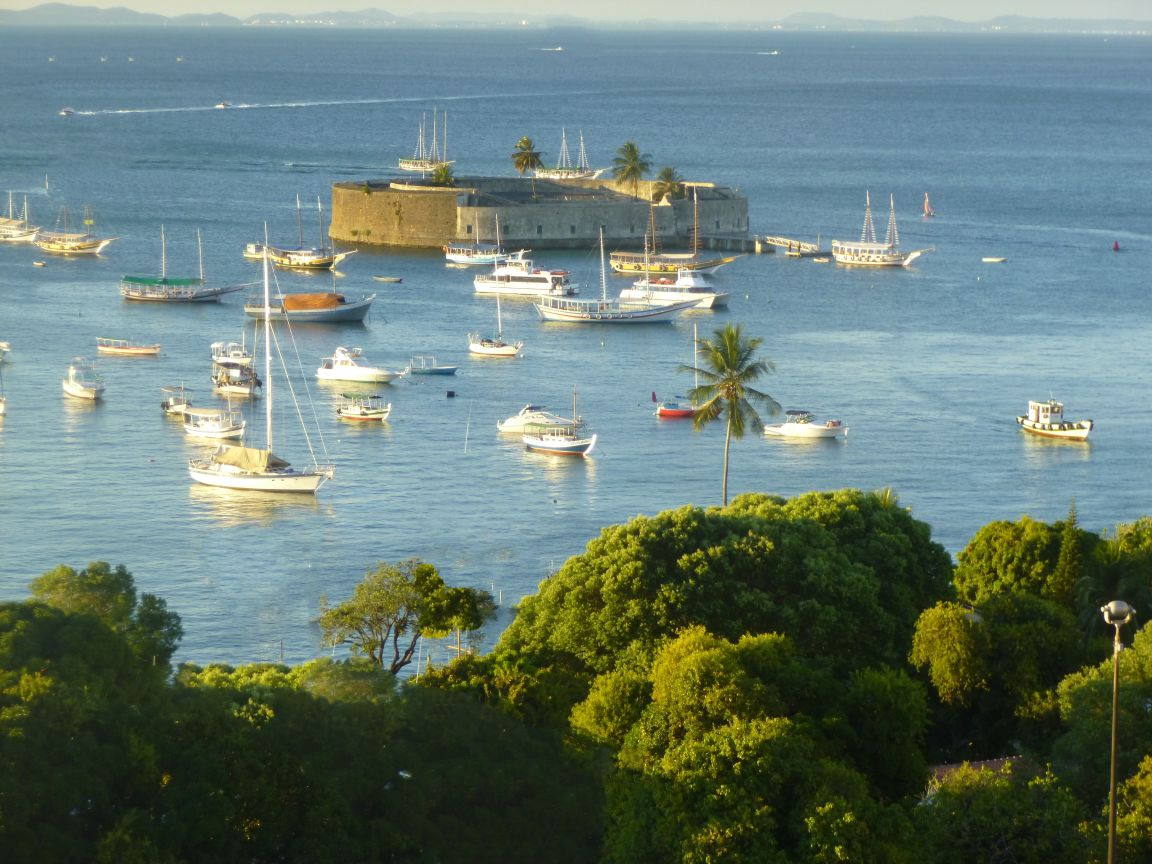
São Marcelo Fort, in the capital of the state

== History ==
Topographical and administrative map of the province of Bahia, 1857

The Portuguese Pedro Álvares Cabral sighted Monte Pascoal ("Easter Mountain") near Itamaraju and landed at what is now Porto Seguro on the southern coast of Bahia in 1500, claiming the territory for Portugal. In 1549, Portugal established the city of Salvador on a hill facing the Bay of All Saints. The city and surrounding captaincy served as an administrative capital of Portugal's colonies in the Americas until 1763. It remained the religious capital of Brazil's Roman Catholic hierarchy, with its archbishop serving as the national primate until 1907. Salvador holds the country's oldest cathedral and first medical college (1810), and an engineering school was established in 1899.

Bahia's captaincy was the first to fail, with its lands reverting to the Portuguese crown in 1549. While Portugal was united with Spain, the Dutch West India companies tried to conquer Bahia but was unsuccessful in the area, with Dutch Brazil restricted to the area from Pernambuco Northward.

Bahia was a center of sugarcane cultivation from the 16th to the 18th centuries and contains a number of historic towns, such as Cachoeira, dating from this era. Integral to the sugar economy was the importation of a vast number of African slaves: more than a third of all slaves taken from Africa were sent to Brazil, mostly to be processed in Bahia before being sent to work in plantations elsewhere in the country.

The state was the last area of the country to join the Empire of Brazil, as members in the local elite remained loyal to the Portuguese crown after the rest of the country proclaimed independence under Pedro I on 7 September 1822. Control of the province was disputed in several battles, mostly in Pirajá, before the Portuguese were fully expelled on 2 July 1823. It became a Brazilian state in 1889.

Charles Darwin visited Bahia in 1832 on his famous voyage on the Beagle. In 1835, Bahia was the site of an urban slave revolt, the Malê Revolt of 1835 by the predominantly Muslim West African slaves at the time. The term malê was commonly used to refer to Muslims at the time from the Yoruba word imale. The revolt is particularly notable as the greatest slave rebellion in the history of the Bahia. Under the Empire, Bahia returned 14 deputies to the general assembly and 7 senators; its own provincial assembly consisted of 36 members. In the 19th century, cotton, coffee, and tobacco plantations joined those for sugarcane and the discovery of diamonds in 1844 led to large influx of "washers" (garimpeiros) until the still-larger deposits in South Africa came to light. A smaller boom hit Caetité in 1872 upon the discovery of amethysts there. The cattle industry of the interior led to the development of Feira de Santana before collapsing in a series of droughts.

== Politics ==
Historically, Bahia's politics and that of the country have been closely intertwined, initially due to Salvador's status as the first capital of Brazil. During the imperial period, several prime ministers originated from Bahia; during the early years of the Republic, Bahia produced some noteworthy national figures, such as Ruy Barbosa, Cezar Zama, and Aristides Spínola, amongst others.

During the First Brazilian Republic (República Velha) the biggest name in the state's politics was José Joaquim Seabra, also known as J. J. Seabra; the Vargas era and the subsequent re-democratization period saw the rise of Juracy Magalhães and Otávio Mangabeira, respectively. During the military dictatorship, the governorship of Antônio Carlos Magalhães (also known by his initials, ACM) marked the politics of Bahia for three decades, with one brief defeat in 1980 by Waldir Pires. Despite this defeat ACM later occupied many other public offices; he died in 2007 while serving as senator. ACM's wide-reaching influence in the state's politics has been dubbed "Carlismo", and is considered an example of a larger phenomenon called coronelismo ("colonel-ism").

After the end of military rule in Brazil in 1985, the government of the state of Bahia oscillated between two parties, the Partido da Frente Liberal (PFL, now the Democrats) and the Brazilian Democratic Movement (MDB). The Workers' Party (PT) was elected to the governorship in 2007 and has held it ever since, through five successive elections (2006, 2010, 2014, 2018, and 2022).

=== Government structure ===
As a federative unit of Brazil, Bahia has its own three branches of government (executive, legislative, judiciary), which are operated by the Governor, the Legislative Assembly and the Court of Justice of the State of Bahia, respectively. Elected terms last four years, with state and federal elections being held simultaneously. The governor of the state is limited to two consecutive terms. The Legislative Assembly is composed of 63 state deputies. At the federal level, Bahia is represented by three senators and 39 federal deputies. Municipal elections are held two years after the state and federal elections.

The state capital is the city of Salvador, but once a year the capital is moved to Cachoeira in recognition of the city's importance in the struggle for the independence of Brazil.

There are 10,110,100 registered voters, according to data from 2012, making Bahia the state with the fourth highest number of voters in the country. Most voters reside in the capital (and most populous city), Salvador.

All 29 parties registered in Brazil have chapters in Bahia.

== Demographics ==
According to IBGE data of 2022, there were 14,141,626 people residing in the state. The population density was 24.93 inhabitants per square kilometre (64.6/sq mi). Urban population: 67.4% (2006); Population growth: 1.1% (1991–2000); Houses: 3,826,000 (2006). The last National Census in 2022 showed the following numbers: 8,103,964 Brown (Multiracial) people (57.3%), 2,772,837 White people (19.60%), 3,164,691 Black people (22.4%), 83,658 Amerindian people (0.6%).

According to Instituto Socioambiental, there are 14 Indigenous groups in the state: Atikum, Kaimbé, Kantaruré, Kiriri, Pankaru, Pankararé, Pataxó, Pataxó Hã-ha-hãe, Payayá, Truká, Tumbalalá, Tupinambá, Tuxá and Xukuru-Kariri.

Historically, the population was estimated at 1.45 million in the 1870s and was 1.92 million at the time of the 1890 Brazilian census.

=== Largest cities ===
Largest cities or towns in Bahia (2022 census by the Brazilian Institute of Geography and Statistics)
Rank		Mesoregion	Pop.	Rank		Mesoregion	Pop.
1	Salvador	Salvador	2,417,678	11	Alagoinhas	Nordeste	151,055
2	Feira de Santana	Centro-Norte	616,272	12	Porto Seguro	Sul	149,326
3	Vitória da Conquista	Centro-Sul	370,879	13	Teixeira de Freitas	Sul	145,216
4	Camaçari	Salvador	300,372	14	Simões Filho	Salvador	114,559
5	Juazeiro	São-Franciscana	237,821	15	Eunápolis	Sul	113,710
6	Lauro de Freitas	Salvador	203,331	16	Paulo Afonso	São-Franciscana	112,870
7	Itabuna	Sul	186,708	17	Santo Antônio de Jesus	Salvador	103,055
8	Ilhéus	Sul	178,649	18	Guanambi	Centro-Sul	87,817
9	Jequié	Centro-Sul	158,813	19	Valença	Sul	85,655
10	Barreiras	Extremo Oeste	155,734	20	Candeias	Salvador	72,312

Historical population
Year	Pop.	±%
1872	1,379,616	—
1890	1,919,802	+39.2%
1900	2,117,956	+10.3%
1920	3,334,465	+57.4%
1940	3,918,112	+17.5%
1950	4,834,575	+23.4%
1960	5,990,605	+23.9%
1970	7,583,140	+26.6%
1980	9,597,393	+26.6%
1991	11,855,157	+23.5%
2000	13,085,769	+10.4%
2010	14,016,906	+7.1%
2022	14,141,626	+0.9%

=== Public safety ===
Bahia has one of the highest crime rates in the country, having four of the ten most violent cities in Brazil. Gun violence in the state more than doubled from 2004 to 2014, ranking first out of the 26 states of Brazil. In 2014, the state also had the highest number of murders in the country.

Religion in Bahia (2010)
1. Catholicism (65.2%)
2. Protestantism (17.4%)
3. Spiritism (1.10%)
4. Other (4.30%)
5. Unaffiliated (12.0%)

=== Education ===
==== Educational institutions ====
- Centro Universitário da Bahia (FIB; University Centre of Bahia)
- Escola Bahiana de Medicina e Saúde Pública (EBMSP; Bahian School of Medicine and Public Health)
- Federal do Vale do São Francisco
- Instituto Federal da Bahia (IFBA)
- Instituto Federal Baiano (IFBAIANO)
- Universidade Católica de Salvador (UCSal; Catholic University of Salvador)
- Universidade do Estado da Bahia (UNEB; Bahia State University)
- Universidade Estadual de Feira de Santana (UEFS; State University of Feira de Santana)
- Universidade Estadual de Santa Cruz (UESC; State University of Santa Cruz)
- Universidade Estadual do Sudoeste da Bahia (Uesb; State University of Southwest of Bahia)
- Universidade Federal da Bahia (UFBA; Federal University of Bahia)
- Universidade Federal do Recôncavo da Bahia (UFRB; Federal University of Recôncavo da Bahia)
- Universidade Salvador (Unifacs; Salvador University)

== Culture ==
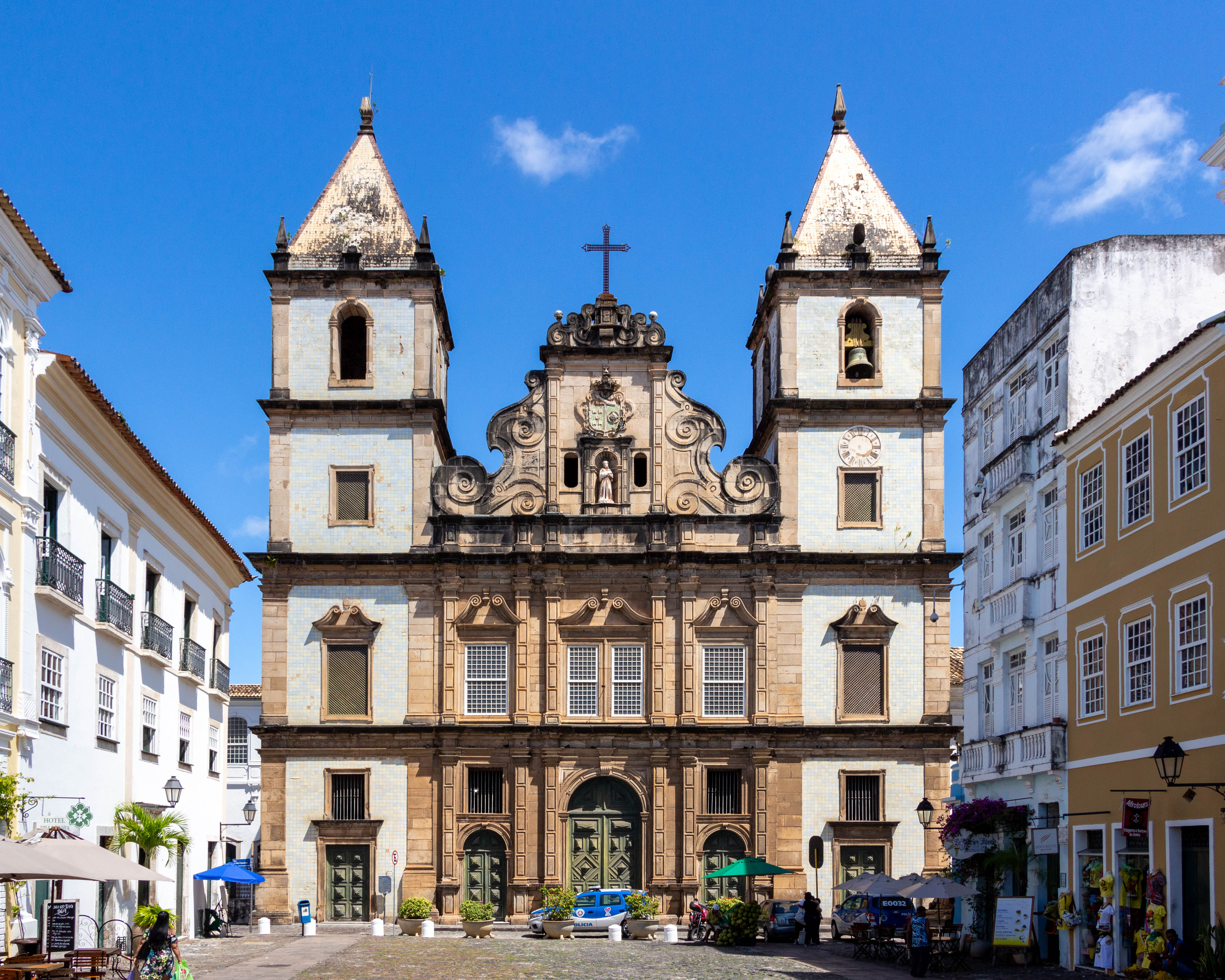
Church and Convent of São Francisco in Salvador

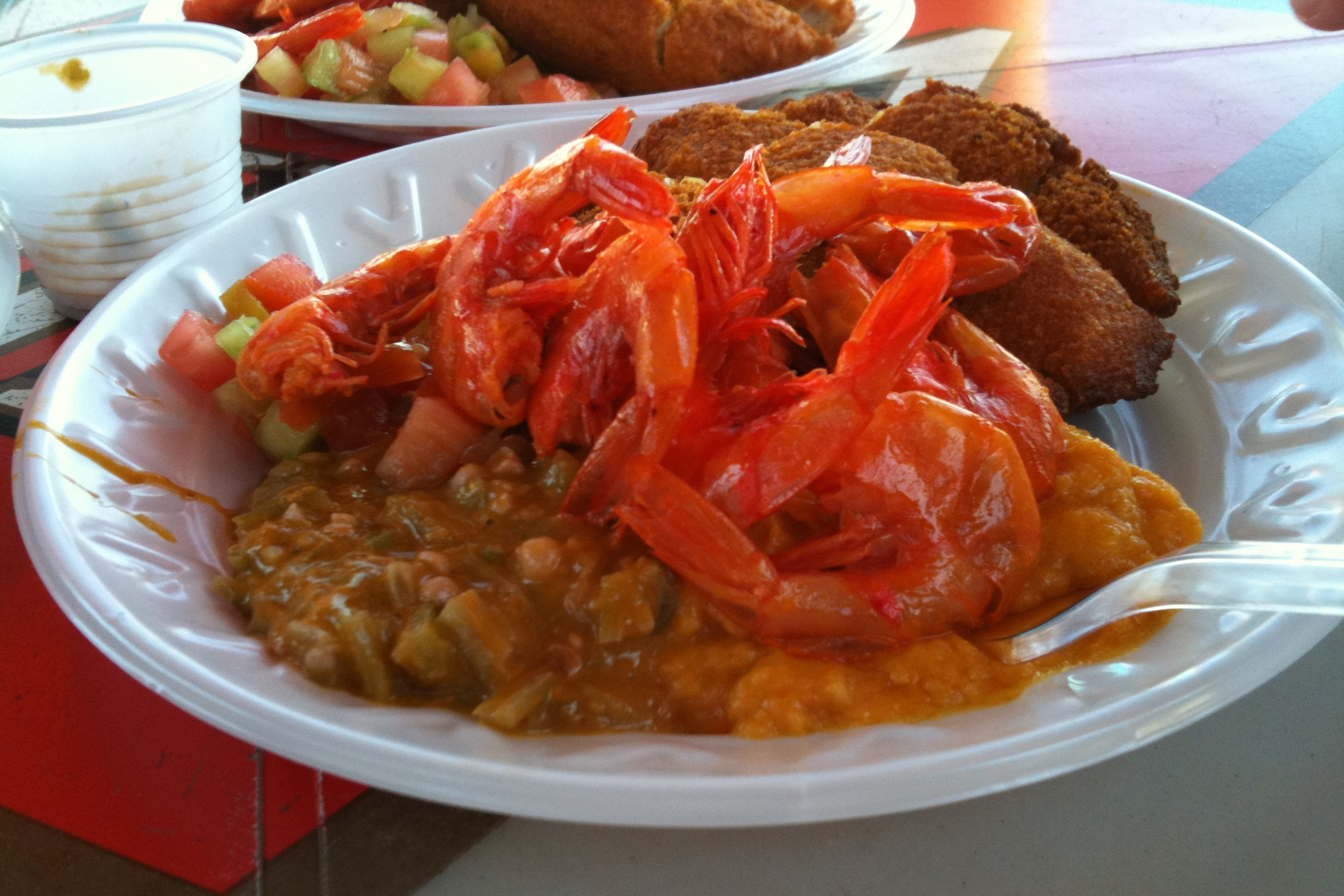
Acarajé is a symbol of cuisine from Bahia

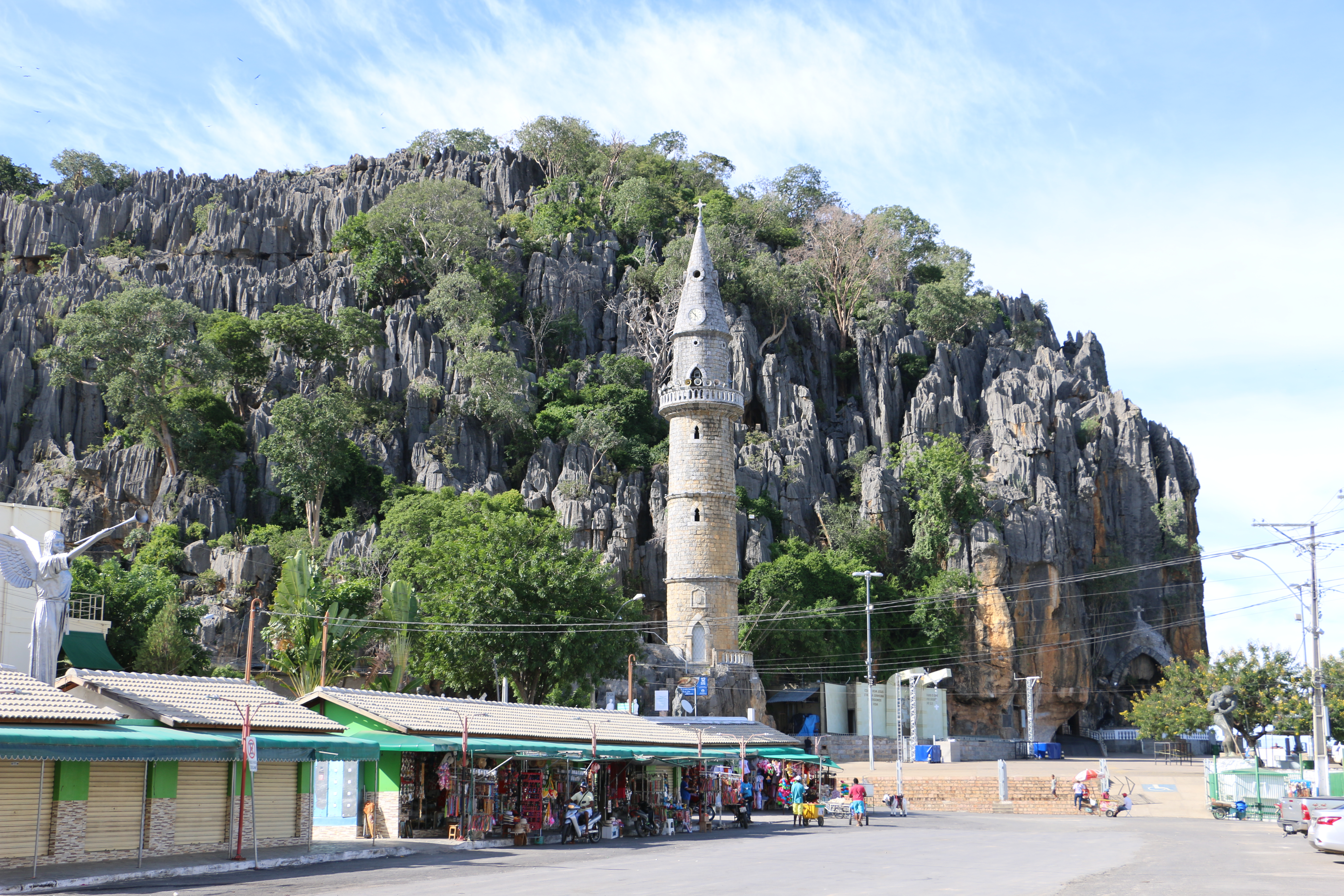
A Christocentric and Marian sanctuary dedicated to Bom Jesus da Lapa and Our Lady of Solitude, founded in 1691. This Catholic pilgrimage site welcomes nearly three million pilgrims annually. Bom Jesus da Lapa

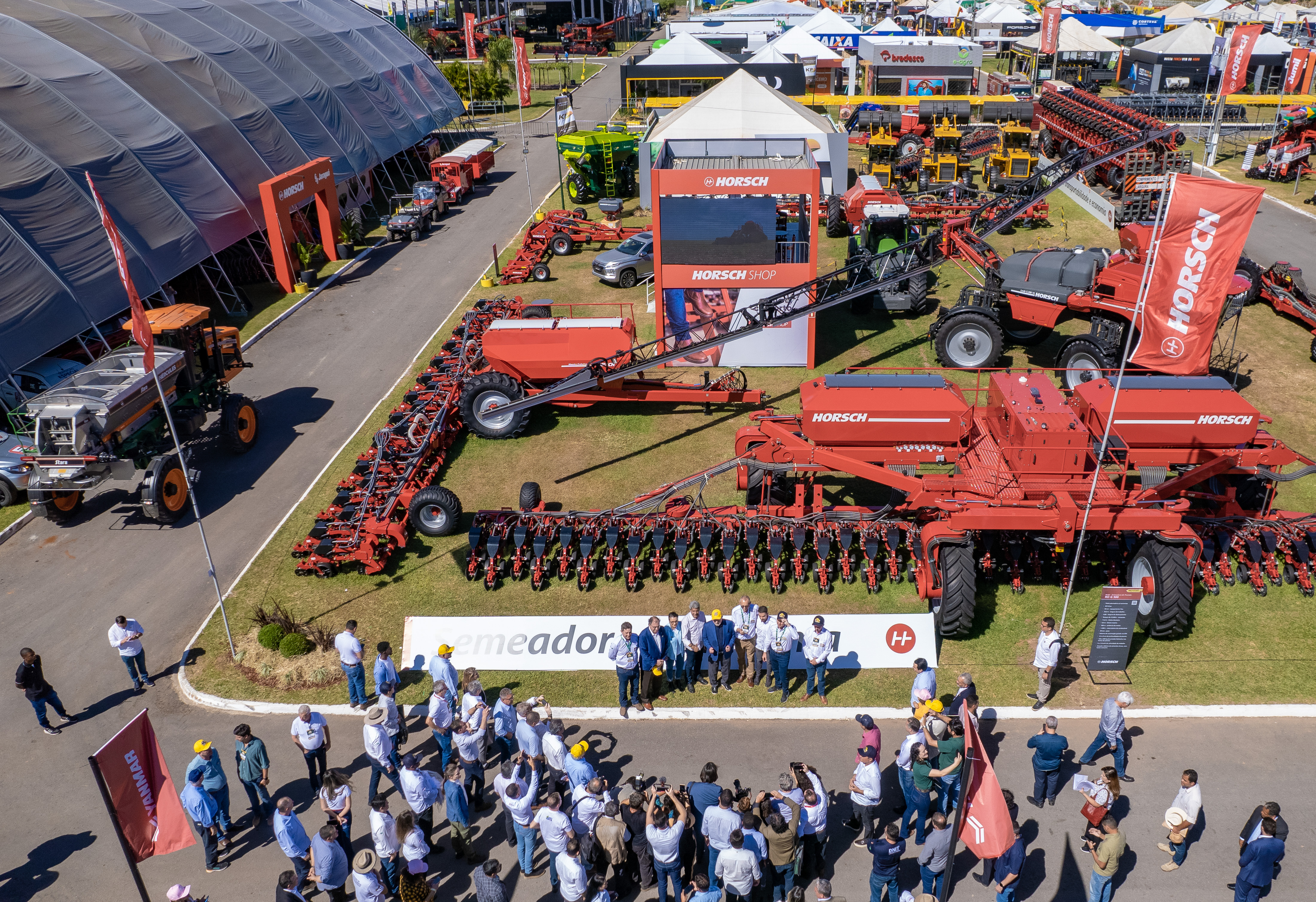
Bahia Farm Show event annual in Luís Eduardo Magalhães

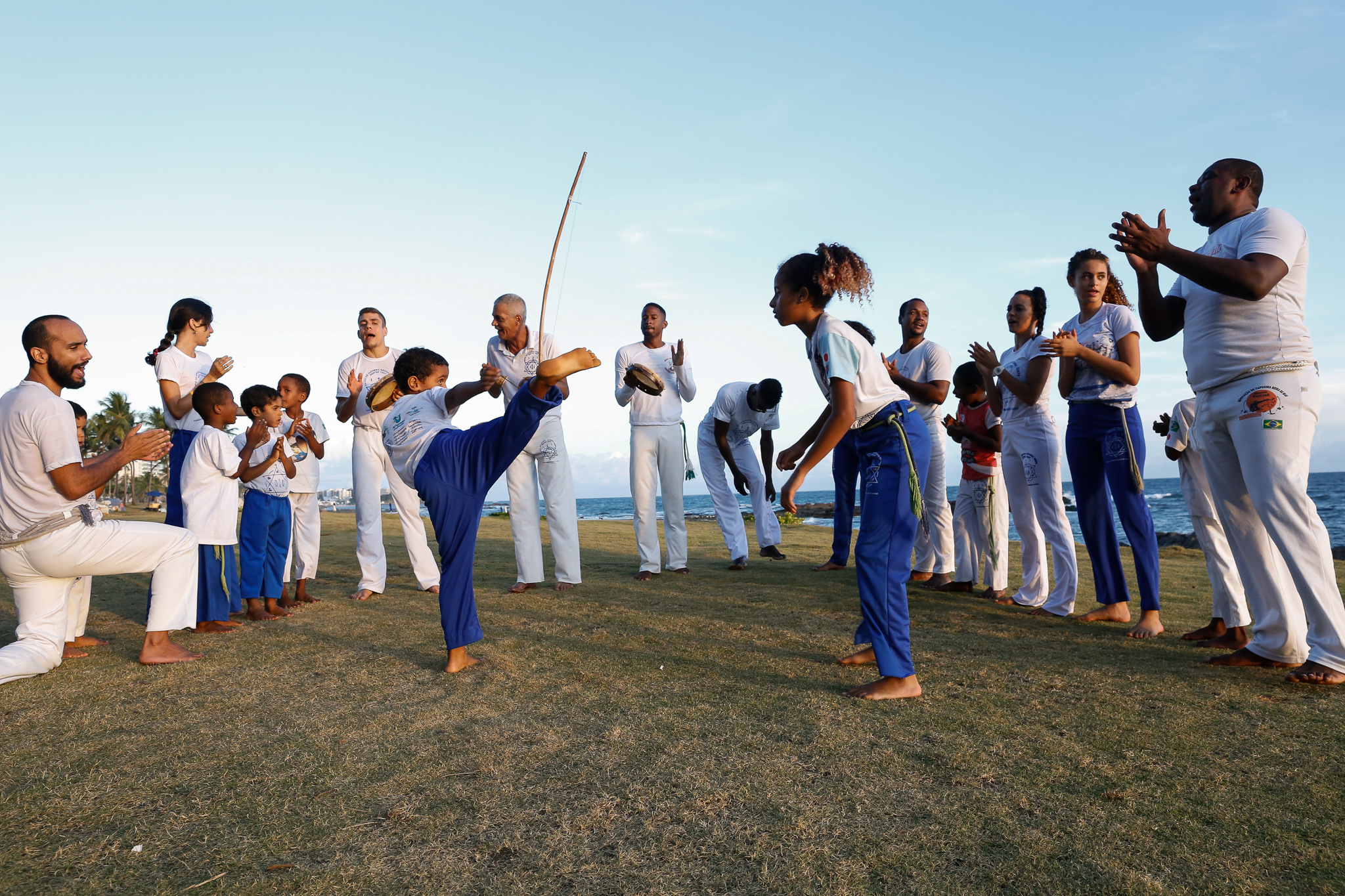
Capoeira in Salvador

As the chief locus of the early Brazilian slave trade, Bahia is considered to possess the greatest and most distinctive African imprint, in terms of culture and customs, in Brazil. These include the Yoruba-derived religious system of Candomblé, capoeira (martial art), African-derived music such as samba (especially Brazilian samba precursor, the samba-de-roda), Samba-reggae, afoxé, and axé, and a cuisine with strong links to western Africa, mainly in Salvador.

In the interior of the state, there is the traditional culture of the vaqueiros among agricultural communities. From the 1550s onward, in Bahia, these farmers were integral to the process of expansion away from the coasts of Brazil. And the emphasis of the Tropicália movement.

=== Arts ===
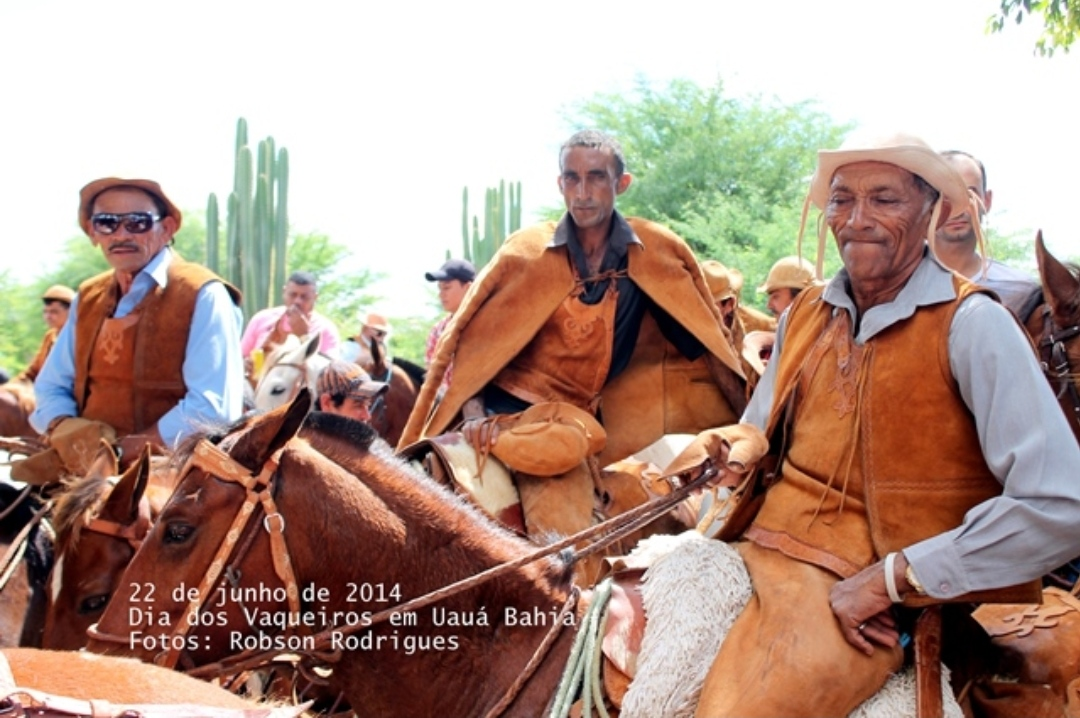
Vaqueiros in Uauá city, Bahia

Bahia is the birthplace of many noted Brazilian artists, writers and musicians. There are exponents of various musical genres in the state, such as Dorival Caymmi, João Gilberto, Astrud Gilberto, Gilberto Gil and Caetano Veloso, Tom Zé, (with Tropicália), to the rhythmic introductions of the batucada by Olodum and Carlinhos Brown in Samba-reggae passing by Daniela Mercury and Ivete Sangalo in Axé Music, Raul Seixas or Pitty (in rock baiano) and highly successful musical groups such as Novos Baianos, Chiclete com Banana, Timbalada, among many others in bossa nova, samba, pagode, Brega and Arrocha, tropicalismo, from brazilian rock, axé and samba-reggae, Lambada and Forró.

During the 19th century, one of Brazil's greatest poets, the Bahian abolitionist poet and playwright Castro Alves, a native of the recôncavo city of Cachoeira, penned his poem, Navio negreiro, about slavery; the poem is considered a masterpiece of Brazilian Romanticism and a central anti-slavery text.

Other notable Bahian writers include playwright and screenwriter Dias Gomes, Gregório de Matos, who wrote during the 17th century and was one of the first Brazilian writers, and Fr. António Vieira, who during the colonial period was one of many authors who contributed to the expansion of the Portuguese language throughout the Brazilian territory.

One of Brazil's most prominent writers of the 20th century, Jorge Amado, was born in the southeastern Bahian city of Itabuna, and resided for many years in Salvador. His major novels include Gabriela, Clove and Cinnamon; Dona Flor and Her Two Husbands; and Tieta, the Goat Girl, all of which became internationally renowned films. Other notable authors from Bahia include the fiction writers João Ubaldo Ribeiro and historic writer Euclides da Cunha, who wrote "Os Sertões".

In the visual and plastic arts, one of the best known Bahian figures was the multigenre artist and Argentinian native Hector Julio Páride Bernabó, also known as Carybé (1911–1997). Fine examples of his work are visible in the Afro-Brazilian Museum in Salvador.

=== Cinema ===
The film director, actor, and screenwriter, Glauber Rocha, was born in the south-west Bahian city of Vitória da Conquista and was one of the most influential moviemakers of Brazilian cinema. A key figure of Cinema Novo, his films Black God, White Devil and Entranced Earth are often considered to be two of the greatest successes in Brazilian cinematic history, being selected by Abraccine as, respectively, the second and fifth best Brazilian films of all time.

There are also several national film productions based in Bahia, such as O Pagador de Promessas, Tenda dos Milagres, Cidade Baixa and Ó Paí, Ó. The state is also the birthplace of renowned actor Wagner Moura, winner of the Cannes Film Festival Award for Best Actor for his performance in The Secret Agent (2025), as well as a Golden Globe nomination for playing Pablo Escobar in Narcos, and an Annie Awards nomination for his voice-acting performance as Death in Puss in Boots: The Last Wish (2022).

=== Tourism and recreation ===
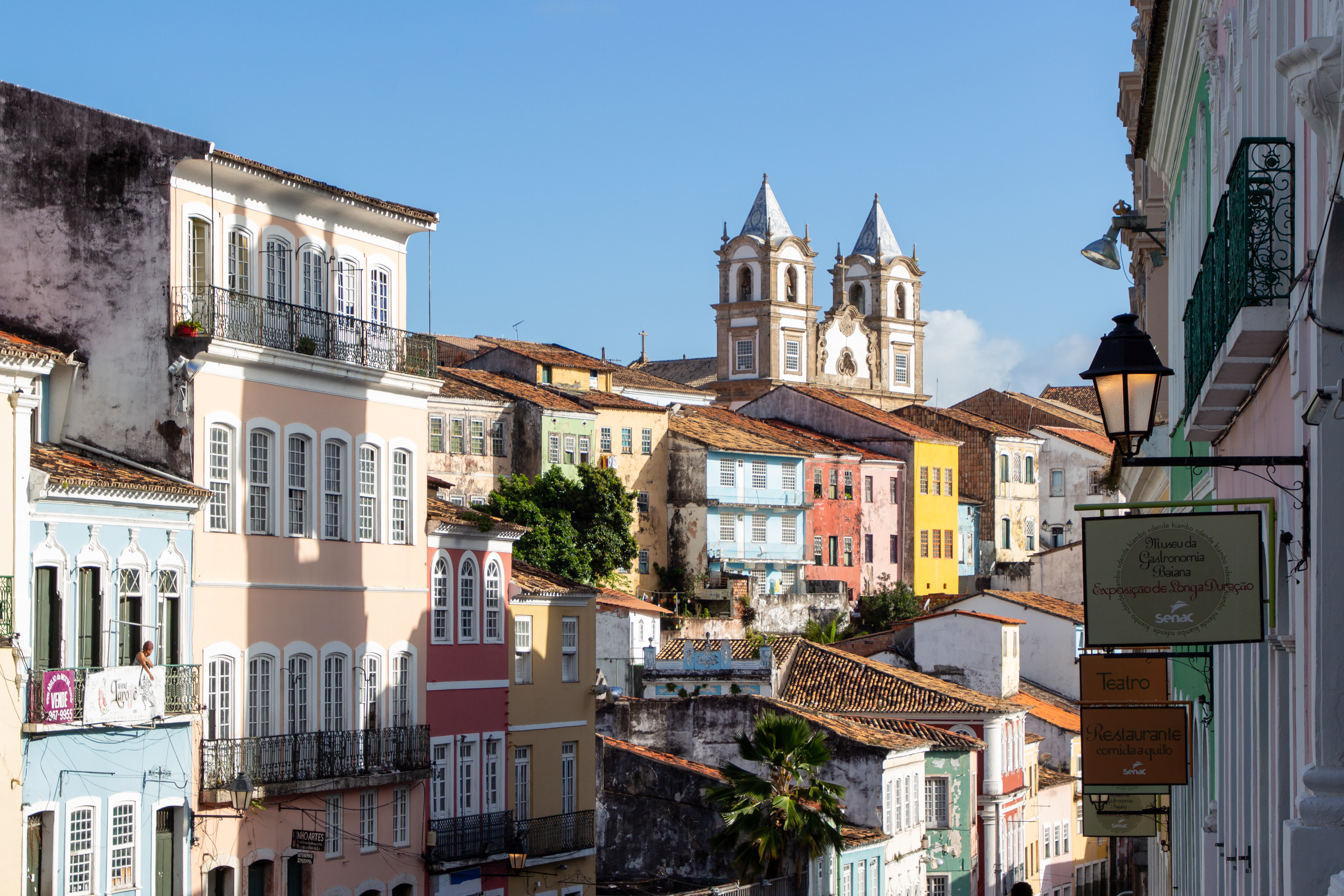
Colonial Portuguese architecture in Pelourinho, Salvador

There is a World Heritage Site in Salvador. Pelourinho was once Salvador's principal red-light district as well as a working-class neighborhood that was home to thousands of Afro-Brazilians. Since 1992, however, the overwhelming majority of these people have been forcibly removed and replaced by boutiques, NGO headquarters, government offices, folkloric representations, monuments, and amenities for tourists.

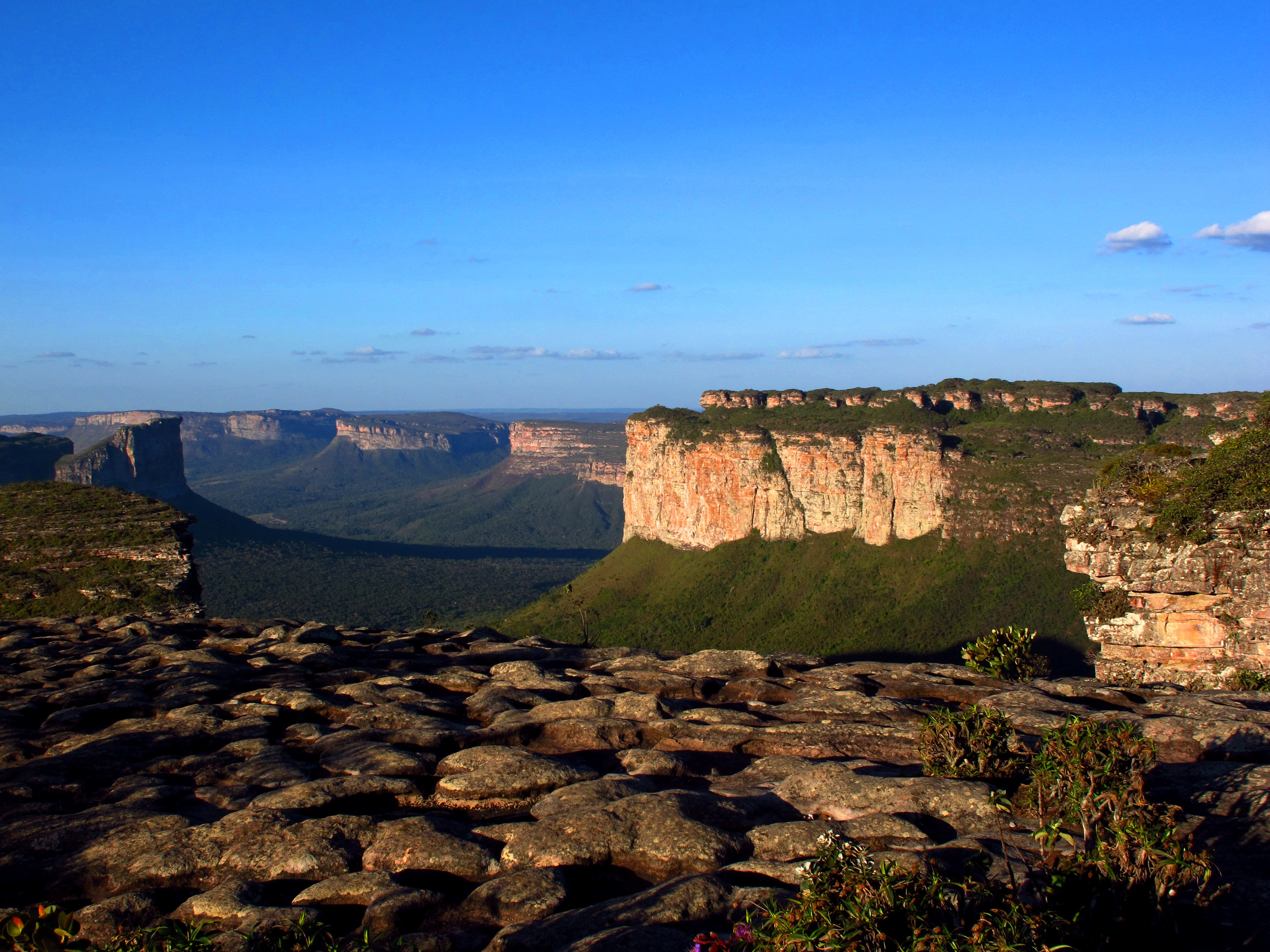
Chapada Diamantina

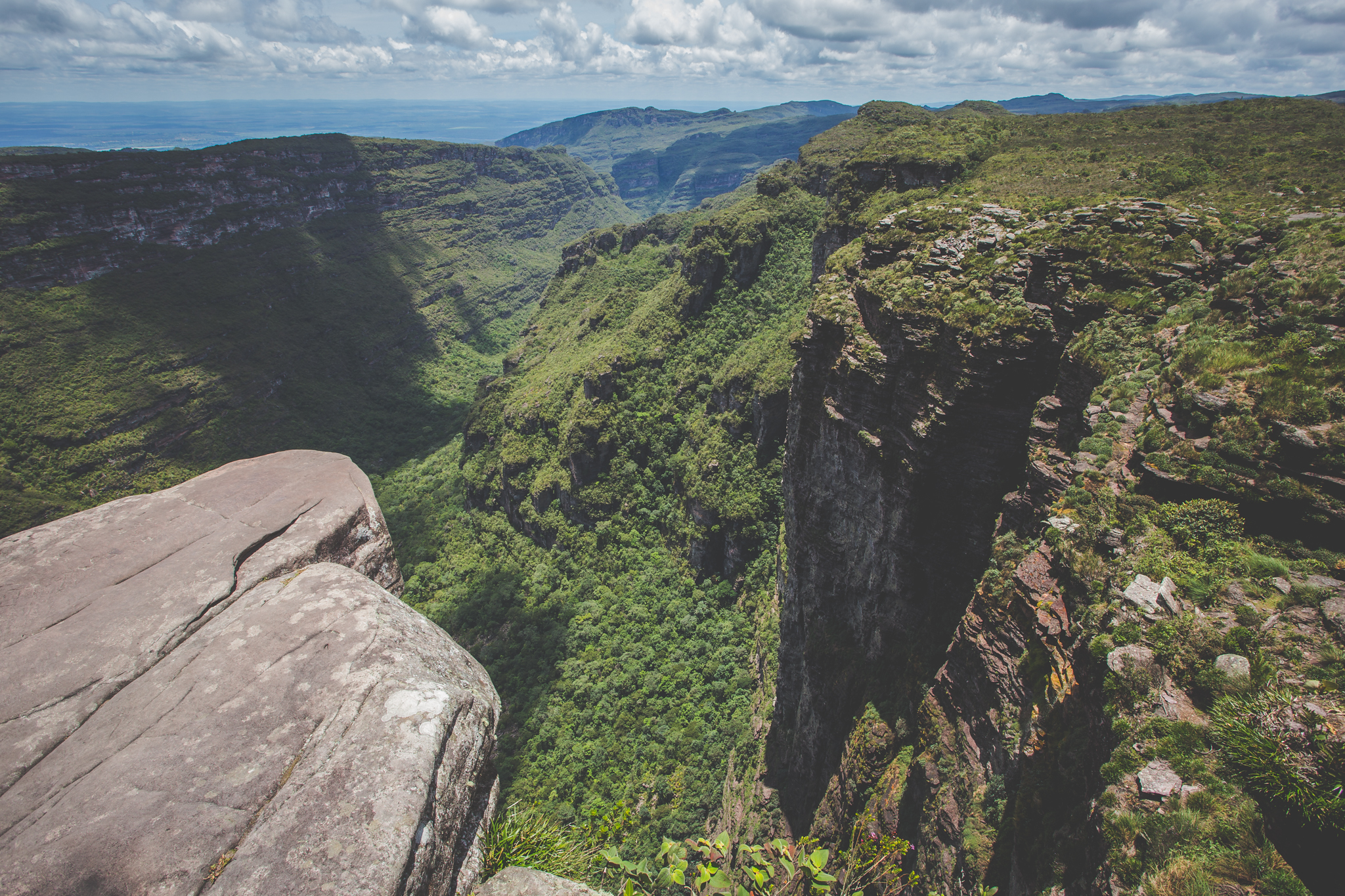
Canyon in Vale do Capão, Bahia

Pictographs in Parque Nacional da Chapada Diamantina

Chapada Diamantina ([ʃaˈpadɐ dʒi.ɐmɐ̃ˈtʃĩnɐ]; Portuguese for the "Diamond Plateau") is a region of, an extensive plateau (38,000 km^{2}), which corresponds to 15% of the State of Bahia, with mountains and unique landscapes. Horácio de Mattos Airport was built in the city of Lençóis to promote tourism in the region. It has the second largest runway in the state.

== Economy ==
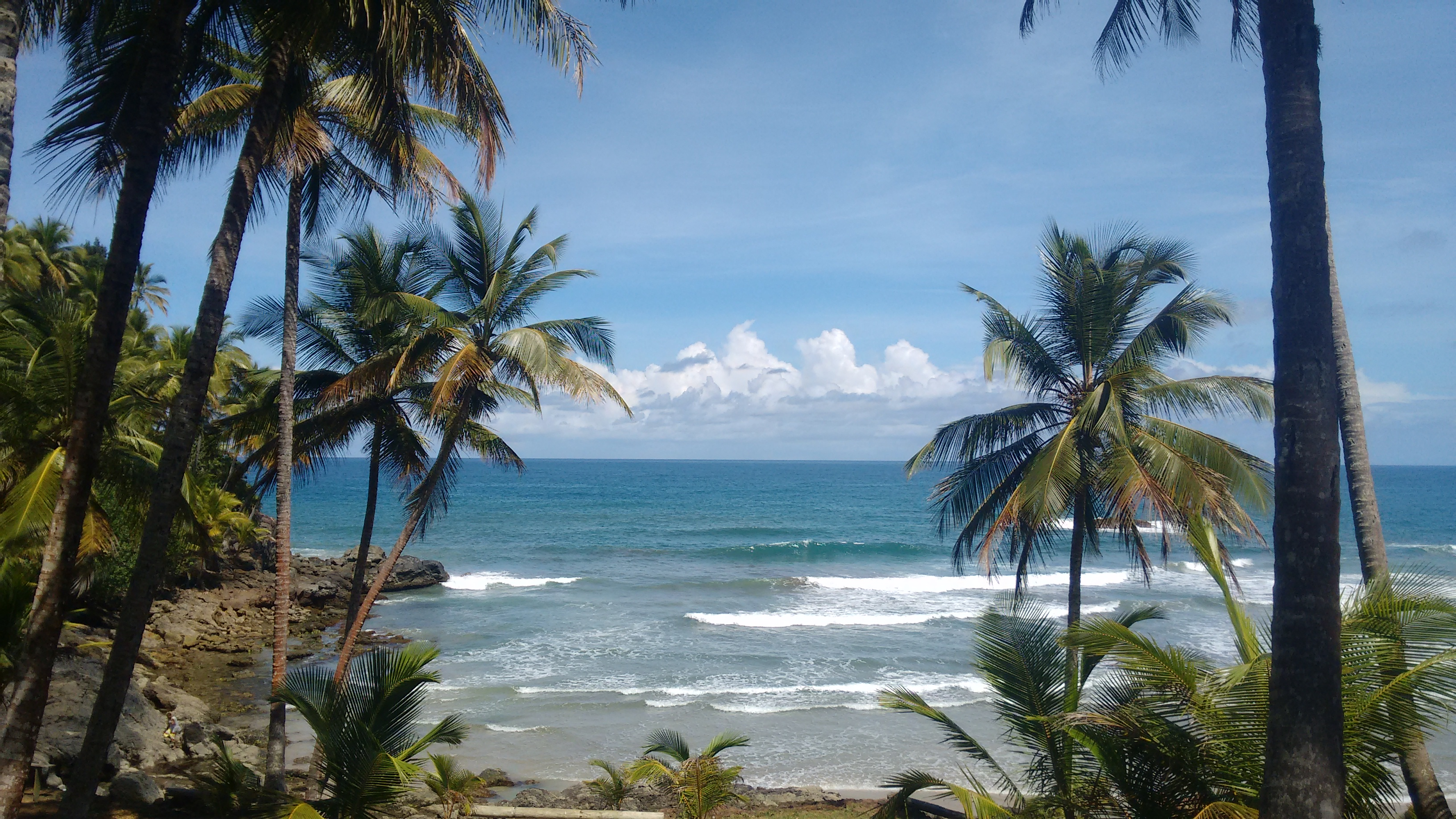
Beach in Itacaré

In 2004, Bahia comprised 4.9% of the economic activity of Brazil and it has the biggest GDP of the states of the North and Northeast. The industrial sector is the largest component of GDP at 48.5%, followed by the service sector at 40.8%. Agriculture represents 10.7% of GDP (2004). Bahia exports: chemicals 22.4%, fuel 17.5%, mineral metallics 13%, paper 9.4%, cacao 5.6%, vehicles 4.8%, soybean 4.5% (2002). In addition to important agricultural and industrial sectors, the state also has considerable mineral and petroleum deposits. In recent years, soy cultivation has increased substantially in the state.

During the colonial and imperial periods, Bahia was a center of Brazilian sugarcane production and slave trading. In the 19th century, the Bay of All Saints was also a whaling spot, as some species of whales used the bay as a mating ground. By that time, the province was also growing cotton, coffee, and tobacco with great success. mandioc, rice, beans, and corn, saffron, oranges, mangoes, and other fruit were grown for local consumption. The arid interior was mostly used for cattle-farming, but this was ruined by a series of droughts caused in part by the custom of starting annual wildfires to improve the grass. Diamonds, gold, and amethysts were panned for in the rivers, while coal was mined on Itaparica. cacao was being farmed by the time of the First World War. It grew more than the national average, because the state was previously below the average level.

In agriculture, the state stands out in the production of cotton, cocoa, soy and tropical fruits such as coconut, papaya, mango, banana and guarana, in addition to also producing sugar cane, orange, beans and cassava, among others.

In 2017, the Northeast Region was the largest producer of coconut in the country, with 74.0% of national production. Bahia produced 351 million fruits, being the leader in the country. However, the sector has been suffering strong competition and losing market to Indonesia, the Philippines and India, the world's largest producers, who even export coconut water to Brazil. In addition to climatic problems, the low productivity of coconut palms in the Northeast Region is the result of factors related to the variety of coconut harvested and the technological level used in coastal regions. In these areas, the semi-extractive cultivation system still prevails, with low fertility and without the adoption of cultural management practices. The three states that have the largest production, Bahia, Sergipe and Ceará, present a yield three times lower than that of Pernambuco, which is in 5th place in the national production. This is because most of the coconut trees in these three states are located in coastal areas and cultivated in semi-extractivist systems.

In the production of cocoa, for a long time, Bahia led the Brazilian production. Today, it is disputing the leadership of national production with the state of Pará. In 2017 Pará obtained the leadership for the first time. In 2019, people from Pará harvested 135 thousand tons of cocoa, and Bahians harvested 130 thousand tons. Bahia's cocoa area is practically three times larger than that of Pará, but Pará's productivity is practically three times greater. Some factors that explain this are: the crops in Bahia are more extractivist, and those in Pará have a more modern and commercial style, in addition to paraenses using more productive and resistant seeds, and their region providing resistance to Witch's broom.

In 2018, the Northeast was in third place among the regions that most produce sugar cane in the country. Brazil is the world's largest producer, with 672.8 million tons harvested this year. The Northeast harvested 45.7 million tons, 6.8% of national production. Alagoas is the largest producer, with 33.3% of Northeastern production (15.2 million tons). Pernambuco is the 2nd largest producer in the Northeast, with 22.7% of the total in the region (10.3 million tons). Paraíba has 11.9% of northeastern production (5.5 million tons) and Bahia, 10.24% of production (4.7 million tons).

Bahia is the 2nd largest producer of cotton in Brazil, losing only to Mato Grosso. In 2019, it harvested 1.5 million tonnes of the product.

In soy, Brazil produced close to 120 million tons in 2019, being the largest world producer. In 2019, the Northeast produced close to 10.7 million tons, or 9% of the Brazilian total. The largest producer in the Northeast was Bahia (5.3 million tons).

In the production of maize, in 2018 Brazil was the 3rd largest producer in the world, with 82 million tons. The Northeast produced about 8.4% of the country's total. Bahia was the largest producer in the Northeast, with 2.2 million tons.

In 2018, the South Region was the main producer of beans with 26.4% of the total, followed by the Midwest (25.4%), Southeast Region (25.1%), Northeast (20.6%) and North (2.5%). The largest producers in the Northeast were Ceará and Bahia.

In cassava production, Brazil produced a total of 17.6 million tons in 2018. Maranhão was the 7th largest producer in the country, with 681 thousand tons. Ceará was 9th, with 622 thousand tons. Bahia was 10th with 610 thousand tons. In total, the northeast produced 3,5 million tons.

Bahia was the fourth largest producer of oranges in Brazil in 2018, with a total of 604 thousand tons, 3,6% of the national production.

Bahia is the second largest fruit producer in the country, with more than 3.3 million tons a year, behind São Paulo. The north of Bahia is one of the main fruit suppliers in the country. The State is one of the main national producers of ten types of fruit. In 2017, Bahia led the production of cajarana, coconut, count fruit or pinecone, soursop, umbu, jackfruit, licuri, mango and passion fruit, and is in second place in cocoa almond, atemoia, cupuaçu, lime and lemon, and third in banana, carambola, guava, papaya, watermelon, melon, cherry, pomegranate and table grapes. In all, 34 products from Bahia's fruit culture have an important participation in the national economy.

Rio Grande do Norte is the largest producer of melon in the country. In 2017 it produced 354 thousand tons. The Northeast region accounted for 95.8% of the country's production in 2007. In addition to Rio Grande do Norte, which in 2005 produced 45.4% of the country's total, the other 3 largest in the country were Ceará, Bahia and Pernambuco.

In the production of papaya, in 2018 Bahia was the 2nd largest producer state in Brazil, almost equaling with Espírito Santo: 337 thousand tons.

Bahia was the largest producer of mango in the country in 2019, with production of around 281 thousand tons per year. Juazeiro (130 thousand tons per year) and Casa Nova (54 thousand tons per year) are at the top of the list of Brazilian cities that lead the cultivation of fruit.

In the production of banana, in 2018 Bahia was the 2nd largest national producer.

Bahia is the largest Brazilian producer of guaraná. In 2017, Brazilian production was close to 3.3 million tons. Bahia harvested 2.3 million (mainly in the city of Taperoá), Amazonas 0.7 million (mainly in the city of Maués) and the rest of the country, 0.3 million. Despite the fact that the fruit originated in the Amazon, since 1989 Bahia has beaten Amazonas in terms of production volume and guarana productivity, because the soil in Bahia is more favorable, in addition to the absence of diseases in the region. The most famous users of the product, however, acquire 90% to 100% of their guarana from the Amazon region, such as Ambev and Coca-Cola. Bahian guarana prices are well below those of other states, but Sudam's tax exemptions lead the beverage industry to prefer to purchase seeds in the North, which helps maintain the highest added value of Amazonian guarana. The pharmaceutical industries and importers, on the other hand, buy more guarana from Bahia, due to the price.

The Northeast region housed 93.2% of the Brazilian goat herd (8,944,461 heads) and 64.2% of the sheep herd (11,544,939 heads) in 2017. Bahia concentrated 30.9% of the goat herd and 20.9% of the national sheep herd. Casa Nova took first place in the municipal ranking with the largest numbers of both species.

In 2017, Bahia had 1.68% of the national mineral participation (4th place in the country). Bahia had production of gold (6.2 tons at a value of R$730 million), copper (56 thousand tons, at a value of R$404 million); chrome (520 thousand tons, at a value of R$254 million) and vanadium (358 thousand tons, at a value of R$91 million).

Bahia had an industrial GDP of R$53.0 billion in 2017, equivalent to 4.4% of the national industry. It employs 356,997 workers in the industry. The main industrial sectors are: Construction (24.8%), Industrial Services of Public Utility, such as Electricity and Water (15.0%), Petroleum Derivatives and Biofuels (13.8%), Chemicals (9.4%), and Food (6.1%). These 5 sectors concentrate 69.1% of the state's industry.

Bahian industry have automobile and tyre industries, footwear and textiles, furniture, food and beverages, cosmetics and perfumes, information technology and naval sectors.

In Brazil, the automotive sector represents close to 22% of industrial GDP. Bahia has a Ford factory. It was created in Camaçari (2001). The Bahian automotive sector, led by Ford was in 2005 the third largest contributor (14.6%) to the Bahian GDP.

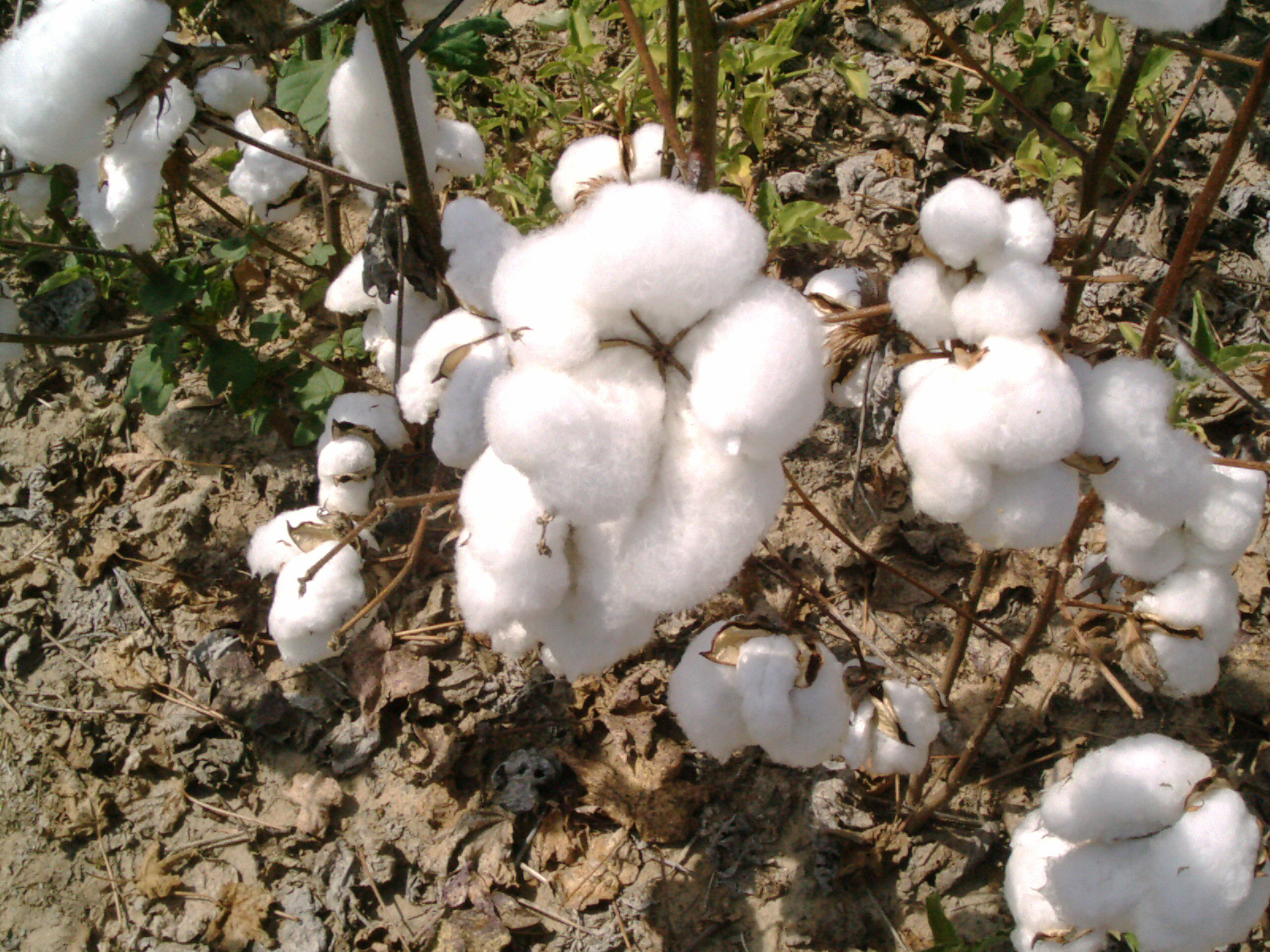
Cotton in Luís Eduardo Magalhães

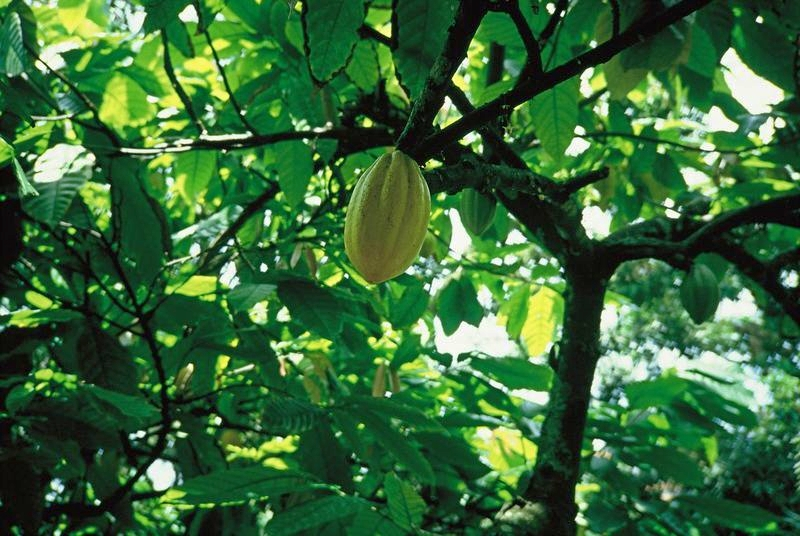
Cocoa in Ilhéus

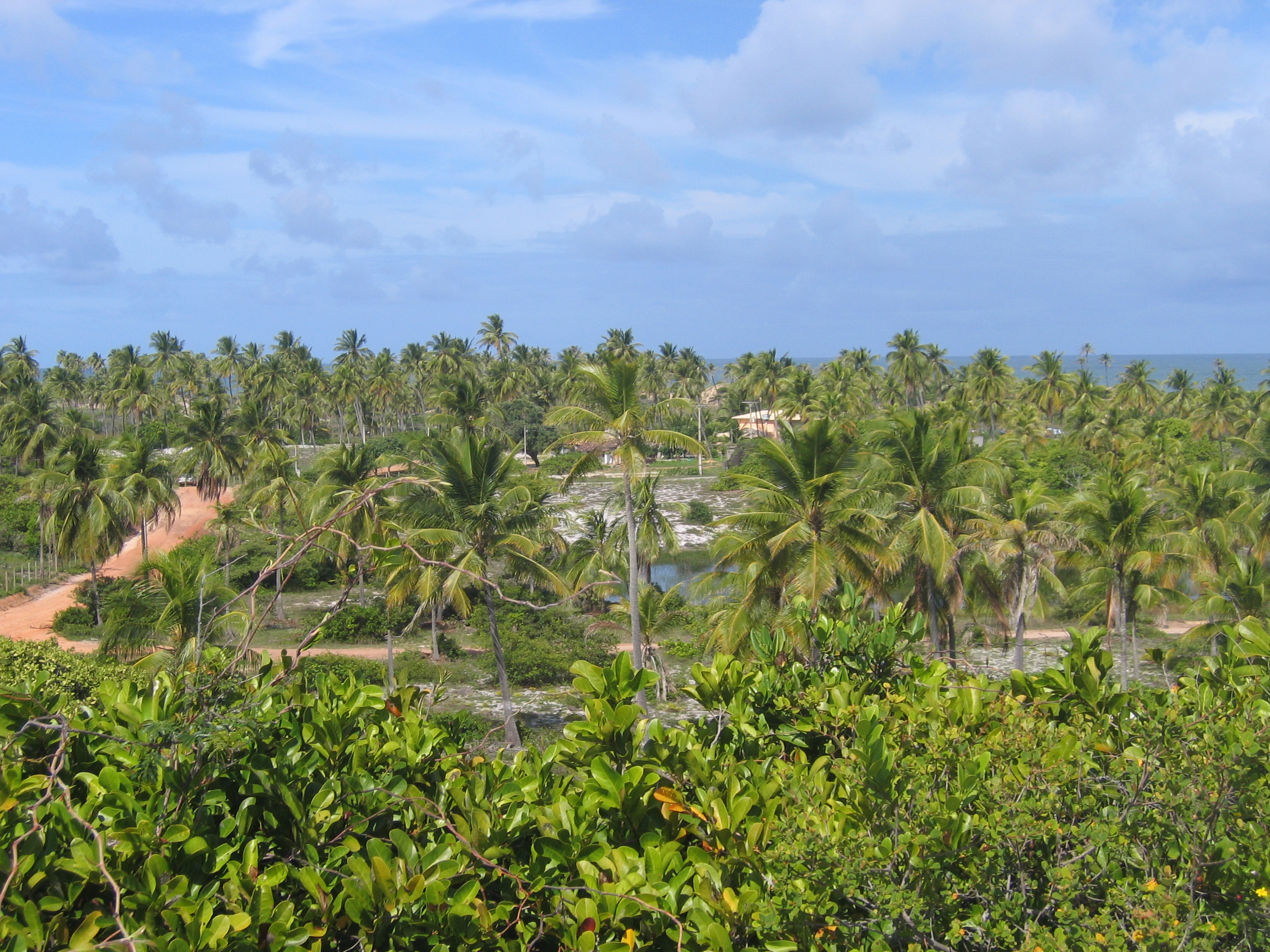
Coconut production

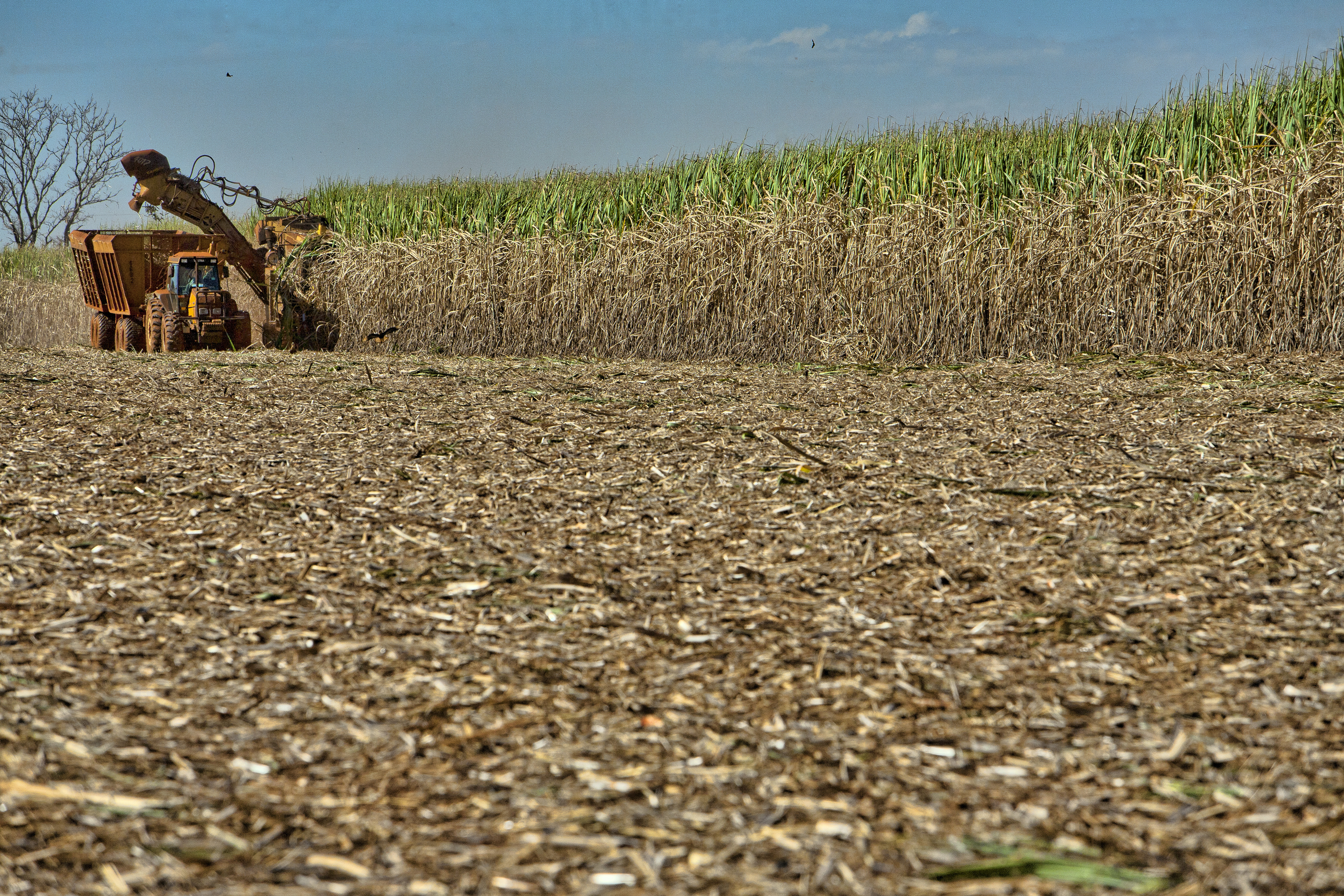
Sugarcane in Bahia

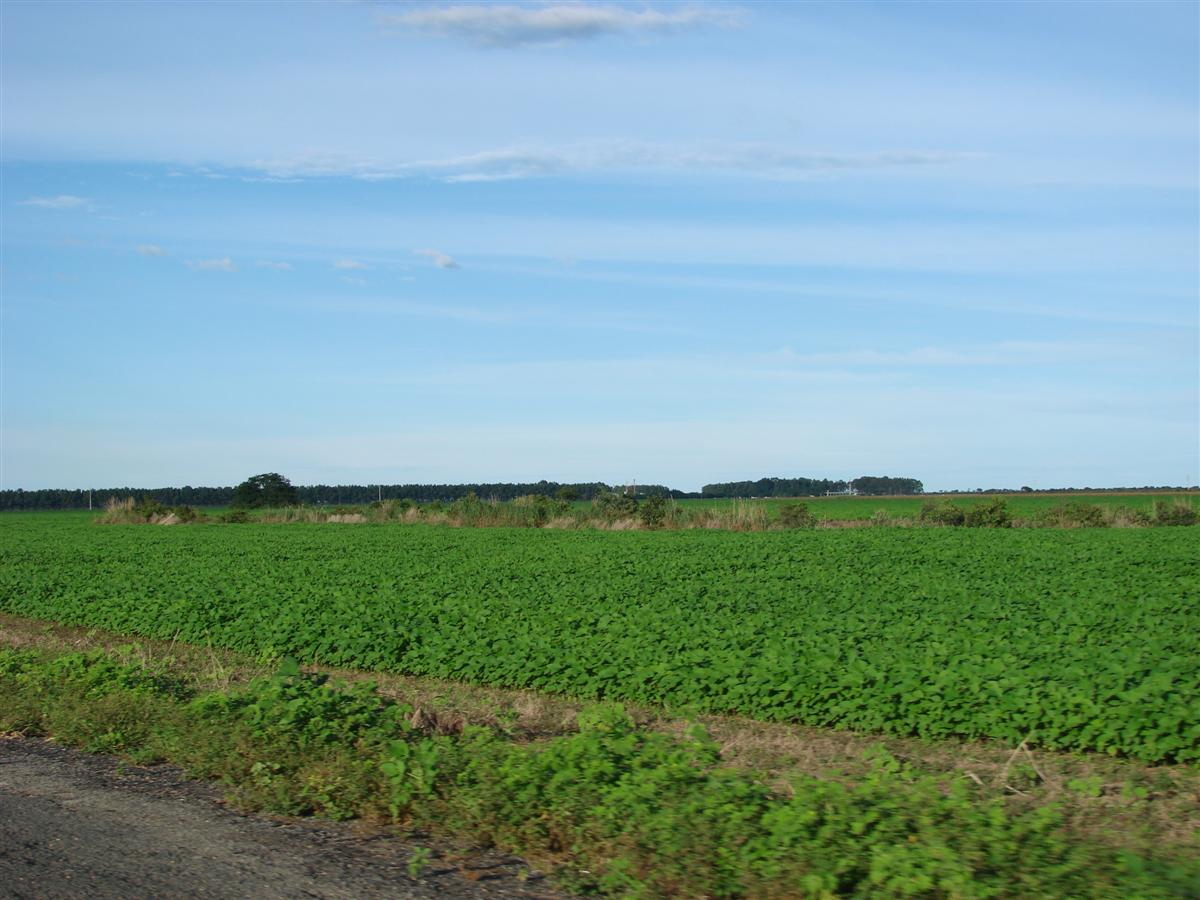
Soy plantation in Barreiras

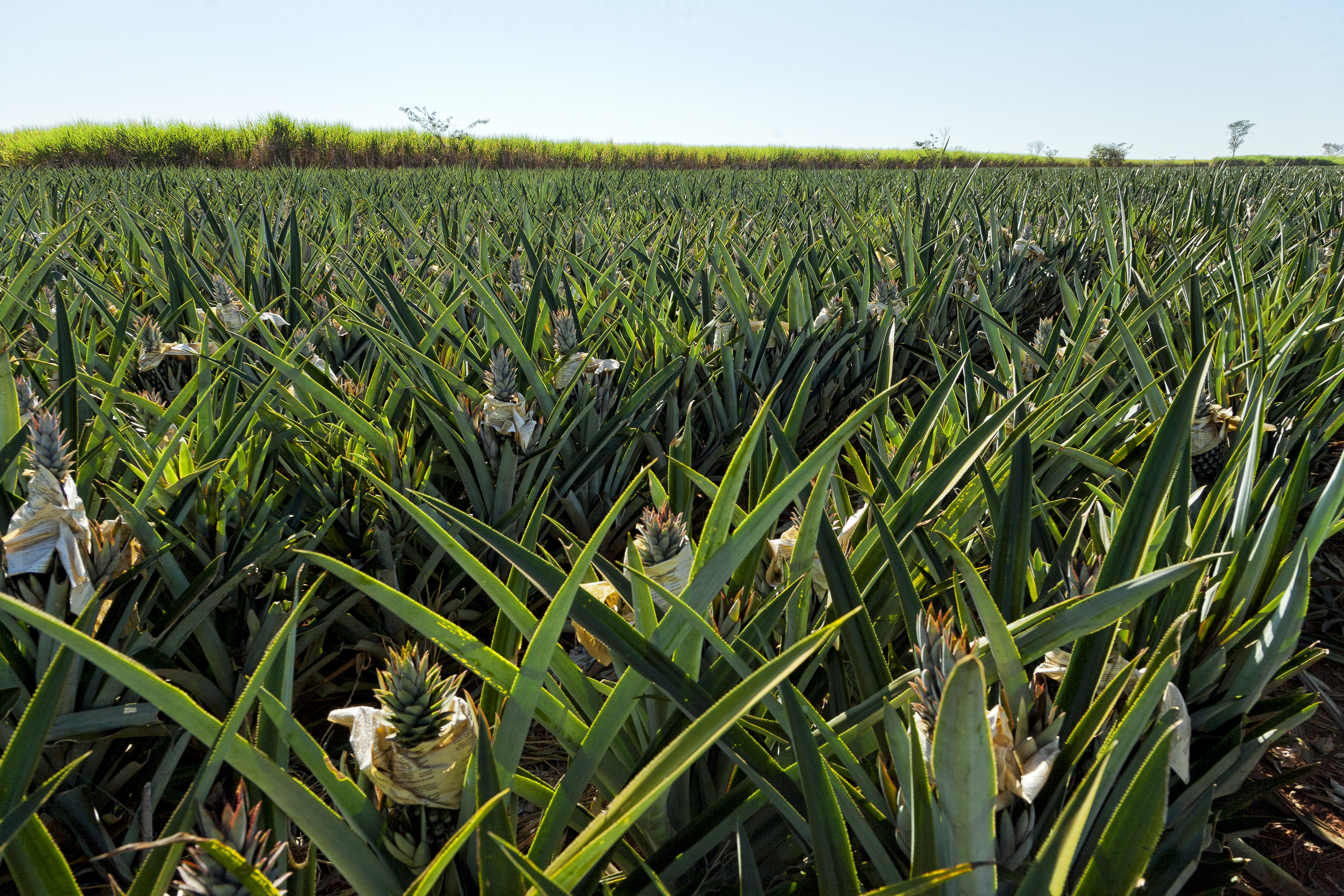
Pineapple plantation

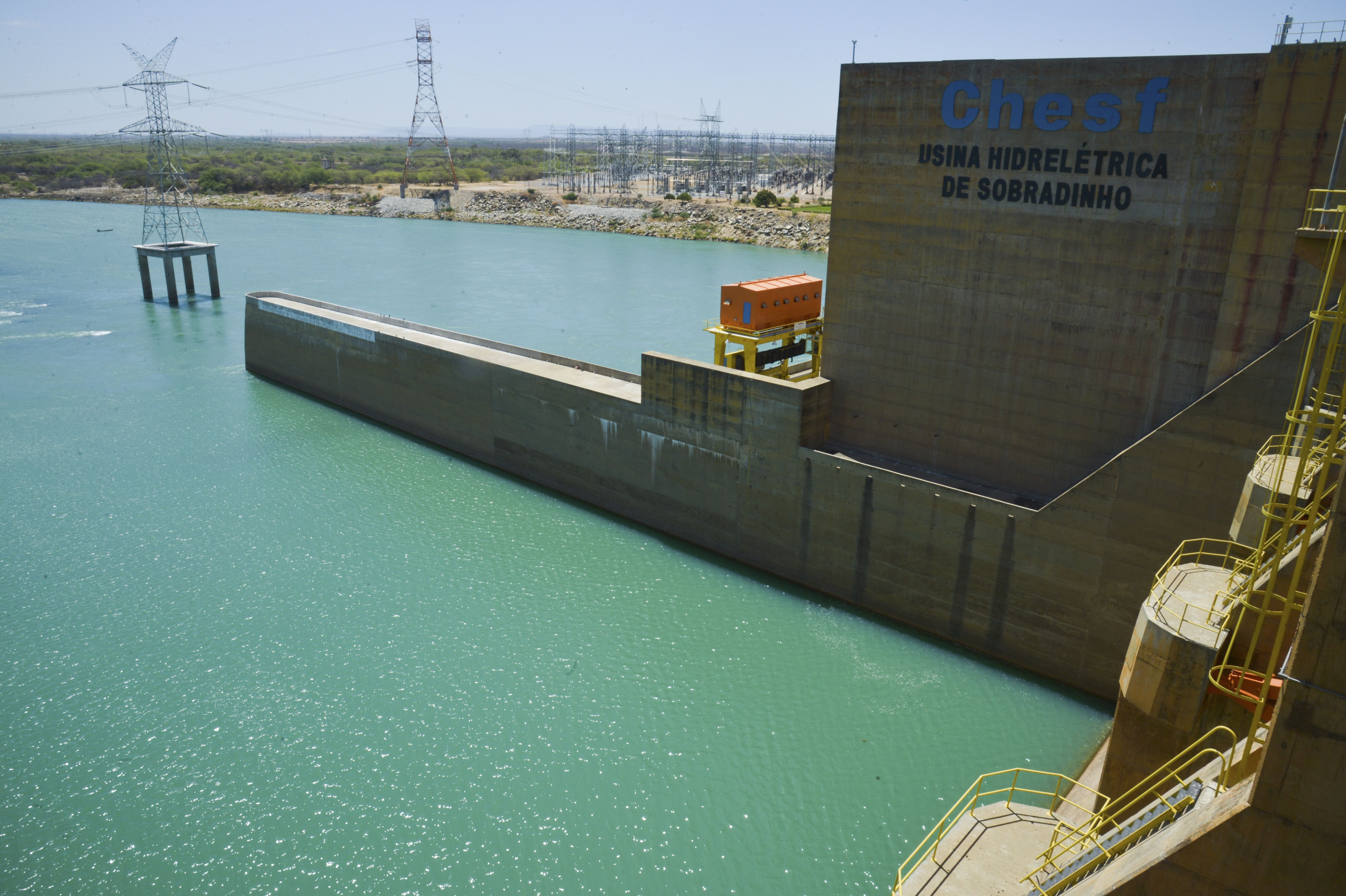
Hydroelectric power plant in Sobradinho.

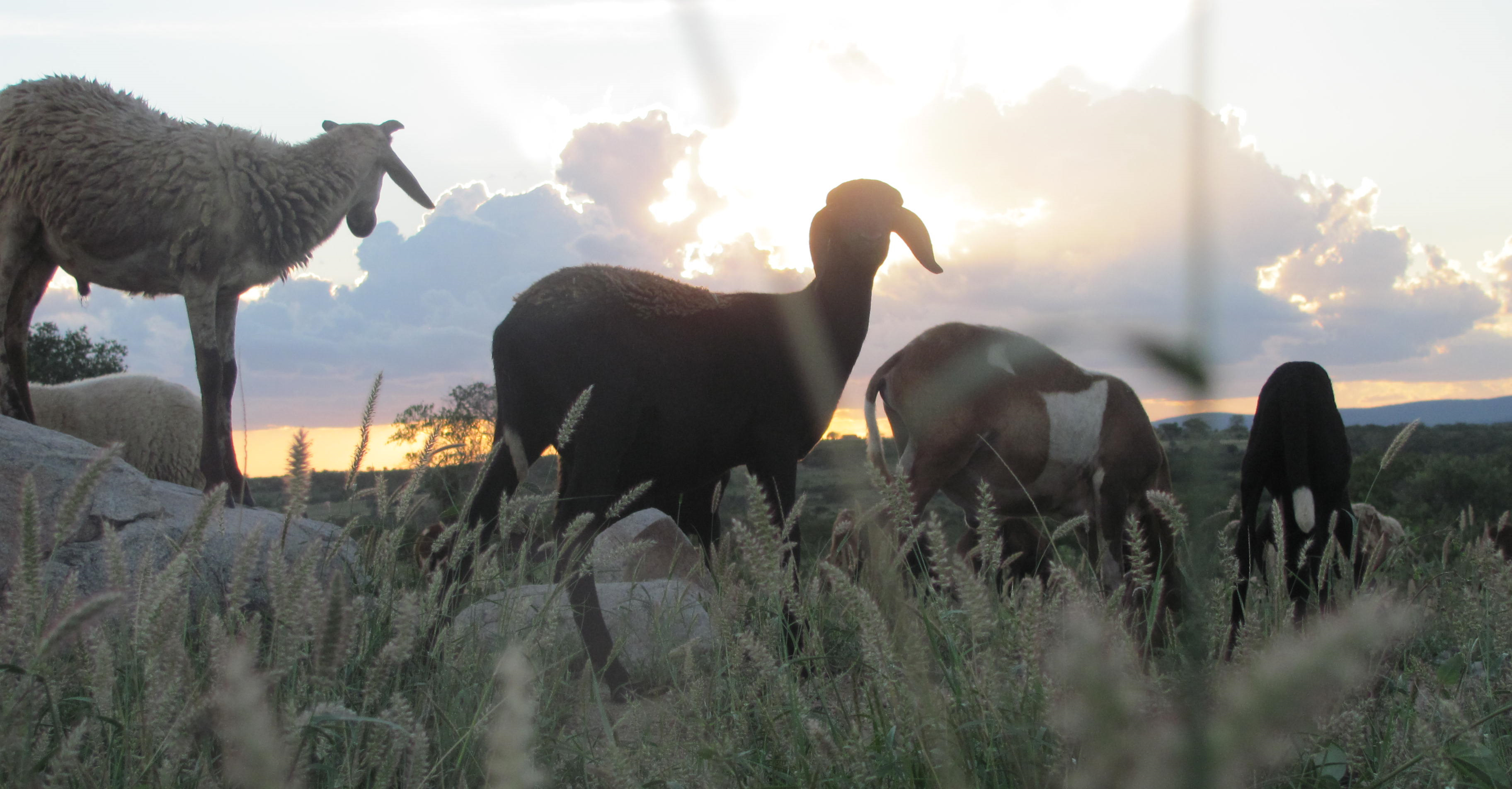
Goats in Araci

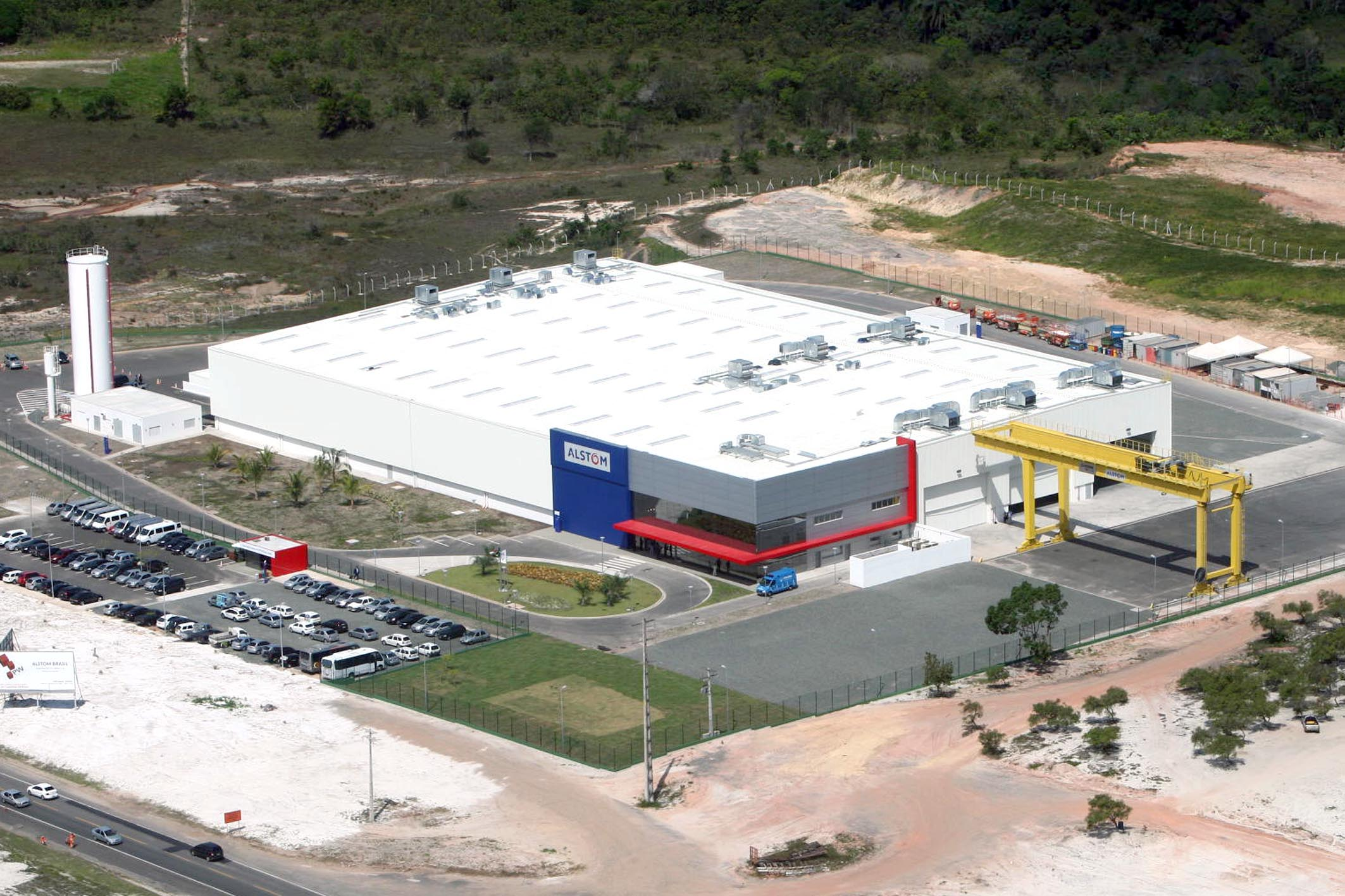
Alstom factory in Camaçari

=== Chemical and petrochemical ===
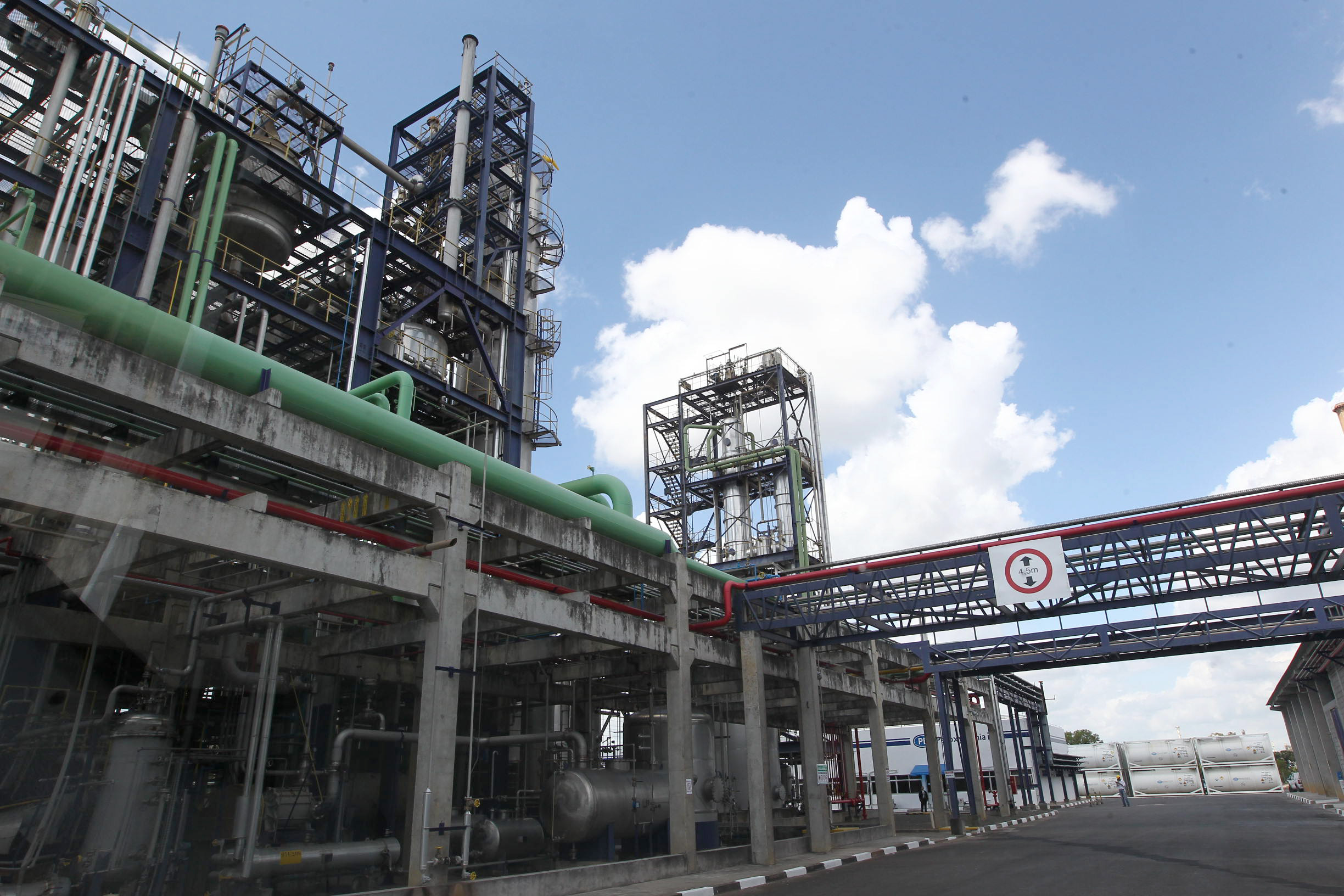
Hydrogen Unit at the Camaçari Petrochemical Complex

Bahia's Petrochemical Pole is the largest integrated complex in the Southern Hemisphere, and is the result of R$10 billion in investments, accounting for a third of the state's exports and for nearly half of the industrial production value.

==== Reconcavo Basin ====
The Reconcavo Basin has been a principal petroleum-producing region, mainly from the Upper Jurassic and Lower Cretaceous Bahia Supergroup, since 1939 and contains the Agua Grande Field (discovered in 1951 by the Conselho Nacional de Petroleo and producing from the Sergei and Candeias Formations at about 1 km depth and the shallower Ilhas Formation), the Dom Joao Field (discovered in 1947 by the Conselho Nacional de Petroleo and producing from the Sergei Formation at a depth of about 200 m), the Miranga Field (discovered in 1965 by Petrobras producing from the Ilhas Formation at a depth of about 1 km), the Candeias Field (discovered in 1941 by Conselho Nacional de Petroleo and producing from the Candeias Formation at a depth ranging from 690 to 2400 m), the Buracica Field (discovered in 1959 by Petrobras and producing from the Sergi Formation at about 600 m depth), and the Taquipe Field (discovered in 1958 by Petrobras and producing from the Ilhas Formation).

=== Other market segments ===
Agribusiness; footwear; call centers; informatics, electronics, and telecommunications; nautical; paper and pulp; textiles; plastic transformation; and tourism.

== Infrastructure ==
=== Airports ===
Deputado Luís Eduardo Magalhães International Airport is located in an area of more than 6 million square meters (1,500 acres). It lies 20 km (12 mi) north of downtown Salvador. In 2007, the airport handled 5,920,573 passengers and 91,043 aircraft movements, making it the fifth busiest airport in Brazil in terms of passengers. It's responsible for more than 30% of passenger movement in northeastern Brazil. Nearly 35,000 people circulate daily through the passenger terminal. The airport generates more than 16,000 direct and indirect jobs, to serve a daily average of over 10,000 passengers, 250 takeoffs and landings of 100 domestic and 16 international flights.

The international airlines are Lufthansa, TAP, United Airlines, American Airlines, Alitália, Air France, Air Europa, Ibéria, Aerolíneas Argentinas, LanChile. In addition to domestic and regional services, the airport has non-stop flights to Lisbon, Madrid, Frankfurt, Montevideo, London, Santiago, Buenos Aires, Asunción and Miami. Its IATA airport code is SSA and it is the sixth busiest airport in the country, the first in northeastern Brazil, behind Congonhas International, Guarulhos International, Juscelino Kubitschek International, Santos Dumont Regional and Galeão International.

Bahia also has some smaller modern regional airports including Ilhéus Jorge Amado Airport and Porto Seguro Airport.

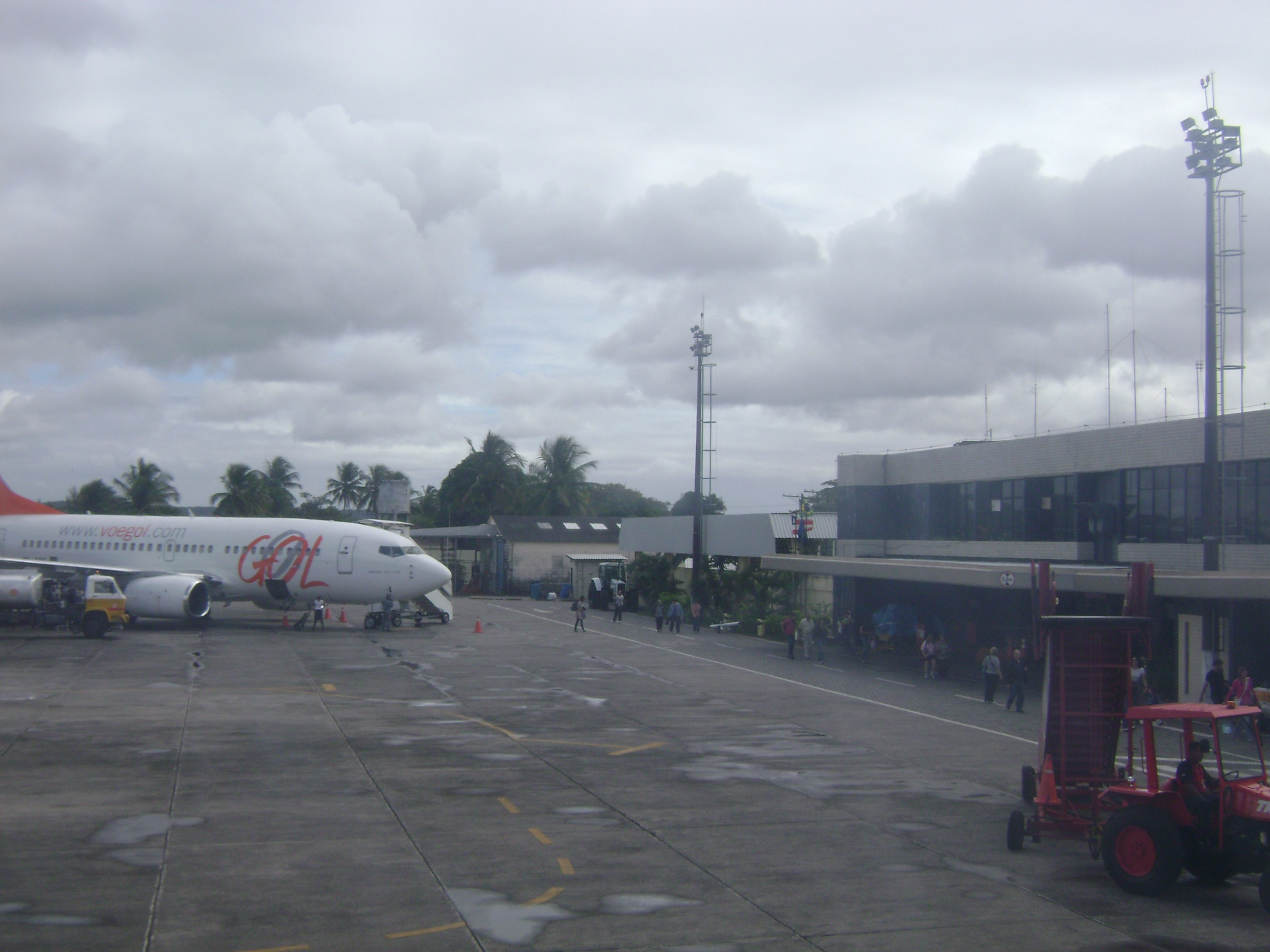
Airport of Ilhéus

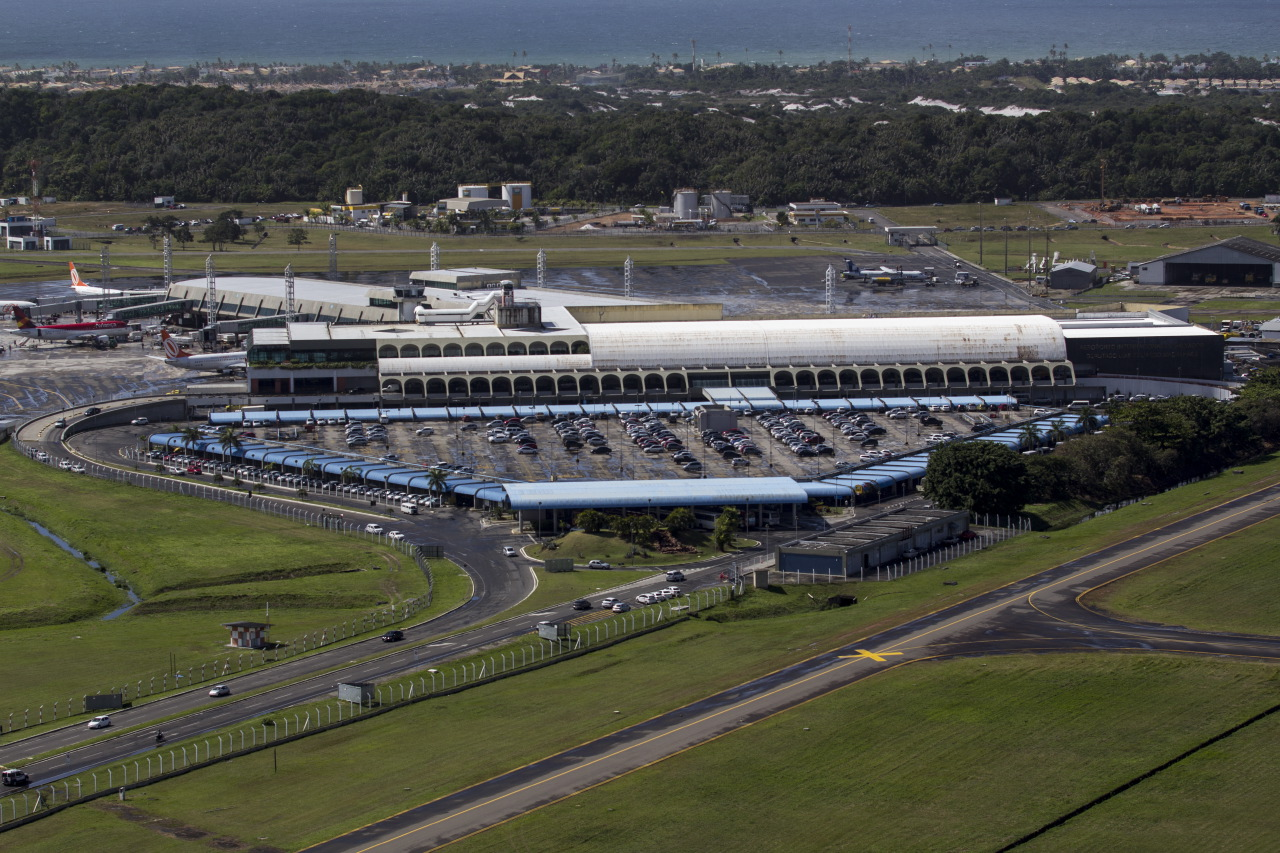
Deputado Luís Eduardo Magalhães International Airport (SSA)

=== Highways ===
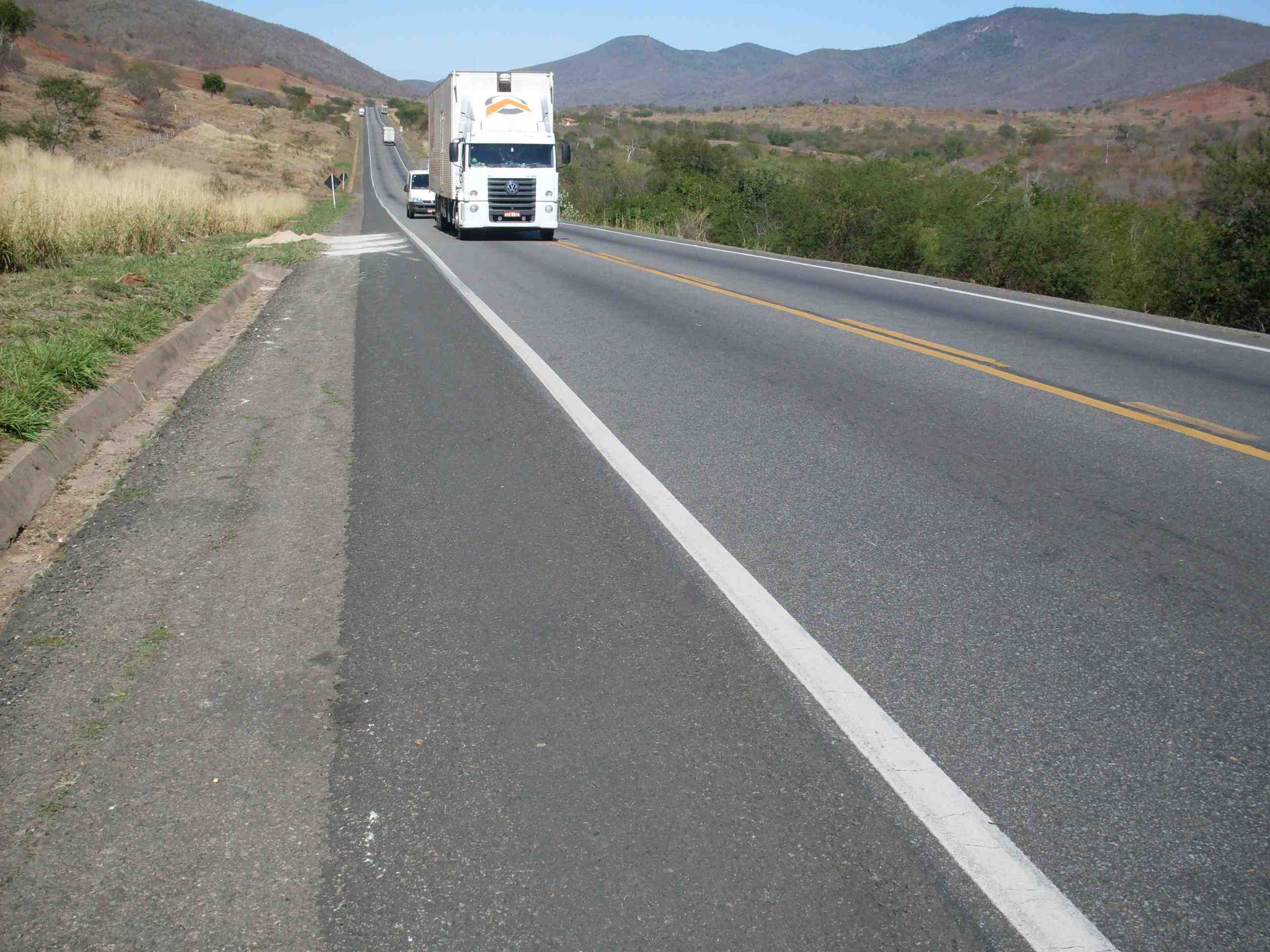
BR-101 highway in Bahia

The state has its transportation based on highways, with few options in other sectors. The main highways in the state are all from the Federal Government:

- BR-101 – It borders the state coast, connecting it with the country's richest region (Southeast) and with the rest of the Northeast. It passes through the cocoa producing area of the state, in the cities of Itabuna and Ilhéus, reaching the capital Salvador and from there to Aracaju, capital of Sergipe.
- BR-116 – also crosses the state from north to south, parallel to BR 101 but passing further inland. It cuts through some of the important cities of the state, such as Vitória da Conquista, Jequié, Feira de Santana and Euclides da Cunha, going towards the interior of Pernambuco and Fortaleza, capital of Ceará.
- BR-242 – the highway cuts the state in half in an east–west direction, connecting Salvador to Brasília, the country's capital. It passes through important cities like Lençóis, Barreiras and Luís Eduardo Magalhães.
- BR-407 – together with BR-324, the highway connects the region of Bahia, which is the largest producer of fruit and the largest breeder of sheep and goats, in the cities of Juazeiro and Casa Nova, to Feira de Santana, Salvador and southeastern Brazil. The BR-235 borders the North of the state, connecting these same regions to the coast of Bahia.
- BR-110 – crossing the interior of the Northeast Region, this highway connects Salvador with the hydroelectric plant of Paulo Afonso and reaches Mossoró, in Rio Grande do Norte

Also noteworthy is the BR-030, which crosses the south of Bahia in an east–west direction.

=== Ports ===
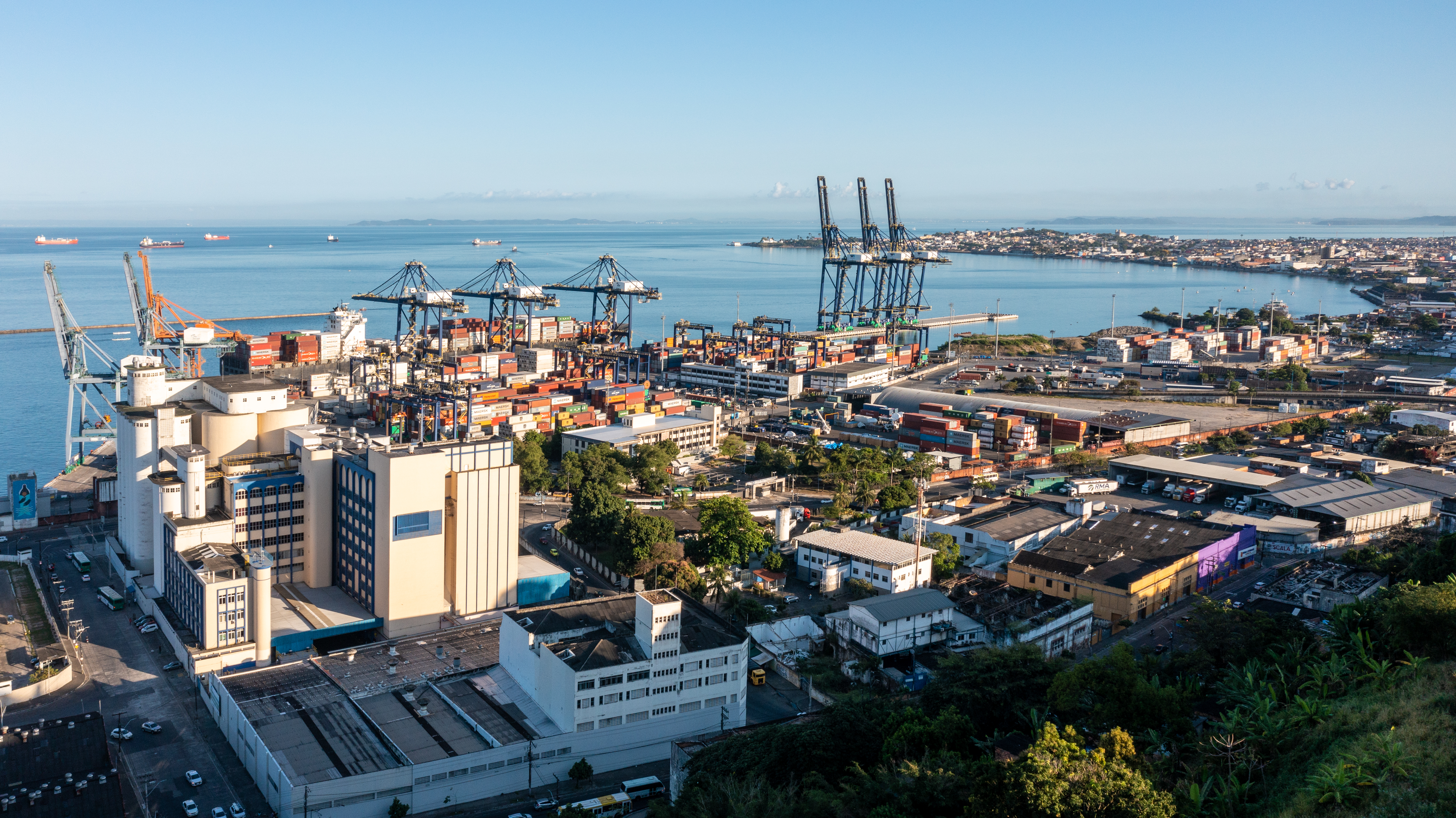
Port of Salvador

With cargo volume that grows year after year following the same economic development rhythm implemented in the State, the Port of Salvador, located on the Bay of All Saints, holds status as the port with the highest movement of containers of the North/Northeast and the second-leading fruit exporter in Brazil. The port's facilities operate from 8 a.m. to noon and from 1:30 a.m. to 5:30 p.m.

The ability to handle high shipping volume has positioned the port of Salvador for new investments in technological modernization, and the port is noted for implementing a high level of operational flexibility and competitive rates. The goal of port officials is to offer the necessary infrastructure for the movement of goods, while simultaneously meeting the needs of international importers and exporters.

== Sports ==
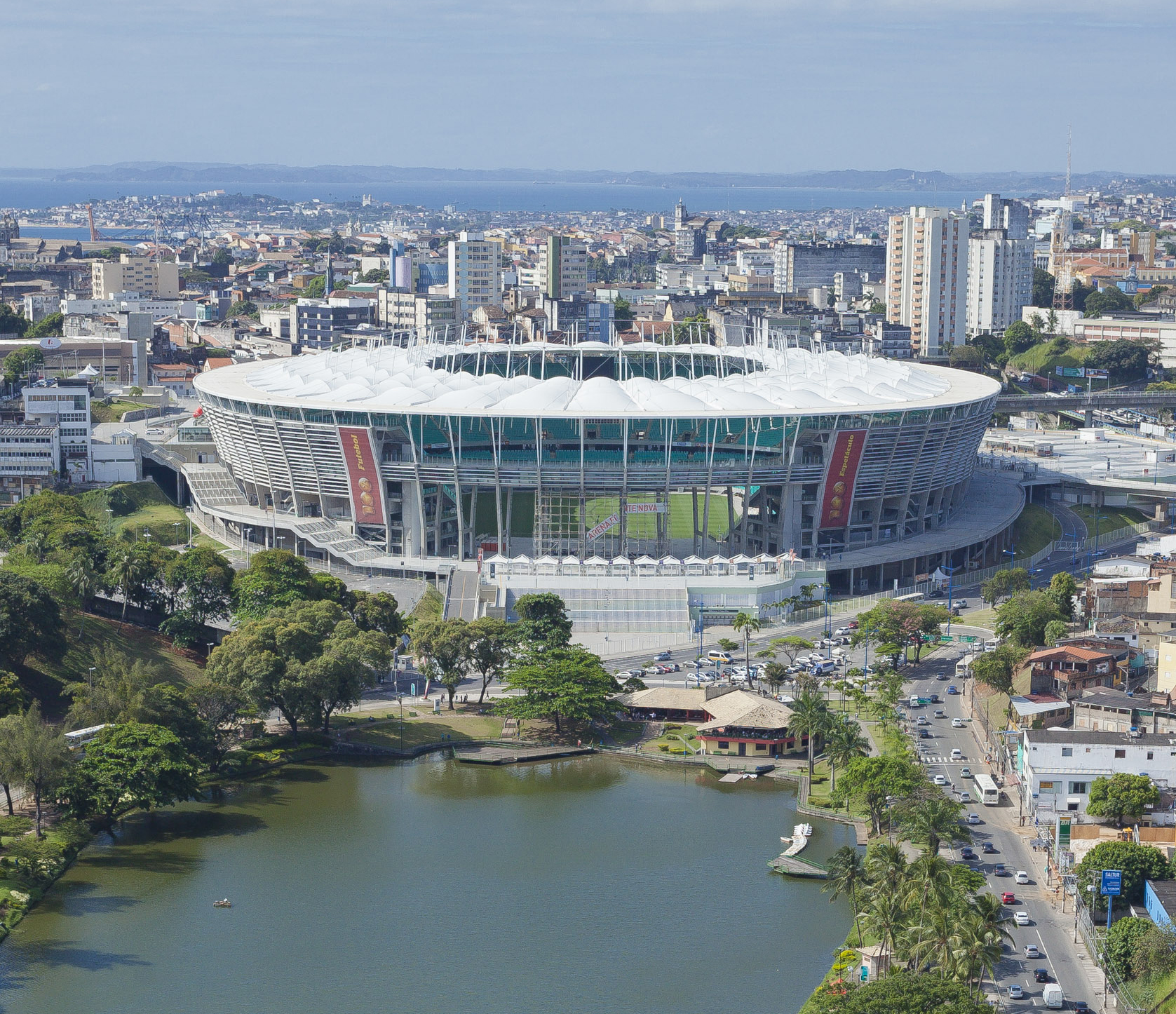
Itaipava Arena Fonte Nova, view from lake

Football is the most popular sport. The two most popular football teams are EC Bahia and EC Vitória, in the Campeonato Brasileiro Série A (first division). EC Bahia has won two league titles in 1959 and 1988. EC Vitória was runner up of the Série A in 1993 and champion of the Série B (second division) in 2023.

Bahia is renowned for its mixed martial arts fans, with prominent fighters from this state including former heavyweight champion of both Pride Fighting Championship and Ultimate Fighting Championship Antônio Rodrigo Nogueira, his twin brother Antônio Rogério Nogueira, and former Ultimate Fighting Championship Heavyweight Champion Junior dos Santos. In the sport of boxing, Bahian native Acelino Freitas has won the WBC belt in the lightweight class. In the Capoeira world, the actor and Capoeira Master, Lateef Crowder dos Santos is an American born in Salvador, Bahia.

Salvador was one of the host cities of the 2014 FIFA World Cup, for which Brazil was the host nation.

== Flag ==
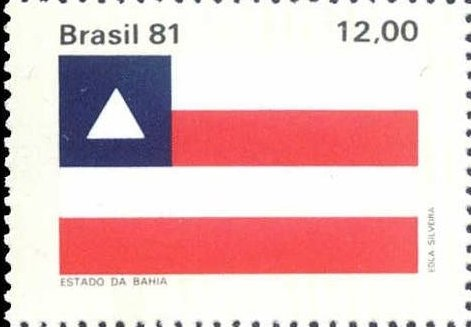
Brazilian stamp from 1981 depicting the flag of Bahia

The flag was officially adopted on 11 June 1960. The Bahian flag is influenced by the flag of the United States, as well as colors and symbolism from the 1789 separatist movement Inconfidência Mineira and the 1798 Bahian slave rebellion called the Revolt of the Tailors.

== See also ==
- Independence of Bahia
- Captaincy of Bahia
- List of municipalities in Bahia
