= 2022 Bahia general election =

Gubernatorial election held in Brazil

2022 Bahia state election
- 2 October 2022 (first round); 30 October 2022 (second round)
- Opinion polls
- Turnout: 78.65% (first round)
- Gubernatorial election
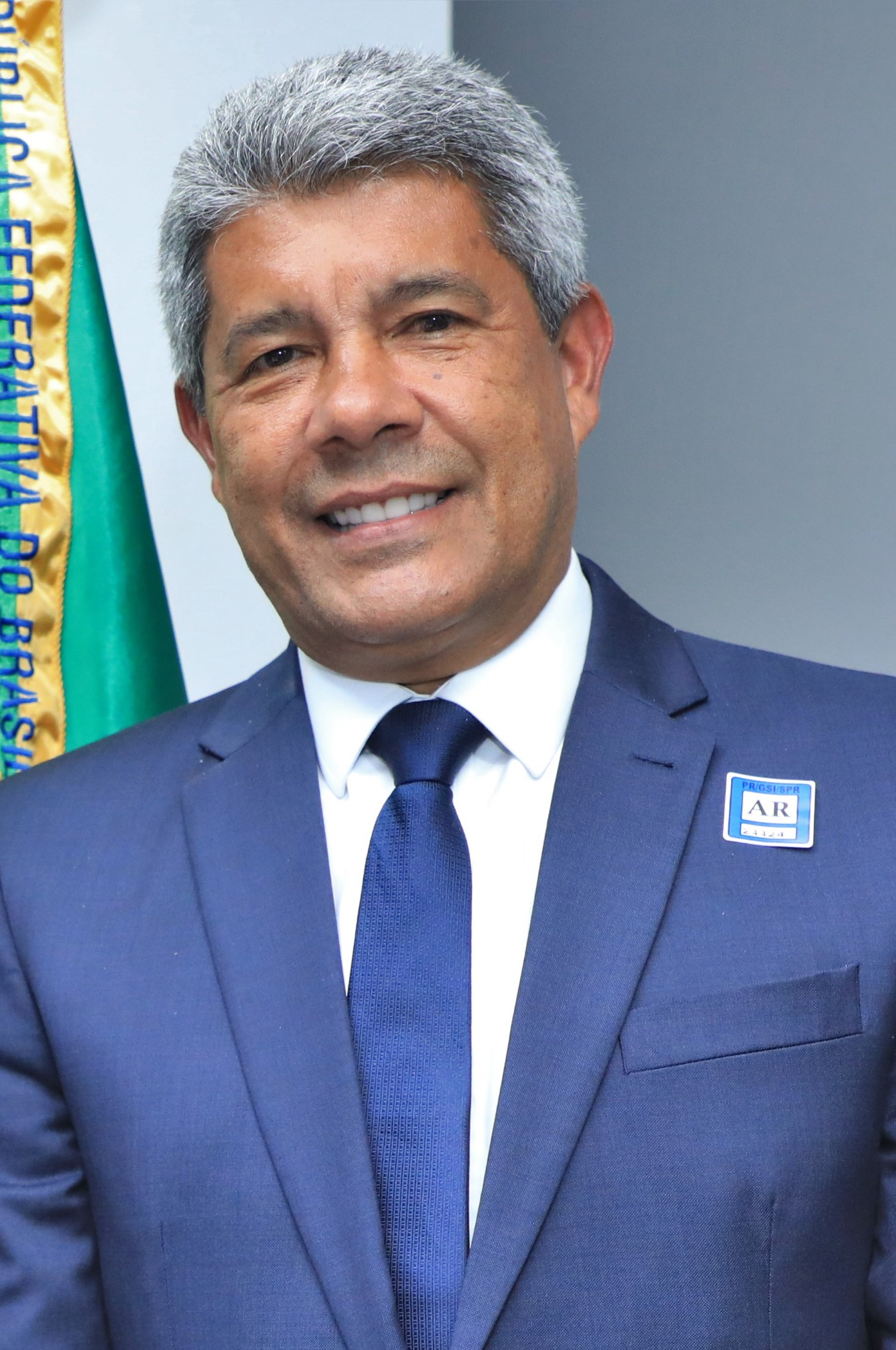

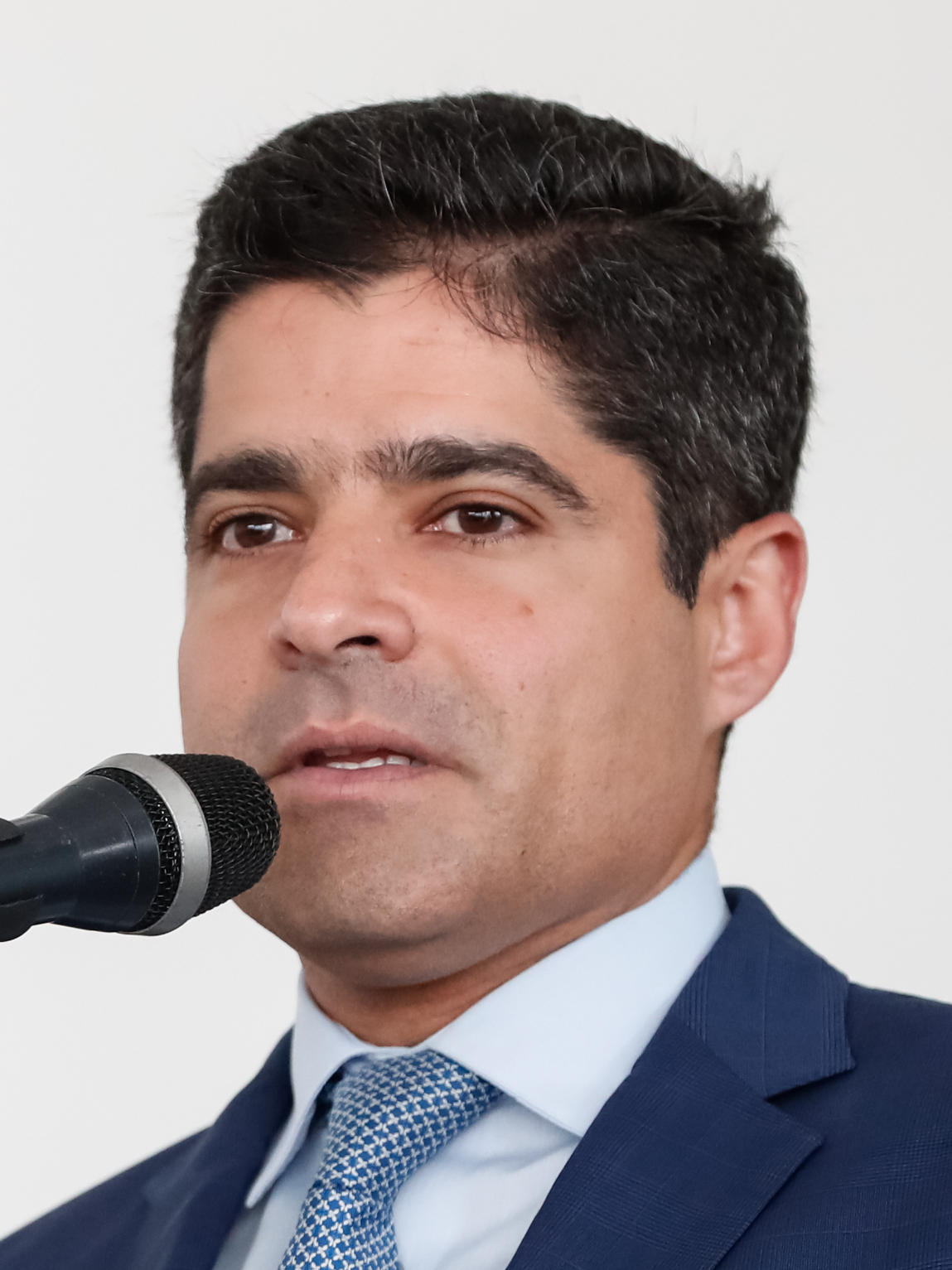
Candidate	Jerônimo Rodrigues	ACM Neto
Party	PT	UNIÃO
Alliance	For Bahia, for Brazil	To Change Bahia
Running mate	Geraldo Júnior	Ana Coelho
Popular vote	4,480,464	4,007,023
Percentage	52.79%	47.21%
- Candidate most voted in each municipality in the 2nd round (417): Jerônimo Rodrigues (364) ACM Neto (53)
Governor before election
Rui Costa
PT
Elected Governor
Jerônimo Rodrigues
PT
- Parliamentary election
- All 63 seats of the Legislative Assembly
Party	Vote %	Seats	+/–
Legislative Assembly
UNIÃO	14.51%	10	+1
PT	15.36%	9	−1
PSD	13.98%	9	0
PP	9.05%	6	−1
PL	5.91%	4	+3
Republicanos	5.05%	3	+2
PSDB	4.70%	3	0
PCdoB	4.22%	4	−1
PV	1.57%	4	+4
PSB	3.92%	2	−2
Solidarity	3.45%	2	+2
MDB	3.11%	2	+1
PDT	2.80%	1	−2
PSC	2.46%	1	−2
PSOL	1.86%	1	0
This lists parties that won seats. See the complete results below.
- Senatorial election
- 2 October 2022 (one-only round)
- Opinion polls
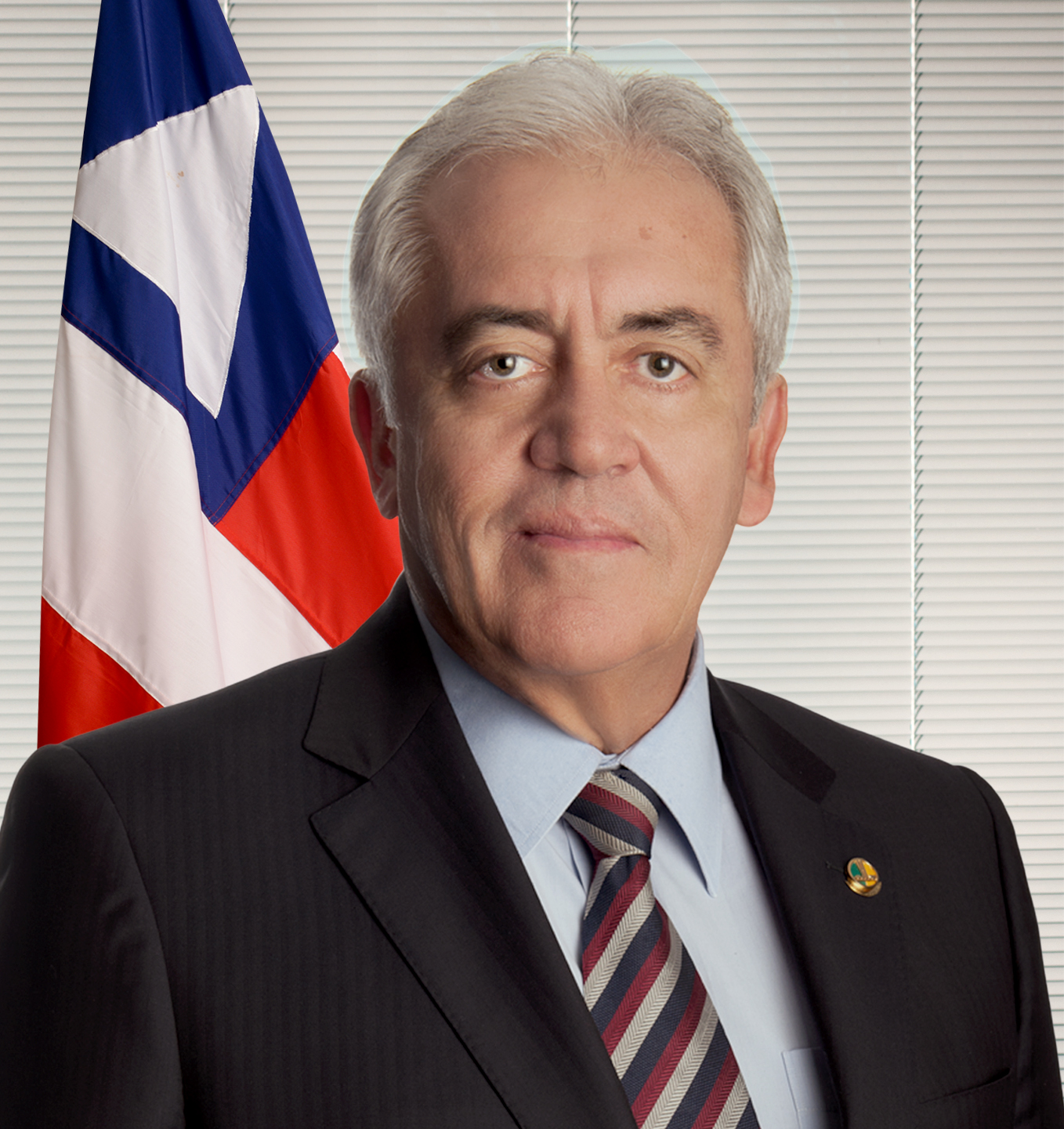

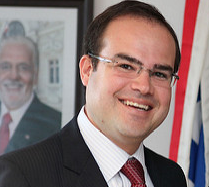
Candidate	Otto Alencar	Cacá Leão
Party	PSD	Progressistas
Alliance	Bahia and Brazil	To Change Bahia
Popular vote	4,218,333	1,826,218
Percentage	58.31%	25.24%
- Candidate most voted in each municipality in the 2nd round (417): Otto Alencar (382) Cacá Leão (31) Raíssa Soares (4)
Senator before election
Otto Alencar
PSD
Elected Senator
Otto Alencar
PSD

The 2022 Bahia state election took place in the state of Bahia, Brazil on 2 October 2022. The elections saw voters choose a Governor and Vice Governor, one Senator, 39 representatives for the Chamber of Deputies, and 63 Legislative Assembly members. The incumbent Governor, Rui Costa, of the Workers' Party (PT), was not eligible for a third term since he ran for governor in 2014 and 2018. In a significant upset, PT nominee and Secretary of Education Jerônimo led Mayor of Salvador ACM Neto in the first round of elections despite the vast majority of registered opinion polls indicating the leadership or even outright victory of Neto. In the end, Jerônimo obtained 49.45% of valid votes to ACM's 40.8%; less than a percentage point within of winning the election in the first round. Nevertheless, as no candidate obtained a majority of the vote, there will be a second round election on October 30 2022.

In the election for Federal Senate from the state of Bahia, incumbent Senator Otto Alencar (PSD) whose seat was up for election ran for re-election. and was successfully re-elected with 58.3% of valid votes.

== Electoral calendar ==
Note: This section only presents the main dates of the 2022 electoral calendar, check the TSE official website (in Portuguese) and other official sources for detailed information.<

Electoral calendar
May 15	Start of crowdfunding of candidates
July 20 to August 5	Party conventions for choosing candidates and coalitions
August 16 to September 30	Period of exhibition of free electoral propaganda on radio, television and on the internet related to the first round
October 2	First round of 2022 elections
October 7 to October 28	Period of exhibition of free electoral propaganda on radio, television and on the internet related to a possible second round
October 30	Possible second round of 2022 elections
until December 19	Delivery of electoral diplomas for those who were elected in the 2022 elections by the Brazilian Election Justice

== Gubernatorial candidates ==
Political parties have until August 15, 2022 to formally register their candidates.

=== Candidates in Runoff ===
Party	Candidate	Most relevant political office or occupation	Party	Running mate	Coalition	Electoral number	Ref.
Brazil Union (UNIÃO)	ACM Neto	Mayor of Salvador (2013–2021)	Republicans	Ana Coelho	To Change Bahia: Brazil Union (UNIÃO); Republicans; Progressistas (PP); Always Forward; Brazilian Social Democracy Party (PSDB); Cidadania; Social Christian Party (PSC); Brazilian Labour Party (PTB); Democratic Labour Party (PDT); Podemos (PODE); Brazilian Labour Renewal Party (PRTB); Solidariedade; Party of National Mobilization (PMN); Christian Democracy (DC)	44	
Workers' Party (PT)	Jerônimo	Secretary of Education of the State of Bahia (2019–2022)	Brazilian Democratic Movement (MDB)	Geraldo Júnior	For Bahia, for Brazil: Brazil of Hope; Workers' Party (PT); Communist Party of Brazil (PCdoB); Green Party (PV); Social Democratic Party (PSD); Brazilian Socialist Party (PSB); Avante; Brazilian Democratic Movement (MDB)	13	

=== Candidates failing to make Runoff ===
Socialism and Liberty Party (PSOL)	Kleber Rosa	Teacher.	Socialism and Liberty Party (PSOL)	Ronaldo Mansur	Let's Govern Together: PSOL REDE Federation; Popular Unity (UP)	50
Liberal Party (PL)	João Roma	Minister of Citizenship (2021–2022)	Brazilian Woman's Party (PMB)	Leonídia Umbelina	Bahia, Hand in Hand with Brazil: Liberal Party (PL); Brazilian Woman's Party (PMB); Patriota; Act (AGIR); Republican Party of the Social Order (PROS)	22
Brazilian Communist Party (PCB)	Giovani Damico	Teacher.	Brazilian Communist Party (PCB)	João Coimbra	None.	21
' Workers' Cause Party (PCO)	Marcelo Millet	App driver.	' Workers' Cause Party (PCO)	Roque Vieira Jr.	None.	29

== Senatorial candidates ==
Political parties have until August 15, 2022 to formally register their candidates.

=== Potential candidates ===
Party	Candidate	Most recent political office	Details	Ref.
Social Democratic Party (PSD)	Otto Alencar	Senator for Bahia (since 2015)	Born in Ruy Barbosa, Bahia in 1947. Teacher, medical doctor, former Governor of Bahia (2002-2003) and Vice Governor of Bahia for two periods (1999–2002) and (2011–2015) .	
Progressistas (PP)	Cacá Leão	Federal Deputy from Bahia (since 2015)	Born in Salvador, Bahia in 1979. Businessman and former state deputy of Bahia (2011–2014).	
Liberal Party (PL)	Raíssa Soares	Health Secretary of Porto Seguro (2021)	Born in Belo Horizonte, Minas Gerais in 1970. Medical doctor and Former Health Secretary of Porto Seguro (2021).	
Socialism and Liberty Party (PSOL)	Tâmara Azevedo; Professor Max; Zen Costa (group candidacy)	No prior public office	Tâmara: Sociologist. José Ademaques dos Santos (Professor Max): Geographer and physical education teacher Zen Costa: environment and culture activist.	
Party of National Mobilization (PMN)	Marcelo Barreto Luz Para Todos	No prior public office	Born in Salvador, Bahia in 1966. Administrator	

=== Withdrawn candidates ===
- João Leão (PP) - Vice Governor of Bahia since 2015; Federal Deputy from Bahia 1995–2015 and Mayor of Lauro de Freitas 1989–93. The Vice-Governor of Bahia said that the reason he gave up running for the Federal Senate is due to his advanced age and the difficulty in keeping up with the pace of the candidate for the government of Bahia, ACM Neto.
- José Ronaldo (Brazil Union) - Former Mayor of Feira de Santana, former Federal Deputy, and candidate for governor of Bahia in 2018. He decided to coordinate ACM Neto's campaign for governor instead, supporting the coalition candidate Cacá Leão.
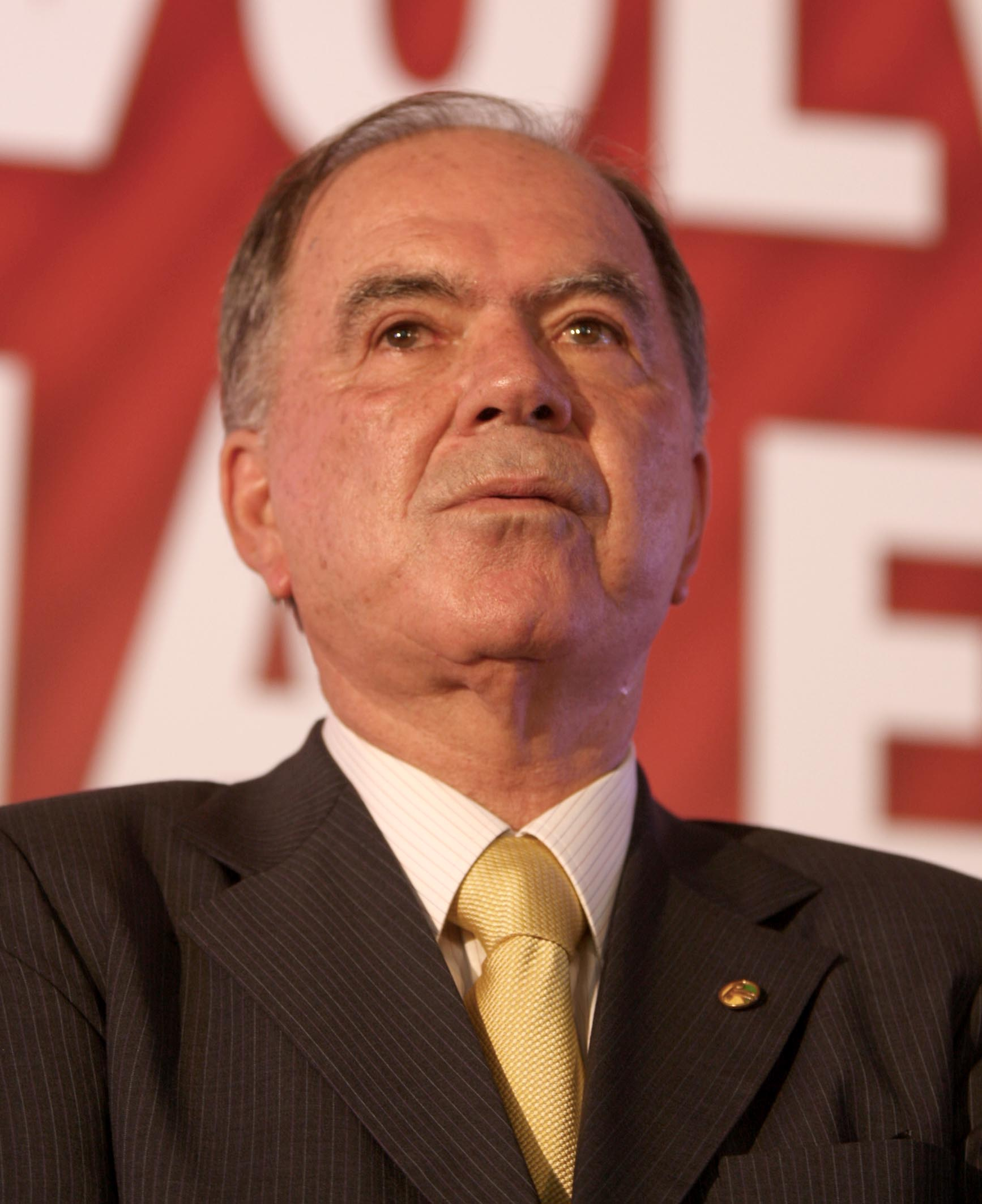
Vice Governor
of Bahia
João Leão (PP)

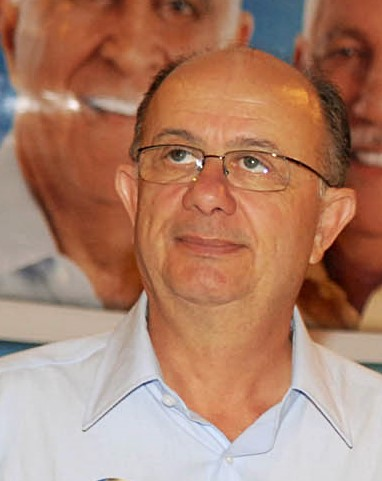
Mayor of
Feira de Santana
José Ronaldo de Carvalho

== Legislative Assembly ==
The result of the last state election and the current situation in the Legislative Assembly of Bahia is given below:

Affiliation	Members		+/–
Affiliation	Elected	Current	+/–
PT	10	13	▲3
UNIÃO	New	12	▲12
PSD	9	7	▼2
PP	7	6	▼1
PCdoB	5	4	▼1
PSB	4	4	Steady
PV	0	4	▲4
Republicanos	2	4	▲2
PDT	3	2	▼1
PSDB	3	2	▼1
PL	1	1	Steady
Patriota	1	1	Steady
PSOL	1	1	Steady
Avante	1	1	Steady
PSC	3	1	▼2
PODE	1	0	▼1
MDB	1	0	▼1
PRP	1	0	▼1
PHS	1	0	▼1
PSL	2	0	▼2
DEM	7	0	▼7
Total	63		–

== Opinion polls ==
=== First round ===
The first round is scheduled to take place on 2 October 2022.

2022

Pollster/client(s)	Date(s) conducted	Sample size	Neto UNIÃO	Jerônimo PT	Roma PL	Rosa PSOL	Damico PCB	Millet PCO	Abst. Undec	Lead
Paraná Pesquisas	14-18 Sep 2022	1,540	51.2%	24.2%	10.4%	1%	0,4%	1%	11.8%	27%
DataFolha/Metrópole	12–14 Sep 2022	1,212	49%	28%	7%	1%	1%	1%	14%	21%
Paraná Pesquisas	1-5 Sep 2022	1,540	52.9%	20.5%	11.6%	0.8%	0.6%	1%	12.7%	32.4%
Real Big Time Data	2-3 Sep 2022	1,200	49%	24%	9%	–	–	–	18%	25%
IPEC/TV Bahia	23-25 Aug 2022	1,008	56%	16%	8%	1%	–	2%	20%	43%
DataFolha/Metrópole	22-24 Aug 2022	1,008	54%	16%	8%	–	1%	1%	20%	38%
Paraná Pesquisas	11-15 Aug 2022	1,640	53.5%	18.2%	11.1%	0.2%	0.4%	0.9%	15.7%	35.3%
9 August 2022		The Workers' Cause Party launches Marcelo Millet as candidate for Bahia State Government in 2022.								
Pollster/client(s)	Date(s) conducted	Sample size	Neto UNIÃO	Jerônimo PT	Roma PL	Rosa PSOL	Damico PCB	Others	Abst. Undec	Lead
AtlasIntel/A Tarde	30 Jul–4 Aug 2022	1,600	38.8%	37.8%	13.2%	1.4%	0.1%	–	8.6%	1%
Instituto França de Pesquisas	18–28 Jul 2022	1,213	53.72%	12.78%	8.47%	0.07%	1.07%	–	23.89%	40.94%
Instituto França de Pesquisas	18–28 Jul 2022	1,213	44.95%	23.86%	13.89%	–	–	(Note: Possible electoral scenario in which the presidential candidate Lula (PT) supports Jerônimo (PT) for the government of Bahia and Jair Bolsonaro (PL) supports João Roma (PL) candidacy. In this scenario, ACM Neto (UNIÃO) has a candidacy independent of supports.)	17.3%	21.09%
Séculus	23–26 Jul 2022	1,526	60.94%	13.04%	7.86%	–	–	–	18.16%	47.8%
Quaest/Genial	9–12 Jul 2022	1,140	61%	11%	6%	1%	0%	–	21%	50%
Quaest/Genial	9–12 Jul 2022	1,140	65%	13%	–	2%	–	–	19%	52%
Quaest/Genial	9–12 Jul 2022	1,140	63%	12%	7%	–	–	–	18%	51%
Quaest/Genial	9–12 Jul 2022	1,140	43%	38%	11%	–	–	(Note: Possible electoral scenario in which the presidential candidate Lula (PT) supports Jerônimo (PT) for the government of Bahia and Jair Bolsonaro (PL) supports João Roma (PL) candidacy. In this scenario, ACM Neto (UNIÃO) has a candidacy independent of supports.)	8%	5%
Real Time Big Data	6–7 Jul 2022	1,500	56%	18%	10%	1%	–	(Note: Giovani Damico (PCB) didn't score in this opinion poll.)	15%	38%
EXAME/IDEIA	1–6 Jul 2022	1,000	51%	18%	13%	2%	–	–	16%	33%
Paraná Pesquisas	30 Jun–4 Jul 2022	1,640	58%	15.8%	9.1%	0.4%	0.1%	–	16.7%	42.2%
Séculus	6–9 Jun 2022	1,526	60.55%	12.19%	7.14%	–	–	–	20.12%	48.36%
Séculus	6–9 Jun 2022	1,526	56.42%	19.92%	8.52%	–	–	(Note: Possible electoral scenario in which the presidential candidate Lula (PT) supports Jerônimo (PT) for the government of Bahia and Jair Bolsonaro (PL) supports João Roma (PL) candidacy. In this scenario, ACM Neto (UNIÃO) has a candidacy independent of supports.)	15.14%	36.5%
Real Time Big Data	7–8 Jun 2022	1,500	56%	18%	10%	1%	–	–	15%	38%
Real Time Big Data	14–16 May 2022	1,500	55%	18%	10%	1%	–	–	16%	37%
Quaest/Genial	13–16 May 2022	1,140	67%	6%	5%	1%	–	–	20%	61%
Quaest/Genial	13–16 May 2022	1,140	70%	8%	–	2%	–	–	19%	62%
Quaest/Genial	13–16 May 2022	1,140	47%	34%	10%	–	–	(Note: Possible electoral scenario in which the presidential candidate Lula (PT) supports Jerônimo (PT) for the government of Bahia and Jair Bolsonaro (PL) supports João Roma (PL) candidacy. In this scenario, ACM Neto (UNIÃO) has a candidacy independent of supports.)	10%	13%
Opnus	28 Apr–2 May 2022	1,500	44%	32%	12%	1%	–	(Note: Possible electoral scenario in which the presidential candidate Lula (PT) supports Jerônimo (PT) for the government of Bahia and Jair Bolsonaro (PL) supports João Roma (PL) candidacy.)	11%	12%
Paraná Pesquisas	19–24 Apr 2022	1,820	55.4%	16.1%	10.1%	1%	0.5%	–	16.7%	39.3%
Séculus	20–22 Apr 2022	1,526	61.54%	11.26%	5.47%	0.77%	0.45%	–	8.3%	50.28%
Séculus	24–26 Mar 2022	1,526	63.48%	6.54%	5.69%	1.83%	–	–	22.45%	56.94%
Séculus	24–26 Mar 2022	1,526	55.63%	20.29%	6.54%	–	–	(Note: Possible electoral scenario in which the presidential candidate Lula (PT) supports Jerônimo (PT) for the government of Bahia and Jair Bolsonaro (PL) supports João Roma (PL) candidacy.)	17.54%	35.34%
Quaest/Genial	16–19 Mar 2022	1,140	66%	4%	5%	2%	–	–	23%	62%
Quaest/Genial	16–19 Mar 2022	1,140	69%	6%	–	3%	–	–	22%	63%
Quaest/Genial	16–19 Mar 2022	1,140	43%	37%	9%	–	–	(Note: Possible electoral scenario in which the presidential candidate Lula (PT) supports Jerônimo (PT) for the government of Bahia and Jair Bolsonaro (PL) supports João Roma (PL) candidacy. In this scenario, ACM Neto (UNIÃO) has a candidacy independent of supports.)	11%	6%
Opnus	16–18 Mar 2022	1,500	65%	6%	8%	1%	–	–	20%	57%
11–25 March 2022		Jerônimo Rodrigues is announced as the official candidate for the government by the Workers' Party (PT), along with other official candidates. João Roma leaves Republicanos and decides to join the Liberal Party (PL).								
Pollster/client(s)	Date(s) conducted	Sample size	Neto UNIÃO	Jaques PT	Roma Republicanos	Bernadete PSOL	Otto PSD	Others	Abst. Undec	Lead
Real Time Big Data	21–22 Feb 2022	1,200	45%	30%	9%	5%	–	–	11%	15%
Real Time Big Data	21–22 Feb 2022	1,200	48%	–	10%	7%	17%	–	18%	31%
8 Feb 2022		Democrats (DEM) and the Social Liberal Party (PSL)'s merger, Brazil Union (UNIÃO), is approved by the Superior Electoral Court (TSE).								
Pollster/client(s)	Date(s) conducted	Sample size	Neto DEM	Jaques PT	Roma Republicanos	Raíssa PL	Mendes PSOL	Others	Abst. Undec	Lead
BN/Séculus	24–27 Jan 2022	1,526	54.72%	24.57%	4.26%	0.59%	–	3.68% (Note: João Leão (PP) with 1.77%; Otto Alencar (PSD) with 1.25% and Bernadete Souza (PSOL) with 0,66%)	12.19%	30.15%
BN/Séculus	24–27 Jan 2022	1,526	55.7%	25.56%	5.57%	–	–	1,05% (Note: Bernadete Souza (PSOL) with 1.05%)	12.12%	30.14%
Opnus/Metrópole	19–22 Jan 2022	1,500	52%	29%	5%	–	1%	–	13%	23%
Opnus/Metrópole	19–22 Jan 2022	1,500	33%	46%	11%	–	1%	(Note: Possible electoral scenario in which the presidential candidate Lula (PT) supports Jaques Wagner (PT) for the government of Bahia; Ciro Gomes (PDT) supports ACM Neto (DEM) candidacy and Jair Bolsonaro (PL) supports João Roma (Republicans) candidacy.)	9%	13%

2021

Pollster/client(s)	Date(s) conducted	Sample size	Neto DEM	Jaques PT	Roma Republicanos	Raíssa Ind.	Mendes PSOL	Others	Abst. Undec	Lead
Paraná Pesquisas	24–28 Nov 2021	2,002	54.8%	23.1%	3.9%	2.6%	0.3%	0.9% (Note: Alexandre Aleluia (DEM) with 0.9%)	14.3%	31.7%
Paraná Pesquisas	24–28 Nov 2021	2,002	55.1%	23.3%	4%	2.7%	0.4%	–	14.4%	31.8%
Paraná Pesquisas	24–28 Nov 2021	2,002	56.2%	23.5%	5.2%	–	–	–	15.1%	32.7%
Paraná Pesquisas	24–28 Nov 2021	2,002	36.6%	36.8%	13.6%	–	–	(Note: Possible electoral scenario in which the presidential candidate Lula (PT) supports Jaques Wagner (PT) for the government of Bahia; Sergio Moro (PODE) supports ACM Neto (DEM) candidacy and Jair Bolsonaro (Ind.) supports João Roma (Republicans) candidacy.)	13%	0.2%
Real Time Big Data	24–25 Nov 2021	1,000	43%	30%	9%	–	–	3% (Note: Bernadete Souza (PSOL) with 3%)	15%	13%
Real Time Big Data	24–25 Nov 2021	1,000	45%	30%	–	–	–	–	25%	15%
Paraná Pesquisas	4–7 Aug 2021	2,008	50%	24.1%	3%	3.7%	1.3%	–	16.9%	25.9%
Paraná Pesquisas	4–7 Aug 2021	2,008	52.3%	25.4%	4.5%	–	–	–	17.8%	26.9%
Paraná Pesquisas	4–7 Aug 2021	2,008	37.9%	35%	13.7%	–	–	(Note: Possible electoral scenario in which the presidential candidate Ciro Gomes (PDT) supports ACM Neto (DEM) for the government of Bahia; Lula (PT) supports Jaques Wagner (PT) candidacy and Jair Bolsonaro (Ind.) supports João Roma (Republicans) candidacy.)	13,5%	2.9%
Real Time Big Data	13–15 Jul 2021	1,200	41%	27%	4%	–	–	2% (Note: Hilton Coelho (PSOL) with 2%)	26%	14%
Real Time Big Data	13–15 Jul 2021	1,200	35%	29%	15%	–	–	2% (Note: Possible electoral scenario in which the presidential candidate Ciro Gomes (PDT) supports ACM Neto (DEM) for the government of Bahia; Lula (PT) supports Jaques Wagner (PT) candidacy and Guilherme Boulos (PSOL) supports Hilton Coelho (PSOL) candidacy. In this scenario, Coelho has 2% of the vote.)	19%	6%
Instituto Ranking	10–14 Jul 2021	2,000	27.35%	18.15%	0.75%	1.75%	0.55%	5.45% (Note: Otto Alencar (PSD) with 2.25%; Alexandre Aleluia (DEM) with 1.3%; others (nonspecified) with 1% and João Leão (PP) with 0.9%)	46%	9.2%
Instituto Ranking	10–14 Jul 2021	2,000	42.15%	27%	1.05%	3.1%	0,85%	8.3% (Note: Otto Alencar (PSD) with 4.2%; Alexandre Aleluia (DEM) with 2.05%; João Leão (PP) with 1.5% and Angelo Coronel (PSD) with 0.55%)	17.55%	15.15%
Paraná Pesquisas	12–15 May 2021	2,002	38%	33.6%	15.2%	–	–	–	13.2%	4.4%

=== Second round ===
The second round (if necessary) is scheduled to take place on 30 October 2022.

ACM Neto vs. Jerônimo

Pollster/client(s)	Date(s) conducted	Sample size	Neto UNIÃO	Jerônimo PT	Abst. Undec	Lead
DataFolha/Metrópole	12–14 Sep 2022	1,212	60%	33%	7%	27%
DataFolha/Metrópole	22–24 Aug 2022	1,008	68%	23%	10	45%
AtlasIntel/A Tarde	30 Jul–8 Aug 2022	1,600	42.7%	39.9%	–	2.8%
Quaest/Genial	9–12 Jul 2022	1,140	66%	17%	17%	49%
EXAME/IDEIA	1–6 Jul 2022	1,000	58%	19%	23%	39%
Quaest/Genial	13–16 May 2022	1,140	73%	11%	16%	62%

ACM Neto vs. João Roma

Pollster/client(s)	Date(s) conducted	Sample size	Neto UNIÃO	Roma PL	Abst. Undec	Lead
AtlasIntel/A Tarde	30 Jul–8 Aug 2022	1,600	49.7%	25.3%	–	24.4%
Quaest/Genial	9–12 Jul 2022	1,140	68%	13%	18%	55%
EXAME/IDEIA	1–6 Jul 2022	1,000	61%	14%	25%	47%
Quaest/Genial	13–16 May 2022	1,140	73%	10%	20%	63%

João Roma vs. Jerônimo

Pollster/client(s)	Date(s) conducted	Sample size	Roma PL	Jerônimo PT	Abst. Undec	Lead
AtlasIntel/A Tarde	30 Jul–8 Aug 2022	1,600	23.8%	48.2%	–	24.4%
Quaest/Genial	9–12 Jul 2022	1,140	23%	26%	52%	3%
EXAME/IDEIA	1–6 Jul 2022	1,000	30%	46%	24%	16%
Quaest/Genial	13–16 May 2022	1,140	24%	22%	55%	2%

=== Senator ===
2022

Pollster/client(s)	Date(s) conducted	Sample size	Otto PSD	Leão PP	Raíssa PL	Barreto PMN	Tâmara PSOL	Cícero PCO	Abst. Undec.	Lead
Paraná Pesquisas	14-18 Sep 2022	1,540	33.9%	19.2%	14%	2.1%	2.7%	1.5%	26.7%	14.7%
DataFolha/Metrópole	12-14 Sep 2022	1,212	39%	16%	8%	3%	4%	6%	28%	22%
Paraná Pesquisas	1-5 Sep 2022	1,540	31.8%	17.1%	14.7%	1.7%	3.4%	1.7%	29.6%	14.7%
Real Big Time Data	2-3 Sep 2022	1,200	25%	17%	12%	–	4%	–	42%	8%
IPEC/TV Bahia	23-25 Aug 2022	1,008	30%	11%	7%	5%	5%	4%	37%	19%
DataFolha/Metrópole	22-24 Aug 2022	1,008	32%	10%	7%	4%	4%	6%	37%	22%
Paraná Pesquisas	11-15 Aug 2022	1,640	32.2%	13.7%	13.5%	0.9%	2.7%	0.5%	36.5%	18.5%
1-9 August 2022		Marcelo Barreto launches candidacy for Federal Senate by the Party of National Mobilization. Marcelo Nilo confirms pre-candidacy for re-election to the Chamber of Deputies. Workers' Cause Party launches Cícero Araújo as candidate for the Senate.								
Pollster/client(s)	Date(s) conducted	Sample size	Otto PSD	Leão PP	Raíssa PL	Marcelo Republicanos	Tâmara PSOL	Others	Abst. Undec.	Lead
AtlasIntel/A Tarde	30 Jul–4 Aug 2022	1,600	39.2%	12.9%	16.2%	–	5%	–	23%	26.7%
Séculus	23–26 Jul 2022	1,526	28.8%	12.9%	9.5%	–	2.8%	–	45.8%	15.9%
Quaest/Genial	9–12 Jul 2022	1,140	32%	10%	6%	6%	4%	–	42%	22%
Quaest/Genial	9–12 Jul 2022	1,140	34%	12%	8%	–	5%	–	41%	22%
Quaest/Genial	9–12 Jul 2022	1,140	36%	14%	–	–	8%	–	41%	22%
Real Time Big Data	6–7 Jul 2022	1,500	29%	8%	10%	–	6%	–	47%	19%
EXAME/IDEIA	1–6 Jul 2022	1,000	22%	13%	11%	6%	5%	–	43%	9%
Paraná Pesquisas	30 Jun–4 Jul 2022	1,640	33.9%	12.8%	7.4%	–	4.2%	–	41.7%	21.1%
Séculus	6–9 Jun 2022	1,526	26.21%	9.5%	8.19%	–	2.03%	–	54.06%	16.71%
Real Time Big Data	7–8 Jun 2022	1,500	29%	6%	11%	–	5%	–	49%	18%
Real Time Big Data	14–16 May 2022	1,500	30%	6%	10%	–	4%	–	50%	20%
Quaest/Genial	13–16 May 2022	1,140	34%	8%	6%	9%	3%	–	39%	25%
Quaest/Genial	13–16 May 2022	1,140	38%	10%	7%	–	5%	–	39%	28%
Quaest/Genial	13–16 May 2022	1,140	41%	10%	–	–	9%	–	40%	31%
Opnus	28 Apr–2 May 2022	1,500	29%	12%	10%	–	3%	–	46%	17%
Opnus	28 Apr–2 May 2022	1,500	46%	17%	–	–	–		37%	29%
João Leão gives up on his candidacy to the Federal Senate in favor of his son Cacá Leão.
Pollster/client(s)	Date(s) conducted	Sample size	Otto PSD	Leão PP	Raíssa PL	Marcelo PSB	Tâmara PSOL	Others	Abst. Undec.	Lead
Paraná Pesquisas	19–24 Apr 2022	1,820	32.7%	15.4%	7%	–	5.6%	–	39.2%	17.3%
Séculus	20–22 Apr 2022	1,526	28.44%	16.09%	8,49%	–	1.61%	–	45.37%	12.35%
Séculus	24–26 Mar 2022	1,526	26.17%	16.36%	9.10%	–	3.01%	–	45.35%	9.81%
Quaest/Genial	16–19 Mar 2022	1,140	21%	12%	6%	4%	3%	20% (Note: José Ronaldo (UNIÃO) with 13% and Márcio Marinho (Republicanos) with 7%)	35%	1%
Quaest/Genial	16–19 Mar 2022	1,140	24%	13%	7%	–	4%	16% (Note: José Ronaldo (UNIÃO) with 16%)	36%	8%
Quaest/Genial	16–19 Mar 2022	1,140	26%	16%	–	–	–	20% (Note: José Ronaldo (UNIÃO) with 20%)	38%	6%
Opnus	16–18 Mar 2022	1,500	27%	11%	–	–	–	11% (Note: Márcio Marinho (Republicanos) with 6%, Félix Mendonça Júnior (PDT) with 3% and João Gualberto (PSDB) with 2%)	50%	16%

== Results ==
=== Governor ===
Candidate	Running mate	Party	First round		Second round	
Candidate	Running mate	Party	Votes	%	Votes	%
Jerônimo Rodrigues	Geraldo Júnior (MDB)	PT	4,019,830	49.45	4,480,464	52.79
ACM Neto	Ana Coelho (Republicanos)	UNIÃO	3,316,711	40.80	4,007,023	47.21
João Roma	Leonídia Umbelina (PMB)	PL	738,311	9.08		
Kleber Rosa	Ronaldo Mansur	PSOL	48,239	0.59		
Giovani Damico	João Coimbra	PCB	5,951	0.07		
Marcelo Millet	Roque Vieira Jr.	PCO	826			
Total			8,129,042	100.00	8,487,487	100.00
Valid votes			8,129,042	91.68	8,487,487	94.68
Invalid votes			500,667	5.65	363,656	4.06
Blank votes			236,750	2.67	113,101	1.26
Total votes			8,866,459	100.00	8,964,244	100.00
Registered voters/turnout			11,291,528	78.52	11,291,528	79.39
PT hold						
Source: TSE

Popular vote (first round)
Jerônimo	49.45%
ACM Neto	40.80%
Others	9.75%

Popular vote (second round)
Jerônimo	52.79%
ACM Neto	47.21%

=== Senator ===
Candidate	Party	Votes	%
Otto Alencar (incumbent)	PSD	4,218,333	58.32
Cacá Leão	PP	1,826,218	25.25
Raissa Soares	PL	1,057,085	14.61
Tâmara Azevedo	PSOL	119,307	1.65
Marcelo Barreto	PMN	12,318	0.17
Total		7,233,261	100.00
Valid votes		7,233,261	81.58
Invalid votes		1,100,042	12.41
Blank votes		533,156	6.01
Total votes		8,866,459	100.00
Registered voters/turnout		11,291,528	78.52
PSD hold			

Popular vote
Alencar	58.32%
Leão	25.25%
Soares	14.61%
Others	1.82%

=== Chamber of Deputies ===
Party or alliance		Votes	%	Seats	+/–
Brazil of Hope	Workers' Party	1,369,997	17.22	7	▼1
Brazil of Hope	Communist Party of Brazil	265,901	3.34	2	Steady
Brazil of Hope	Green Party	124,105	1.56	1	▲1
Social Democratic Party		1,141,474	14.34	6	▲2
Brazil Union		1,075,013	13.51	6	New
Progressistas		776,833	9.76	4	▲1
Liberal Party		620,140	7.79	3	▲1
Republicanos		533,293	6.70	3	▲1
Democratic Labour Party		396,887	4.99	2	Steady
Brazilian Democratic Movement		289,982	3.64	1	▲1
Avante		276,488	3.47	1	▼1
Always Forward	Brazilian Social Democracy Party	215,880	2.71	1	Steady
Always Forward	Cidadania	58,179	0.73	0	Steady
Brazilian Socialist Party		194,702	2.45	1	▼1
Podemos		176,466	2.22	1	Steady
Social Christian Party		151,321	1.90	0	Steady
Solidariedade		108,138	1.36	0	Steady
Brazilian Labour Party		52,136	0.66	0	Steady
PSOL REDE	Socialism and Liberty Party	46,756	0.59	0	Steady
PSOL REDE	Sustainability Network	10,904	0.14	0	Steady
Patriota		14,405	0.18	0	Steady
New Party		12,426	0.16	0	Steady
Brazilian Woman's Party		11,944	0.15	0	Steady
Republican Party of the Social Order		9,577	0.12	0	Steady
Brazilian Communist Party		6,017	0.08	0	Steady
Christian Democracy		5,953	0.07	0	Steady
Agir		4,495	0.06	0	Steady
Popular Unity		4,043	0.05	0	Steady
Brazilian Labour Renewal Party		3,701	0.05	0	Steady
Workers' Cause Party		375	0.00	0	Steady
Total		7,957,531	100.00	39	–
Valid votes		7,957,531	89.76		
Invalid votes		447,580	5.05		
Blank votes		460,447	5.19		
Total votes		8,865,558	100.00		
Registered voters/turnout		11,291,528	78.52		

=== Legislative Assembly ===
Party or alliance		Votes	%	Seats	+/–
Brazil of Hope	Workers' Party	1,219,500	15.36	9	▼1
Brazil of Hope	Communist Party of Brazil	372,907	4.70	4	▼1
Brazil of Hope	Green Party	335,364	4.22	4	▲4
Brazil Union		1,151,774	14.51	10	New
Social Democratic Party		1,109,991	13.98	9	Steady
Progressistas		718,906	9.06	6	▼1
Liberal Party		469,296	5.91	4	▲3
Republicanos		401,163	5.05	3	▲1
Always Forward	Brazilian Social Democracy Party	373,344	4.70	3	Steady
Always Forward	Cidadania	35,956	0.45	0	Steady
Brazilian Socialist Party		311,346	3.92	2	▼2
Solidariedade		274,173	3.45	2	▲2
Brazilian Democratic Movement		246,881	3.11	2	▲1
Democratic Labour Party		222,709	2.81	1	▼2
Social Christian Party		195,628	2.46	1	▼2
PSOL REDE	Socialism and Liberty Party	148,051	1.87	1	Steady
PSOL REDE	Sustainability Network	6,370	0.08	0	Steady
Avante		121,860	1.54	1	Steady
Patriota		112,674	1.42	1	Steady
Brazilian Labour Party		52,108	0.66	0	Steady
Party of National Mobilization		12,714	0.16	0	Steady
New Party		9,783	0.12	0	Steady
Brazilian Labour Renewal Party		7,264	0.09	0	Steady
Brazilian Woman's Party		7,056	0.09	0	Steady
Republican Party of the Social Order		6,634	0.08	0	Steady
Agir		6,528	0.08	0	Steady
Christian Democracy		4,892	0.06	0	Steady
Popular Unity		2,844	0.04	0	New
Total		7,937,716	100.00	63	–
Valid votes		7,937,716	89.53		
Invalid votes		448,169	5.05		
Blank votes		480,573	5.42		
Total votes		8,866,458	100.00		
Registered voters/turnout		11,291,528	78.52		
