= Cacá Leão =

Brazilian politician (born 1979)

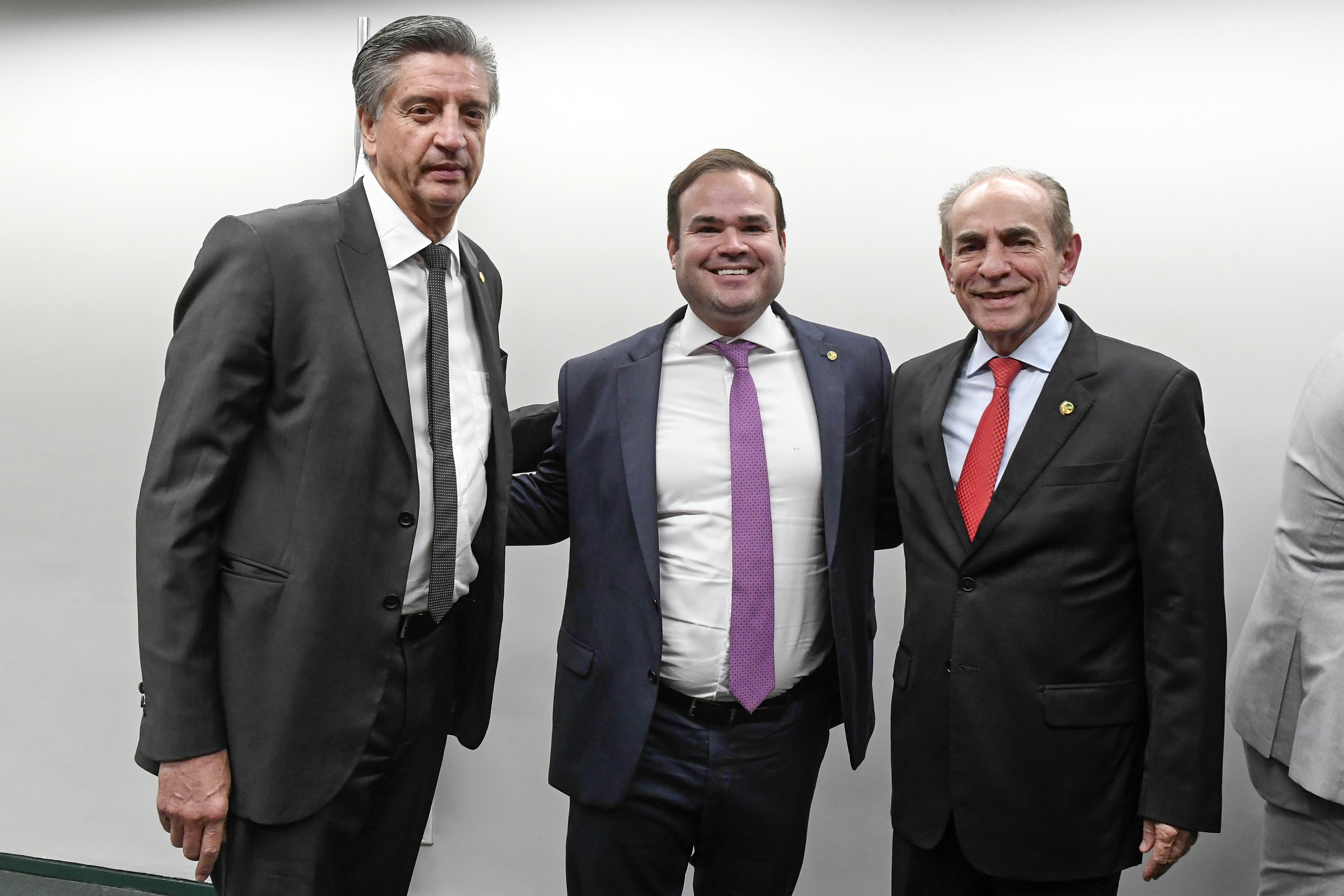
- Leão in 2019

Member of the Chamber of Deputies
- In office 1 February 2015 – 31 January 2023
- Constituency: Bahia

Personal details
- Born: 3 November 1979 (age 46)
- Party: Progressistas (since 2005)
- Parent: João Leão (father)

Carlos Felipe Vazquez de Souza Leão (born 3 November 1979), better known as Cacá Leão, is a Brazilian politician. From 2015 to 2023, he was a member of the Chamber of Deputies. From 2011 to 2015, he was a member of the Legislative Assembly of Bahia. He is the son of João Leão.

== Career ==
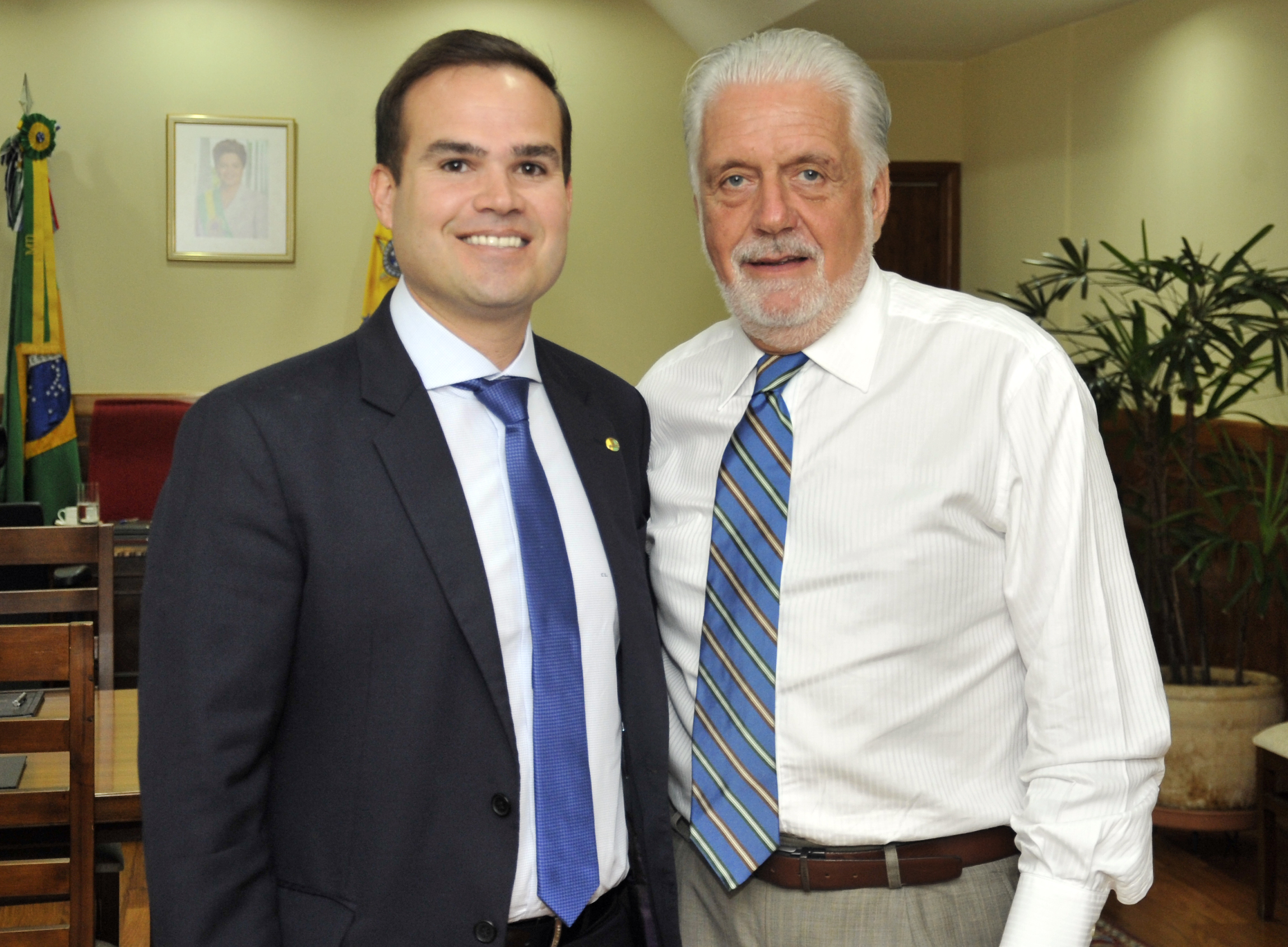
Cacá Leão in a meeting with then-Defense Minister Jaques Wagner, in 2015.

He graduated in Municipal Administration and Planning from Faculdade Metropolitana Polifucs, in Lauro de Freitas, in 2002, with a postgraduate degree in Public Management, completed in 2004. Between 2001 and 2003 he worked as a special advisor to the mayor of Lauro de Freitas, the city that is the main electoral stronghold of his father, who was mayor between the late 1980s and early 1990s. He ran for mayor of Lauro de Freitas in 2004, having been defeated by the Workers' Party candidate Moema Gramacho. From 2009 to 2010 he was Director of Housing for the city of Salvador, during the administration of the PMDB member João Henrique Blasi. His first elected office came in 2010, when he became a State Deputy. In 2014 he was elected federal deputy, obtaining 125,605 votes. He was re-elected again in 2018 with 106,502 votes. In 2022 he tried to be elected senator of the republic, but was defeated by Otto Alencar, finishing second with only 25.26% of the valid votes.
