= Diego Coronel =

Brazilian politician (born 1983)

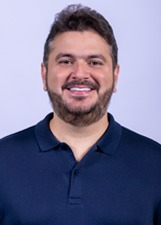
- Coronel in 2022

Member of the Chamber of Deputies
- Incumbent
- Assumed office 1 February 2023
- Constituency: Bahia

Member of the Legislative Assembly of Bahia
- In office 1 February 2019 – 1 February 2023
- Constituency: At-large

Personal details
- Born: Diego Henrique Silva Cerqueira Martins; 22 January 1983 (age 43) Coração de Maria, Bahia, Brazil
- Party: Republicanos (2026–present)
- Other political affiliations: PL (2003–2006); PR (2006–2011); PSD (2011–2026)
- Parent: Angelo Coronel (father)

Diego Henrique Silva Cerqueira Martins (born 22 January 1983), better known as Diego Coronel, is a Brazilian politician serving as a member of the Chamber of Deputies since 2023. From 2019 to 2023, he was a member of the Legislative Assembly of Bahia. From 2009 to 2012, he served as mayor of Coração de Maria. He is the son of Angelo Coronel and Eleusa Coronel.
