= Hassan de Zé Cocá =

Brazilian businessman and politician

Hassan Andrade Iosseff
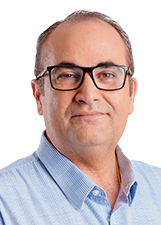
- Hassan in 2024

State deputy of Bahia
- Incumbent
- Assumed office February 1, 2023

Deputy Mayor of Jequié
- In office February 1, 2016 – December 31, 2020

Personal details
- Born: May 25, 1969 (age 57) Jequié, Bahia, Brazil
- Party: Progressistas
- Other political affiliations: Brazilian Labour Party (2016–2017); Social Democratic Party (2017–2021); Podemos (2021–2022)
- Occupation: businessman politician
- Nickname: Hassan de Zé Cocá

Hassan Andrade Iosseff, popularly known as Hassan de Zé Cocá, (May 25, 1969) is a Brazilian businessman and politician affiliated with the Progressistas (PP). Since 2023, he has served as a state deputy for Bahia.

== Biography ==
Hassan was born in Jequié, a city in the interior of Bahia, in 1969. He finished high school and started working, eventually becoming a partner in a clothing store.

=== Politics ===
Affiliated with the Brazilian Labour Party (PTB), he was a candidate for deputy mayor of Jequié in the 2016 Jequié municipal election, on a ticket headed by Sérgio da Gameleira, affiliated with the Brazilian Socialist Party (PSB). The political alliance formed by Hassan and Sérgio was elected with 44% of the votes in the first round, beating Fernando Vieira, a doctor affiliated with the Green Party (PV).

The following year, Hassan left the PTB and joined the Social Democratic Party (PSD). Sérgio was suspended from his position pending investigation for administrative impropriety, leaving the position vacant for ninety days, allowing Hassan to take over on an interim basis. Despite having assumed the position of mayor, he chose not to run for mayor in the 2020 election, which was won by Zé Cocá.

Hassan approached Cocá's administration and served during his term as Municipal Secretary between 2020 and 2021. Between 2021 and 2022, he was member of Podemos (PODE).

In 2022, he joined the Progressistas (PP) party in a ceremony attended by important figures from the party in the state, including Zé Cocá, Mário Negromonte Jr., João Leão, Nelson Leal, Niltinho, and Eduardo Salles. In the same year, he ran for state deputy of Bahia in the 2024 election. He was elected to office after receiving more than 60,000 votes. He supported ACM Neto's candidacy for governor of Bahia during the election, but the candidate was defeated by Jerônimo Rodrigues, affiliated with the Workers' Party (PT), who won 52% of the votes. The following year, his party, the PP, became part of Jerônimo Rodrigues' government, bringing Hassan closer to the governor's political group.

=== Electoral performance ===
Year	Position	Party	Votes	Result	Ref.
2016	Deputy Mayor of Jequié	PTB	33.594	Elected	
2024	State deputy of Bahia	PP	60.718	Elected	
