= Angelo Coronel =

Brazilian politician (born 1958)

- Official portrait

Member of the Federal Senate
- Incumbent
- Assumed office 1 February 2019
- Constituency: Bahia

Personal details
- Born: 3 May 1958 (age 68)
- Party: Republicans (since 2026)
- Other political affiliations: Social Democratic Party (since 2011)
- Children: Diego Coronel, Angelo Coronel Filho
- Awards: Medalha do Pacificador (Brazil)

Angelo Mário Coronel de Azevedo Martins (born 3 May 1958) is a Brazilian politician serving as a member of the Federal Senate since 2019. He was a member of the Legislative Assembly of Bahia from 1995 to 1999, from 2001 to 2002, and from 2003 to 2019, and served as president of the assembly from 2017 to 2019. From 1989 to 1992, he served as mayor of Coração de Maria.
