= Jerônimo Rodrigues =

Brazilian indigenous politician (born 1965)

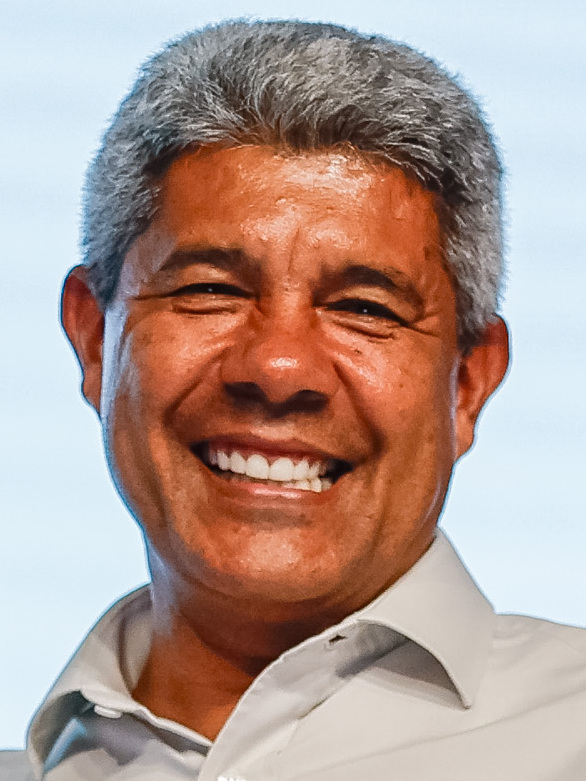
- Jerônimo in 2024

Governor of Bahia
- Incumbent
- Assumed office 1 January 2023
- Vice Governor: Geraldo Júnior
- Preceded by: Rui Costa

State Secretary of Education of Bahia
- In office 1 February 2019 – 31 March 2022
- Governor: Rui Costa
- Preceded by: Walter Pinheiro
- Succeeded by: Danilo de Melo Souza

State Secretary of Rural Development of Bahia
- In office 1 January 2015 – 1 February 2019
- Governor: Rui Costa
- Preceded by: Rui Costa
- Succeeded by: Josias Gomes

Personal details
- Born: Jerônimo Rodrigues Souza; 3 April 1965 (age 61) Aiquara, Bahia, Brazil
- Party: PT (since 1990)
- Education: Federal University of Bahia
- Profession: Professor and agricultural engineer

Jerônimo Rodrigues Souza (born 3 April 1965) is a Brazilian indigenous politician, agricultural professor, and bureaucrat who was elected Governor of Bahia in 2022 election. Winning against ACM Neto in an upset, Jerônimo, a professor at State University of Feira de Santana, became the first self declared indigenous governor in Brazilian history. He previously served as an advisor in technology to Governor Jaques Wagner, as an advisor to the Rousseff government, and as head of multiple ministries in the government of Rui Costa, rising through the ranks of governmental management. He is a member of the Workers' Party.

== Early life ==
Born in Palmeirinha, a village in the municipality of Aiquara, to Zeferino Rodrigues, a farmer, and Maria Cerqueira, a seamstress, Jerônimo attended public school in Jequié and received a master's degree in rural development from the Federal University of Bahia in 1991.

== Bureaucratic career ==
=== Academic career ===
Jerônimo was accepted to a graduate program at the State University of Feira de Santana. He taught several subjects to undergraduates including Economic Sciences, Accounting Sciences, Law, Administration and Geography. After finishing graduate school, he returned to Aiquara where he was professor at the Colégio Municipal Américo Souto and an advisor to the mayor in agricultural planning. During this period, through student movements, he began to be affiliated with the Workers' Party largely in opposition to the 'Carlism' of Antônio Carlos Magalhães.

Jerônimo, after participating in his campaign for governor, was appointed by Jaques Wagner an advisor to the Secretariat of Science, Technology and Innovation of Bahia in 2007, before becoming a member of the strategic division of the Secretariat of Planning.

=== National career ===
After the success of his work and his experience in agricultural economics, he was recommended by Wagner to Dilma Rousseff who appointed him to various agricultural and planning positions, serving as National Secretary for Territorial Development, special advisor to the Ministry of Agrarian Development, executive secretary of the Pro Territories/Cumbre Ibero-American Program and executive secretary of the National Council for Sustainable Rural Development.

=== State secretariats ===
After coordinating Rui Costa's campaign for governor, Jerônimo helped create the Secretariat of Rural Development, which he headed from 2015-2018. After coordinating Costa's landslide reelection, he was appointed Secretary of Education.

==== Secretary of Education ====
As one of the main state secretaries of the new PT administration, Jerônimo had carte blanche to carry out an investment of R$3.5 billion in public schools. His management focused on offering thousands of vacancies in vocational courses through the Educar para Trabalho program.

During the Covid-19 pandemic, amidst the children's learning difficulties, the secretary created two programs to combat school dropout: the Bolsa-Presença, which offered monthly aid of 150 reals to families of students from the state education network, and Mais Futuro, whose objective was to keep young people in the university with financial support. It also implemented the Student Food Voucher and Mais Estudos.

== Governor of Bahia ==
=== 2022 election ===
Map of the gubernatorial election, Rodrigues in red, Neto in blue

Jerônimo had the problem of introducing himself to Bahia, as he had largely been a hiden political actor. Slowly gaining in the polls against the former mayor of Salvador ACM Neto, Jerônimo combined support for Luiz Inácio Lula da Silva in the 2022 Brazilian presidential election with generally rural Catholic support for the PT. Some pointed to a two rallies with Lula as a tipping point in public support after Neto's race scandals.

Winning close to 50% in the first round, Jerônimo's victory was considered an upset. He beat Neto in the second round.

== Personal life ==
Jerônimo is married to Tatiana Velloso, a professor at Federal University of Recôncavo Baiano, and has one son.

Jerônimo is self declared indigenous and Catholic.

Political offices
Preceded by Rui Costa	State Secretary of Rural Development of Bahia; 2015–2019	Succeeded by Josias Gomes
Preceded by Walter Pinheiro	State Secretary of Education of Bahia; 2019–2022	Succeeded by Danilo de Melo Souza
Preceded by Rui Costa	Governor of Bahia; 2023–present	Incumbent
