= Otto Alencar Filho =

Brazilian politician (born 1977)

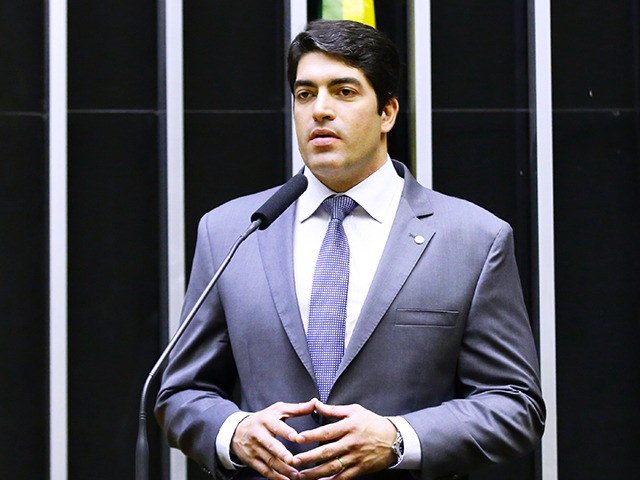

Member of the Chamber of Deputies
- Incumbent
- Assumed office 1 February 2019
- Constituency: Bahia

Personal details
- Born: 7 July 1977 (age 49)
- Party: Social Democratic Party (since 2011)
- Parent: Otto Alencar (father)
- Relatives: Daniel Alencar (brother)

Otto Roberto Mendonça de Alencar Filho (born 7 July 1977) is a Brazilian politician serving as a member of the Chamber of Deputies since 2019. He is the son of Otto Alencar.
