= Daniel Alencar =

Brazilian politician (born 1980)

Member-elect of the Chamber of Deputies
- Assuming office 1 February 2027
- Constituency: Bahia

Personal details
- Born: Daniel Figueiredo de Alencar; 25 June 1980 (age 46) Salvador, Bahia, Brazil
- Party: PSD
- Parent: Otto Alencar (father)
- Relatives: Otto Alencar Filho (brother)
- Profession: Physician

Daniel Figueiredo de Alencar (born 25 June 1980) is a Brazilian politician who was elected member of the Chamber of Deputies in 2026. He is the son of Otto Alencar and the brother of Otto Alencar Filho.
