= Antonio Henrique Júnior =

Brazilian politician (born 1970)

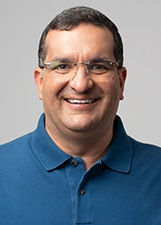
- Antonio Henrique Júnior

Member of the Legislative Assembly of Bahia
- Incumbent
- Assumed office 2015

Personal details
- Born: 30 August 1970 (age 55) Itabuna
- Party: Progressistas

Antonio Henrique Júnior (born 30 August 1970 in Itabuna) is a Brazilian politician serving as a member of the Legislative Assembly of Bahia since 2015.

He was reelected in 2018 and 2022.
