= Vitor Azevedo =

Brazilian politician (born 1979)

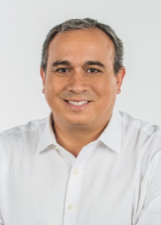
- Vitor Azevedo

Member of the Legislative Assembly of Bahia
- Incumbent
- Assumed office 01 February 2023

Personal details
- Born: 5 May 1979 (age 47) Salvador, Bahia
- Party: Avante (since 2026)
- Other political affiliations: REP (2019–2021); PL (2022–2026)

Vitor Viana Paranhos de Azevedo (born 5 May 1979 in Salvador, Bahia) is a Brazilian politician serving as a member of the Legislative Assembly of Bahia since 2023.

He was elected by the Liberal Party but changed in early 2026 to Avante.
