= Félix de Almeida Mendonça =

Brazilian politician (1928–2020)

Félix Mendonça
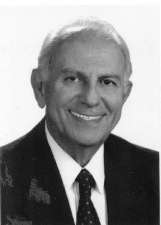

Member of the Chamber of Deputies from Bahia
- In office 1983–2011

Member of the Legislative Assembly of Bahia
- In office 1967–1971

Mayor of Itabuna
- In office 1963–1966
- Preceded by: José Almeida Alcântara
- Succeeded by: José Almeida Alcântara

Personal details
- Born: March 23, 1928 Conceição do Almeida, Bahia, Brazil
- Died: June 26, 2020 (aged 92) Salvador, Bahia, Brazil
- Party: Democratic Labour Party (Brazil) (PDT)
- Other political affiliations: PTN (1950–1955); UDN (1955–1965); ARENA (1965–1980); PDS (1980–1982); PTB (1982–2003); DEM (2003–2008)
- Spouse: Maria Helena Mendonça
- Children: 3, including Félix Mendonça Júnior
- Education: Federal University of Bahia
- Profession: Politician and engineer

Félix de Almeida Mendonça (23 March 1928 – 26 June 2020), better known simply as Félix Mendonça, was a Brazilian politician and engineer from the state of Bahia.

== Career ==
Before pursuing a career in politics, Mendonça studied Civil engineering at the Federal University of Bahia between 1951 and 1955.

Between 1963 and 1966, Mendonça held the post of mayor of Itabuna.

In 1966, he was elected member of the Legislative Assembly of Bahia. His tenure lasted from 1967 to 1971.

In 1982, he was elected member of the Chamber of Deputies from Bahia. His first term went from 1983 to 1987.

In 1986, he decided to run for a spot at the Brazilian Senate, but failed to secure enough votes to be elected.

In 1990, he was again elected Federal Deputy from Bahia. His second term went from 1991 to 1995.

In 1994, 1998, 2002 and 2006, he went on a four consecutive reelection streak.

In 2010, after six terms and almost twenty five years as a Federal Deputy, Mendonça decided to not run for reelection, effectively retiring from politics the following year after the end on his last term.

== Personal life and death ==
Mendonça was married to Maria Helena Mendonça and had two daughters and one son.

His son, Félix Mendonça Júnior is also a politician and has served as a member of the Federal Deputy from Bahia.

On 26 June 2020, Mendonça died in Salvador at the age of 92 due to complications brought on by COVID-19 during the COVID-19 pandemic in Brazil.
