= Centro Comunitário Cristo Libertador =

The Centro Comunitário Cristo Libertador (Community Centre of Christ the Liberator, CCCL) is a community center in Lauro de Freitas, Brazil.

== History and organization ==
The CCCL is a subordinate of the monastery Priorado São Norberto in Lauro de Freitas, which also runs the municipal church, Paróquia Nossa Senhora Aparecida e Santa Catarina de Sena. The monastery has been supported by the Austrian church for years and is run by two priests: Father Michael Schelpe (ecclesiastical name Padre Miguel) and Father Hans Ambros (Padre Milo), who come from the Austrian convent Geras. The monastery supports various charitable and important projects in the region. According to official announcements, Lauro de Freitas has grown to a size ten times higher than its initial dimension from 1980 to 2000, which underscores the need for charitable work.

== Goals ==
The CCCL aims to improve the social conditions of the inhabitants of Itinga, of whom most live in deep poverty, through direct care, food, medicine, and educational projects. The CCCL is increasingly cooperating with the Austrian Social Service, through which young Austrians can render their Civil Service.

CCCL's activities include the following:

- Supporting the creation of Supao, a soup project for slum inhabitants.
- Supporting construction projects in suburban areas.
- Constructing computer rooms and conducting computer courses.
- Transporting people by car for various purposes.
