= Moema Gramacho =

Brazilian politician, mayor of Lauro de Freitas and federal deputy for Bahia

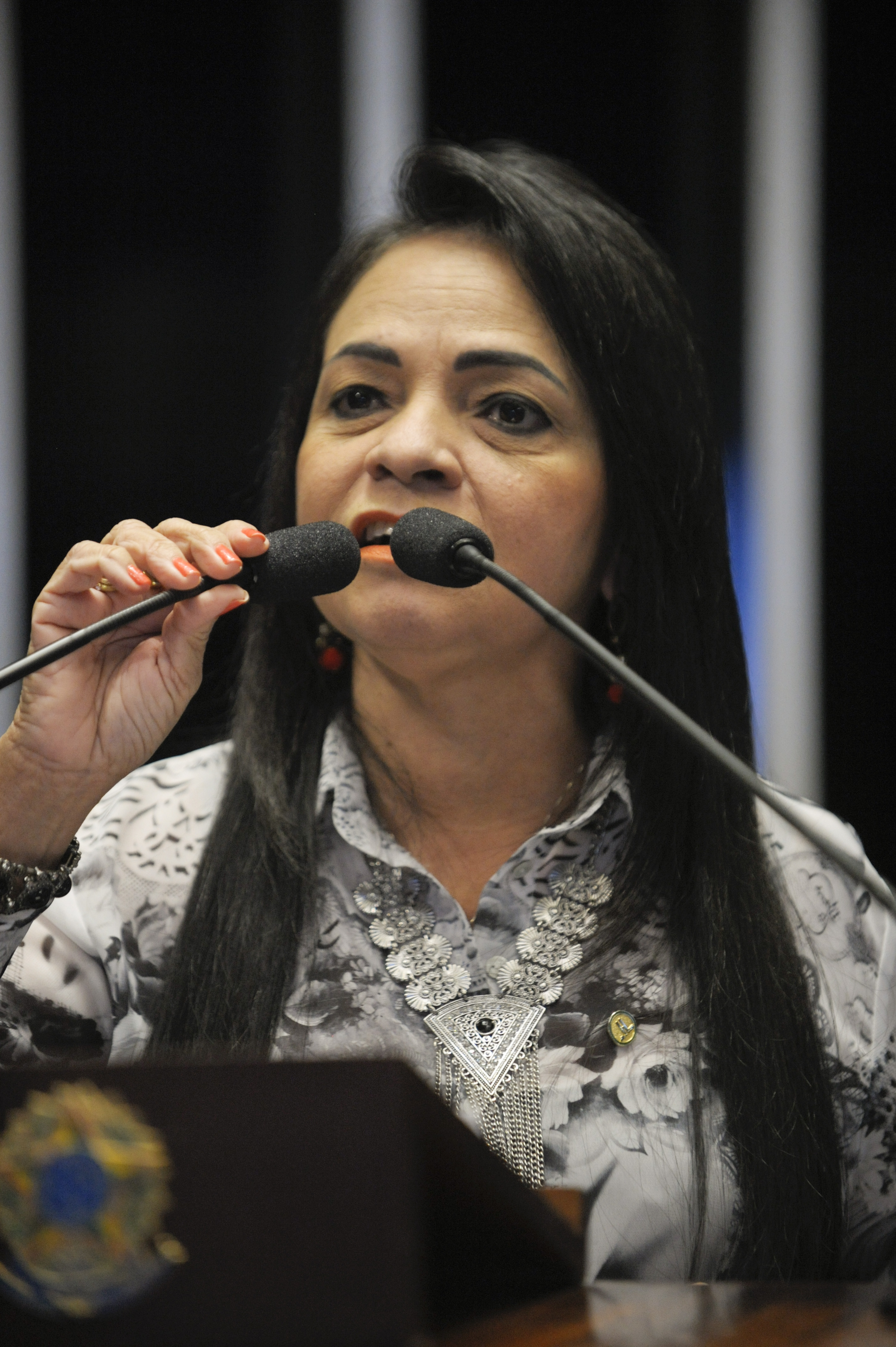
- Moema Gramacho in 2016

State Deputy of Bahia
- In office 2002–1998

Mayor of Lauro de Freitas
- In office 2005–2012

Personal details
- Born: July 4, 1958 (age 67) Salvador, Bahia, Brazil
- Party: Workers' Party

Moema Isabel Passos Gramacho (Salvador, July 4, 1958), better known as Moema Gramacho, is a Brazilian biologist, chemist, and politician. She is affiliated with the Workers' Party. She served as mayor of Lauro de Freitas for four terms and as a State and Federal Deputy for Bahia.

== Political career ==
She was a city councilor in Salvador in 1997, an alternate state deputy between 1995 and 1999 and made a full-fledged deputy in January 1997, elected state deputy in 1998, re-elected in 2002 and resigned on December 30, 2004.

She served as mayor of Lauro de Freitas from 2005 to 2012, having received several awards as an entrepreneurial mayor (for the creation of the Municipal Program for Accelerating Work, Employment and Income) and “best mayor in the Americas” by the Organização Brasil Américas. She established the first sickle cell disease reference center in Bahia and inaugurated the first public maternity hospital in Lauro de Freitas, which was closed the following year during her successor's term.

In 2013 she assumed the State Secretariat for Social Development and Poverty Alleviation. In 2014, she was elected federal deputy. In 2016 she was elected mayor of Lauro de Freitas again, with 52.34% of the valid votes. In 2020 she was elected mayor of Lauro de Freitas for the fourth time.
