= Márcio Marinho =

Brazilian politician (born 1970)

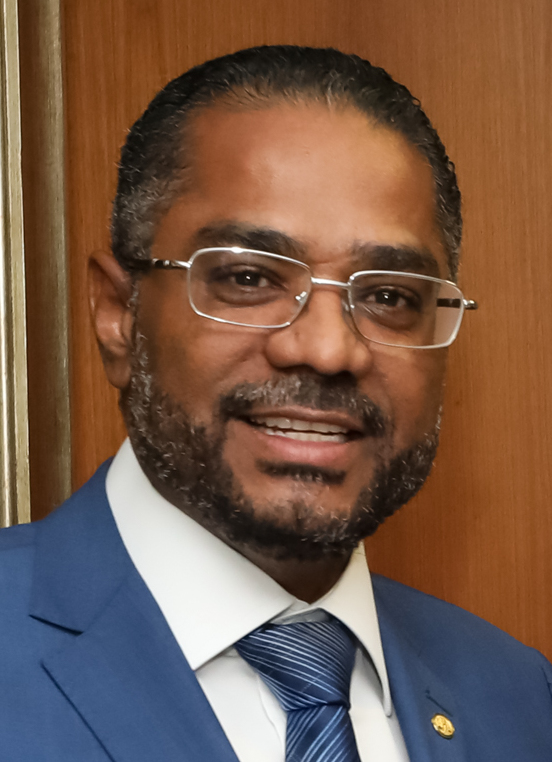

Member of the Chamber of Deputies
- Incumbent
- Assumed office 16 December 2008
- Constituency: Bahia
- In office 11 June 2008 – 10 October 2008
- Constituency: Bahia

Member of the Legislative Assembly of Bahia
- In office 1 February 2003 – 1 February 2007
- Constituency: At-large

Personal details
- Born: Márcio Carlos Marinho; 12 December 1970 (age 55) Cabo Frio, Rio de Janeiro, Brazil
- Party: Republicanos (since 2010)
- Other political affiliations: PL (2001–2006); PR (2006–2010)
- Profession: Radio host

Márcio Carlos Marinho (born 12 December 1970) is a Brazilian politician. Although born in Rio de Janeiro, he has spent his political career representing Bahia, having served as state representative since 2008.

== Personal life ==
Marinho was born to Arindo Carlos Marinho and Izabel Rodrigues Marinho. He grew up in a poor household and two of his brothers drowned when he was 14. Prior to becoming a politician Marinho worked as a communicator and public manager. Marinho identifies as an Afro-Brazilian and as an Evangelical Christian. He is an ordained bishop of the Universal Church of the Kingdom of God.

== Political career ==
Marinho voted in favor of the impeachment against then-president Dilma Rousseff and political reformation. He would later vote in against opening a corruption investigation against Rousseff's successor Michel Temer, and voted in favor of the 2017 Brazilian labor reforms.
