= 2010 Bahia general election =

Elections in Brazil

2010 Bahia gubernatorial election
- October 3, 2010
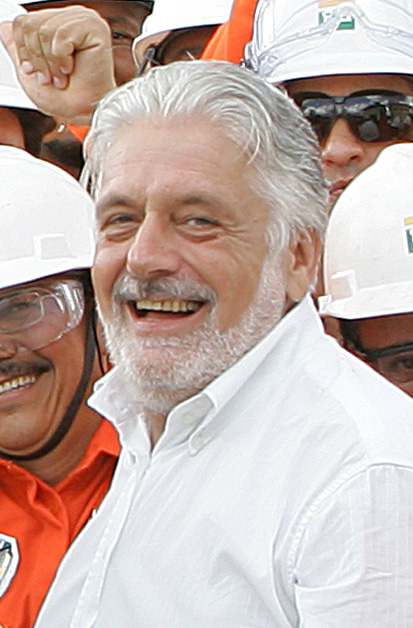

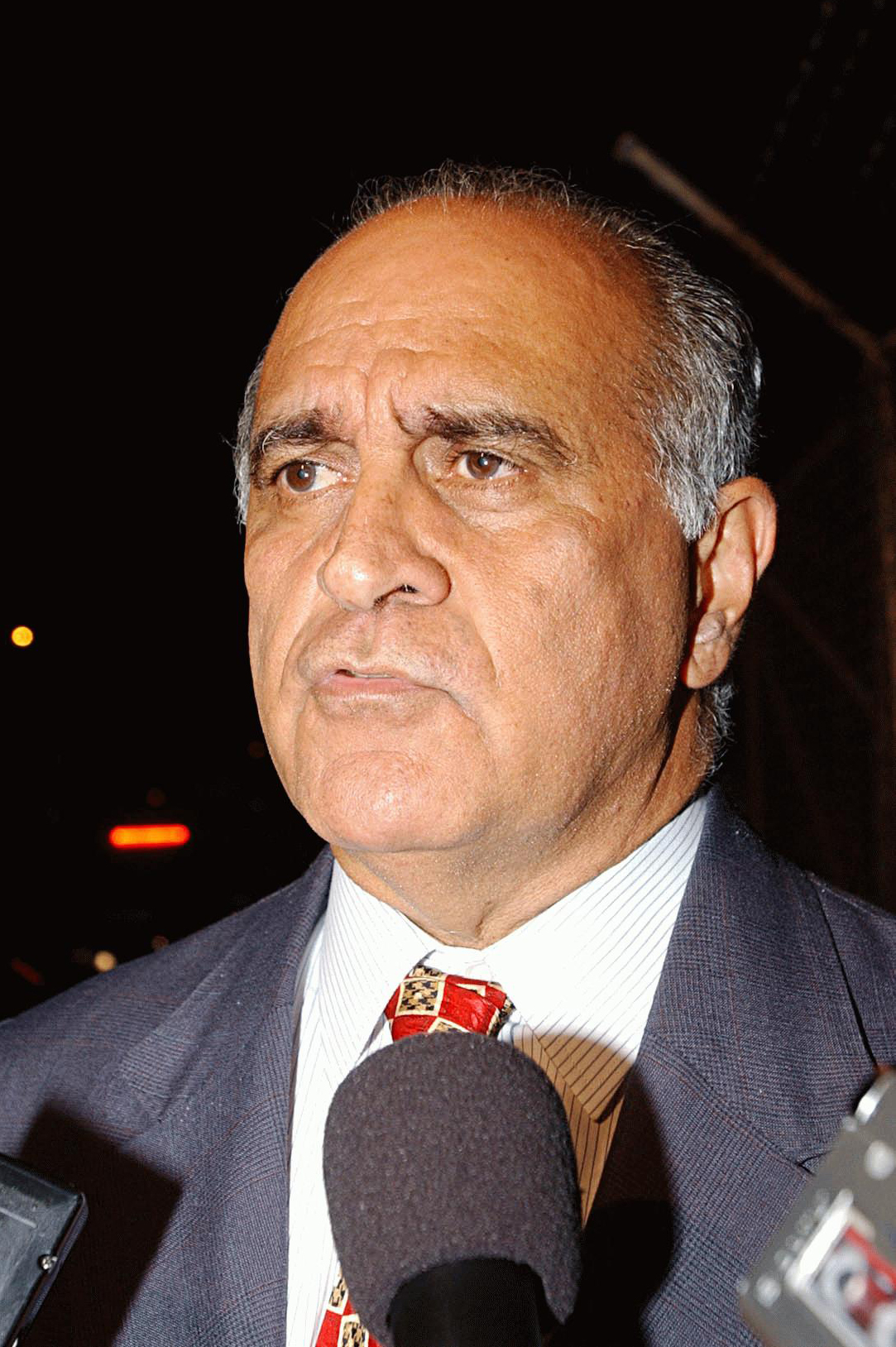
| Nominee | Jaques Wagner | Paulo Souto |
| Party | PT | DEM |
| Popular vote | 4.101.115 | 1.033.597 |
| Percentage | 63,38% | 16,09% |
Governor before election
Jaques Wagner
PT
Elected Governor
Jaques Wagner
PT

The 2010 Bahia gubernatorial election was held on October 3 as part of the general elections in Brazil. In this election, Bahian citizens eligible to vote decided incumbent Governor Jaques Wagner, of the center-left Workers' Party, should receive a new four-year term. His main challengers were former Governor Paulo Souto, of the right wing Democrats, and Minister for National Integration Geddel Vieira Lima, of centrist Brazilian Democratic Movement Party.

== Opinion polling ==
Scenario 2010

| Date | Institute | Candidate | | | None / Undecided |
| Date | Institute | Jaques Wagner (PT) | Paulo Souto (DEM) | Geddel Vieira (PMDB) | None / Undecided |
|---|---|---|---|---|---|
| December 14–18, 2009 | Ibope/TV Bahia | 49% | 18% | 12% | 2% |

First scenario

| Date | Institute | Candidate | | | | None / Undecided |
| Date | Institute | Jaques Wagner (PT) | Paulo Souto (DEM) | Geddel Vieira (PMDB) | Hilton Coelho (PSOL) | None / Undecided |
|---|---|---|---|---|---|---|
| December 14–18, 2009 | Datafolha | 39% | 24% | 11% | 1% | 25% |

Second scenario

| Date | Institute | Candidate | | | | | None / Undecided |
| Date | Institute | Jaques Wagner (PT) | Paulo Souto (DEM) | João Henrique (PMDB) | Luiz Bassuma (PV) | Hilton Coelho (PSOL) | None / Undecided |
|---|---|---|---|---|---|---|---|
| December 14–18, 2009 | Datafolha | 41% | 25% | 6% | 1% | 0% | 26% |

Third scenario

| Date | Institute | Candidate | | | | | None / Undecided |
| Date | Institute | Jaques Wagner (PT) | ACM Neto (DEM) | Geddel Vieira (PMDB) | Hilton Coelho (PSOL) | Luiz Bassuma (PV) | None / Undecided |
|---|---|---|---|---|---|---|---|
| December 14–18, 2009 | Datafolha | 43% | 14% | 13% | 2% | 1% | 28% |

Fourth scenario

| Date | Institute | Candidate | | | | | | | None / Undecided |
| Date | Institute | Jaques Wagner (PT) | Paulo Souto (DEM) | Geddel Vieira (PMDB) | César Borges (PR) | Lídice da Mata (PSB) | Hilton Coelho (PSOL) | Luiz Bassuma (PV) | None / Undecided |
|---|---|---|---|---|---|---|---|---|---|
| December 14–18, 2009 | Datafolha | 39% | 22% | 10% | 2% | 2% | 1% | 0% | 24% |
