= Nelson Leal =

Brazilian politician (born 1970)

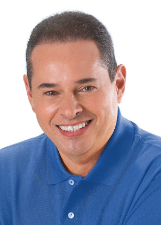
- Leal in 2022

Member of the Legislative Assembly of Bahia
- Incumbent
- Assumed office 1 February 1999

Personal details
- Born: 15 March 1970 (age 56)
- Party: Progressistas (since 2018)

Nelson Souza Leal (born 15 March 1970) is a Brazilian politician serving as a member of the Legislative Assembly of Bahia since 1999. From 2019 to 2021, he served as president of the Assembly.
