= Plínio de Arruda Sampaio Jr. =

Brazilian economist

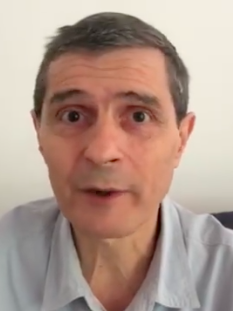

Personal details
- Party: PSOL
- Other political affiliations: PT (formerly)
- Parent: Plínio de Arruda Sampaio (father)
- Education: University of São Paulo (B.A.); State University of Campinas (M.A.), (Ph.D)

Plínio de Arruda Sampaio Jr., sometimes simply referred to as Plininho, is a Brazilian economist, academic, and political figure. He is a retired professor of economics at the State University of Campinas in São Paulo, one of the top-ranked universities in Brazil and Latin America. During his career, Arruda Sampaio Jr.'s work primarily focused on the economic history of Brazil, developmentalism, and political economy. He has also served on the editorial board of Brasil de Fato, a left-wing publication.

In 2018, he attempted to run for President of Brazil as a member of the Socialism and Liberty Party (PSOL), but was rejected during the nomination process in favor of labor leader Guilherme Boulos.

== Life and academic career ==
Arruda Sampaio Jr. was born to prolific politician Plínio de Arruda Sampaio, who was involved in politics for almost six decades. Arruda Sampaio Jr. attended the School of Economics, Business and Accounting of the University of São Paulo (FEA-USP), where he completed his undergraduate education. Arruda Sampaio Jr. would go on to obtain a master's degree in economics and a doctorate in applied economics from the State University of Campinas.

As an economist, Sampaio has been critical of "left-developmentalism", arguing that "its origin subordinated to the business logic of international capital" and is thus incompatible with socialism. During the COVID-19 pandemic in Brazil, Arruda Sampaio Jr. advocated for social distancing measures coupled with economic relief to stop the spread of the virus.

== Political career ==
=== Early political career ===
Plínio de Arruda Sampaio Jr. ran for municipal office in São Paulo in 2004 as a member of the Workers' Party (PT). He sought the office of Mayor of São Paulo, losing the PT nomination to Marta Suplicy. His left-wing allies alleged unfair favoritism towards Suplicy during the nomination contest.

Arruda Sampaio Jr. would later leave the PT altogether, decrying what he described as the "ultra-conservative character of the Lula government". Unlike many on the left, Arruda Sampaio Jr. did not consider the impeachment of Dilma Rousseff to be a "coup", arguing that Michel Temer's presidency was merely an extension of Dilma's.

=== 2018 presidential candidacy ===
In the 2018 presidential election, Arruda Sampaio Jr. entered the race, hoping to be the nominee of the Socialism and Liberty Party (PSOL). Arruda Sampaio Jr. argued that PSOL needed to distance itself from the embattled PT and chart its own course as a party of the left. Labor leader Guilherme Boulos, who eventually received the party's nomination, was seen by Arruda Sampaio Jr. as being too close to former President Luiz Inácio Lula da Silva. At the party convention, Arruda Sampaio Jr. received 27 votes in favor of his nomination, compared to the 87 received by Boulos and the 7 votes received by former CUT official Hamilton Assis.

== Selected works ==
- Entre a nação e a barbárie: os dilemas do capitalismo dependente ("Between the nation and barbarism: the dilemmas of dependent capitalism") - 1990
- Capitalismo em crise: a natureza e dinâmica da crise econômica mundial ("Capitalism in Crisis: the nature and dynamics of the world economic crisis") - 2009
