= Hilton Coelho =

Brazilian historian, civil servant, unionist and politician

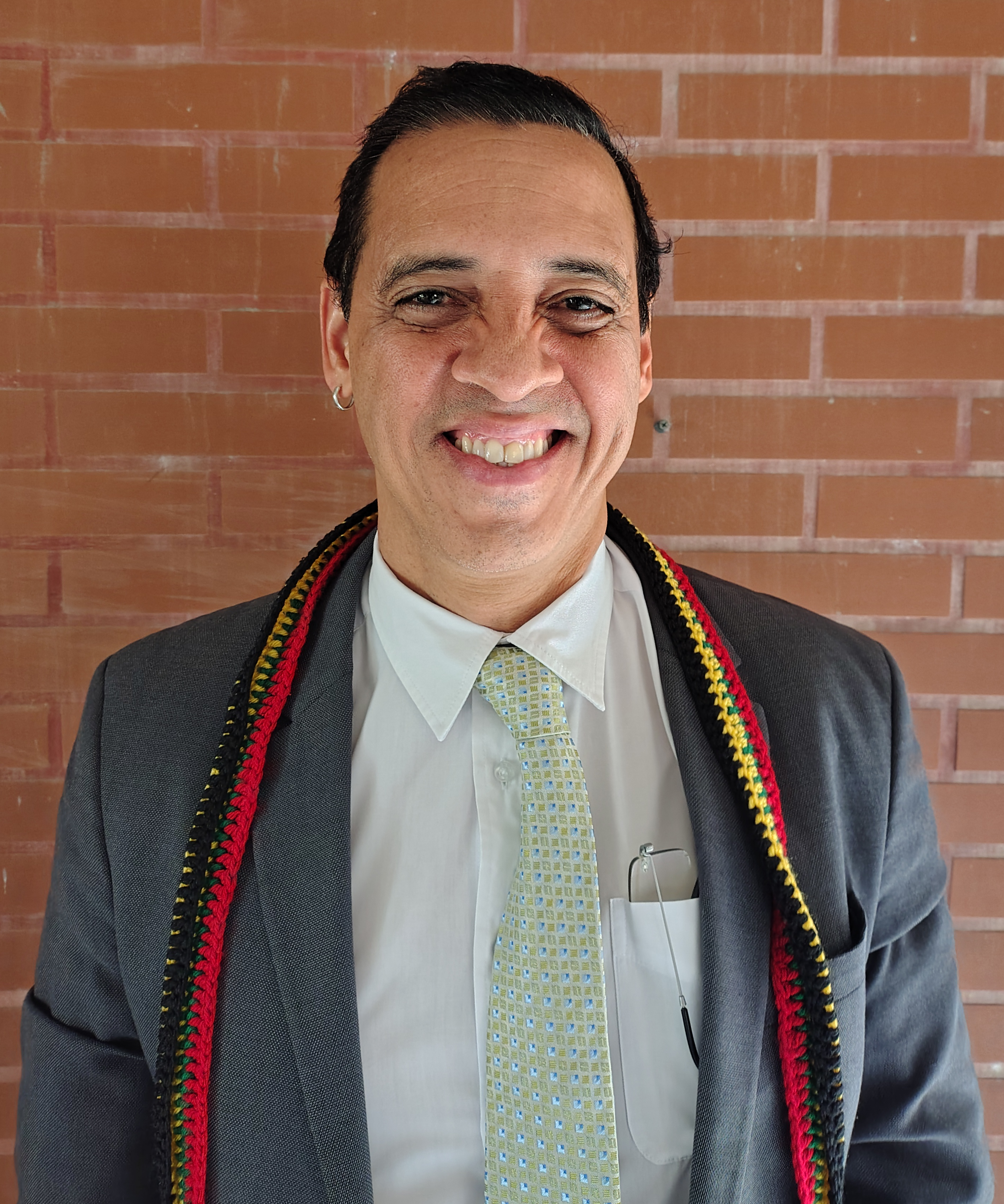
- Coelho in 2025

Member of the Legislative Assembly of Bahia
- Incumbent
- Assumed office February 1, 2019

Member of the Salvador City Council
- In office February 1, 2013 – January 31, 2019

Personal details
- Born: June 22, 1971 (age 55)
- Party: PSOL
- Education: Federal University of Bahia

Hilton Coelho introducing himself in December 2025

Hilton Barros Coelho (born June 22, 1971) is a historian, civil servant, labor activist and Brazilian politician. A member of the Socialism and Liberty Party (PSOL), Coelho was elected to the Legislative Assembly of Bahia (ALBA) in 2018.

== Biography ==
In high school, Coelho was involved in student activism, and presided over the Student Union of the Federal Technical School of Bahia. Coelho later graduated from the Federal University of Bahia, where he graduated with a master's degree in history.

In 2006, Coelho was a candidate for Governor of Bahia, and in 2008 ran for Mayor of Salvador. In the latter election, he headed the Socialist Left Front, and obtained 51 thousand votes. In 2010, he was a candidate for state deputy, and reached almost 25 thousand votes.

He was elected a member of the Salvador City Council in 2012, running with Hamilton Assis heading the PSOL municipal ticket. He received 16,408 votes (1.27% of those valid), running as a member of the "Enough of Selling Our City" coalition (PSOL-PCB).

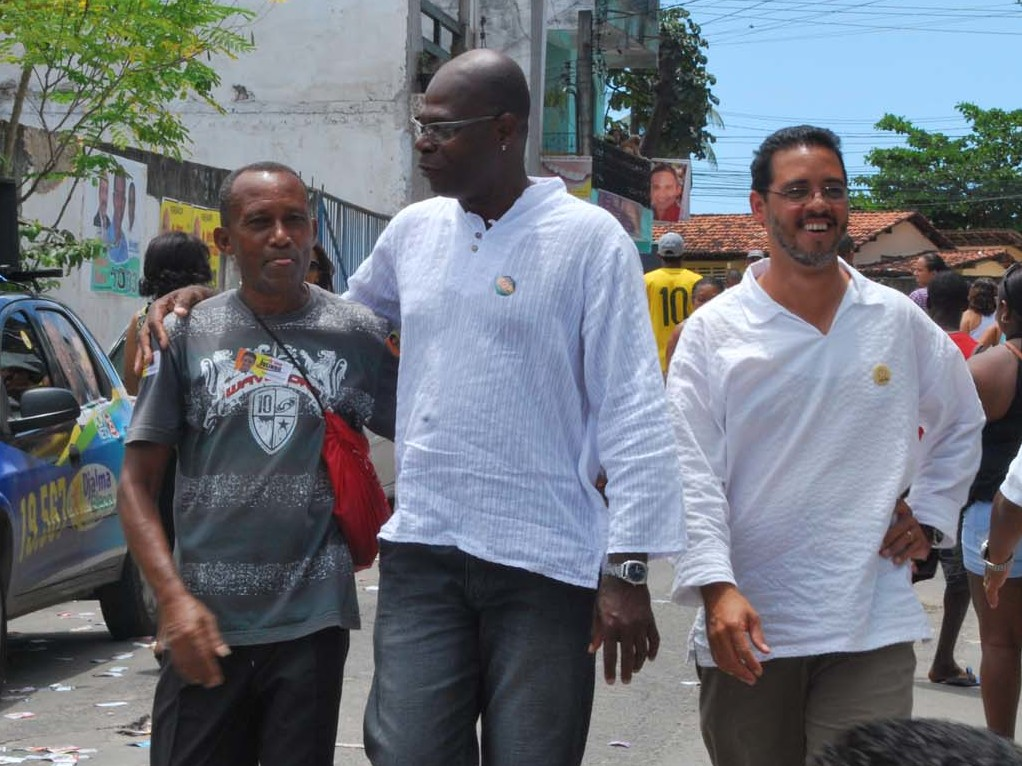
Coelho with Hamilton Assis.

After being reelected in 2016, Coelho decided to run for the Legislative Assembly of Bahia, and became the first ever PSOL state deputy in Bahia. In 2020, he once again unsuccessfully ran for Mayor of Salvador. His running-mate was Rosana Almedia, a local coordinator for the National Housing Struggle Movement (MNLM) and PSOL organizer.
