= Hamilton Assis =

Brazilian politician

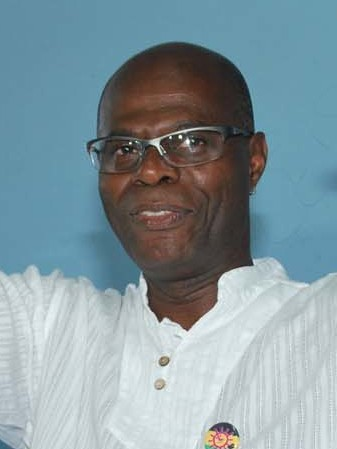

Personal details
- Born: January 19, 1963 (age 63)
- Party: PT (1982-2005); PSOL (2005-present)
- Occupation: Politician, teacher, and social movement leader

Hamilton Moreira de Assis (born January 19, 1963), known as Hamilton Assis, is a Brazilian labor leader, left-wing activist, teacher, and politician from Salvador, Bahia. A former director of the Central Única dos Trabalhadores (CUT) in Bahia, he has run for office several times as a member of the Socialism and Liberty Party (PSOL), most recently in 2018 where he stood as an unsuccessful candidate for the party's presidential nomination. Over the course of his career, Assis has held positions in the Bahia chapters of both PSOL and the Workers' Party (PT).

== Biography ==
=== Early life and political activity ===
Born in the neighborhood of Pau Miúdo in 1963, Assis spent his childhood in the neighborhood of Pau da Lima in Salvador, Bahia. He became politically active in the Ecclesial Base Communities and was involved in neighborhood associations in Salvador in the early 1980s. In 1982, he joined the newly-formed Workers' Party (PT), and occupied positions in the party's state leadership in Bahia. During this period, Assis was also involved in the Bahian Black Movement. Assist served as director of the Central Única dos Trabalhadores, the country's primary labor organization, in Bahia between 1993 and 1996.

In 2005, Hamilton Assis participated in the founding of the Socialism and Liberty Party (PSOL), a left-wing party created by PT dissidents. From 2006 to 2007, Assis served at the helm of the PSOL state director in Bahia. In 2010, he became leader of the PSOL's municipal branch in Salvador.

=== 2010 vice presidential candidacy and aftermath ===
In 2010, he was chosen by former federal deputy Plínio de Arruda Sampaio to serve as his vice presidential running mate on the PSOL slate that year. As a vice presidential candidate, Assis criticized Marina Silva, then a leading presidential candidate, by accusing her of inconsistency.

Assis also criticized the media for largely ignoring the candidacy of Arruda Sampaio. Speaking in praise of Arruda Sampaio, Assis stated that there "is a tendency to treat Plínio as an exotic figure, in addition to people perceiving a prejudice against older people as well... But anyone who pays attention to what he says will realize that he is a brave man, full of political qualities and with the necessary vigor to promote great changes in Brazil".

During the vice presidential debate, Assis denounced institutional racism in Brazil and stated that the Pacifying Police Units (UPP) in Rio de Janeiro have brought "terror to the well-being of communities". Additionally, Assis spoke out in favor of expanding and protecting abortion rights.

=== 2012 mayoral candidacy and aftermath ===
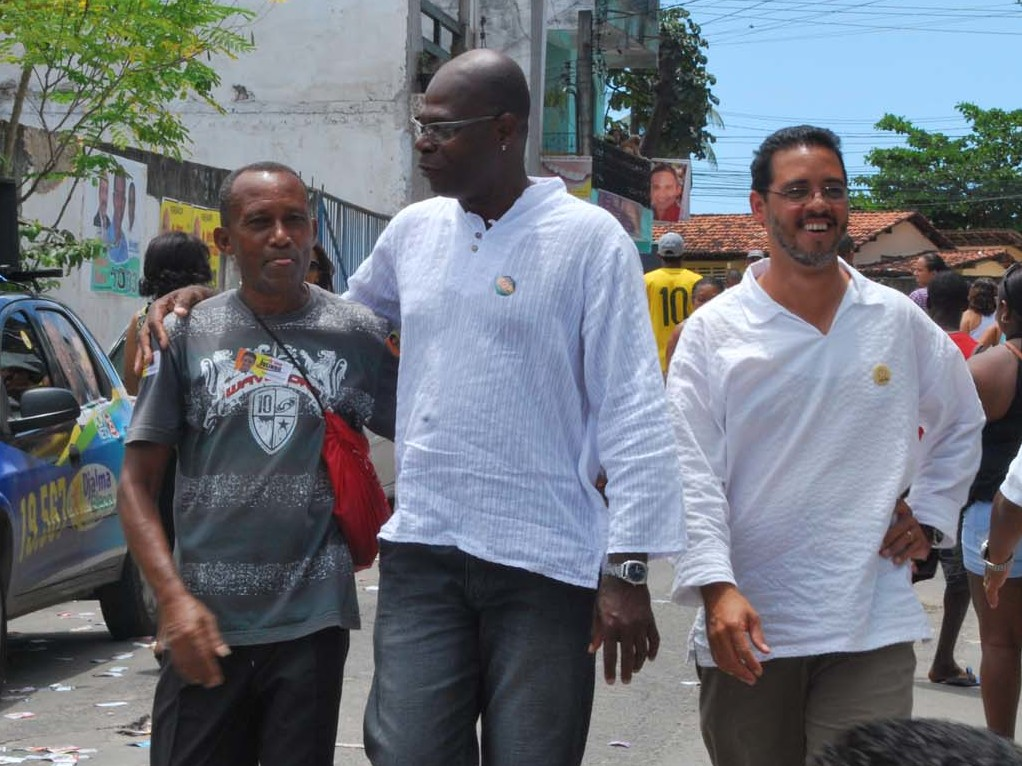
Assis campaigning with Hilton Coelho.

In 2012, Assis mounted a campaign for Mayor of Salvador in an alliance with the PCB and PSTU, and received 33,650 votes. During the campaign, he prioritized renewing urban infrastructure. He did not support a candidate in the second round of the election. According to Jornal A Tarde, Assis and PSOL were harmed in the election by only pledging to take individual contributions, thereby limiting their fundraising ability. While Assis lost, his campaign in 2012 coincided with the election of the first-ever PSOL alderman on the City Council of Salvador, Hilton Coelho.

In 2014, he mounted a campaign to serve as Senator for Bahia. During his senatorial campaign, Assis endorsed abortion legalization, the decriminalization of some drugs, the creation of a unicameral federal legislature, and the public financing of elections. Additionally, he endorsed quotas for Afro-Brazilians to advance racial equality and opposed lowering the age of criminal responsibility.

In 2016, Assis stood for a seat on the City Council of Salvador. He had considered running for the mayoralty again, but PSOL instead chose to nominate Bahia State University professor Fábio Nogueira.

Assis was a strong critic of Michel Temer during his presidency, accusing Temer of trying to push through a pension reform plan to remove workers' rights. Assis stated that the government is "proposing an increase in the contribution ceiling for 45 years and the age of 65. If this equation confirms, no worker will be able to retire in this country and we will see a situation analogous to slavery. The enslaved workers worked until they died!"

=== 2018 presidential candidacy ===
In 2018, Hamilton Assis chose to run for the presidency, though PSOL ended up nominated Guilherme Boulos instead. Assis criticized the party's leadership for perceived unfair treatment in favor of Boulos at the expense of internal democracy, and stated that PSOL should be built "from scratch" to keep it in touch with social movements. At the party convention, Assis received seven votes in favor of his nomination, compared to 87 for Boulos and 27 for Plínio de Arruda Sampaio Jr., the son of the late Arruda Sampaio.

== Personal life ==
Assis is a teacher at the municipal education system in Salvador, where he works as a pedagogical coordinator, and holds a master's degree in education. Assis is married to Meire Reis, a feminist activist.
