= Félix Mendonça Júnior =

Brazilian politician (born 1963)

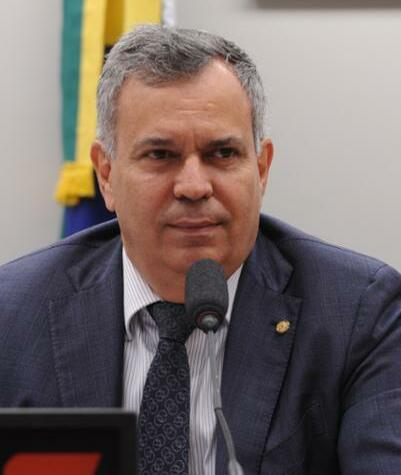

Member of the Chamber of Deputies
- Incumbent
- Assumed office 1 February 2011
- Constituency: Bahia

Personal details
- Born: Félix de Almeida Mendonça Júnior; 29 November 1963 (age 62) Itabuna, Bahia, Brazil
- Party: PDT (since 2009)
- Other political affiliations: PTB (2001–2005); PFL (2005–2007); DEM (2007–2009)
- Parent: Félix Mendonça (father)
- Education: Federal University of Bahia

Félix de Almeida Mendonça Júnior (born 29 November 1963) is a Brazilian politician serving as a member of the Chamber of Deputies since 2011. He is the son of Félix Mendonça.
