= Rui Costa (politician) =

Brazilian politician

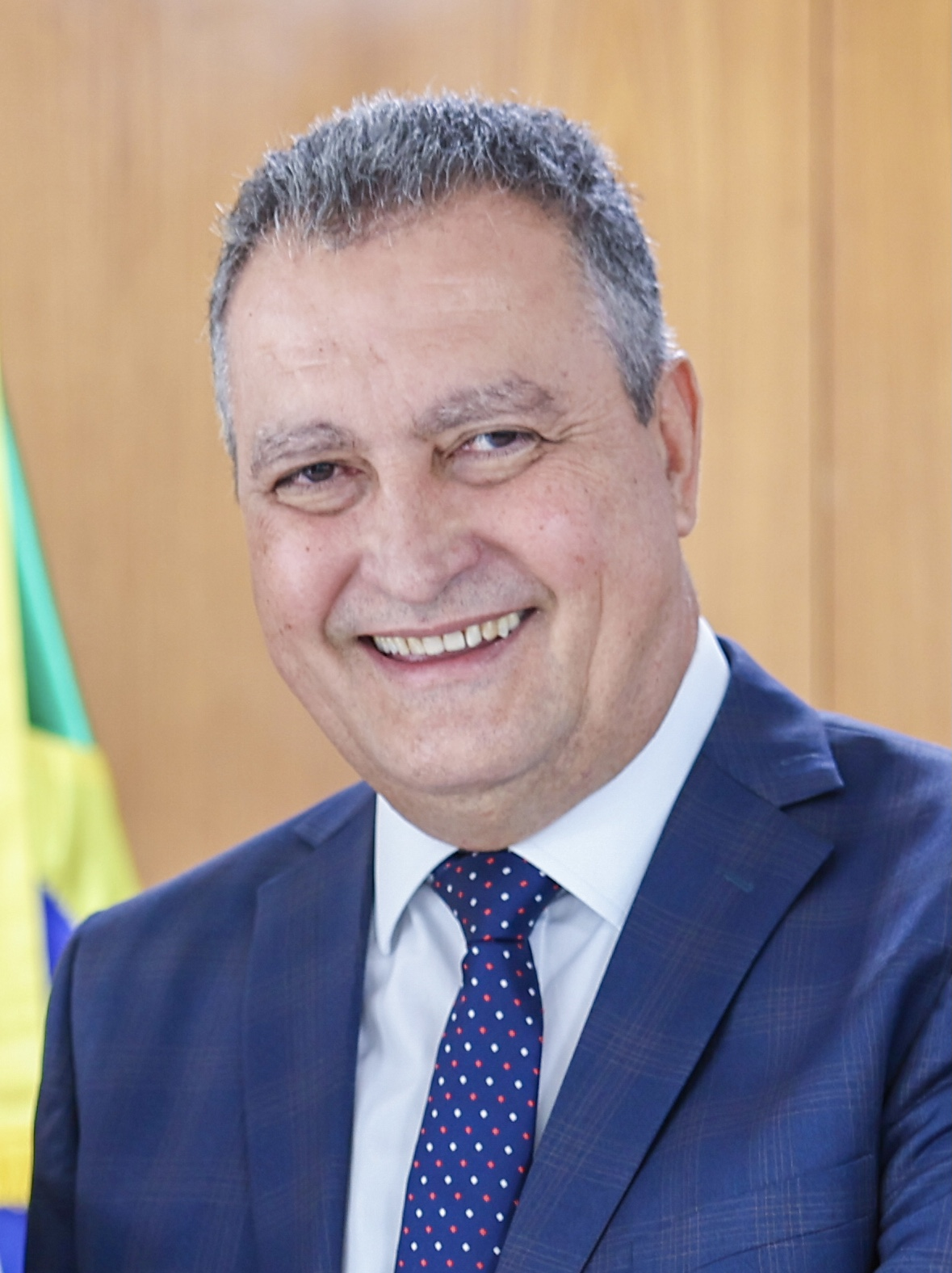
- Costa in 2023

Senator-elect for Bahia
- Assuming office 1 February 2027

Chief of Staff of the Presidency
- In office 1 January 2023 – 2 April 2026
- President: Luiz Inácio Lula da Silva
- Preceded by: Ciro Nogueira
- Succeeded by: Miriam Belchior

51st Governor of Bahia
- In office 1 January 2015 – 31 December 2022
- Vice Governor: João Leão
- Preceded by: Jaques Wagner
- Succeeded by: Jerônimo Rodrigues

Member of the Chamber of Deputies
- In office 1 February 2011 – 31 December 2014

Personal details
- Born: 18 January 1963 (age 63) Salvador, Bahia, Brazil
- Party: PT (1980–present)
- Spouse: Aline Peixoto
- Children: 4
- Education: Federal University of Bahia
- Profession: Economist

Rui Costa dos Santos (Brazilian Portuguese: [ʁuj kɔstɐ dus sɐ̃tus]; born 18 January 1963) is a Brazilian economist and politician who has served as the Chief of Staff of the Presidency since 1 January 2023. He previously served as governor of Bahia from January 2015 to December 2022. He is affiliated with the Workers' Party (PT).

In January 2007, invited by the Governor Jaques Wagner, Rui Costa took over the Secretariat of Institutional Relations (Serin), where he stayed until 2010. In Serin, Rui developed a new model of integration between the executive and legislative state with federal entities and social movements. The initiative was enhanced with the launch of the Institutional Relationship System (SRI), designed to speed up the progress of claims and standardize care.

In 2010 he was elected federal deputy for the PT, again with the highest number of votes of the PT bench.

Rui Costa was chosen as the PT candidate for the State of Bahia in elections in 2014, and elected in the 1st round with 54.53% of the votes, against 37.39% of his main opponent, Paulo Souto. In 2018, he was reelected with over 75% of the votes in the first round, easily defeating Zé Ronaldo.

Rui Costa is considered a moderate among his party. As governor, he privatized the state owned supermarket, approved a pension reform, implemented public–private partnerships for education and health and supported electoral alliances with the PSDB and Democrats, center right historical rivals of PT, in the 2022 presidential election in order to defeat Bolsonaro.

== Criticism ==
Following the 2015 killing of 12 men, including four teenagers, by state police, Amnesty International published a Huffington Post article on its website, reporting that official figures from the Annual Report of Public Security, reveal that, each day, "at least six people are killed by police officers in Brazil" and that the true number is likely higher, as "most states across the country prefer to keep these alarming figures under wraps." Costa was widely criticized for his public response, including a false narrative of events and declaring the police as "heroes".

The ill-conceived comparison of a mass killing with an adrenaline-pumping football match is a sad illustration of the public security problems still experienced in Brazil – where mostly poor, young black men pay the price for the actions of a violent, militarized and poorly trained police force that has gone unchecked for far too long.

— Police killings in Brazil: 'My taxes paid for the bullet that killed my grandson'

Al-Jazeera also reported the killings and that the largest Black population in Brazil, resides in Costa's home, the Bahia state capitol, Salvador da Bahia, and that "80 percent of those killed by police in Brazil are young, black and poor."

Political offices
Office established	State Secretary of Institutional Affairs of Bahia; 2007–2010	Succeeded by Paulo Cezar Lisboa
Preceded by Eva Chiavon	Chief of Staff of the Governor of Bahia; 2012–2014	Succeeded by Bruno Dauster
Preceded by Jaques Wagner	Governor of Bahia; 2015–2022	Succeeded by Jerônimo Rodrigues
Preceded by Ciro Nogueira	Chief of Staff of the Presidency; 2023–2026	Succeeded by Miriam Belchior
