= Aiquara =

Municipality of Bahia, Brazil

- Municipality
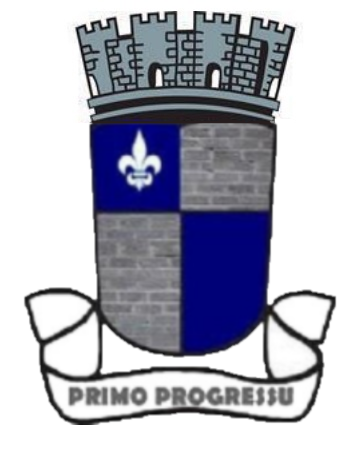
- Flag Coat of arms

- Location in Brazil
- Coordinates: 14°07′S 39°52′W
- Country: Brazil
- Region: Nordeste
- State: Bahia

Population (2020)
  - Total: 4,416
- Time zone: UTC−3 (BRT)

Aiquara is a municipality in the state of Bahia in the North-East region of Brazil.

== See also ==
- List of municipalities in Bahia
