= Lauro de Freitas =

Municipality of Bahia, Brazil

Lauro de Freitas Município de Lauro de Freitas
- Municipality
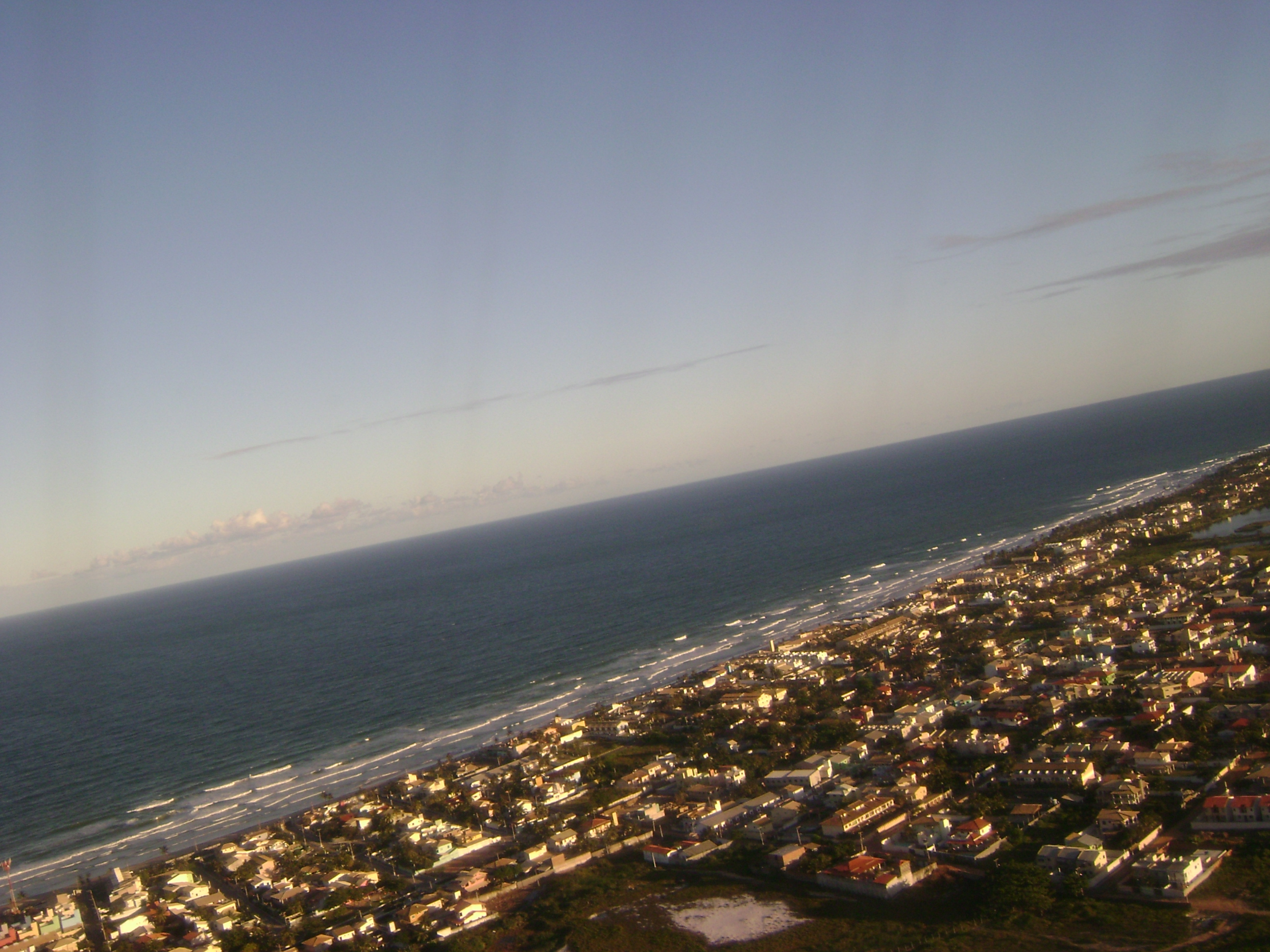
- Aerial view of Lauro de Freitas

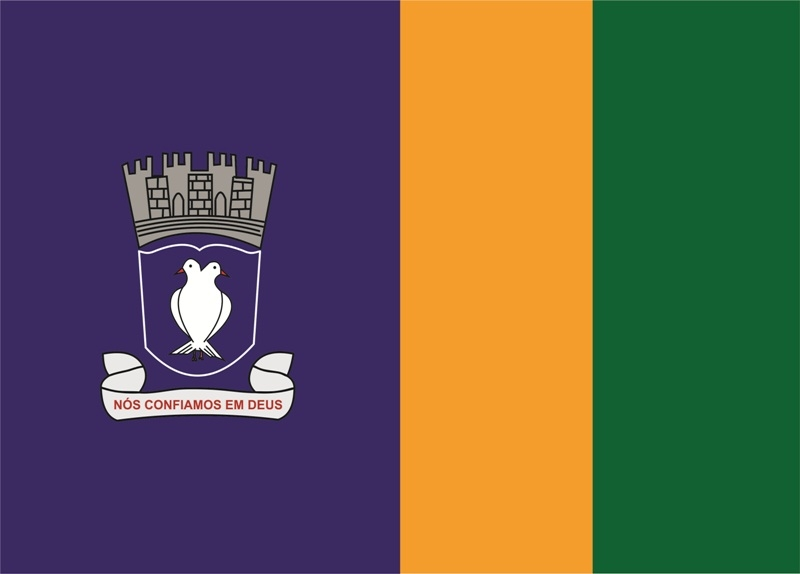
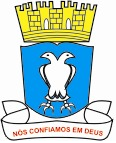
- Flag Coat of arms

- Location of Lauro de Freitas in Bahia

- Location of Lauro de Freitas in Brazil
- Coordinates: 12.893889°S 38.326944°W
- Country: Brazil
- Region: Northeast
- State: Bahia
- Founded: July 31, 1962

Government
  - Mayor: Débora Regis

Area
  - Total: 57.66 km^{2} (22.26 sq mi)

Population (2022 Brazilian census)
  - Total: 203,331
  - Estimate (2025): 219,564
  - Density: 3,526/km^{2} (9,133/sq mi)
- Demonym: lauro-freitense
- Time zone: UTC−3 (BRT)

Lauro de Freitas is a municipality in Bahia, Brazil. It covers 57.66 km^{2} (22.26 mi^{2}) and a population of 203,331 (2022 Census). Lauro de Freitas has a population density of 3,376 inhabitants per square kilometer. It is located 15 km (9.3 mi) from the state capital of Bahia, Salvador.

Until July 31, 1962 it was a district of Salvador, named Santo Amaro de Ipitanga; after acquiring city status, it changed its name as an homage to politician and engineer Lauro Farani Pedreira de Freitas (1901–1950), who lived there most of his life and died in a plane crash. Vilas do Atlântico, a wealthy neighborhood, is located in Lauro de Freitas.

== History ==
Around the year 1000, the region currently occupied by the municipality was invaded by Tupi peoples from the Amazon, who expelled its former inhabitants, the Tapuias, to the interior. In the 16th century, when the first Europeans arrived in the region, it was inhabited by the Tupinambás.

=== Recent period ===
Mayor Márcio Araponga's administration received a 92% disapproval rating in a 2015 poll. During that period, eleven schools were closed, the elderly clinic inaugurated in 2014 was shut down, the only maternity hospital in the municipality was closed, the Unidade de Saúde Avançada (USA) of the Serviço de Atendimento Móvel de Urgência (SAMU) operated without doctors (who had been hired without civil service entrance examination for eight years and were dismissed in October 2016), and there was an attempt to privatize municipal public parking lots (blue zone). The deputy mayor announced on July 21, 2016, a break with his then running mate, becoming part of the opposition. The closure of 4 health units was also reported. In the 2016 municipal elections, the incumbent candidate was Mateus Reis (PSDB) and the highest vote count was received by former mayor Moema Gramacho (PT), who won the election with 52.32% of the valid votes. In November 2016, the mayor closed the Civil Defense department, leaving the population unprotected. Heavy rains that occurred after the closure of the civil defense left the population in panic. Due to strong rejection by the population and his own party, the mayor announced that he would change parties.

In 2020, the city hall moved to the Lauro de Freitas Administrative Center (CALF), a complex of buildings constructed to house the main municipal departments.

== Subdivisions ==
Lauro de Freitas has, as its only district, the city center. After a new cartographic base that removed the situation of the municipality having a single Código de Endereçamento Postal (CEP), it was divided into 19 neighborhoods: Ipitanga, Vila Praiana, Vilas do Atlântico, Aracuí, Pitangueiras, Buraquinho, Centro, Recreio Ipitanga, Itinga, Portão, Caixa d'Água, Caji, Vida Nova, Quingoma, Parque São Paulo, Capelão, Areia Branca, Jambeiro and Barro Duro.

== Services ==
The monastery of Priorado São Norberto runs the Centro Comunitário Cristo Libertador, which supports various charities throughout the region.

== Notable people ==
- Ailton, football player
- Damião Experiença, outsider musician
- Geferson, football player
