= Coração de Maria =

Municipality of Bahia State, Brazil

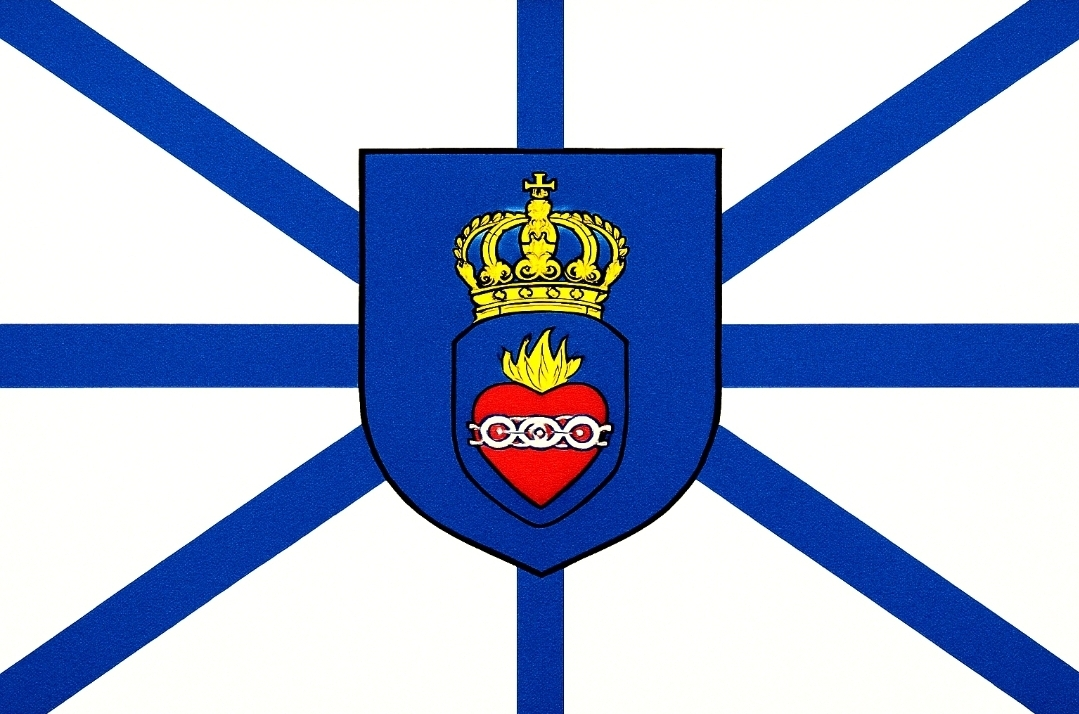
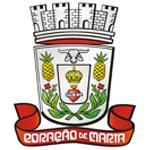
- Flag Coat of arms

- Coordinates: 12°13′58″S 38°45′00″W
- Region: Nordeste
- State: Bahia
- Founded: 23 July

Population (2020)
  - Total: 22,495
- Time zone: UTC−3 (BRT)
- Postal code: 2908903

Coração de Maria is a municipality in the state of Bahia in the North-East region of Brazil.

== See also ==
- List of municipalities in Bahia
