= Otto Alencar =

Brazilian politician

Senator from Bahia
- Incumbent
- Assumed office February 1, 2015
- Preceded by: João Durval Carneiro

Vice-Governor of Bahia
- In office January 1, 2011 – December 31, 2014

Governor of Bahia
- In office April 5, 2002 – December 31, 2002

Vice-Governor of Bahia
- In office January 1, 1999 – April 5, 2002

Personal details
- Born: August 28, 1947 (age 79) Ruy Barbosa, Bahia
- Party: Social Democratic Party
- Children: Otto Alencar Filho; Daniel Alencar

Otto Roberto Mendonça de Alencar (born August 28, 1947) is a Brazilian politician and physician. He has represented Bahia in the Federal Senate since 2015, being re-elected for another 8-year term in the 2022 Brazilian general election. He earned his medical degree from the Federal University of Bahia. Previously he was vice-governor and governor of Bahia. He is a member of the Social Democratic Party. State Present of Social Democratic Party on Bahia
