= Jaques Wagner =

Brazilian politician

- Official portrait

Senator for Bahia
- Incumbent
- Assumed office 1 February 2019
- Preceded by: Roberto Muniz
Ministerial positions
Chief of Staff of the Presidency
In office 2 October 2015 – 16 March 2016
President	Dilma Rousseff
Preceded by	Aloizio Mercadante
Succeeded by	Eliseu Padilha
Minister of Defence
In office 1 January 2015 – 2 October 2015
President	Dilma Rousseff
Preceded by	Celso Amorim
Succeeded by	Aldo Rebelo
Minister of Institutional Affairs
In office 20 July 2005 – 31 March 2006
President	Luiz Inácio Lula da Silva
Preceded by	Aldo Rebelo
Succeeded by	Tarso Genro
Minister of Labour and Employment
In office 1 January 2003 – 23 January 2004
President	Luiz Inácio Lula da Silva
Preceded by	Paulo Jobim Filho
Succeeded by	Ricardo Berzoini

50th Governor of Bahia
- In office 1 January 2007 – 31 December 2014
- Vice Governor: Edmundo Santos (2007–2010); Otto Alencar (2011–2014)
- Preceded by: Paulo Souto
- Succeeded by: Rui Costa

Member of the Chamber of Deputies
- In office 1 February 1991 – 1 January 2003
- Constituency: Bahia

Personal details
- Born: 16 March 1951 (age 75) Rio de Janeiro, Brazil
- Party: PT (since 1980)
- Spouse: Fátima Mendonça (m. 1990)
- Education: Pontifical Catholic University of Rio de Janeiro (dropped out)

Jaques Wagner (Brazilian Portuguese: [ˈʒaks ˈvaɡneʁ]; born 16 March 1951) is a Brazilian politician who was Governor of Bahia from 2007 to 2015 and Minister of Defence in 2015.

Wagner, whose parents were Jewish immigrants from Poland, was born in Rio de Janeiro in 1951. In his youth, he was a member of the Labor Zionist youth organization Habonim Dror. He was a founding member of the Workers' Party (PT), as well as the Central Única dos Trabalhadores (CUT), a union which has organized more than seven million members. He won reelection in the 2010 Bahia gubernatorial election.

Since 2019, he serves as a Senator for the state of Bahia.

Political offices
Preceded by Aldo Rebelo	Minister of Institutional Affairs; 2005–2006	Succeeded by Tarso Genro
Preceded by Paulo Jobim Filho	Minister of Labour and Employment; 2003–2004	Succeeded by Ricardo Berzoini
Preceded by Paulo Souto	Governor of Bahia; 2007–2015	Succeeded by Rui Costa
Preceded by Celso Amorim	Minister of Defence; 2015	Succeeded by Aldo Rebelo
Preceded by Aloizio Mercadante	Chief of Staff of the Presidency; 2015–2016	Succeeded by Luiz Inácio Lula da Silva
