= Social Democratic Party (Brazil, 2011) =

Social Democratic Party Partido Social Democrático
- Abbreviation: PSD
- President: Gilberto Kassab
- Founder: Gilberto Kassab
- Founded: 21 March 2011
- Split from: Democrats (mainly); PSDB (minority)
- Newspaper: Diálogos no Espaço Democrático
- Think tank: Espaço Democrático
- Youth wing: PSD Jovem
- Women's wing: PSD Mulher
- Membership: 411,608
- Ideology: Economic liberalism; Big tent
- Political position: Centre to centre-right
- International affiliation: Centrist Democrat International
- Colours: Blue, green, and yellow
- TSE Identification Number: 55
- Chamber of Deputies: 48 / 513
- Federal Senate: 14 / 81
- City Councillors: 5,694 / 56,810

Website
- psd.org.br

The Social Democratic Party (Portuguese: Partido Social Democrático, PSD) is a political party in Brazil led by Gilberto Kassab and uniting dissidents from various political parties, especially the Democrats, Brazilian Social Democracy Party and Party of National Mobilization.

The party has become a major force for centrism in Brazil and commonly unites with both left-wing and right-wing parties. In this way, the party managed to have members occupying positions in ministries and important secretariats in the governments of presidents Dilma Rousseff, Michel Temer, and Luiz Inácio Lula da Silva. As such, PSD has been considered by political scientists as a big tent party and part of the Centrão. While one of the youngest parties in Brazil, PSD's pragmatic nature has allowed it to grow exponentially, becoming one of the largest parties in Brazil.

After the 2024 Brazilian municipal elections, it has become the party with the most number of mayors in Brazil.

== History ==
The party was founded in 2011 by São Paulo mayor Gilberto Kassab, bringing together dissidents from Kassab’s former party, the Democrats (DEM), and from the Brazilian Social Democracy Party (PSDB), as well as some members from the Progressive Party (PP), the Brazilian Labour Party (PTB), and others. It united politicians who opposed their parties’ “automatic opposition” to the Workers' Party (PT) and advocated for a more pragmatic stance, open to dialogue with the government, while positioning itself as an alternative to the Brazilian Democratic Movement Party (PMDB), as the traditional force in big tent politics. The foundation was criticized by members of the opposition political parties, primarily the Democrats (DEM), as supporting the government. Many Democrats members accused the PSD of being created by Luiz Inácio Lula da Silva to destroy the DEM and deliver on a promise made to Workers' Party (PT) supporters to "exterminate the DEM from the Brazilian political scenario". The party was criticized for having a vague program, making references to economic freedom, political reform and welfare, and being hard to differentiate from other political parties except those on the hard left. According to Kassab, "We are neither a right-wing party nor a left-wing nor a centrist party".

In many Brazilian states, the PSD took a liberal stance on economics and had good election results. The party has good relationships with major political parties such as the social democratic Brazilian Socialist Party, the national conservative Progressive Party, the centrist Brazilian Labour Party, the Christian democratic Brazilian Republican Party and the progressive Citizenship. Since its inception, the party has been associated with fusions with other parties, primarily the PP and PSB. It has endured on the Brazilian political scene, and has more representation than any political party other than the major ones. The party chaired the Finance Ministry of Brazil in Michel Temer's government, and is a major force in Brazilian politics.

However, in the state of Bahia, the party is a long-term partner of the major left-wing Workers' Party, having the running mate in the gubernatorial tickets of Rui Costa and each party supporting the other in the senate elections, with Otto Alencar and Angelo Coronel being the senators of Bahia together with the Petista Jaques Wagner.

The PSD supported the impeachment of Dilma Rousseff.

PSD elected several senators and some governors in the Brazilian Centro-Sul region in 2018, with the support of Jair Bolsonaro.

The right-wing politician, Ronaldo Caiado, stood as the PSD's candidate in the 2026 Brazilian presidential election. He got 2.18% of the vote and endorsed Flavio Bolsonaro in the second round.

== Ideology ==
Soon after its foundation, the national president of the party, Gilberto Kassab (SP), stated: "It will not be on the right, it will not be on the left, nor on the center". The foundational purpose of the PSD is the satisfaction of the interests of the lower class that had risen to the middle class position during the Workers' Party governments. The then-vice-president of the party, Guilherme Affif Domingos (SP) wrote a document with 12 party commitments, among them:

1. National Development
2. Liberty
3. Democracy and Regional Representation
4. The Right to Security of Property
5. Equal Opportunities
6. Sustainability and Technological Innovation
7. Accountability and Fiscal Responsibility
8. Freedom of the Press
9. Free Association
10. Decentralization and Federalism
11. Free Trade and Defense of Traditional Values
12. Individual Freedom and Responsibility

However, according to political scientist Rui Maluf, the absence of specific programmatic content reveals that the PSD has a typically catch-all organizational nature and that its foundation reflects the dissatisfaction of its staff with previous parties, mostly from the Democratas party.

== Notable members ==
- Gilberto Kassab, former mayor of São Paulo and Former Minister of Science, Technology, Innovation and Communications
- Eduardo Paes, former mayor of Rio de Janeiro City and gubernatorial candidate for Rio de Janeiro State in 2026.
- Ana Amelia Lemos, journalist, former senator of Republic for Rio Grande do Sul, and vice-presidential candidate for Geraldo Alckmin in 2018
- Rodrigo Pacheco, Senator for Minas Gerais and President of the Federal Senate and National Congress
- Mara Gabrilli, Senator for Sao Paulo, and vice-presidential candidate for Simone Tebet in 2022
- Hassan de Zé Cocá, State deputy from Bahia
- Eduardo Leite, Governor of Rio Grande do Sul
- Marcelo Calero, former Minister of Culture

== Election results ==
=== Presidential elections ===
Year	Candidate for President	Candidate for Vice-President	Coalition	Percentage	Result
2014	Dilma Rousseff (PT)	Michel Temer (PMDB)	With the Power of the People (PT, PMDB, PSD, PP, PR, PROS, PDT, PCdoB and PRB)	54,501,118 (51.64%)	Elected
2018	Geraldo Alckmin (PSDB)	Ana Amélia Lemos (PP)	To Unite Brazil (PSDB, PP, PTB, PSD, PRB, PR, DEM, Solidarity and PPS)	5,096,350 (4,76%)	Lost
2026	Ronaldo Caiado	Gilberto Kassab		2,598,851 (2.19%)	Lost

=== Legislative elections ===
Election	Chamber of Deputies				Federal Senate				Role in government
Election	Votes	%	Seats	+/–	Votes	%	Seats	+/–	Role in government
2014	5,967,953	6.14%	36 / 513	New	7,147,245	8.00%	3 / 81	New	Coalition
2018	5,749,008	5.85%	34 / 513	▼2	8,202,342	4.79%	7 / 81	▲4	Support
2022	8,322,183	7,55%	42 / 513	▲8	11,312,512	11.12%	10 / 81	▲3	Support
2026	9,391,321	8.25%	43 / 513	▲1	10,522,601	5.07%	5 / 81	▼5	TBA
Sources: Election Resources, Dados Eleitorais do Brasil (1982–2006)

== See also ==
- List of political parties in Brazil

Preceded by 50 – SOLP (PSOL)	Numbers of Brazilian Official Political Parties; 55 – SDP (PSD)	Succeeded by 65 – CPofB (PCdoB)
