= Legislative Assembly of Bahia =

State legislature in Brazil

Coordinates: 12°56′55″S 38°25′46″W

Legislative Assembly of Bahia Assembleia Legislativa da Bahia
- 20th Legislature (2023-2027)

Type
- Type: Unicameral

Leadership
- President: Ivana Bastos, PSD since 2021
- Leader of majority: Rosemberg Pinto, PT
- Leader of minority: Alan Sanchez, Brazil Union

Structure
- Seats: 63 deputies
- Political groups: Government (39); Brazil of Hope (17) PSD (9) PP (6) PSB (2) MDB (2) PRD (1) Avante (1) PODE (1): Independent (1); PSOL (1): Opposition (23); UNIÃO (10) PL (4) PSDB (3) Republicanos (3) Solidariedade (2) PDT (1)

Elections
- Last election: 2022 Bahia gubernatorial election
- Next election: 2026 Brazilian general election

Meeting place
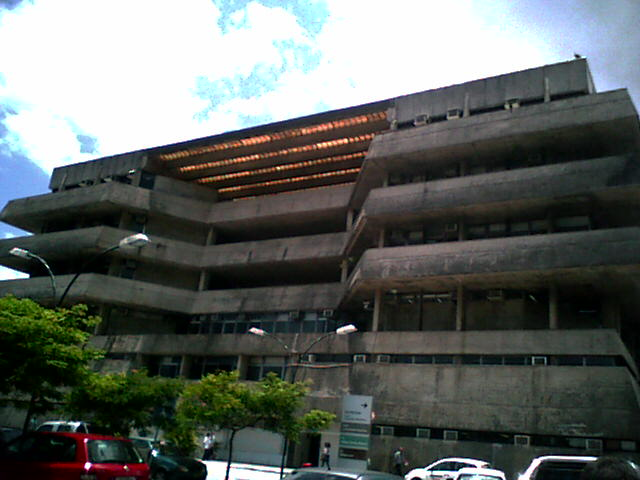
- Prédio Luís Eduardo Magalhães, Salvador

Website
- www.al.ba.gov.br

The Legislative Assembly of Bahia (Portuguese: Assembleia Legislativa da Bahia, ALBA) is the unicameral legislature of the Brazilian state of Bahia. It is currently based in the Luís Eduardo Magalhães building in the administrative centre of Bahia (Centro Administrativo da Bahia, CAB) in the Salvador neighbourhood. It has 63 state deputies elected by proportional representation.

The legislative power of Bahia began with the General Council of the Province in 1828. It had 21 members and only had the function of suggesting laws for the General Assembly of the Empire. In 1835, the Provincial Assembly was created. For the first to the 11th legislatures, the assembly sat in the Convento do Carmo. In 1858, it started to sit next to the Paço Municipal. From 1891, the assembly became bicameral with the chamber and the senate in different buildings. In 1947, during the Estado Novo regime, the legislature became unicameral again and has remained such.
