= Brazil–United States relations =

- Brazil: United States

Diplomatic mission
- Embassy of Brazil, Washington, D.C.: Embassy of the United States, Brasília

Envoy
- Brazilian Ambassador to the United States Maria Luiza Ribeiro Viotti: American Ambassador to Brazil Gabriel Escobar

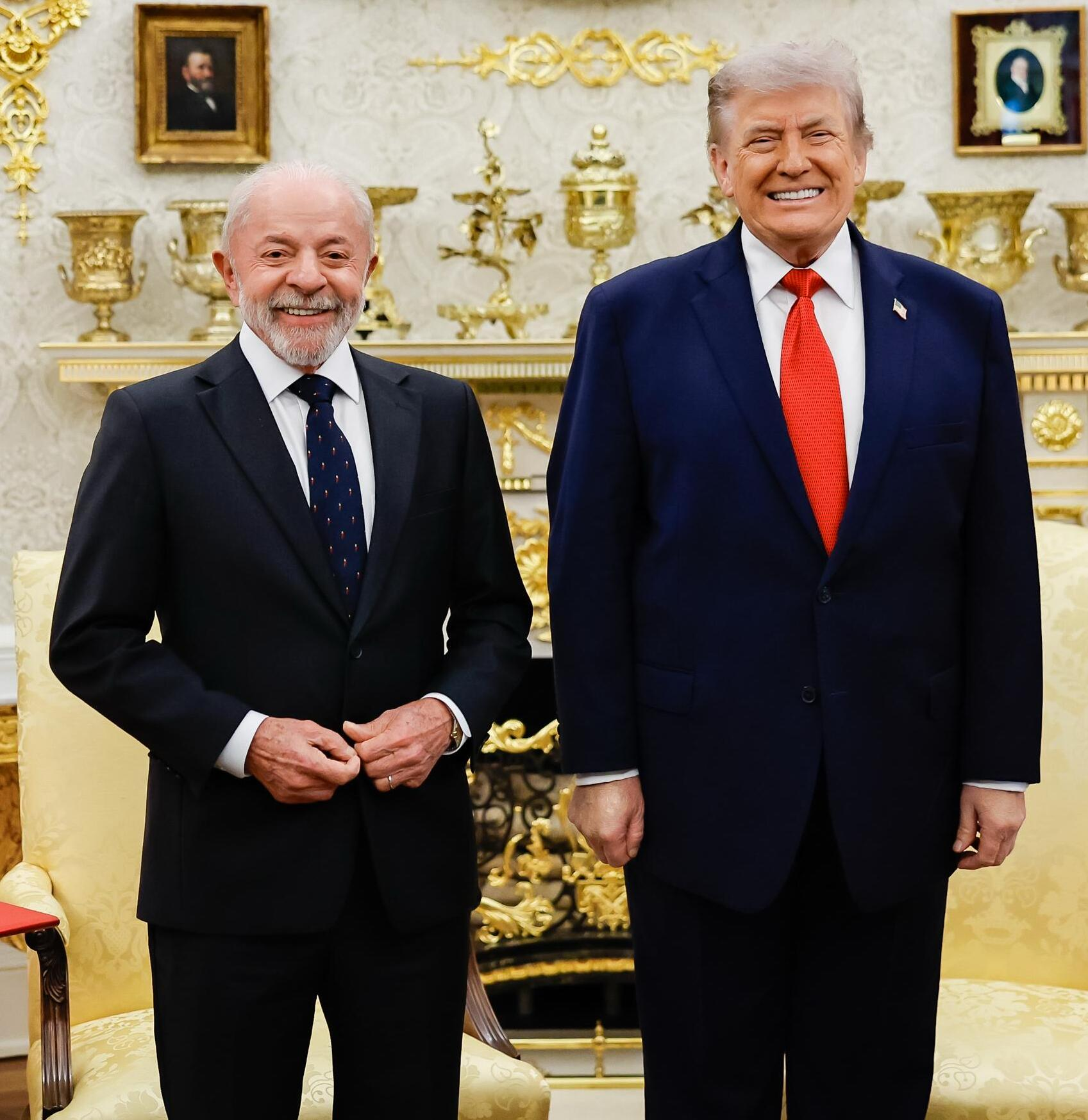
Brazilian President Luiz Inácio Lula da Silva (left) meets with U.S. President Donald Trump in May 2026.

The United States was, in 1824, the second country to recognize the independence of Brazil, after Argentina did so in 1823. Brazil was the only South American nation to send troops to fight in Europe alongside the Allies in World War II.

While Brazilian-American relations have been significantly strengthened since the 1990s, there has been a period of tension in relations over the June 2013 revelation of US mass surveillance programs in Brazil after there had been proof of American spying on Brazilian President Dilma Rousseff. She cancelled a scheduled visit to the US in September 2013 in protest over such revelations. Relations have improved markedly since Rousseff's official visit on June 30, 2015, to the United States, nearly two years later. From 2016 to 2019, under Obama (and then Donald Trump) and Michel Temer, relations were still fairly positive. In 2019 with the victory of Jair Bolsonaro, the two countries approached again, signing deals in the areas of trade, research, security and defense. When Joe Biden became U.S. President in 2021, relations cooled somewhat due to political disagreements between Bolsonaro and Biden, but when Lula returned to the presidency again in late 2022, relations between the U.S. and Brazil were stabilized once more, although Biden (and later Trump) and Lula have had their share of disagreements, including Lula's stance on the Russian invasion of Ukraine and the Gaza war.

The relationship between both countries represents the two most populated and powerful countries in the Americas (being the most dominant in South America and North America respectively); due to the political and economic weight of both countries worldwide, the two countries share membership in a variety of international organizations, including the United Nations, the World Trade Organization, the Organization of American States, the G8+5, and the Group of 20.

== Country comparison ==
	Federative Republic of Brazil	United States of America
Coat of Arms		
Flag	Brazil	United States
Population	213,421,037	342,586,000
Area	8,510,346 km^{2} (3,285,863 mi^{2})	9,820,630 km^{2} (3,791,770 mi^{2})
Population Density	25.1/km^{2} (65/sq mi)	34.8/km^{2} (90/sq mi)
Capital	Brasília	Washington, D.C.
Largest City	São Paulo – 11,895,578 (21,518,955 Metro)	New York City – 8,600,710 (19,006,798 Metro)
Government	Federal presidential constitutional republic	Federal presidential constitutional republic
First Leader	Pedro I	George Washington
Current Leaders	Luiz Inácio Lula da Silva	Donald Trump
Official languages	Portuguese	English (de facto, none at federal level)
GDP (nominal)	US$ 2.26 trillion ($10,585 per capita)	US $31.44 trillion ($91,822 per capita)

== History ==
=== Early history ===
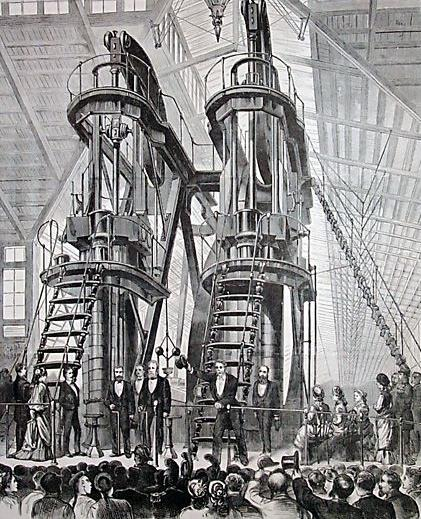
U.S. President Ulysses S. Grant and Emperor Pedro II of Brazil during the opening ceremonies of the Centennial Exposition in Philadelphia, 1876.

Before 1900, Brazil and the United States had minimal interactions and connections. Nevertheless, some notable exchanges and events did occur between the two nations. In 1822, the United States was one of the first nations to acknowledge Brazil's independence from Portugal, and this led to the establishment of diplomatic relations between the two countries. In the mid-1800s, Brazil and the United States began to expand their trade and commerce, with Brazilian coffee exports becoming an essential commodity for American markets. Furthermore, American investors and merchants started to establish themselves in Brazil. In 1864, Brazil and the United States collaborated in a military expedition against Paraguay, which culminated in the defeat of Paraguay in 1870, strengthening the ties between the two countries. Another significant event was the overthrow of the Brazilian monarchy and the establishment of a republic in 1889, which Washington quickly recognized. This was followed by the further consolidation of ties. Although Brazil and the United States had limited interactions before 1900, these events laid the groundwork for future cooperation and engagement between the two nations.

Following the transfer of the Portuguese royal court to Rio de Janeiro and the subsequent opening of the ports to foreign ships, the United States was, in 1815, the first country to establish a consulate in Brazil, more precisely in Recife, Pernambuco. The United States was also the second country to recognize Brazil's 1822 declaration of independence from Portugal in 1824, one year after Argentina recognized Brazil's independence. Recognizing the independence of countries of the Americas from their European metropolises was a policy of the United States, which hoped to undermine European influence in the region.

Relations between the two countries were damaged in 1864, during the American Civil War, when a Union warship attacked and captured a Confederate warship in the Brazilian port of Bahia Harbor. This event, called the Bahia incident, led the Brazilian government to claim that the Union Navy had acted illegally and violated Brazil's neutrality.

During the 19th century and the first half of the 20th century, interaction between the two was limited to multilateral fora, such as the Conference of American States. At the first Pan-American Conference in 1890, many countries of the Americas, the U.S. and Brazil included, discussed a series of regional integration projects. Those ranged from military to economic integration. The United States planned to create a Pan-American, anti-European economic bloc, a customs union. It meant to suspend external tariffs applied to inter-American trade but not to European-American trade.

In 1922, at the request of the Brazilian government, the United States established a naval mission in Brazil to advise and improve the Brazilian Navy. The initial staff of 16 officers and 19 petty officers counseled the Brazilians on such topics as gunnery, naval aviation, destroyer operations, and supply and medicine. The agreement lapsed during the Revolution of 1930, but was reestablished in 1932.

The Revolution of 1930 overthrew the oligarchic coffee plantation owners and brought to power urban middle class and business interests that promoted industrialization and modernization. Aggressive promotion of new industry turned around the economy by 1933, and encouraged American investors. Brazil's leaders in the 1920s and 1930s decided that Argentina's implicit foreign policy goal was to isolate Portuguese-speaking Brazil from Spanish-speaking neighbors, thus facilitating the expansion of Argentine economic and political influence in South America. Even worse, was the fear that a more powerful Argentine Army would launch a surprise attack on the weaker Brazilian Army. To counter this threat, Brazil forged closer links with the United States. Meanwhile, Argentina moved in the opposite direction.

=== World War II ===
During World War II, Brazil was a staunch ally of the United States and sent its military to fight against Germany, even as German u-boats sank Brazilian shipping. The U.S. provided $100 million in Lend Lease money in return for use of airfields to ferry troops and supplies across the Atlantic, and naval bases to fight u-boats. In sharp contrast, Argentina was officially neutral and at times favored Germany.

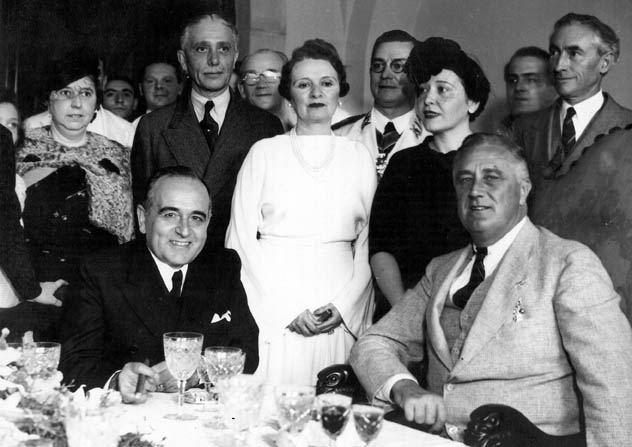
Presidents Getúlio Vargas (left) and Franklin D. Roosevelt (right) in Rio de Janeiro, 1936

American propaganda film Brazil at War (1943), praising Brazil as "a powerful new ally" and pointing out the similarities between both countries.

Brazil–U.S. interactions increased during World War II. In 1942, during the first Getúlio Vargas presidential mandate (1930–1945), Brazil made some contributions to the Allies—the United States, the Soviet Union, and the United Kingdom—against the Axis powers. This led to the creation of the Joint Brazil–U.S. Defense Commission, which was chaired by Major General James Garesche Ord and worked to strengthen military ties between the two countries, reducing the likelihood of Axis attacks on US shipping as soldiers traveled across the Atlantic to Africa and Europe, and minimizing the influence of the Axis in South America.

As a consequence Japan's blocking US access to rubber in Malaysia of the Brazil-United States Political-Military Agreement during the war, the "rubber soldiers"—about 55,000 people, mostly transferred from the drought-stricken Northeast of Brazil—were compulsorily drafted to harvest rubber in the Amazon, contributing to the second rubber boom in Brazil.

Brazil temporarily conceded the U.S. some space in Northeastern Brazil so the North American nation could launch its planes to fight the Axis in Europe and Africa (the Brazilian northeastern coastline is the easternmost point in the Americas). In 1944, Brazil also sent the Brazilian Expeditionary Force to be commanded by the U.S. army in Europe. Vargas was pleased by Franklin Roosevelt's promise that Brazil would be granted a permanent seat at the U.N. Security Council, a promise the U.S. was later unable to fulfill due to resistance from the Soviet Union and the U.K.

The presidency of Eurico Gaspar Dutra (1946–51) opened a brief period of democratic rule after ousting of Getúlio Vargas. During the Dutras administration, Brazil's foreign policy was aligned closely with that of the United States. Dutra outlawed the Brazilian Communist Party (PCB) in 1947 and broke off relations with the Soviet Union. In contradiction to the economic nationalism of his predecessor, he opened the country for foreign, mostly U.S., investments. Getúlio Vargas's return to power in 1951—now in democratic fashion—however, signaled a cooling of relations and a return to economic nationalism. Vargas blamed the U.S. for his ouster in 1945 and appealed to Brazilian nationalism, a sentiment that was growing in many sectors, including the armed forces. In the new Vargas mandate, the old tensions with foreign capital returned in full force—specially after he tried to implement a bill that precluded 90% of the capital produced in the country from being sent to international banks. As a result of the many scandals in his second mandate—corruption scandals, tensions with the military etc.—Vargas killed himself in 1954. He left behind a suicide letter, the Carta testamento, in which he points to media denigration and pressure from foreign banks as the blame for his depression and death.

=== Cold War and military dictatorship in Brazil ===
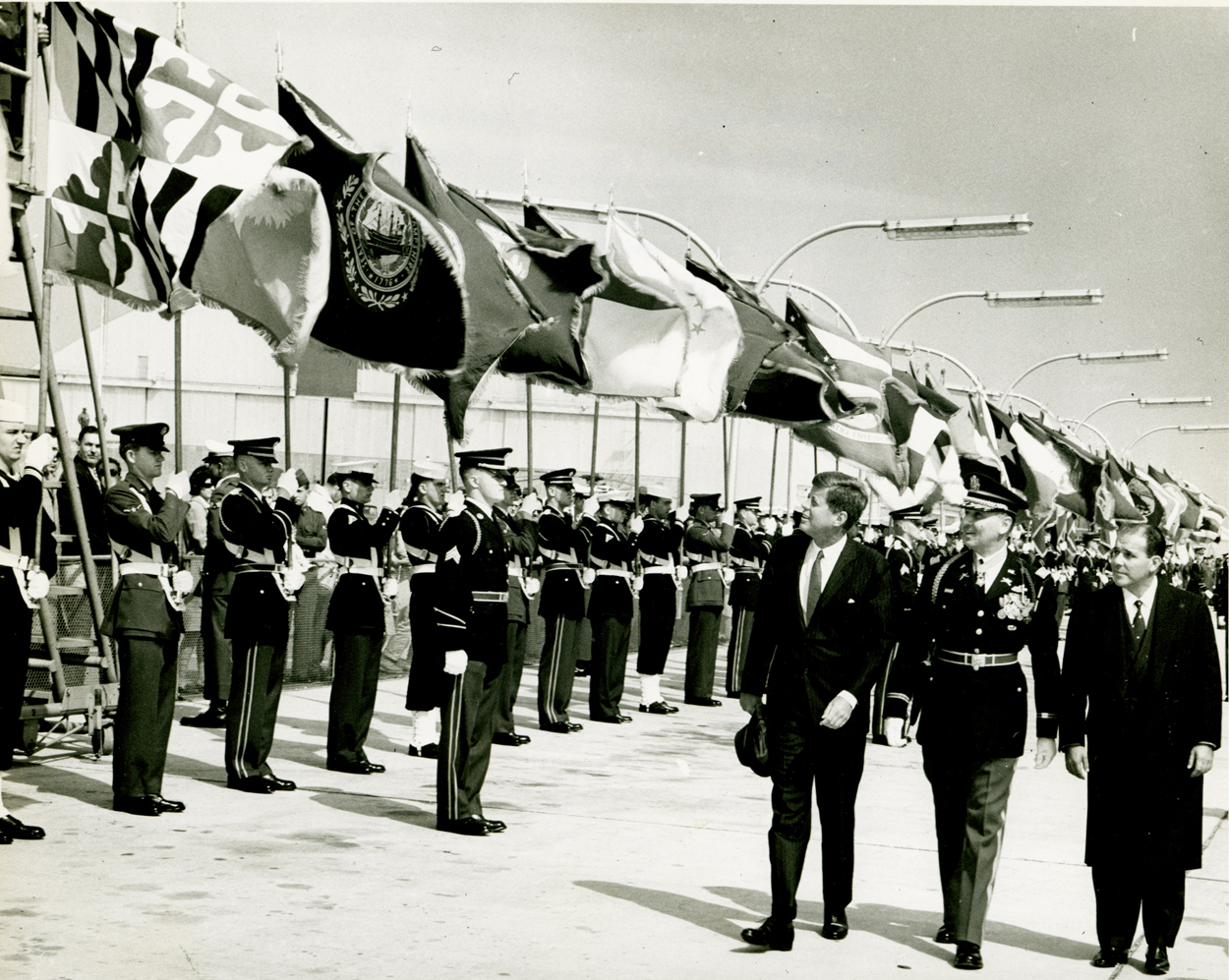
President John F. Kennedy (left) and President João Goulart during a review of troops on April 3, 1962.

In 1956 Juscelino Kubitschek took office (1956–1961). Like Vargas, Kubitschek had a pro-industries economic policy. He named it "national developmentalism." But unlike Vargas's plan (and in spite of the policy's own name), Kubitschek's was open to investments by foreign capital. Though he strengthened relations with Latin America and Europe, Kubitschek also sought to improve ties with the United States. His economic policy attracted huge direct investments by foreign capital, much of which came from the U.S. He also proposed an ambitious plan for United States development aid in Latin America, the Pan-American Operation. The outgoing administration of President Dwight Eisenhower found the plan of no interest, but the administration of President John F. Kennedy appropriated funds in 1961 for the Alliance for Progress.

Relations again cooled slightly after President Jânio Quadros took office. He ruled for only some months in 1961. Quadros was an out-and-out conservative, and his campaign had received support from UDN, Brazil's then-largest right-wing party which, five years later, would morph into ARENA, the military dictatorship party. But Quadros's foreign policy—named "Independent Foreign Policy"—quickly eroded his conservative support. In an attempt to forge new trade partnerships, the Brazilian president tried to create closer ties with some Communist countries. That included Cuba. Quadros openly supported Fidel Castro during the U.S.-led Bay of Pigs invasion. He visited the Caribbean nation after the event, and when Cuban revolutionary Ernesto "Che" Guevara retributed the visit, he was decorated with Brazil's highest honor. As a result of the political instability within the country—something provoked by his breakup with the UDN and tensions with the military—Quadros resigned. At that time, his vice-president, João Goulart, was on a diplomatic mission in Communist China.

In that year, Goulart took office (1961–1964). Political instability, however, continued high—for not only Goulart kept Quadros's unusual foreign policy (which the Brazilian press slammed as "Communist infiltrated"), but he also showed a clear leftist streak in domestic affairs. He had a pro-trade union stance and increased the minimum wage (which the fiscally austere Quadros had previously squeezed). By the end of 1963, the U.S. downgraded its relations with Brazil and reduced aid to the country. Washington's worries were that Brazil would turn into a nonaligned emerging power such as Egypt. But those worries dissipated on March 31, 1964. On that day a military coup overthrew the civil government. A U.S.-friendly military regime replaced it.

==== U.S. government support for the coup ====
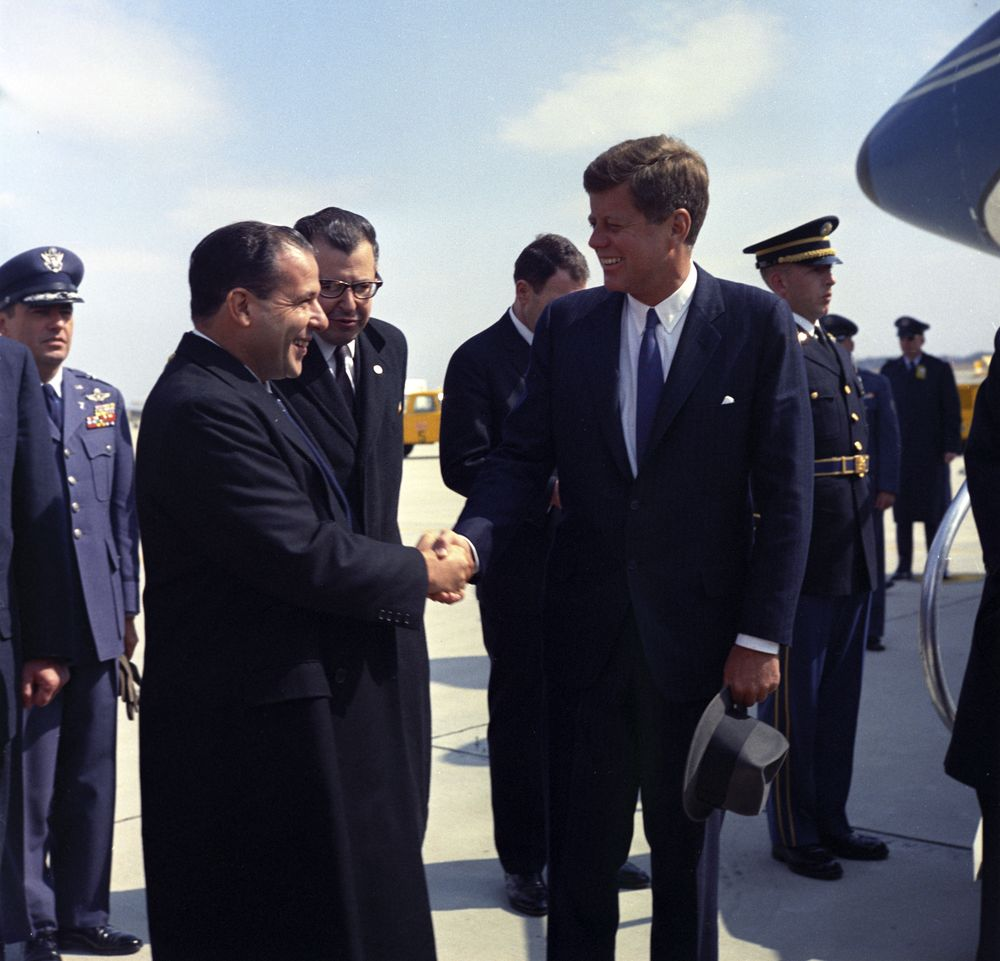
Kennedy greeting Goulart during his visit to the US, 1962.

Though never admitted by the U.S. government, the U.S. secretly provided arms and other support for the military coup plotters. U.S. government documents released on March 31, 2004, the 40th anniversary of the Brazilian coup, expose the U.S. role. An audio tape released that day, for instance, showed American President Lyndon B. Johnson (1963–1969) instructing his aides in Brazil with these words: "I think we ought to take every step that we can, be prepared to do everything that we need to do." Johnson's predecessor John F. Kennedy (1961-1963), who was killed in 1963, had discussed overthrowing Goulart's government in July 1962 two years before the coup. Officials in the Kennedy administration strategized on how to support a coup against Goulart or pressure him to remove leftists from his government and alter his foreign policy. U.S. ambassador to Brazil, Lincoln Gordon, a holdover from the Kennedy Administration, was perhaps the most enthusiastic pro-coup U.S. authority. Lincoln and chief Latin American advisor Richard N. Goodwin had a meeting with the President when preparations for the coup began in July 1962. US Attorney General Robert F. Kennedy, another Kennedy Administration holdover and brother to the late President, was also highly enthusiastic about the coup. An audio tape released on the 50th anniversary of the coup in 2014 revealed that Robert Kennedy had characterized Goulart as a "wily" politician" who "figures he's got us by the ass."

Four days prior to the coup, Gordon wrote Central Intelligence Agency agents in detailing how the U.S. should help the plotters: "If our influence is to be brought to bear to help avert a major disaster here—which might make Brazil the China of the 1960s—this is where both I and all my senior advisors believe our support should be placed." To assure the success of the coup, Gordon recommended "that measures be taken soonest to prepare for a clandestine delivery of arms of non-US origin, to be made available to Castello Branco supporters in Sao Paulo." In a subsequent cable, declassified February 2004, Gordon suggested that these weapons be "pre-positioned prior any outbreak of violence," to be used by paramilitary units and "friendly military against hostile military if necessary." To conceal the U.S. role, Gordon recommended the arms be delivered via "unmarked submarine to be off-loaded at night in isolated shore spots in state of Sao Paulo south of Santos."

In 2001, Gordon published a book—Brazil's second chance: en route toward the first world—on Brazilian history since the military coup. In it he denied his role in the affair. On Gordon's importance for the coup movement, however, James N. Green, an American Brazilianist, said in an interview with a Brazilian website: "[Gordon] changed Brazil's history, for he gave green light so the military advanced the coup in 1964. He made it clear that, if the coup was advanced, the United States was going to recognize it immediately, which was fundamental [to the plotters]." Media outlets, both in Brazil and the U.S., hailed the coup.

The U.S. immediately recognized the new interim government. At the day of the coup a United States naval task force was anchored close to the port of Vitória. The Johnson administration (and the International Monetary Fund) made large loans to the new Castelo Branco government (1964–67).

==== U.S. government relations with the military government ====
The new military president adopted a policy of almost total alignment with the United States. "What is good for the United States, is good for Brazil", asserted General Juracy Magalhães, the Minister of Foreign Relations of the Castelo Branco administration. In accordance with this thought, Castelo Branco took a series of pro-American policies in both the foreign and domestic agendas: in 1964 he cut ties with Cuba and China; in 1965 he sent troops to Santo Domingo in support for the United States occupation of the Dominican Republic; he opposed the creation, proposed by Chile, of a trade area in the Americas that would exclude the U.S.; and defended the creation of an Inter-American Peace Force, a Pan-American military force that would be made up of military contingents of all countries in the Americas. The force would be headed by the Organization of American States, and its main function would be to intervene in any nation of the region where there was danger of a leftist revolution.

In forming his economic team, Castelo Branco took to heart the advice that had been given to him by American officials. This, one sees in his indication for the Planning Ministry of Roberto Campos, a U.S.-educated monetarist economist. Together with the Minister of Finances Otávio Bulhões, Campos implemented reforms to both reduce inflation and make the Brazilian environment more open to foreign capital. Those included: public spending cuts, tax hikes on consumers and wage-freezing to lower inflation; massive privatizations; elimination of restriction on capital remittances to foreign banks; tax cuts to multinational profits; and the pulling out of subsidies and legislation that shielded national industries from foreign competition.

From 82% in 1963, annual inflation fell to 22.5% in 1967. In 1966, the budget deficit stood at 1.1% of GDP, from 3.2% in 1964. Therefore, if one takes into account the aims of such economic policies, then they can be thought of as effective. But they were unpopular with both the broader society and the nationalistic sectors of the military. The latter accused the economic team of being sellouts (entreguistas) bent on destroying national industries and delivering the country to U.S. Multinationals. Such accusations often appeared in the Brazilian press, which went mostly uncensored during the 1964–1967 period. The public attributed to the American government an immense political clout over the Brazilian regime, an impression encapsulated in a mock-campaign commenced by a humorist, Otto Lara Resende, whose motto was: "Enough with middlemen—Lincoln Gordon for president!" Gordon himself complained that American advisors were implicated in "almost every unpopular decision concerning taxes, salaries and prices."

The social consequences of such economic plan, the PAEG, were negative. Though inflation had been reduced, it was still high for international standards. And in combination with the wage-freezing policies, it caused Brazilians' real income to fall sharply—by about 25%—from 1963 to 1967. As a consequence, malnutrition and infant mortality rose. The Brazilian industrial elite, too, began to turn on the government; not only it had been hurt by the sudden market opening, but also the monetary tightening applied under the PAEG had dried out credit and induced a recession in output.

The overall failure of such reforms; the increased opposition faced by the Castelo Branco administration, even among sectors that had previously supported it; its closeness with the U.S. government; and its perceived leniency in combatting "subversive" leftists: all this led to the ascension, after Castelo Branco's death, of a different set of rulers, one that would alter Brazil's political and economic path and its relations with the U.S.

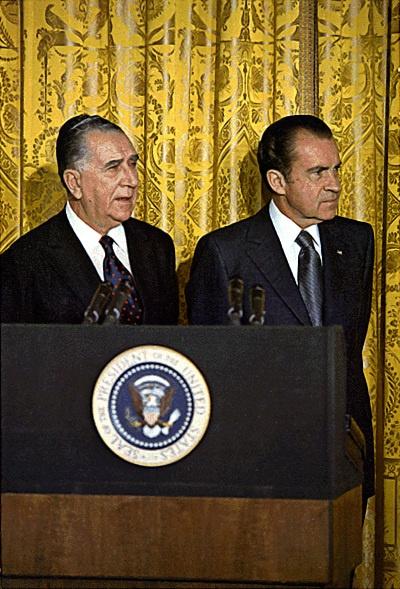
Presidents Emílio Médici and Richard Nixon at the White House, December 7, 1971.

After his death in 1967, Castelo Branco was succeeded by General Artur da Costa e Silva. Costa e Silva received support from Brazilian industrialists and from the nationalist wing of the military, a more numerous sector than the castellistas, the Castelo Branco supporters. It is rumored that, even before Costa e Silva took office, he demanded from U.S. ambassador Lincoln Gordon that he leave Brazil before the general assumed the presidency. This was provoked by an alleged attempt by Gordon to persuade Costa e Silva not to alter Castelo Branco's economic policies and re-establish the statist, developmentalist policies previously imposed by civilian former presidents. Gordon was replaced by Ambassador John W. Tuthill. With a green light from the U.S. State Department, Tuthill put into practice Operation Topsy, a procedure intended to reduce the American personnel employed in the U.S. Embassy in Brasília. As he explained in an article published in a 1972 edition of the Foreign Policy magazine, the "omnipresen[ce]" of the American embassy employee in the Brazilian political scene had become a cause of irritation among the increasingly anti-American populace and the Brazilian military, which had indicated, since Costa e Silva replaced Castelo Branco, that the country would follow its own strategy in political and economic matters.

On October 12, 1968, Charles Rodney Chandler, a US Army officer and veteran of the Vietnam War, was assassinated by members of the Vanguarda Popular Revolucionária (VPR) and the Ação Libertadora Nacional (ALN) in São Paulo, Brazil. On September 4, 1969, the National Liberation Action (ALN) and the October 8th Revolutionary Movement (MR8) abducted the US ambassador to Brazil, Charles Burke Elbrick, in protest of the US-backed military dictatorship. Elbrick was released after 78 hours, after an ALN-MR8 letter-manifesto was published and broadcast in Brazilian media and in exchange for the release of 15 political prisoners.

On the most part the Nixon administration (1969–73) remained positive to the Brazilian dictatorship. High growth during the Costa e Silva and Médici years excited Brazilian nationalistic hopes for a greater international role—hopes of which the U.S. was supportive, for Brazil was still considered to be one of the developing nations most sympathetic to the United States. There was, however, a cooling on both sides. On the U.S. side this was due to fears of being linked with its ally's abuses. It also distressed the U.S. the increased kidnapping risks that its ambassadors and diplomats faced in Brazilian territory during those years. The Médici tactics of suppression against leftist activists were provoked by the acts of urban socialist guerrillas that began to blossom after the 1964 coup. One of the favorite targets of such groups were U.S. diplomats.

As for the Brazilian side, the cooling had to do with many factors. One of them was the Vietnam War and the coming, but already clear, U.S. defeat, an event that would facilitate reducing co-operation with the North American nation. Other factors were:

- the intention to increase the country's profile by forging new partnerships and the insertion of new values in its foreign policy. The Brazilian government had hopes of playing a larger international role. That, the nationalists believed should be accomplished by becoming a leader among developing nations. To do that, Brazil had to loosen its ties with the capitalist superpower and the developed world in general. "Third Worldism" was a trademark of the Foreign Ministry rhetoric. A greater rapprochement with Africa and the Middle East was sought. At multilateral economic fora the Brazilian diplomacy, seeking to advance its economic interests as a developing country, acted in synergy with India and the broader Non-Aligned Movement in adopting a revisionist stance towards the rich nations. Non-interventionism was inserted as a key value in Brazil's foreign policy—not only as a means of pandering to other developing nations, but also to shield Brazil itself from criticism regarding its domestic politics. As a result, it began to oppose the re-creation of the Inter-American Peace Force (which had disbanded by 1967).
- The nuclear proliferation issue. Brazil refused to sign the Nuclear Non-Proliferation Treaty (NPT). It argued that the treaty was discriminatory for it unjustifiably divided the world into two different kinds of nations: first, the countries that could be trusted to use their weapons responsibly. These were exactly the same countries that by then had already established themselves as nuclear weapon states: the United States, the Soviet Union, the United Kingdom, France, and China. And second, there was the rest of the world, the countries that would have to give up the possibility of developing nuclear technology and enriching uranium on their own. The Brazilian government wound up rejecting the NPT as an infringement against sovereignty.

Despite this, while even most European nations, such as Great Britain and France refused to do so, Brazil was one of the few Western nations to vote alongside the United States against the People's Republic of China joining the United Nations, in support of U.S. ally the Republic of China in the UN General Assembly Resolution 2758 of 1971.

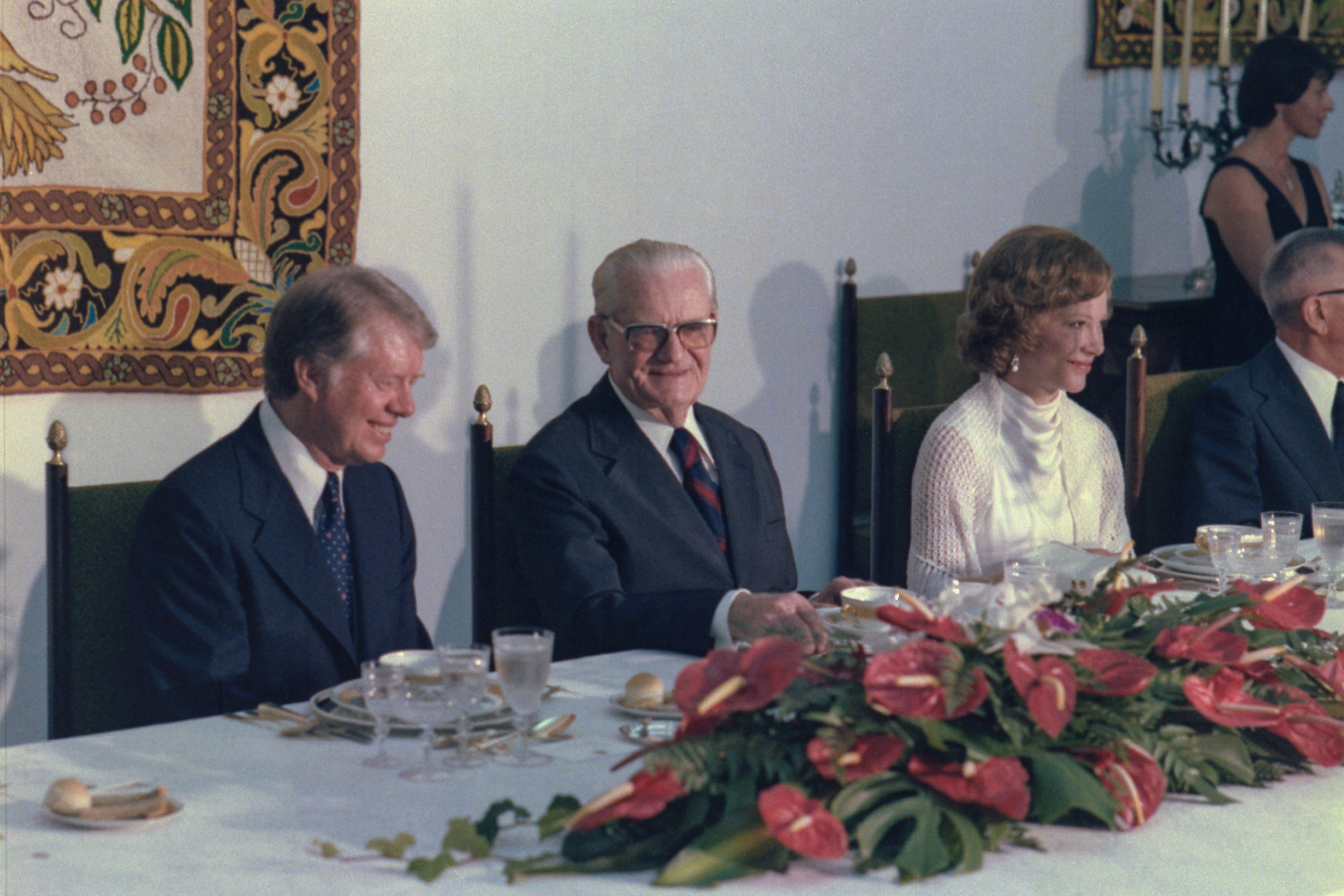
Ernesto Geisel (center) with Jimmy Carter and First Lady Rosalynn Carter at the Palácio da Alvorada, March 29, 1978.

The Geisel administration (1974–79) marked a definite cooling of Brazilian–American relations. As the United States began to apply high tariffs on Brazilian manufactured goods, Ernesto Geisel looked for new trade partners. These, he would seek mostly in other Third World nations (in Africa, for instance). But in contrast with Costa e Silva and Médici, Geisel commenced to reach out to Communist countries, too. In 1975, four years before the U.S., Brazil reestablished diplomatic ties with China. It promptly recognized the independence of fellow Portuguese-speaking Angola and Mozambique, two African countries whose independence from Portuguese rule had been brought about by socialist revolutions aided by Cuba and the Soviet Union. In 1975, Brazil voted in favor of Resolution 3379, a U.N. resolution sponsored by Muslim nations which equaled Zionism with racism. Only two other countries—Cuba and Mexico—had voted in favor of the bill. In supporting it at the expense of Israel, already then a major U.S. ally, Brazil's intention was to seek closer relations with oil-rich Arab nations. By then Brazil imported 80% of the oil it consumed. As such it had been greatly affected by the 1973 oil crisis, an event which had a tremendously negative impact on Brazil's current account and posed a major threat against its fast growth during the Médici years.

As the Carter administration replaced that of Gerald Ford, two other very sensitive issues—human rights and nuclear proliferation—came to the front in the relations between the U.S. government and Brazil.

In 1975 Brazil and West Germany established an agreement of co-operation in nuclear energy for peaceful purposes. The agreement was to transfer to Brazil the whole cycle of nuclear generation and a factory of nuclear reactors. The factory would enable the independent production of nuclear reactors as soon as 1978.

The United States opposed the agreement. In March 1977, Jimmy Carter took measures against both Brazil and Germany: he pressed two American banks, the Chase Manhattan Bank and the Eximbank, to suspend all financing activities negotiated with Brazil, and halted the supply of enriched uranium to Germany. He wanted to compel both countries to either renounce the agreement or to revise it so as to give space to the introduction of comprehensive safeguards similar to those established by the NPT. He also wanted the construction of the nuclear reactor factories to be canceled.

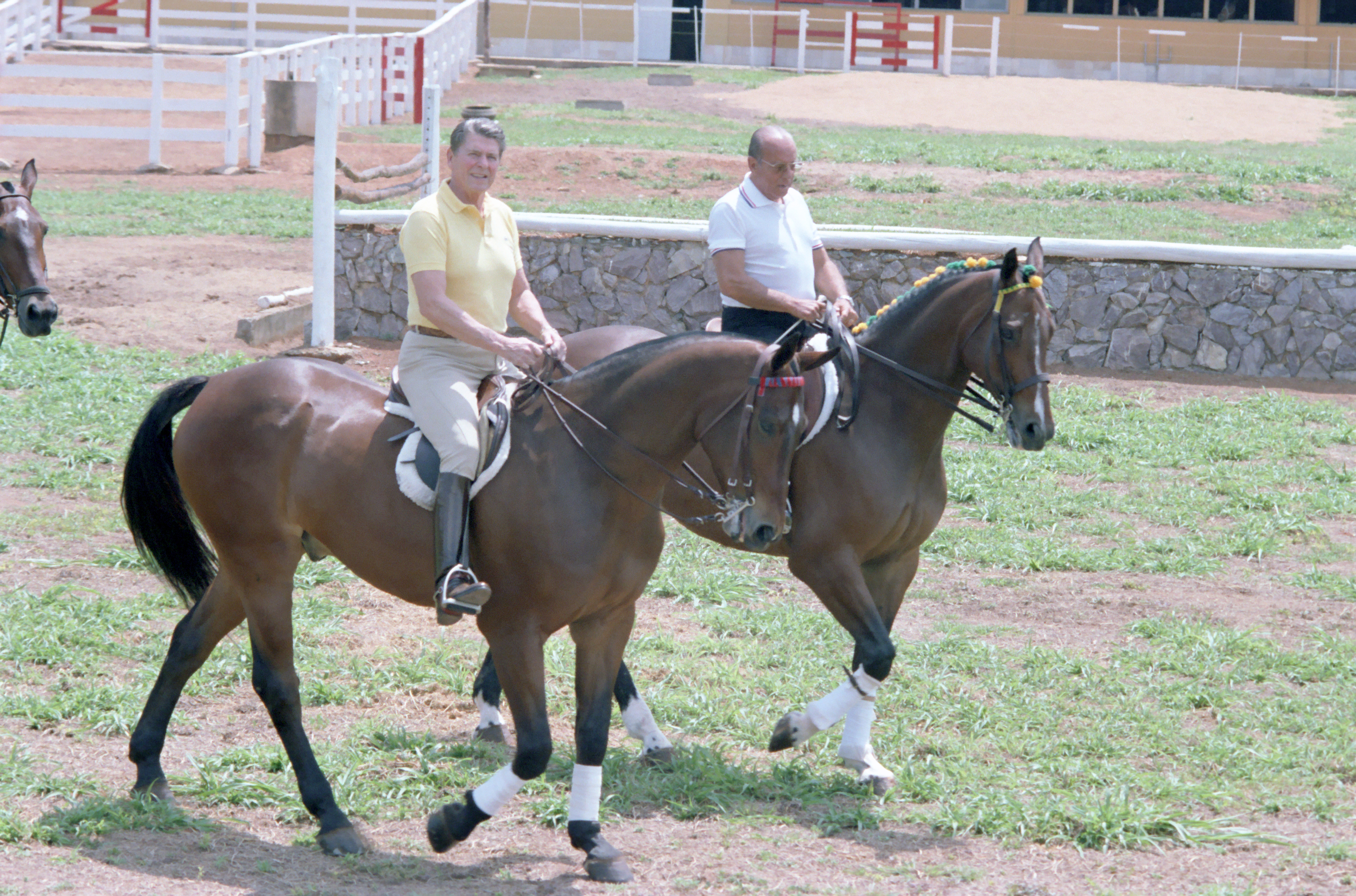
Presidents Ronald Reagan and João Figueiredo riding horses in Brasília, Brazil, December 1, 1982.

In the early 1980s, tension in the American–Brazilian relations centered on economic questions. Retaliation for unfair trade practices loomed on the horizon and threatened Brazilian exports of steel, orange juice, commuter aircraft, shoes and textiles. When President Sarney took office in 1985, political issues, such as Brazil's arms exports to Libya and Iran, again surfaced. Brazil's foreign debt moratorium and its refusal to sign the Non-Proliferation Treaty caused the United States to put Brazil on its mandated blacklist, thereby restricting Brazil's access to certain U.S. technologies.

==== End of Cold War; return to democracy in Brazil ====
On taking office in March 1990 President Collor sought a quick rapprochement with the United States in order to begin an aggressive policy of inserting Brazil into the world economy and placing it at the negotiating table of world powers. The Franco administration maintained an independent stance and reacted coolly to proposals by the Clinton administration for a South American free-trade zone.

=== 21st century ===
U.S. relations with the Cardoso government from 1995 to 2002 were good. Cardoso made a very successful trip to Washington and New York in 1995 and the Clinton administration was very enthusiastic regarding the passage of constitutional amendments that opened the Brazilian economy to increasing international participation.

The Bush administration came to view Brazil as a strong partner whose cooperation must be sought in order to solve regional and global problems. Issues of concern to both Brazil and the United States included counter-narcotics and terrorism, energy security, trade, environmental issues, human rights and HIV/AIDS.

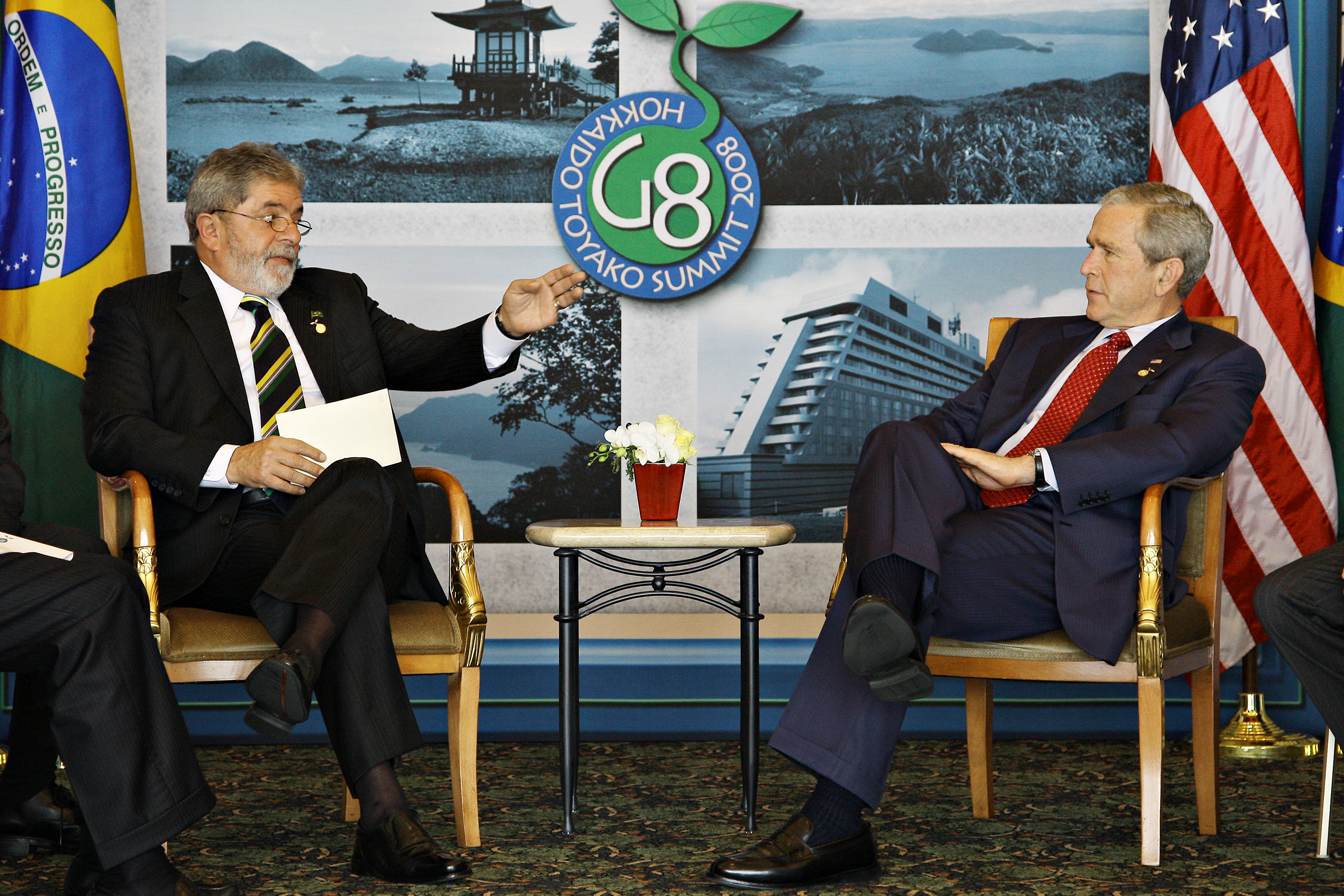
Presidents George W. Bush and Luiz Inácio Lula da Silva in 2008.

Following the September 11 attacks of 2001, Brazil was the first to propose invocation of the Inter-American Treaty of Reciprocal Assistance, also known as the Rio Treaty, which stipulates that "an armed attack on one member is to be considered an attack on all." The treaty was activated September 19 in a meeting of Western Hemisphere foreign ministers at the Organization of American States. On October 1, President Cardoso stated that the United States had not requested Brazilian military support and that Brazil does not intend to offer any. Despite Brazil's initial support for the United States, it did not opt to actively join the war on terror and under President Lula, it strongly opposed the Bush administration's Iraq War.

On June 20, 2003, President Lula made an official visit to the United States, and he and President Bush resolved "to create a closer and qualitatively stronger [bilateral] relationship." On November 6, 2005, President Bush visited Brasília and the two leaders reaffirmed the good relations between the countries and pledged to work together to advance peace, democracy, and a successful conclusion of the Doha round of global trade talks. President Bush thanked Brazil for exercising leadership in the world and in the hemisphere, including Brazil's role in the peacekeeping force in Haiti (MINUSTAH), and worldwide efforts to control HIV/AIDS.

After the death of Osama bin Laden in 2011, Brazilian Foreign Minister Antonio Patriota said that, "We're very worried that there will be reprisals. We hope that this event doesn't trigger an attack." but added that it was "important and positive" with the Arab world calling for increased freedom of expression. He continued, "Insofar as Al Qaeda and Osama bin Laden were and remain behind political strategies that prioritize acts of terrorism, [the Brazilian government] can only express our solidarity with the victims and with those who seek justice."

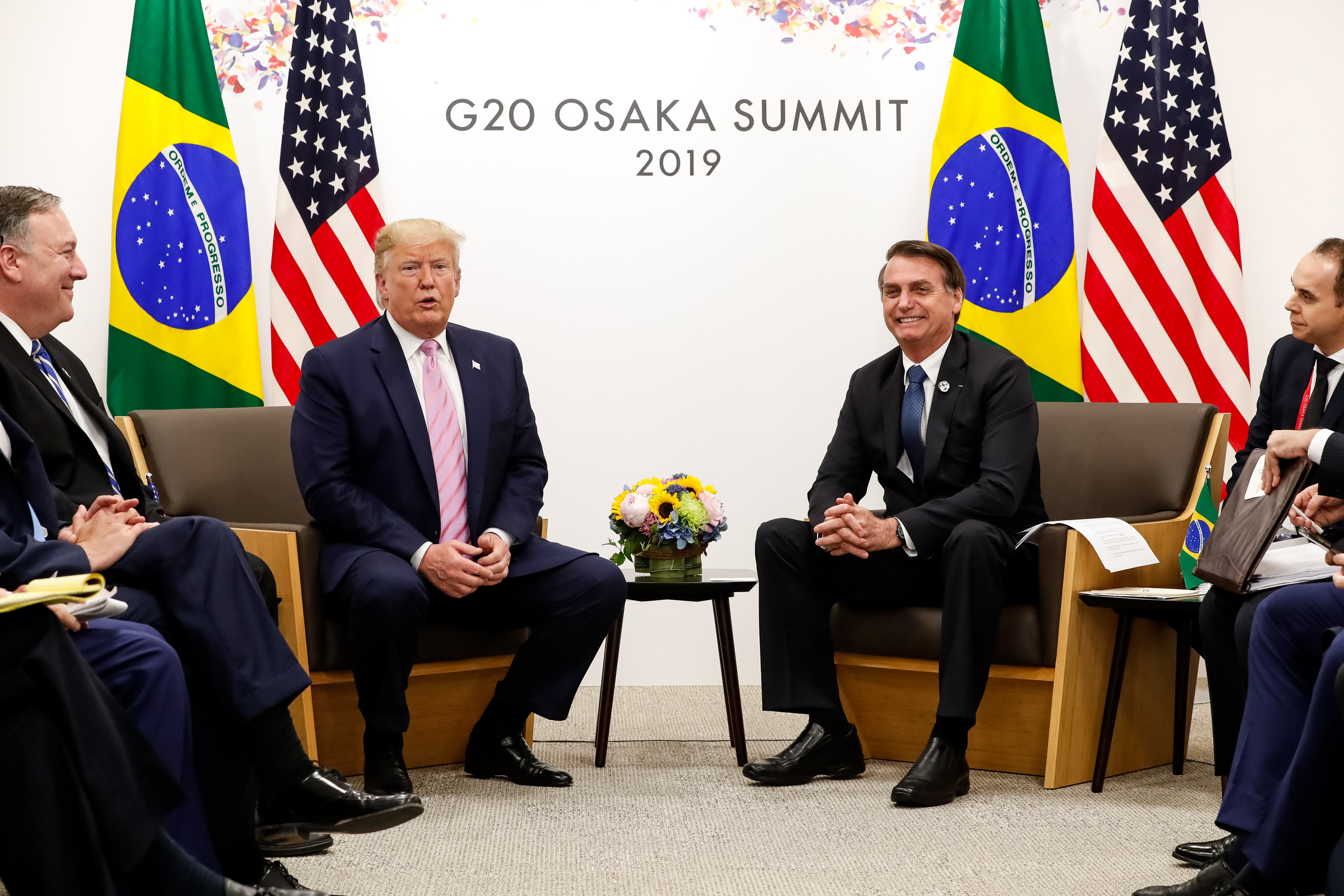
U.S. President Donald Trump (left) and Brazilian President Jair Bolsonaro (right) meet in Osaka, Japan in June 2019.

While Brazil has deepened its strategic ties with sworn U.S. rivals such as Iran, Cuba, Venezuela and Russia, and expressed recognition of Palestine as a non-member state (which the U.S. opposed), it has remained relatively centrist, adopting a neutral and non-interventionist stance in most international issues, such as abstaining on United Nations Security Council Resolution 1973 allowing for military intervention in war-torn Libya.

In March 2019, Brazil's president Jair Bolsonaro announced at the White House that American citizens, in addition to Japanese citizens, Canadian citizens, and Australian citizens, would no longer require a travel visa to visit the country for up to two 90-day periods per year, beginning in June 2019, in order to promote tourism. The United States did not reciprocate the policy.

In July 2019, U.S. President Donald Trump designated Brazil as a major non-NATO ally after receiving a working visit from Brazilian president Jair Bolsonaro. In October 2020, Bolsonaro said that the Brazil-U.S. relations have elevated to "its best moment ever".

In March 2021, it was revealed the U.S. attempted to convince Brazil not to purchase the Sputnik V COVID-19 vaccine, fearing "Russian influence" in South America. The 2020 Annual Report of the United States Department of Health and Human Services noted using the Office of Global Affairs to persuade Brazil to reject the COVID-19 vaccine. This did not stop a consortium of Brazilian governors in some states from signing a 37 million dose purchase agreement.

In April 2023, Brazil's president Luiz Inácio Lula da Silva said that the United States should stop "encouraging" the Russian invasion of Ukraine and "start talking about peace".

In early July 2025, President Trump threatened to impose a 50% tariff on Brazil because of the trial of Bolsonaro. On July 30, 2025, President Trump indeed imposed a 50% tariff of most Brazilian goods largely due to the trial against Bolsonaro which he called a "witch hunt." The tariffs are exempt from the aircraft, orange juice, and energy sectors of Brazil's economy. "The interference of the American government in Brazilian justice is unacceptable," said Lula de Silva in response. He said he does not fear getting on the wrong side of Trump with regards to the move. Trump's steep tariffs on Brazilian exports triggered a political "counter-reaction", pushing Brazil closer to China and other BRICS members. President Lula, once cautious about BRICS becoming anti-Western, shifted toward trade diversification and supported Dedollarization, stating, “Why should I be tied to the dollar, a currency I do not control? It’s the United States that prints dollars.” The move reportedly reinforced Brazil’s commitment to multi-alignment within the Global South. In a rare move against Trump's trade war, US senators passed a bill in late October 2025 that would remove Brazil's tariffs, with a vote of 52-48.

== Current issues ==
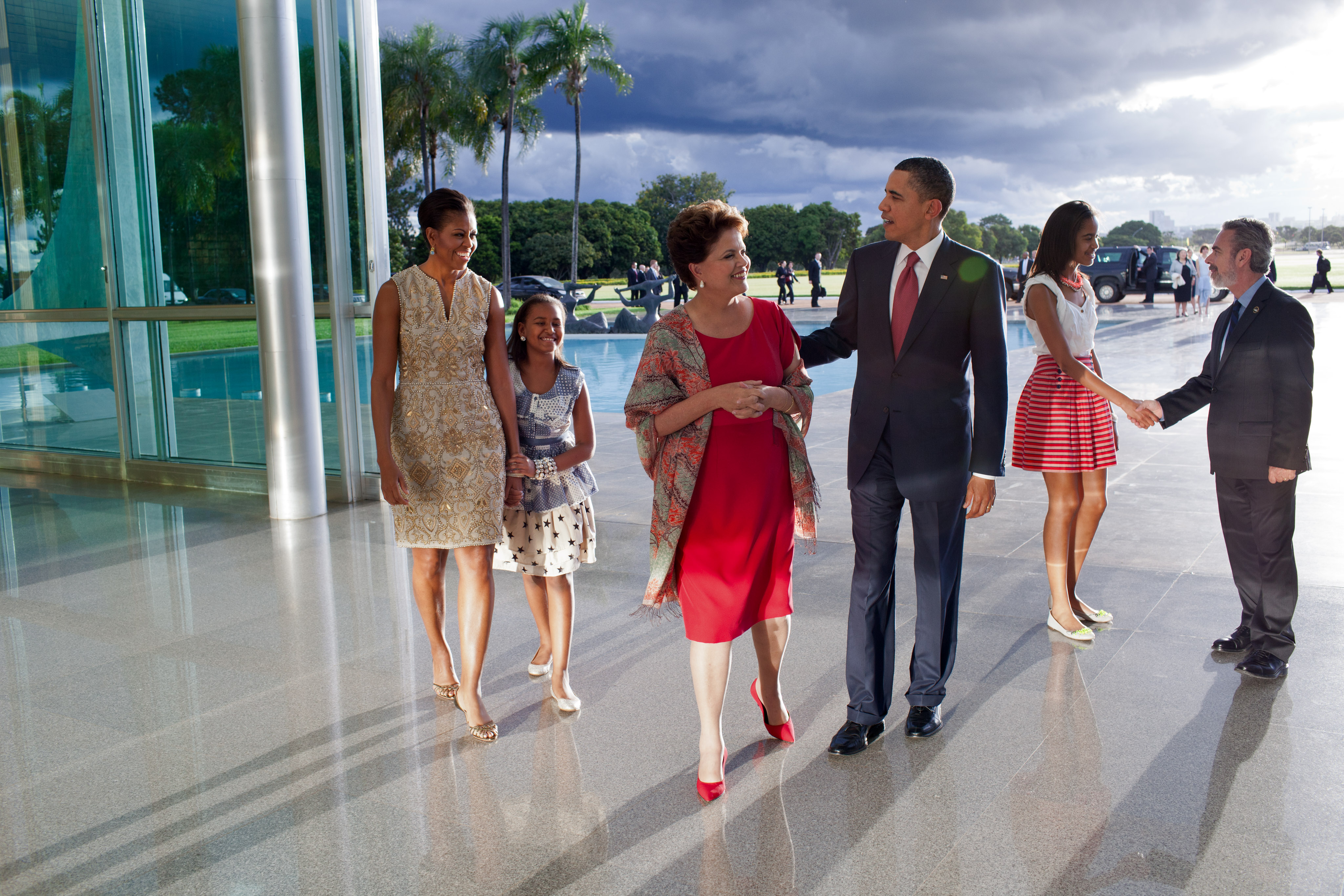
President Dilma Rousseff and Foreign Minister Antonio Patriota greet President Barack Obama and his family upon their arrival at the Palácio da Alvorada in Brasília, March 19, 2011.

During their first meeting in Washington on March 14, 2009, U.S. President Barack Obama and his Brazilian counterpart, President Luiz Inácio Lula da Silva, discussed the economy, energy, the environment, and the custody case of a U.S. boy taken to Brazil. "I have been a great admirer of Brazil and a great admirer of the progressive, forward-looking leadership that President Lula has shown throughout Latin America and throughout the world," Obama said after the meeting. "We have a very strong friendship between the two countries but we can always make it stronger", he added.

The issue of the abduction of children from the United States to Brazil has been raised by Obama, Secretary of State Hillary Clinton, the United States House of Representatives and other U.S. officials and major media. As of December 2009, there are 66 American children that have been taken by one of their parents to live in Brazil. While Brazil is obligated under the Hague Convention on the Civil Aspects of International Child Abduction to return every child to the U.S., it has not. Under the treaty, one parent cannot flee the legal jurisdiction where the child resides – "his habitual residence" – to shop for a more favorable court venue in another country to contest for custody.

Brazil voiced its discontent over the U.S. position of recognizing the results of the 2009 Honduran presidential election, as Brazil rejected the outcome of the election in Honduras.

As of 2012, Brazil and the United States disagreed over monetary policy, but continued to have a positive relationship.

According to the Financial Times special report on Brazil–United States relations, bilateral ties have been characterized as historically cordial, though episodes of frustration have occurred more recently. Brazil's former president, Lula da Silva, "prompted U.S. suspicion in 2010 when he tried to intervene alongside Turkey in the dispute over Iran's nuclear program." Along with Brazil's previous president, Dilma Rousseff, their "ruling Workers' Party has been a traditional friend of regimes considered unpalatable by the U.S., such as Cuba and Venezuela under the recently deceased Hugo Chavez." Throughout it all, however, trade has continued to grow, increasing from $28 billion in 2002 to almost $77 billion in 2012, with a $11.6 billion surplus in favor of the United States. Defense cooperation has also improved. The United States has maintained its order for Brazilian light attack aircraft, which represents Brazil's first such contract with the United States military. "Embraer, the Brazilian builder of the aircraft, has signed a cooperation agreement with Boeing to develop a jet-engined military transport aircraft. This has strengthened aspirations in Washington that the U.S. might eventually win a contract to supply the Brazilian air force with fighters." In March 2020, the U.S. government signed an agreement with the Brazilian government to develop defense projects. The companies involved will be able to utilize finance from the U.S. defense research fund.

=== Mass surveillance scandal ===
Brazil-U.S. relations soured in July 2013 when Glenn Greenwald wrote a series of articles in Brazil's O Globo newspaper revealing that Brazil was one of the largest targets of the U.S. National Security Agency's (NSA) mass surveillance program. The Brazilian government denounced the NSA activities and said it would consider bringing the issue to the United Nations.

On September 1, 2013, Brazil's Globo Network revealed the agency's spy program directly targeted the communications of President Rousseff and her top aides. The story was uncovered by Glenn Greenwald based on NSA documents leaked by Edward Snowden. The documents described how the NSA used its computer programs to gain access to e-mails, telephone calls and text messages of Rousseff and her aides. On September 2, 2013, Rousseff called an emergency meeting with her top cabinet members to discuss the revelations. The U.S. ambassador to Brasília, Thomas Shannon, was summoned to Brazil's foreign ministry to explain the U.S. spying. The Brazilian government called a press conference to denounce the act as an "unacceptable violation of sovereignty" and to announce it had requested an immediate explanation from the U.S. government.

On September 5, 2013, Brazil's government announced it had cancelled a trip to Washington by a team of aides who would prepare Rousseff's state visit to the U.S. in October. The cancellation was viewed as further sign that relations between the two countries were becoming increasingly frayed over the issue. President Rousseff met with President Obama at the sidelines of the G-20 summit in Saint Petersburg, Russia, to discuss the incident. In a press conference before departing to Brasília, Rousseff revealed the conversation she had with President Obama, stating she expressed her "personal indignation and that of my country regarding the alleged spying against the government, embassies, companies and Brazilian citizens by the National Security Agency of the United States." According to Rousseff, she told President Obama that Brazil would raise the issue at the United Nations and other international organizations, and would propose rules and procedures regarding internet governance in order to stop the mass surveillance programs.

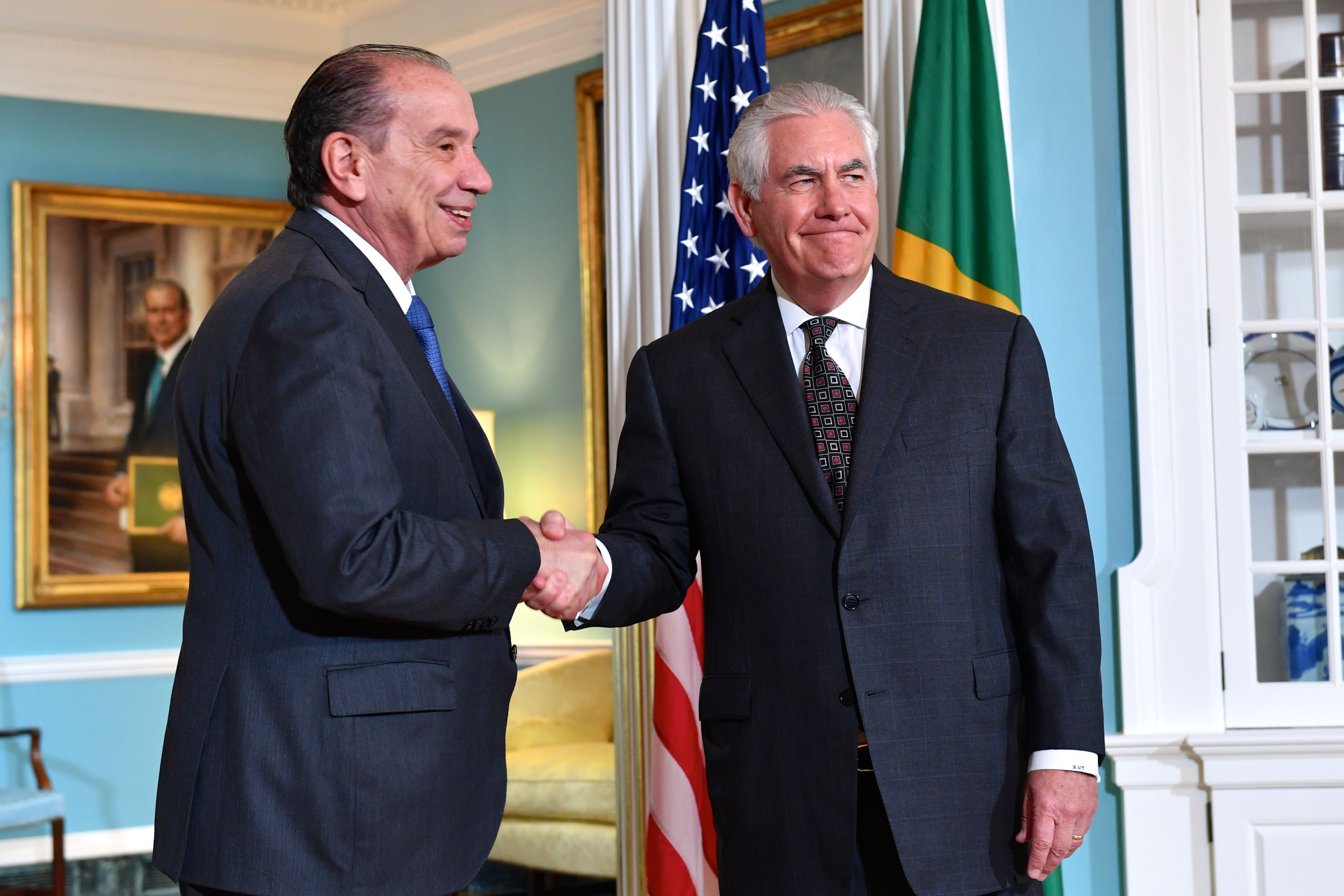
U.S. Secretary of State Rex Tillerson with Brazilian Foreign Minister Aloysio Nunes at the U.S. Department of State in Washington, D.C., on June 2, 2017.

On September 24, 2013, Rousseff gave an opening speech at the UN General Assembly condemning the United States' intelligence gathering methods in general but specifically of Brazilian citizens, corporations and government officials.

==== Reaction ====
Michael Shifter, president of the Inter-American Dialogue, considered the revelations "a major blow for the effort to increase trust between the two nations," and added that the "Brazil–U.S. relationship was under threat."

Addressing the opening session of the UN General Assembly in September 2014, Rousseff strongly criticized the U.S. strategy of forming an international coalition to counter with military strikes the advances of the Islamic State in Iraq and Syria (ISIS), urging negotiation rather than force. This stance, and Brazil's silence in face of the Russian invasion and annexation of Crimea may make less likely the chances that Brazil will achieve its long-standing desire to win a permanent seat on the U.N. Security Council.

In June 2015, President Barack Obama and Brazilian President Rousseff met nearly two years after Rousseff canceled a rare state visit to Washington following revelations that Brazil was a target of American spy programs. U.S. was looking for bilateral trade and investment since China has overtaken the U.S. as Brazil's largest trading partner. Rousseff traveled to New York to meet with investment bankers and to Silicon Valley to drum up business for Brazil's information technology industry. Relations between the U.S. and Brazil have since improved, and indeed the U.S. remains the leading investor in Brazil both in FDI and in number of M&A transactions

== Public opinion ==
According to a 2026 Pew Research Center survey, 47% of Brazilians had a favorable view of the United States, while 43% had a negative view.

== High-level visits ==
External videos
- The welcoming ceremony for President Obama in 2011.

Imperial and presidential visits from Brazil to United States

- Emperor Pedro II (1876)
- President Epitácio Pessoa (1919)
- President Júlio Prestes (1930)
- President Eurico Gaspar Dutra (1949)
- President Juscelino Kubitschek (1956)
- President João Goulart (1962)
- President Artur da Costa e Silva (1967)
- President Emílio Garrastazu Médici (1971)
- President João Figueiredo (1982)
- President José Sarney (1986, 1989)
- President Fernando Collor de Mello (1990, 1991)
- President Itamar Franco (1994)
- President Fernando Henrique Cardoso (1995, 1998, 1999, 2001)
- President Luiz Inácio Lula da Silva (2002, 2003, 2006, 2007, 2008, 2009, 2010, 2023)
- President Dilma Rousseff (2011, 2012, 2015)
- President Jair Bolsonaro (2019, 2020)

Presidential visits from United States to Brazil

- President Herbert Hoover (1928)
- President Franklin D. Roosevelt (1936, 1943)
- President Harry S. Truman (1947)
- President Dwight D. Eisenhower (1960)
- President Jimmy Carter (1978)
- President Ronald Reagan (1982)
- President George H. W. Bush (1990, 1992)
- President Bill Clinton (1997)
- President George W. Bush (2005, 2007)
- President Barack Obama (2011)
- President Joe Biden (2024)

== Resident diplomatic missions ==
Of Brazil

- Washington, D.C. (Embassy)
- Washington, D.C. (Consulate-General)
- Atlanta (Consulate-General)
- Boston (Consulate-General)
- Chicago (Consulate-General)
- Hartford (Consulate-General)
- Houston (Consulate-General)
- Los Angeles (Consulate-General)
- Miami (Consulate-General)
- New York (Consulate-General)
- Orlando (Consulate-General)
- San Francisco (Consulate-General)

Of the United States

- Brasília (Embassy)
- Porto Alegre (Consulate-General)
- Recife (Consulate-General)
- Rio de Janeiro (Consulate-General)
- São Paulo (Consulate-General)
- Belo Horizonte (Branch Office)

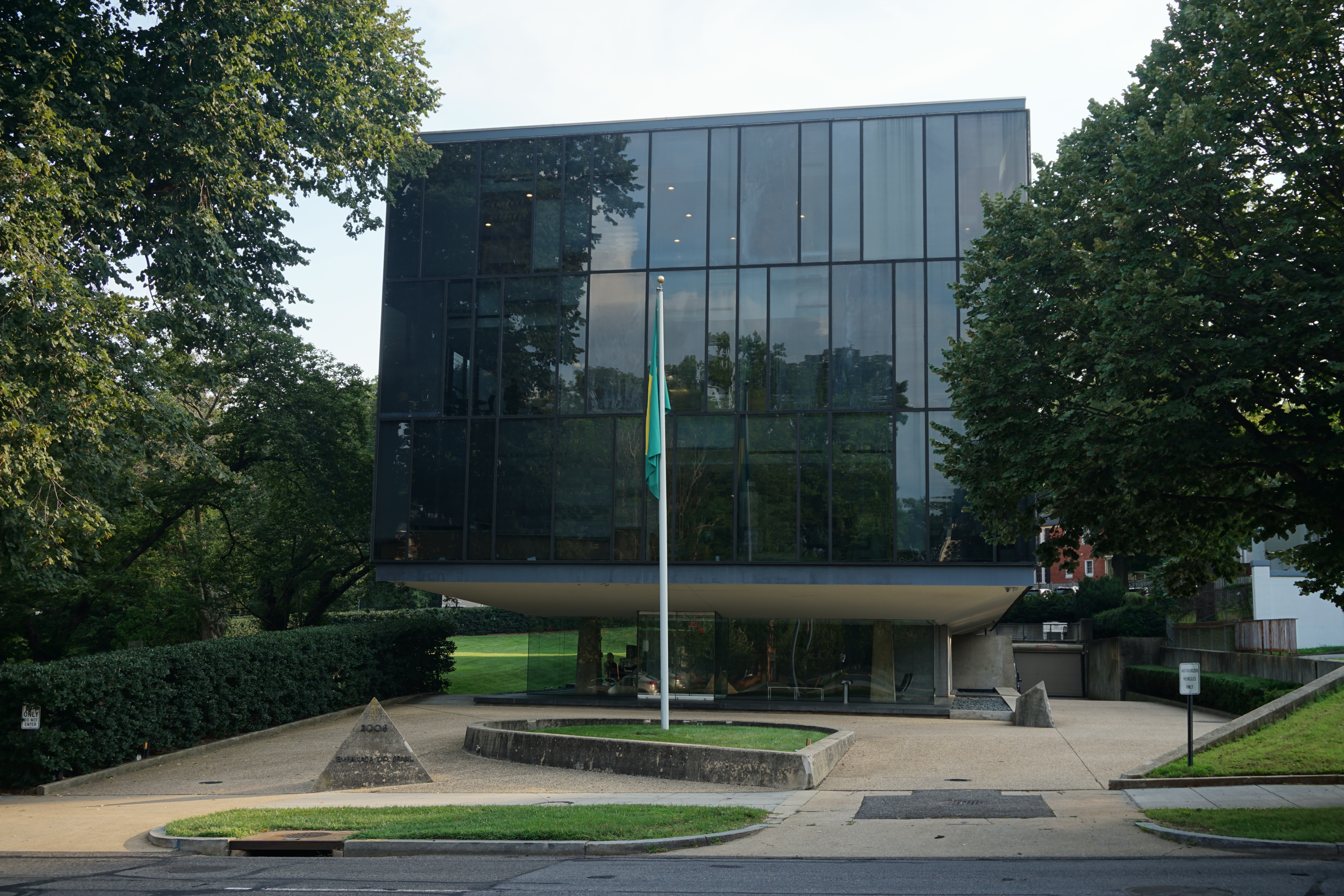
Embassy of Brazil in Washington, D.C.

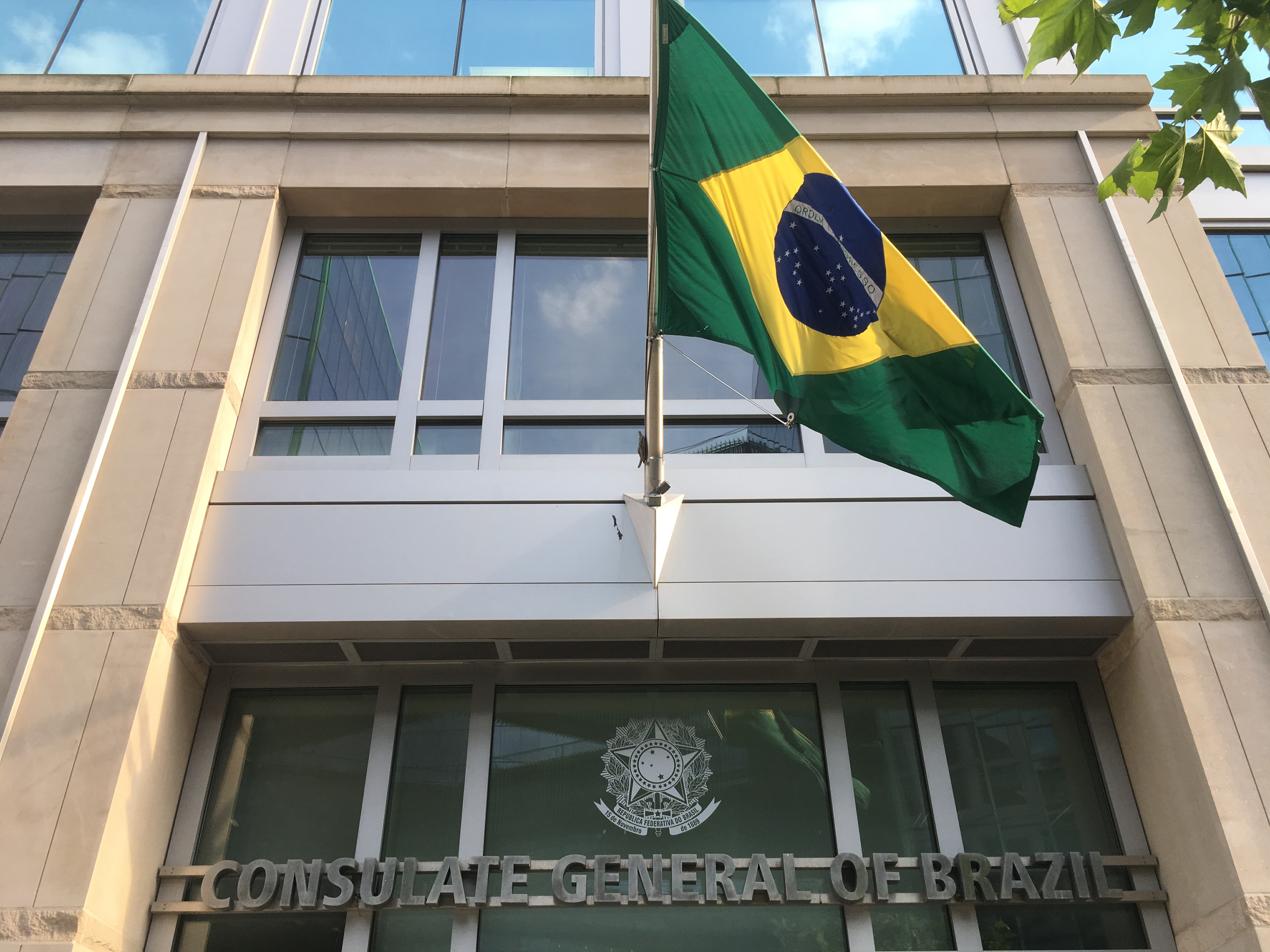
Consulate-General in Washington, D.C.

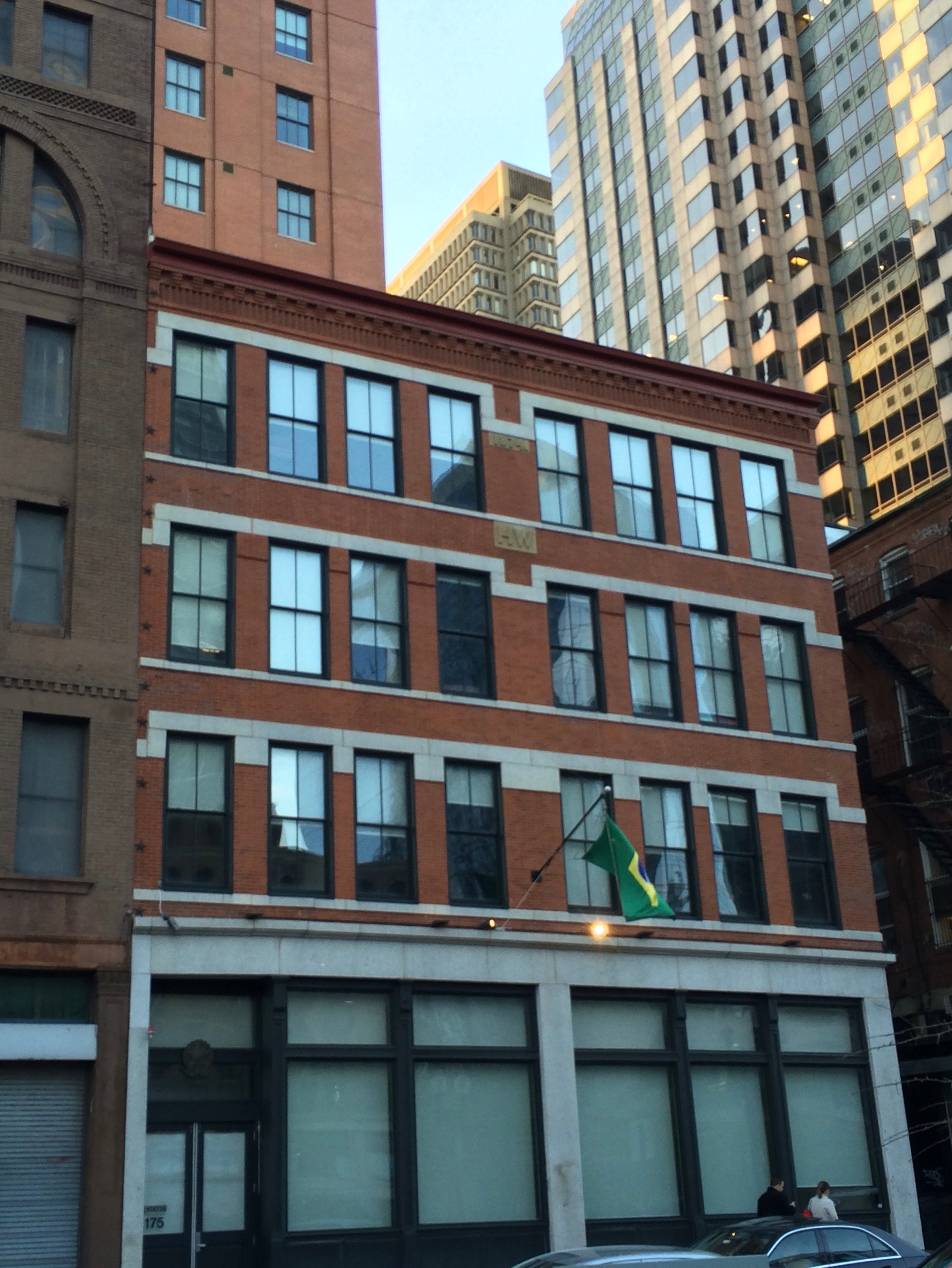
Consulate-General in Boston
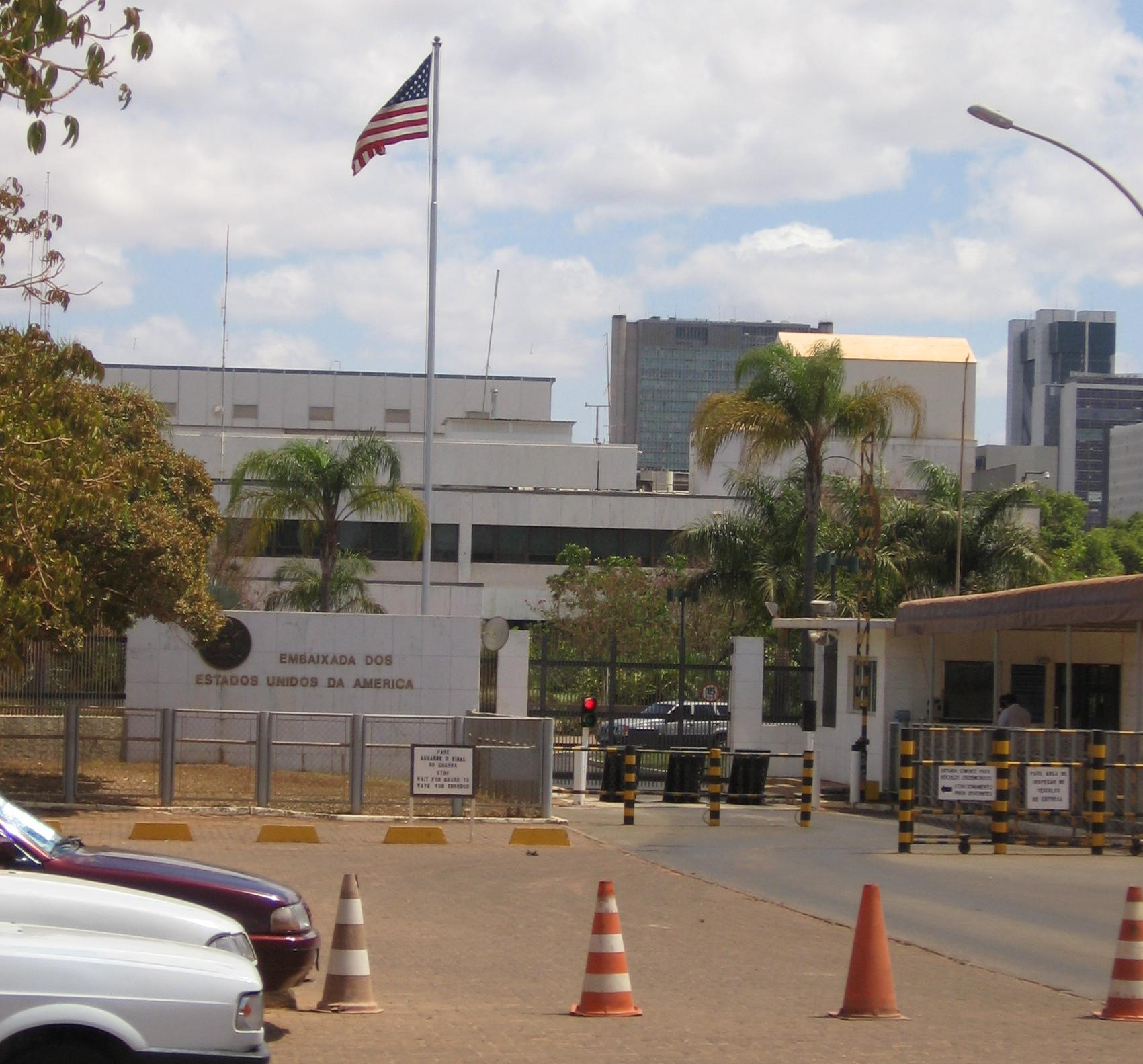
Embassy of the USA in Brasília

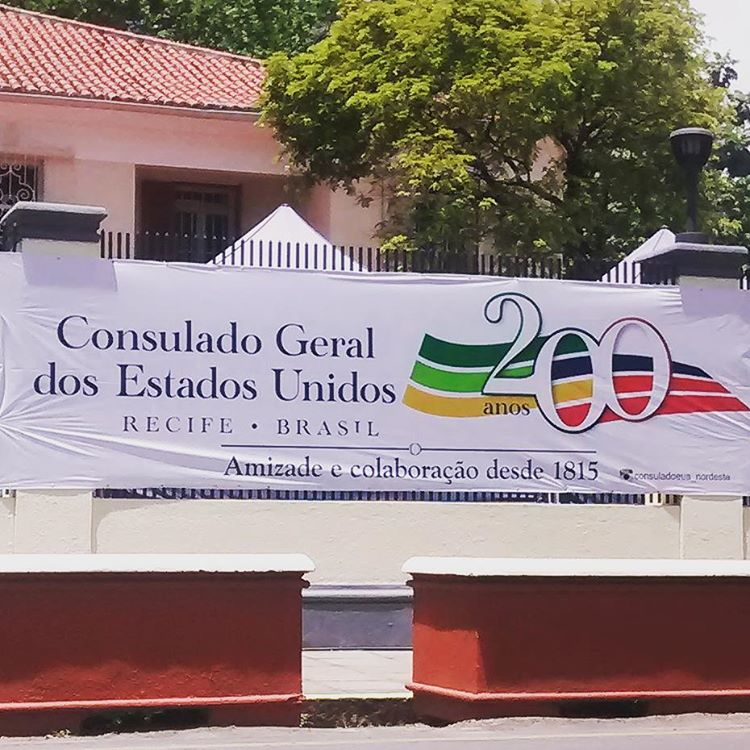
Consulate-General of the USA in Recife

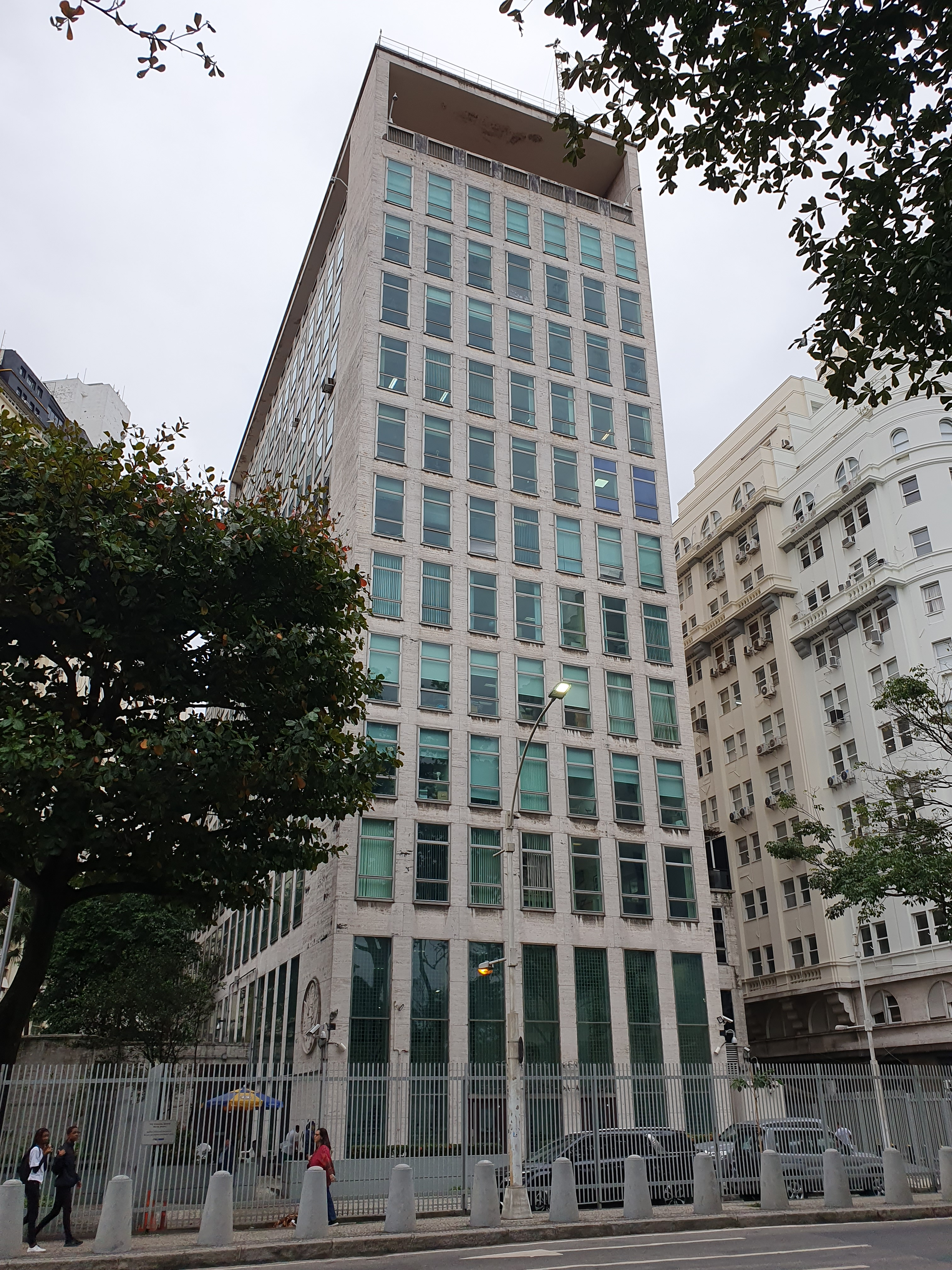
Consulate-General of the USA in Rio de Janeiro

== See also ==
- Brazilian Americans
- Foreign relations of Brazil
- Foreign relations of the United States
- List of ambassadors of the United States to Brazil
- Brazilian Ambassador to the United States
- United States involvement in regime change in Latin America
- Brazil-United States Treaty

== Notes ==
- Upon the deposition of the monarchy and the proclamation of the Republic, one of the civilian leaders of the movement, Ruy Barbosa, proposed a design for the nation's new flag strongly inspired by the Flag of the United States. It was flown from November 15, 1889, until November 19, 1889, when Marshal Deodoro da Fonseca (acting as provisional president of Brazil) vetoed the design, citing concerns that it looked too similar to the flag of another state.
