= Sérgio Amaral =

Brazilian attorney, diplomat, professor and politician (1944–2023)

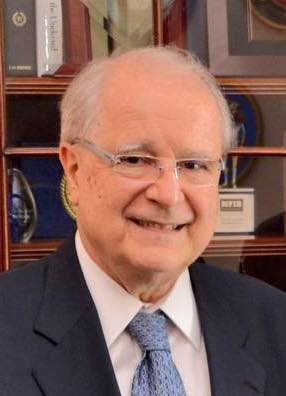
- Sérgio Amaral in 2018

Brazilian Ambassador to the United States
- In office 5 September 2016 – 3 June 2019
- President: Michel Temer
- Preceded by: Luiz Alberto Figueiredo
- Succeeded by: Nestor Forster

Minister of Development, Industry and Foreign Trade
- In office 1 August 2001 – 1 January 2003
- President: Fernando Henrique Cardoso
- Preceded by: Alcides Lopes Tápias
- Succeeded by: Luiz Fernando Furlan

Personal details
- Born: Sérgio Silva do Amaral; 1 June 1944 São Paulo, Brazil
- Died: 13 July 2023 (aged 79)
- Occupation: Attorney, politician

Sérgio Silva do Amaral (1 June 1944 – 13 July 2023) was a Brazilian attorney, diplomat, college professor, and politician.

Amaral was Minister of Development, Industry and Foreign Trade of Brazil, from 1 August 2001 to 1 January 2003, during President Fernando Henrique Cardoso government.

Amaral served as the Brazilian Ambassador to the United States between 2016 and 2019.

Amaral died on 13 July 2023, at the age of 79.

Political offices
Preceded by Alcides Lopes Tápias	Minister of Development, Industry and Foreign Trade; 2001−2003	Succeeded by Luiz Fernando Furlan
Diplomatic posts
Preceded by Luiz Alberto Figueiredo	Brazilian Ambassador to the United States; 2016−2019	Succeeded by Nestor Forster
