= Silvino Gurgel do Amaral =

Brazilian diplomat (1874–1961)

Sylvino Gurgel do Amaral (10 December 1874 – 13 January 1961) was a Brazilian diplomat.

== Biography ==
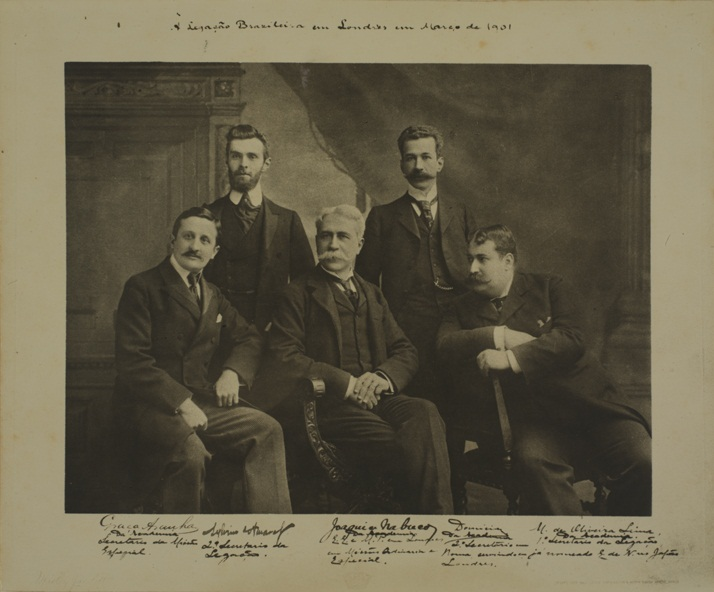
Amaral (first from left, standing) and other members of the Brazilian legation in London (1901)

He was the son of Eulália Ramos de Barros and José Avelino Gurgel do Amaral.

After a competition, Amaral was appointed second class secretary of the embassy in Saint Petersburg on January 2, 1896, where he served until November 5, 1896. By order of October 15, 1896, he was ordered to Madrid and accredited on January 23, 1897. He served there until December 31, 1897, and was then transferred to London on April 1, 1898. He then worked as a chargé d'affaires in Montevideo from April 3, 1898, to March 5, 1899. With instructions dated December 15, 1898, he was seconded back to London, where he served from May 26, 1903, to April 5, 1905.

In the period between 1901 and January 27, 1903, Amaral was deployed in Rio de Janeiro and a year later was promoted to first class secretary of legation in Buenos Aires. From April 28, 1905, to April 3, 1909, he was sent to Washington, D.C. transferred, where he worked as chargé d'affaires and was appointed legation councilor on February 21, 1907. Finally, he took over the office of chargé d'affaires in Madrid from May 4, 1911, to April 17, 1912.

By decree of May 25, 1911, he was appointed Minister Resident in Bogotá, but did not take up the office, but was ordered again to Rio de Janeiro from March 1, 1912, to March 27, 1913. He was then posted as envoy extraordinary and minister plenipotentiary, first in Asunción until March 14, 1915, then in The Hague until August 10, 1916, and then in Berlin until April 11, 1917. After Brazil declared war on the German Reich on April 11, Amaral was ordered to Bern from April 11 to 30, 1917, where he worked until August 29, 1922.

Finally, Amaral was sent as ambassador to Santiago, Chile, from 1922 to December 24, 1924, and to Washington D.C. from 1924 to 1930. By presidential decree of May 27, 1927, he was appointed special envoy to the celebrations of Peru's independence from May 27 to 30, 1927. From June 9, 1931, to August 11, 1934, he was Ambassador Extraordinary and Plenipotentiary in Tokyo.

== Publications ==
- Ensaio sobre a vida e obras de Hugo de Groot (Grotius) (1903)

Political offices
| Preceded by José Maria da Silva Paranhos | Chargé d'affaires of Brazil to Uruguay; April 3, 1898–March 5, 1899 | Succeeded by Carlos Lengruber Kropf |
| Preceded by Joaquim Nabuco | Chargé d'affaires of Brazil to the United States; June 15, 1806–November 15, 1806; June 1, 1907–October 2, 1907 | Succeeded by Joaquim Nabuco |
| Preceded by Pedro de Araújo Beltrão | Chargé d'affaires of Brazil to Spain; May 4, 1911–April 17, 1912 | Succeeded by João Fausto de Aguiar |
| Preceded by Luiz de Vilares Fragoso | Ambassador of Brazil to Paraguay; April 11, 1913–March 14, 1915 | Succeeded by Mário de Pimentel Brandão |
| Preceded by Armínio de Mello Franco | Ambassador of Brazil to the Netherlands; July 7, 1915–August 10, 1916 | Succeeded by Adalberto Guerra Duval |
| Preceded by Oscar de Teffé von Hoonholz | Ambassador of Brazil to Germany; August 14, 1916–April 11, 1917 | Succeeded by Adalberto Guerra-Durval |
| Preceded by Octavio Flaliho | Ambassador of Brazil to Peru; June 14, 1920–August 29, 1922 | Succeeded by Pedro de Moraes Barros |
| Preceded by Cardoso de Oliveira | Ambassador of Brazil to Chile; September 12, 1922–December 24, 1924 | Succeeded by Abelardo Rocas |
| Preceded by Augusto Cochrane de Alencar | Ambassador of Brazil to the United States; June 19, 1925–April 12, 1931 | Succeeded by Samuel de Souza Gracie |
| Preceded by Carlos Elias de Latorre Lisboa | Ambassador of Brazil to Japan; June 9, 1931–August 11, 1934 | Succeeded by Carlos Martins Pereira e Souza |
