= Ronaldo Mota Sardenberg =

Brazilian diplomat and politician

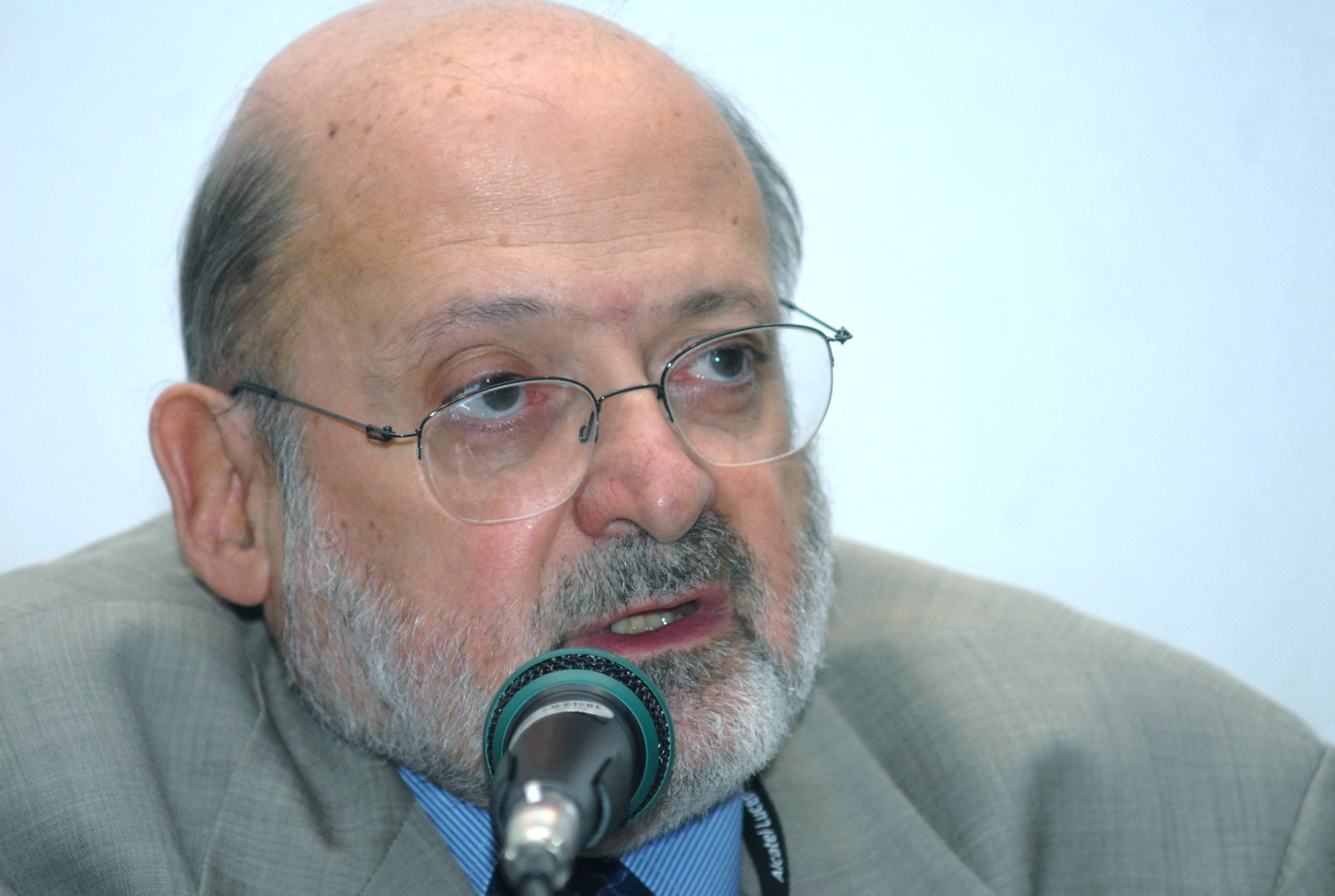

Permanent Representative of Brazil to the United Nations
- In office 2003–2007
- Succeeded by: Maria Luiza Ribeiro Viotti
- In office 1990–1994

Personal details
- Born: October 8, 1940 (age 86) Itu, Brazil

Ronaldo Mota Sardenberg (born on October 8, 1940 in Itu, Brazil) is a Brazilian diplomat and politician.

== Career ==
=== Foreign service ===
Sardenberg joined the Brazilian Foreign Service in 1964. He was the Chargé d'affaires of Brazil to the Soviet Union in 1982; and Ambassador in Moscow from 1985 to 1989. He served as the Brazilian Ambassador to Spain from 1989 to 1990.

He was the Permanent Representative of Brazil to the United Nations from 1990 to 1994; and from 2003 to 2007. He was also the Representative of Brazil at the United Nations Security Council from 1993 to 1994; and President of the UNSC in October 1993.

=== Governmental positions ===
He was the Minister of Science and Technology of Brazil from 1999 to 2002; and Minister for Special Projects in 1999. As Minister for Special Projects, he had been in charge of nuclear and space-related policies.

He also served as Secretary for Strategic Affairs of the Presidency of the Republic, from 1995 to 1998.

== See also ==
- Brazil and the United Nations
