= Nestor Forster =

Brazilian diplomat (born 1963)

Nestor Forster Jr.
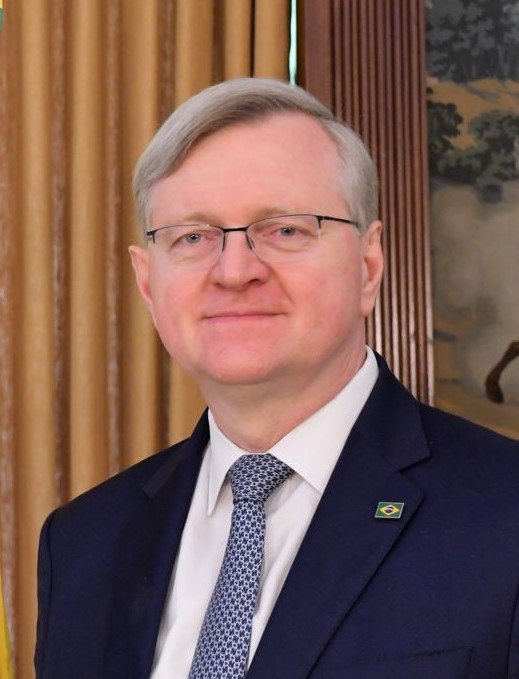

Brazilian Ambassador to the United States
- Incumbent
- Assumed office 23 December 2020 - 30 June 2023; Ad interim: 3 June 2019 – 23 December 2020
- President: Jair Bolsonaro; Luiz Inácio Lula da Silva
- Preceded by: Sérgio Amaral
- Succeeded by: Maria Luiza Ribeiro Viotti

Personal details
- Born: Nestor José Forster Júnior; 10 April 1963 (age 62); Porto Alegre, Rio Grande do Sul, Brazil
- Spouse: Maria Thereza Diniz Forster
- Occupation: Diplomat

Nestor José Forster Júnior (born 10 April 1963) is a Brazilian diplomat, who formerly served as Ambassador Extraordinary and Plenipotentiary of Brazil to the United States of America in Washington, D.C.

He was appointed by President Jair Bolsonaro as the Brazilian Ambassador to the United States in 2019. His nomination was approved by the Brazilian Senate in October 2020.

== Biography ==
Born in Porto Alegre, Brazil, in 1963, Forster graduated from the Brazilian Diplomatic Academy (Instituto Rio Branco) in 1986. As a diplomat, he served in Canada, Costa Rica, and the United States, where he was posted three times to the Embassy in Washington, as well as to the Brazilian consulates in Hartford (CT) and New York (NY). Forster was posted twice to the Office of the President of Brazil (1990–92 and 2002), having also served as chief of staff at the Office of the Attorney General.

Forster was the Chargé d'Affaires at the Brazilian Embassy in Washington, D.C. from June 2019 until his confirmation as the Ambassador of Brazil to the United States. He had his hearing before the Brazilian Senate Foreign Affairs Committee on 13 February 2020, where his indication was unanimously approved. He was later confirmed by the Brazilian Senate on 22 September 2020.

He is married to Maria Thereza Diniz Forster, also a diplomat, with whom he has two daughters and three grandchildren. Forster is a fan of Sport Club Internacional.

During his tenure as Ambassador in Washington, Brazil and the United States negotiated cooperation agreements in trade, space and defense matters. The two countries concluded a Protocol on Trade Rules and Transparency, which entered into force in 2022. In 2021, Brazil was the first Latin American country to sign an agreement to participate in NASA's Artemis Program. On defense cooperation, the Research, Development, Test, and Evaluations (RDT&E) Agreement, signed by Brazil and the United States in 2020, entered into force in 2022.

Diplomatic posts
Preceded by Sérgio Amaral	Brazilian Ambassador to the United States; 2020−present	Incumbent
