= Embassy of the United States, Brasília =

United States embassy in Brazil

Embassy of the United States in Brasília
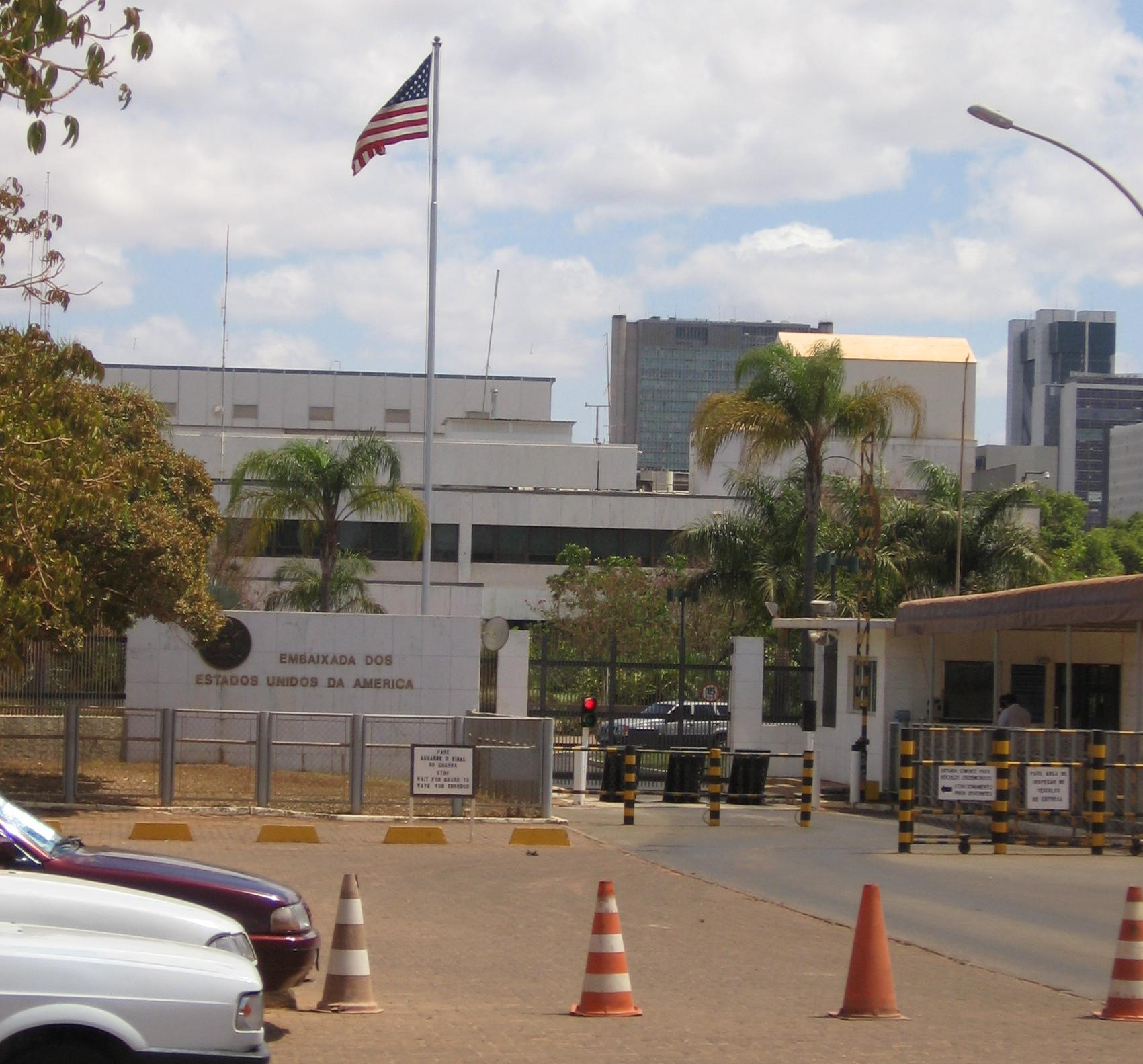
- Address: SES 801, Lot 03, Setor de Embaixadas Sul – Asa Sul, Brasília, DF 70403-900 Brazil
- Coordinates: 15.803581°S 47.872948°W
- Chargé d'affaires: Gabriel Escobar
- Website: https://br.usembassy.gov/

The Embassy of the United States, Brasília is the diplomatic mission of the United States in Brazil. The United States was the first nation to establish itself in Brasília in 1960, although the headquarters was only fully completed in the 1970s.

== Services ==
The embassy provides the customary services of foreign representations, such as assisting Americans living in Brazil and visitors from the United States including service passports, emergency, electoral and tax services. Interviews for U.S. entry and exit visas for Brazilians are also conducted there.

Other activities that go through the embassy include diplomatic relations with the Brazilian government in political, economic, and scientific areas and assistance to companies operating or wishing to operate in Brazil.

== History ==
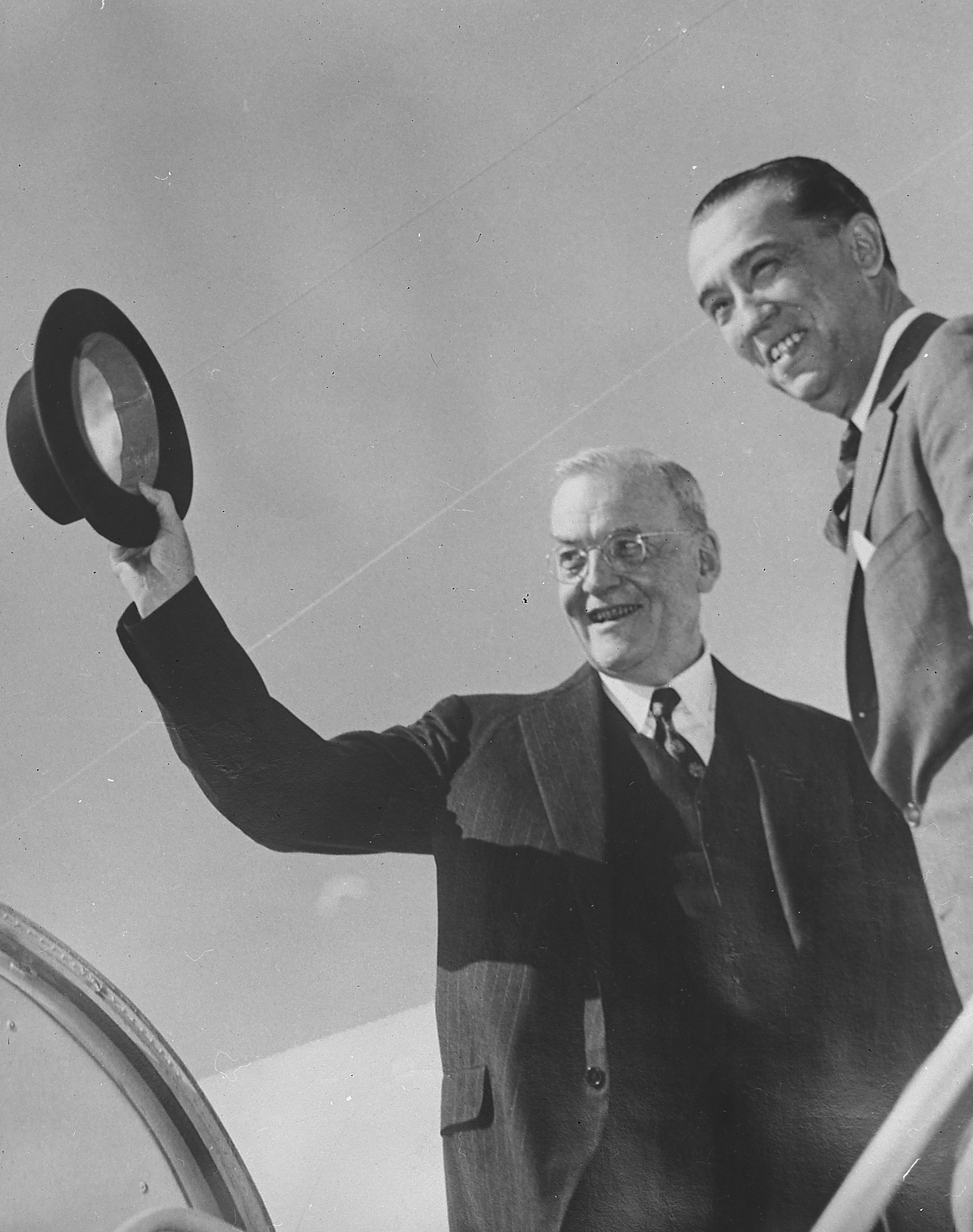
U.S. Secretary of State John Foster Dulles boarding for Brasília with Juscelino Kubitschek

The United States received a plot of land in Brasília in 1958, chosen by then U.S. Secretary of State John Foster Dulles, who was visiting the construction of the new capital in 1958 alongside the Brazilian President Juscelino Kubitschek. The U.S. considers itself the first country to confirm its embassy's move to the new Brazilian capital, although the transition was only completed in the 1970s.

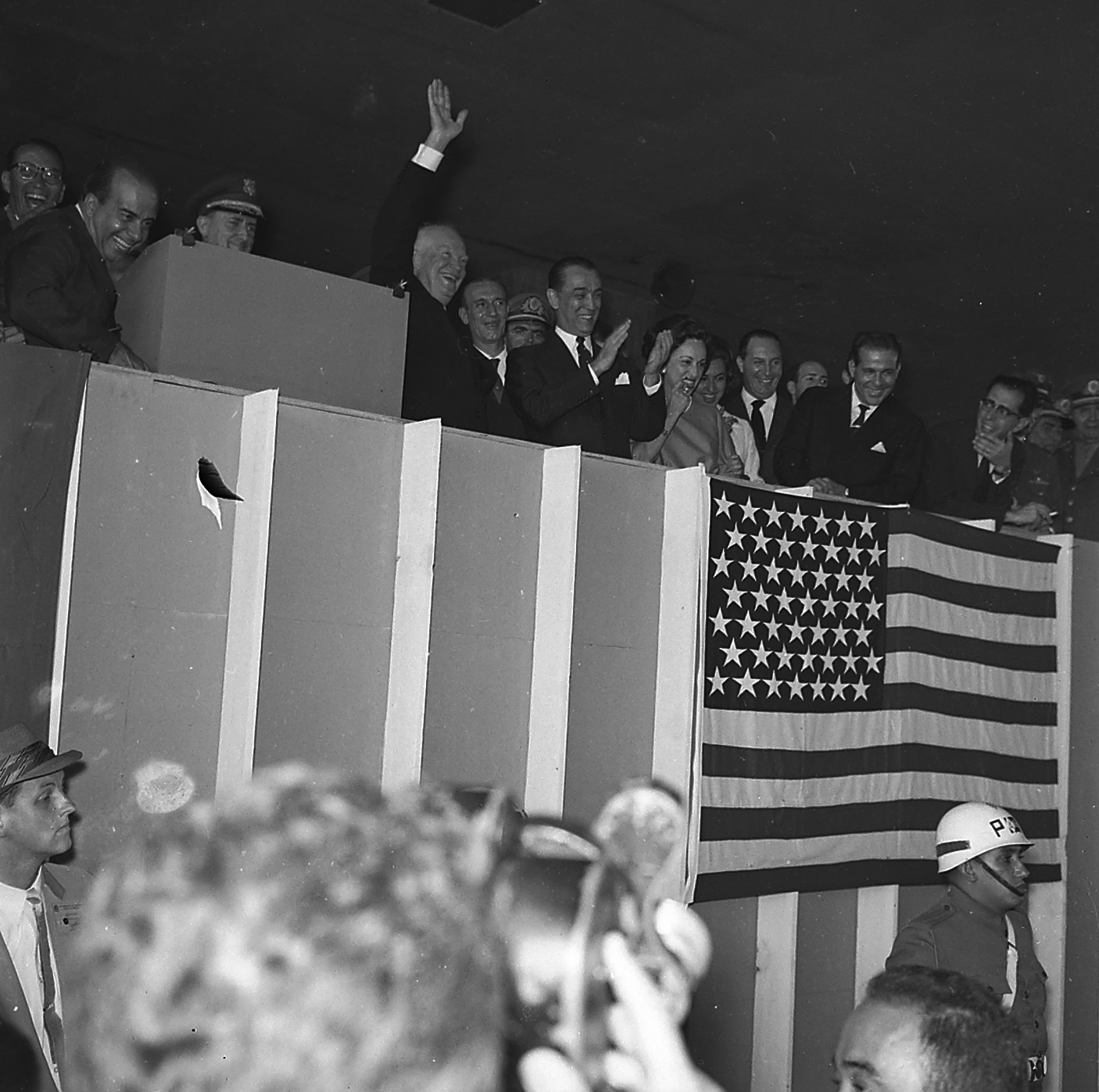
U.S. President Dwight D. Eisenhower laying the foundation stone of the Chancellery during his visit to Brasília in 1960

The plot was officially occupied by a trailer in 1960, and U.S. President Dwight D. Eisenhower laid the foundation stone of the Chancellery during his visit to the still-under-construction city on February 23, 1960, shortly before its inauguration. The U.S. Embassy began its operations in Brasília temporarily at the Brasília Palace Hotel, relocating to the Chancellery in March 1961. The chancellery, designed by McLeod and Ferrera, was not yet completed and was inaugurated only in April 1961.

The building was expanded in 1972, with a design by Henningson, Durham, and Richardson. It has two floors in a modern style, like most buildings in the city. The facade is of Vermont marble, and the landscaping of the internal courtyards and gardens is by Brazilian Roberto Burle Marx.

In March 2016, after an international competition, the U.S. State Department announced that the Embassy building is to be replaced by a new embassy designed by Studio Gang. The new buildings will be constructed sequentially on the same site.

== See also ==
- United States Ambassador to Brazil
- Diplomatic missions of the United States
- Brazil–United States relations
- List of ambassadors of the United States to Brazil
