= List of ambassadors of Brazil to the United States =

Ambassador of Brazil to the United States
- Embaixadora do Brasil nos Estados Unidos
- Coat of arms of Brazil

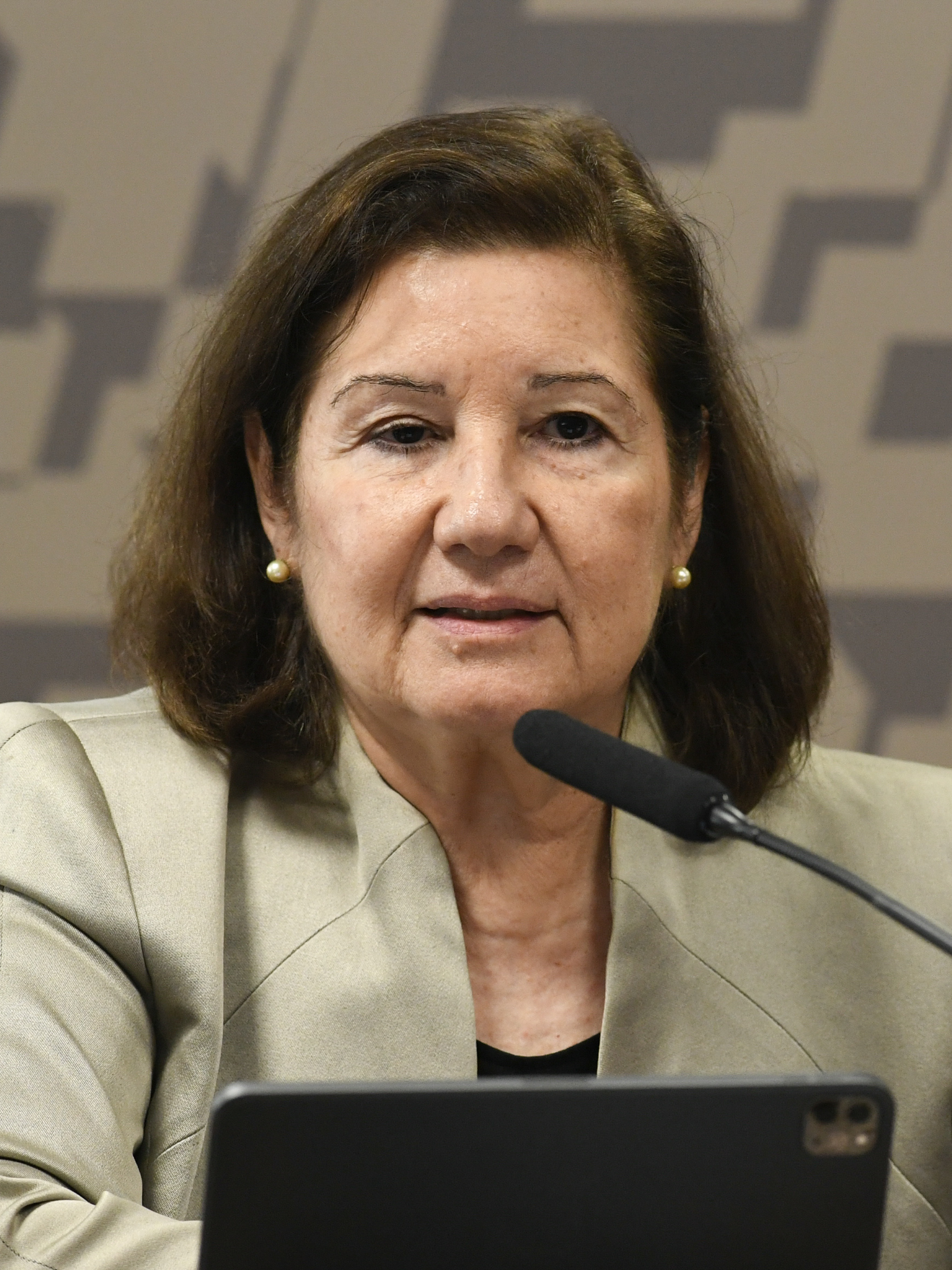
- Incumbent; Maria Luiza Ribeiro Viotti since 30 June 2023
- Ministry of Foreign Affairs
- Style: Madam Ambassador (informal); Her Excellency (diplomatic)
- Reports to: Minister of Foreign Affairs
- Seat: 3006 Massachusetts Ave NW; 20008; Washington, D.C.
- Appointer: The president with Senate advice and consent
- Term length: No fixed term
- Formation: 1 January 1824; 202 years ago
- First holder: José Silvestre Rebello as Chargé d'Affaires
- Website: Embassy of Brazil in Washington

The following is a list of ambassadors of Brazil, or other chiefs of mission, to the United States of America. The title given by the Ministry of Foreign Affairs of the Federative Republic of Brazil to this position is currently "Ambassador Extraordinary and Plenipotentiary" (Portuguese: Embaixador Extraordinário e Plenipotenciário). There have been fifty representatives of various ranks and titles from Brazil to the United States since diplomatic relations were inaugurated in 1824 to the present.

The United States of America was the second country to recognize Brazil's independence, which was proclaimed in September 1822, by the regent, heir and crown prince to the throne of the former United Kingdom of Portugal, Brazil and the Algarves, Pedro of the House of Braganza. He soon became Emperor Pedro I (reigned 1822–1831), of the Empire of Brazil, which endured under his son Pedro II until 1889, when the present republic and federation were established. The South American nation's first legation was thus established in Washington, only a quarter-century after the founding of the American national capital and federal district itself. The long Brazilian-North American diplomatic relationship and inter-continental friendship was founded on 26 May 1824, when José Silvestre Rebello presented his diplomatic accreditation credentials as Brazil's first Charge d'Affaires to President James Monroe, at the newly restored Executive Mansion, now acquiring its new nickname and title of the White House. He represented the new Emperor and Empire of Brazil for over five years to August 1829.

In 1905, the United States Legation representing the U.S. Department of State and its Secretary of State in the original capital city of Rio de Janeiro was raised to a full embassy under President Theodore Roosevelt, similar to the gradual increased status of diplomatic missions across the board in international relations in the 20th century.

== Empire of Brazil (1822–1889) ==
Portrait	Representative	Title	Presentation of credentials	Termination of mission	Appointed by
	José Silvestre Rebello	Chargé d'Affaires	26 May 1824	10 August 1829	Pedro I
	José de Araújo Ribeiro	Chargé d'Affaires	11 August 1829	14 February 1833	Pedro I
	José Francisco de Paula Cavalcante de Albuquerque	Chargé d'Affaires	30 December 1833	22 July 1838	Pedro II
	Ernesto Ferreira França	Resident Minister	23 July 1838	28 October 1839	Pedro II
	Pedro Rodrigues Fernandes Chaves	Chargé d'Affaires	17 March 1840	30 October 1840	Pedro II
	Gaspar José Lisboa	Resident Minister	29 May 1841	8 July 1847	Pedro II
	Gaspar José Lisboa	Envoy Extraordinary and Minister Plenipotentiary	29 May 1841	8 July 1847	Pedro II
	Sérgio Teixeira de Macedo	Envoy Extraordinary and Minister Plenipotentiary	12 March 1849	1 July 1851	Pedro II
	Francisco Ignácio de Carvalho Moreira	Envoy Extraordinary and Minister Plenipotentiary	21 September 1852	31 July 1855	Pedro II
	José Francisco de Paula Cavalcante de Albuquerque	Envoy Extraordinary and Minister Plenipotentiary	29 May 1856	25 August 1858	Pedro II
	Miguel Maria Lisboa	Envoy Extraordinary and Minister Plenipotentiary	3 October 1859	27 April 1864	Pedro II
	Joaquim Maria Nascentes de Azambuja	Envoy Extraordinary and Minister Plenipotentiary	23 September 1865	17 May 1867	Pedro II
	Gonçalves de Magalhães	Envoy Extraordinary and Minister Plenipotentiary	5 July 1867	13 October 1870	Pedro II
	Antônio Pedro de Carvalho Borges	Envoy Extraordinary and Minister Plenipotentiary	9 October 1871	7 December 1880	Pedro II
	Felippe Lopes Neto	Envoy Extraordinary and Minister Plenipotentiary	24 October 1882	14 August 1883	Pedro II
	José Gurgel do Amaral Valente	Chargé d'Affaires ad interim	15 August 1883	8 December 1885	Pedro II
	Marcos Antônio de Araújo e Abreu	Envoy Extraordinary and Minister Plenipotentiary	9 December 1885	16 May 1888	Pedro II
	José Gurgel do Amaral Valente	Envoy Extraordinary and Minister Plenipotentiary	10 November 1889	21 January 1891	Pedro II

== First Brazilian Republic (1889–1930) ==
Portrait	Representative	Title	Presentation of credentials	Termination of mission	Appointed by
	Salvador Furtado de Mendonça Drummond	Envoy Extraordinary and Minister Plenipotentiary	22 January 1891	17 May 1898	Deodoro da Fonseca
	Assis Brasil	Envoy Extraordinary and Minister Plenipotentiary	6 June 1898	22 April 1903	Prudente de Morais
	Alfredo de Moraes Gomes Ferreira	Envoy Extraordinary and Minister Plenipotentiary ad interim	28 December 1904	23 May 1905	Rodrigues Alves
	Joaquim Nabuco	Ambassador Extraordinary and Plenipotentiary	24 May 1905	17 January 1910	Rodrigues Alves
	Domício da Gama	Ambassador Extraordinary and Plenipotentiary	16 June 1911	22 October 1918	Hermes da Fonseca
	Augusto Cochrane de Alencar	Ambassador Extraordinary and Plenipotentiary	26 May 1920	5 March 1924	Epitácio Pessoa
	Silvino Gurgel do Amaral	Ambassador Extraordinary and Plenipotentiary	19 June 1925	9 April 1931	Artur Bernardes

== Estado Novo (1930–1946) ==
Portrait	Representative	Title	Presentation of credentials	Termination of mission	Appointed by
	Rinaldo de Lima e Silva	Ambassador Extraordinary and Plenipotentiary	24 April 1931	16 May 1934	Getúlio Vargas
	Oswaldo Aranha	Ambassador Extraordinary and Plenipotentiary	2 October 1934	11 December 1937	Getúlio Vargas
	Mário de Pimentel Brandão	Ambassador Extraordinary and Plenipotentiary	28 April 1938	3 January 1939	Getúlio Vargas
	Carlos Martins Pereira e Souza	Ambassador Extraordinary and Plenipotentiary	8 March 1939	20 April 1948	Getúlio Vargas

== Fourth Brazilian Republic (1946–1964) ==
Portrait	Representative	Title	Presentation of credentials	Termination of mission	Appointed by
	Maurício Nabuco	Ambassador Extraordinary and Plenipotentiary	1 June 1948	28 October 1951	Eurico Gaspar Dutra
	Walter Moreira Salles	Ambassador Extraordinary and Plenipotentiary	12 June 1952	18 August 1953	Getúlio Vargas
	João Carlos Muniz	Ambassador Extraordinary and Plenipotentiary	20 October 1953	12 July 1956	Getúlio Vargas
	Ernani do Amaral Peixoto	Ambassador Extraordinary and Plenipotentiary	18 July 1956	18 May 1959	Juscelino Kubitschek
	Walter Moreira Salles	Ambassador Extraordinary and Plenipotentiary	23 July 1959	16 February 1961	Juscelino Kubitschek
	Roberto Campos	Ambassador Extraordinary and Plenipotentiary	18 October 1961	17 January 1964	João Goulart

== Military dictatorship (1964–1985) ==
Portrait	Representative	Title	Presentation of credentials	Termination of mission	Appointed by
	Juracy Magalhães	Ambassador Extraordinary and Plenipotentiary	9 July 1964	6 October 1965	Castelo Branco
	Vasco Tristão Leitão da Cunha	Ambassador Extraordinary and Plenipotentiary	2 February 1966	29 June 1968	Castelo Branco
	Mário Gibson Alves Barbosa	Ambassador Extraordinary and Plenipotentiary	21 February 1969	17 October 1969	Artur da Costa e Silva
	Mozart Gurgel Valente Jr.	Ambassador Extraordinary and Plenipotentiary	20 February 1970	19 December 1970	Emílio Garrastazu Médici
	João Augusto de Araújo Castro	Ambassador Extraordinary and Plenipotentiary	18 May 1971	9 December 1975	Emílio Garrastazu Médici
	João Batista Pinheiro	Ambassador Extraordinary and Plenipotentiary	10 June 1976	9 June 1979	Ernesto Geisel
	Antônio Francisco Azeredo da Silveira	Ambassador Extraordinary and Plenipotentiary	24 July 1979	1 August 1983	João Figueiredo
	Sérgio Corrêa da Costa	Ambassador Extraordinary and Plenipotentiary	5 September 1983	1 November 1986	João Figueiredo

== Sixth Brazilian Republic (1985–present) ==
Portrait	Representative	Title	Presentation of credentials	Termination of mission	Appointed by
	Marcílio Marques Moreira	Ambassador Extraordinary and Plenipotentiary	23 November 1986	24 August 1991	José Sarney
	Rubens Ricupero	Ambassador Extraordinary and Plenipotentiary	25 August 1991	11 August 1993	Fernando Collor de Mello
	Paulo Tarso Flecha de Lima	Ambassador Extraordinary and Plenipotentiary	12 November 1993	26 May 1999	Itamar Franco
	Rubens Antonio Barbosa	Ambassador Extraordinary and Plenipotentiary	8 June 1999	31 March 2004	Fernando Henrique Cardoso
	Roberto Abdenur	Ambassador Extraordinary and Plenipotentiary	3 April 2004	21 November 2006	Luiz Inácio Lula da Silva
	Antonio Patriota	Ambassador Extraordinary and Plenipotentiary	7 January 2007	4 October 2009	Luiz Inácio Lula da Silva
	Mauro Vieira	Ambassador Extraordinary and Plenipotentiary	6 January 2010	31 December 2014	Luiz Inácio Lula da Silva
	Luiz Alberto Figueiredo	Ambassador Extraordinary and Plenipotentiary	1 January 2015	16 August 2016	Dilma Rousseff
	Sérgio Amaral	Ambassador Extraordinary and Plenipotentiary	16 August 2016	3 June 2019	Michel Temer
	Nestor Forster	Chargé d'Affaires ad interim	3 June 2019	23 December 2020	Jair Bolsonaro
	Nestor Forster	Ambassador Extraordinary and Plenipotentiary	23 December 2020	30 June 2023	Jair Bolsonaro
	Maria Luiza Ribeiro Viotti	Ambassador Extraordinary and Plenipotentiary	30 June 2023	Incumbent	Luiz Inácio Lula da Silva

== See also ==
- List of ambassadors of the United States to Brazil
- Embassy of Brazil, Washington, D.C.
- Brazil–United States relations
