= Luiz Alberto Figueiredo =

Brazilian diplomat and politician

Luiz Alberto Figueiredo Machado
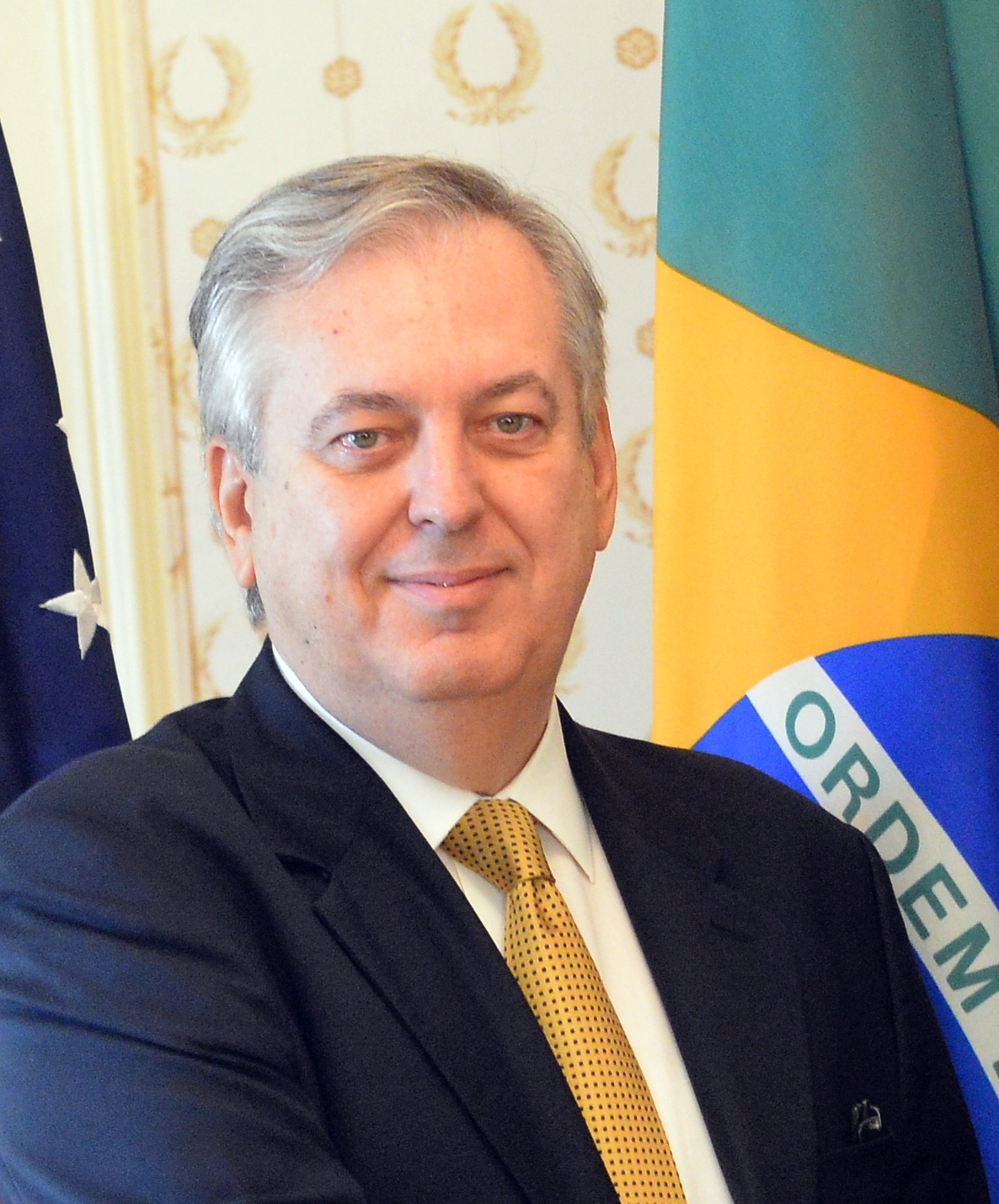

Brazilian Ambassador for Climate Change
- Incumbent
- Assumed office 17 February 2023
- President: Luiz Inácio Lula da Silva
- Preceded by: Office Established

Brazilian Ambassador to the United States
- In office 1 January 2015 – 16 August 2016
- President: Dilma Rousseff; Michel Temer
- Preceded by: Mauro Vieira
- Succeeded by: Sérgio Silva do Amaral

Minister of Foreign Affairs
- In office 28 August 2013 – 1 January 2015
- President: Dilma Rousseff
- Preceded by: Antonio Patriota
- Succeeded by: Mauro Vieira

Permanent Representative of Brazil to the United Nations
- In office June 2013 – August 2013
- Preceded by: Maria Luiza Ribeiro Viotti
- Succeeded by: Antonio Patriota

Personal details
- Born: 17 July 1955 (age 71) Rio de Janeiro, Rio de Janeiro, Brazil
- Children: 3
- Profession: Diplomat, Politician

Luiz Alberto Figueiredo Machado (born 17 July 1955) is a diplomat who is currently serving as the Brazilian Ambassador for Climate Change since February 2023. He was the former Minister of External Relations, having succeeded Antonio Patriota and was succeeded by Mauro Vieira. Figueiredo took office as foreign minister on August 28, 2013., and left office on December 31, 2014.

== Biography ==
=== Early life ===
Luiz Figueiredo was born on July 17, 1955, in Rio de Janeiro holds a degree in law of the Federal University of Rio de Janeiro (UFRJ) in 1977 and graduated at the Rio Branco Institute (IRBr) in 1980.

=== Career ===
First assigned to New York in 1986 until 1989, he continued his professional career at Brazil's diplomatic missions in Santiago, Chile, serving until 1992. He has also held diplomatic positions in Washington, D.C. from 1996 to 1999, Ottawa from 1999 to 2002 and Paris, as representative to the United Nations Educational, Scientific and Cultural Organization (UNESCO), from 2003 to 2005.

He served as Director-General in the Ministry's Department of Environment and Special Affairs, and previously headed its Environmental Policy and Sustainable Development Divisions, as well as its Division on Sea, Antarctic and Outer Space Affairs. He came Under-Secretary for Environment, Energy, Science and Technology in Brazil's Foreign Ministry since 2011. From June to August 2013 he was the Permanent Representative of Brazil to the United Nations.

In February 2023, he was appointed to serve as the Brazilian Ambassador for Climate Change.

Diplomatic posts
Preceded by Mauro Vieira	Brazilian Ambassador to the United States; 2015–2016	Succeeded by Sérgio Silva do Amaral
Preceded by Maria Luiza Ribeiro Viotti	Permanent Representative of Brazil to the United Nations; 2013	Succeeded by Antonio Patriota
Political offices
Preceded by Antonio Patriota	Minister of Foreign Affairs; 2013–2015	Succeeded by Mauro Vieira
