= Maria Luiza Ribeiro Viotti =

Brazilian diplomat

Her Excellency Maria Luiza Ribeiro Viotti
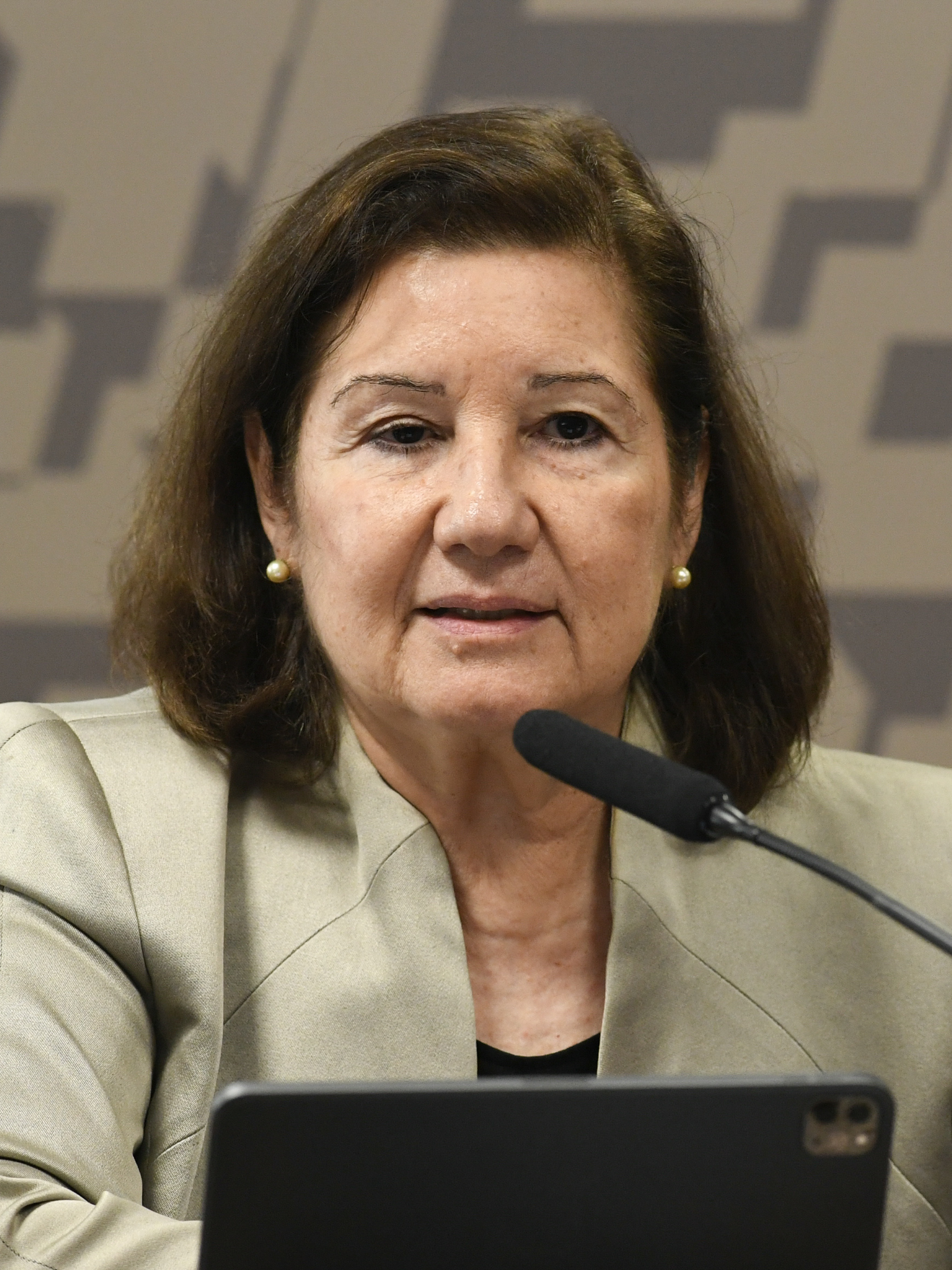

Ambassador of Brazil to the United States
- Incumbent
- Assumed office 30 June 2023
- President: Luiz Inácio Lula da Silva
- Preceded by: Nestor Forster

Chef de Cabinet to the Secretary-General of the United Nations
- In office 1 January 2017 – 1 January 2022
- Secretary-General: António Guterres
- Preceded by: Edmond Mulet
- Succeeded by: Courtenay Rattray

Ambassador of Brazil to Germany
- In office 16 January 2013 – 20 July 2016
- President: Dilma Rousseff; Michel Temer
- Preceded by: Everton Vieira Vargas
- Succeeded by: Mario Vilalva

Permanent Representative of Brazil to the United Nations
- In office 16 July 2007 – 15 January 2013
- President: Luiz Inácio Lula da Silva; Dilma Rousseff
- Preceded by: Ronaldo Sardenberg
- Succeeded by: Luiz Alberto Figueiredo

Chairwoman of the United Nations Security Council
- In office 1 February 2011 – 28 February 2011
- Preceded by: Ivan Barbalić
- Succeeded by: Li Baodong

Personal details
- Born: 27 March 1954 (age 72) Belo Horizonte, Minas Gerais, Brazil
- Education: University of Brasília
- Awards: Order of Military Merit (Grand Officer - Grande-Oficial)

Maria Luiza Ribeiro Viotti (born 27 March 1954) is a Brazilian diplomat and the current Ambassador of Brazil to the United States. Previously, she was Chef de Cabinet to UN Secretary General António Guterres. Viotti was the Ambassador of Brazil to Germany from 2013 until 2016, Permanent Representative of Brazil to the United Nations from 2007 until 2013, and President of the United Nations Security Council for the month of February 2011. She is married to Eduardo Baumgratz Viotti and has a son.

In early August 2026, Viotti's US visa was revoked, according to a senior US official, in response to disputes over Brazil refusal to accept of Trump administration nominee for ambassador to Brazil Daniel Perez and its denial of visas to several US officials who planned visits with Brazilian coup leader Jair Bolsonaro, his son, opposition candidate Flavio Bolsonaro and others to discuss election security in advance of its October 2026 presidential elections. The official indicated Viotti's visa could be restored once Brazil agreed to accept Perez nomination. The Brazilian government called the visa revocation a "deliberate escalation of hostile measures against Brazil, driven by ideological motives."

== Education ==
Viotti has a bachelor's degree in economics from the University of Brasília, which she received in 1979. She has a post-graduate degree in the same subject, which she completed in 1981, from the same university. She attended the Rio Branco Institute, the Brazilian diplomatic academy.

== Diplomatic career ==
Viotti joined the Brazilian Foreign Service in 1976. She held several positions within the Ministry of External Relations, including:

- Director-General of the Department of International Organizations;
- Director-General of the Department of Human Rights and Social Affairs;
- Secretary-General of the South America Division;
- Executive Coordinator in the cabinet of the Minister of External Relations.

=== Overseas assignments ===
Viotti served as Counselor at the Brazilian Embassy in La Paz, Bolivia, from 1993 to 1995, and from 1985 to 1989, Viotti served as a First Secretary at the Brazilian Mission to the United Nations, when she started to specialize in the UN System.

In 1999, Viotti returned to the Brazilian Mission to the United Nations as a Minister-Counselor. Viotti was the Vice-Chairperson of the Preparatory Committee for the Johannesburg World Summit on Sustainable Development and led Brazil's delegation to the negotiations in preparation for the International Conference on Financing for Development. She was also a member of the Economic and Social Council’s Ad Hoc Group on Guinea-Bissau.

In 2005, Viotti assumed the post of Chargé d'affaires of Brazil to the United Nations, and she was appointed Permanent Representative of Brazil to the United Nations by President Luiz Inácio Lula da Silva on 5 January 2007. Viotti presented her credentials to UN Secretary-General Ban Ki-moon on 25 July 2007. Viotti was the President of the United Nations Security Council for the month of February 2011, when Brazil held the rotating presidency of the Council. Viotti was succeeded by Luiz Alberto Figueiredo on 16 January 2013.

At the end of 2015, Viotti was appointed as a future candidate to the post of Secretary-General of the UN. Being a close friend of several Permanent Representatives for decades; having played an important part in assuring the stability and conciliation of political forces in Afghanistan; and having long worked for human rights advances and social development in the poorest countries, she was the Brazilian favorite.

"As a multidimensional threat, terrorism must be addressed from a holistic approach that takes into consideration the diversity of its underlying causes. Radicalism and violence often stem from longstanding social, political, economic and cultural exclusion, amidst which a culture of intolerance may thrive. Development and inclusiveness are key tools to combat terrorism".

From 2016, Viotti served as Under-Secretary for Asia and the Pacific at the Brazilian Ministry of Foreign Affairs, where she had special responsibility for work on BRICS.

== Career with the United Nations ==
In December 2016, incoming UN Secretary General António Guterres appointed her as his Chef de Cabinet.

== Other activities ==
- United Nations System Staff College (UNSSC), chair of the board of governors

== See also ==
- Brazil and the United Nations
- List of current permanent representatives to the United Nations

Diplomatic posts
Preceded by Everton Vieira Vargas	Brazilian Ambassador to Germany; 2013–2016	Succeeded by Mario Vilalva
Preceded by Nestor Forster	Brazilian Ambassador to the United States; 2023–present	Incumbent
Positions in intergovernmental organisations
Preceded by Ronaldo Mota Sardenberg	Permanent Representative of Brazil to the United Nations; 2007–2013	Succeeded by Luiz Alberto Figueiredo
Preceded by Ivan Barbalić	Chairwoman of the United Nations Security Council; February 2011	Succeeded by Li Baodong
Preceded by Edmond Mulet	Chef de Cabinet to the Secretary-General of the United Nations; 2017–2022	Succeeded by Courtenay Rattray
