= Cabinet of Fernando Henrique Cardoso =

FHC Cabinet
- Cabinet of Brazil
- 1995–2003
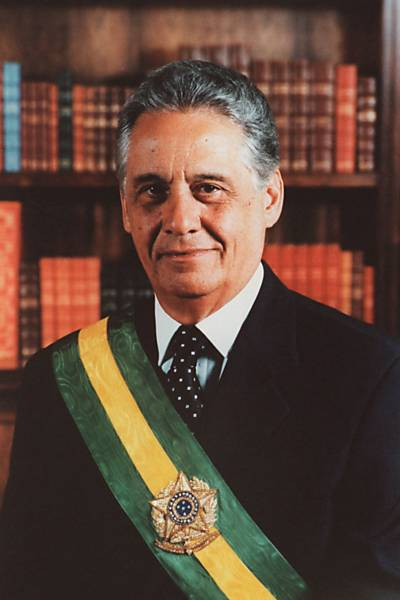
- Date formed: 1 January 1995
- Date dissolved: 1 January 2003

People and organisations
- President: Fernando Henrique Cardoso
- President's history: Former Minister of Finance; (1993–1994); Former Minister of Foreign Affairs; (1992–1993)
- No. of ministers: 30
- Member parties: 1995–1999: Brazilian Democratic Movement Party; Liberal Front Party; Brazilian Progressive Party; Brazilian Social Democracy Party; Brazilian Labour Party; Liberal Party; Social Democratic Party; 1999–2003: Brazilian Democratic Movement Party; Brazilian Social Democracy Party; Liberal Front Party; Brazilian Progressive Party; Brazilian Labour Party; Liberal Party; Social Liberal Party; Social Labour Party
- Status in legislature: Majority coalition
- Opposition parties: 1995–1999: Workers' Party; Democratic Labour Party; Brazilian Socialist Party; Communist Party of Brazil; Party of National Mobilization; Popular Socialist Party; National Reconstruction Party; Green Party; 1999–2003: Workers' Party; Democratic Labour Party; Brazilian Socialist Party; Communist Party of Brazil; Party of National Mobilization; Popular Socialist Party; Party of the Reconstruction of the National Order; Green Party

History
- Elections: 1994 general election 1998 general election
- Legislature terms: 50th Legislature of the National Congress; 51st Legislature of the National Congress
- Advice and consent: Federal Senate
- Predecessor: Cabinet of Itamar Franco
- Successor: First cabinet of Lula da Silva

After the 1994 election, Fernando Henrique Cardoso became 35th President of Brazil and the second president elected by direct popular vote after the redemocratization. His government was marked by economic stabilization after the consolidation of Plano Real, which he was part of. A second cabinet was formed after the 1998 election, the first when an incumbent president could run for a second consecutive term.

Portfolio	Minister	Took office	Left office	Party
Chief of Staff	Clóvis Carvalho	1 January 1995	1 January 1999	PSDB
Chief of Staff	Pedro Parente	1 January 1999	1 January 2003	PSDB
Secretary-General of the Presidency	Eduardo Jorge Pereira	1 January 1995	15 April 1998	PSDB
Secretary-General of the Presidency	Eduardo Graeff	15 April 1998	1 January 1999	Independent
Secretary-General of the Presidency	Aloysio Nunes	3 August 1999	14 November 2001	PSDB
Secretary-General of the Presidency	Arthur Virgílio Neto	14 November 2001	3 April 2002	PSDB
Secretary-General of the Presidency	Euclides Scalco	3 April 2002	1 January 2003	PSDB
Secretary of Human Rights	José Gregori	17 April 1997	26 June 2000	PSDB
Secretary of Human Rights	Gilberto Vergne Saboia	26 June 2000	2001	Independent
Secretary of Human Rights	Paulo Sérgio Pinheiro	2001	1 January 2003	Independent
Secretary of Institutional Security	Alberto Mendes Cardoso	1 January 1995	1 January 2003	Independent
Secretary of Social Communication	Sérgio Amaral	1 January 1995	17 May 1999	Independent
Secretary of Social Communication	Andrea Matarazzo	17 May 1999	10 December 2001	PSDB
Secretary of Social Communication	João Vieira da Costa	10 December 2001	1 January 2003	Independent
Minister of Aeronautics	Lt. Brig. Mauro Miranda Gandra	1 January 1995	20 November 1995	Independent
Minister of Aeronautics	Lt. Brig. Lélio Viana Lobo	20 November 1995	4 January 1999	Independent
Minister of Aeronautics	Lt. Brig. Walter Werner Bräuer	4 January 1999	10 June 1999	Independent
Attorney General	Geraldo Magela	5 July 1993	24 January 2000	Independent
Attorney General	Walter do Carmo Barletta	24 January 2000	31 January 2000	Independent
Attorney General	Gilmar Mendes	31 January 2000	20 June 2002	Independent
Attorney General	José Bonifácio de Andrada	20 June 2002	1 January 2003	Independent
Inspector General	Anadyr de Mendonça Rodrigues	3 April 2001	1 January 2003	Independent
Minister of Agrarian Development	Raul Jungmann	30 April 1996	4 April 2002	PPS
Minister of Agrarian Development	José Abrão	4 April 2002	1 January 2003	PSDB
Minister of Agriculture and Supply	José de Andrade Vieira	1 January 1995	2 May 1996	PTB
Minister of Agriculture and Supply	Arlindo Porto	2 May 1996	4 April 1998	PTB
Minister of Agriculture and Supply	Francisco Turra	7 April 1998	19 July 1999	PP
Minister of Agriculture and Supply	Pratini de Moraes	19 July 1999	1 January 2003	PP
Minister of the Army	Gen. Zenildo Gonzaga Zoroastro de Lucena	2 October 1992	1 January 1999	Independent
Minister of the Army	Gleuber Vieira	1 January 1999	10 June 1999	Independent
Minister of Communications	Sérgio Motta	1 January 1995	19 April 1998	PSDB
Minister of Communications	Luiz Mendonça de Barros	30 April 1998	1 January 1999	Independent
Minister of Communications	Pimenta da Veiga	1 January 1999	2 April 2002	PSDB
Minister of Communications	Juarez Quadros	2 April 2002	1 January 2003	Independent
Minister of Culture	Francisco Weffort	1 January 1995	1 January 2003	Independent
Minister of Defence	Élcio Álvares	10 June 1999	24 January 2000	PFL
Minister of Defence	Geraldo Magela	24 January 2000	1 January 2003	Independent
Minister of Development, Industry and Trade	Dorothea Werneck	1 January 1995	30 April 1996	Independent
Minister of Development, Industry and Trade	Francisco Dornelles	6 May 1996	30 March 1998	PP
Minister of Development, Industry and Trade	José Botafogo Gonçalves	30 March 1998	1 January 1999	Independent
Minister of Development, Industry and Trade	Celso Lafer	1 January 1999	18 July 1999	Independent
Minister of Development, Industry and Trade	Clóvis Carvalho	18 July 1999	8 September 1999	PSDB
Minister of Development, Industry and Trade	Alcides Lopes Tápias	14 September 1999	31 July 2001	Independent
Minister of Development, Industry and Trade	Sérgio Amaral	31 July 2001	1 January 2003	Independent
Minister of Education	Paulo Renato Souza	1 January 1995	1 January 2003	PSDB
Minister of Environment	Gustavo Krause	1 January 1995	1 January 1999	PFL
Minister of Environment	Sarney Filho	1 January 1999	5 March 2002	PFL
Minister of Environment	José Carlos Carvalho	5 March 2002	1 January 2003	Independent
Minister of Finance	Pedro Malan	1 January 1995	1 January 2003	Independent
Minister of Foreign Affairs	Luiz Felipe Lampreia	1 January 1995	12 January 2001	Independent
Minister of Foreign Affairs	Luiz de Seixas Corrêa	12 January 2001	29 January 2001	Independent
Minister of Foreign Affairs	Celso Lafer	29 January 2001	1 January 2003	Independent
Minister of Health	Adib Jatene	1 January 1995	6 November 1996	Independent
Minister of Health	José Carlos Seixas	6 November 1996	13 December 1996	Independent
Minister of Health	Carlos Albuquerque	13 December 1996	31 March 1998	PSDB
Minister of Health	José Serra	31 March 1998	20 February 2002	PSDB
Minister of Health	Barjas Negri	20 February 2002	1 January 2003	PSDB
Minister of Justice	Nelson Jobim	1 January 1995	8 April 1997	MDB
Minister of Justice	Milton Seligman	8 April 1997	22 May 1997	MDB
Minister of Justice	Iris Rezende	22 May 1997	1 April 1998	MDB
Minister of Justice	José de Jesus Filho	1 April 1998	7 April 1998	Independent
Minister of Justice	Renan Calheiros	7 April 1998	19 July 1999	MDB
Minister of Justice	José Carlos Dias	19 July 1999	14 April 2000	Independent
Minister of Justice	José Gregori	14 April 2000	14 November 2001	MDB
Minister of Justice	Aloysio Nunes	14 November 2001	3 April 2002	PSDB
Minister of Justice	Miguel Reale Júnior	3 April 2002	10 July 2002	PSDB
Minister of Justice	Paulo de Tarso Ribeiro	10 July 2002	1 January 2003	Independent
Minister of Labour and Employment	Paulo de Tarso Paiva	1 January 1995	30 March 1998	Independent
Minister of Labour and Employment	Antonio Anastasia	30 March 1998	6 April 1998	PSDB
Minister of Labour and Employment	Edward Swaelen	6 April 1998	1 January 1999	Independent
Minister of Labour and Employment	Francisco Dornelles	1 January 1999	8 April 2002	PP
Minister of Labour and Employment	Paulo Jobim Filho	8 April 2002	1 January 2003	Independent
Minister of Mines and Energy	Raimundo Mendes de Brito	1 January 1995	1 January 1999	Independent
Minister of Mines and Energy	Rodolpho Tourinho Neto	1 January 1999	22 February 2001	PFL
Minister of Mines and Energy	Hélio Ramos Filho	22 February 2001	13 March 2001	Independent
Minister of Mines and Energy	José Jorge	13 March 2001	8 March 2002	PFL
Minister of Mines and Energy	Pedro Parente	8 March 2002	3 April 2002	PSDB
Minister of Mines and Energy	Francisco Gomide	3 April 2002	1 January 2003	Independent
Minister of National Integration	Fernando Bezerra	19 July 1999	20 June 2001	PTB
Minister of National Integration	Ramez Tebet	20 June 2001	15 September 2001	MDB
Minister of National Integration	Ney Suassuna	15 September 2001	5 April 2002	MDB
Minister of National Integration	Luciano Barbosa	5 April 2002	1 January 2003	MDB
Minister of the Navy	Adm. Mauro César Rodrigues Pereira	1 January 1995	1 January 1999	Independent
Minister of the Navy	Adm. Sérgio Gitirana Florêncio Chagasteles	1 January 1999	10 June 1999	Independent
Minister of Planning, Budget and Management	José Serra	1 January 1995	30 April 1996	PSDB
Minister of Planning, Budget and Management	Antônio Kandir	4 June 1996	30 March 1998	PSDB
Minister of Planning, Budget and Management	Paulo Almeida Paiva	30 March 1998	30 March 1999	Independent
Minister of Planning, Budget and Management	Pedro Parente	30 March 1999	18 July 1999	PSDB
Minister of Planning, Budget and Management	Martus Tavares	18 July 1999	3 April 2002	Independent
Minister of Planning, Budget and Management	Guilherme Gomes Dias	3 April 2002	1 January 2003	Independent
Minister of Science and Technology	José Israel Vargas	27 October 1992	1 January 1999	Independent
Minister of Science and Technology	Luiz Carlos Bresser-Pereira	1 January 1999	21 July 1999	Independent
Minister of Science and Technology	Ronaldo Sardenberg	21 July 1999	1 January 2003	PSDB
Minister of Social Security	Reinhold Stephanes	1 January 1995	3 April 1998	MDB
Minister of Social Security	Waldeck Ornelas	7 April 1998	24 February 2001	PFL
Minister of Social Security	Roberto Brandt	13 March 2001	8 March 2002	PFL
Minister of Social Security	José Cechin	8 March 2002	1 January 2003	Independent
Minister of Sports	Pelé	1 January 1995	1 January 1999	Independent
Minister of Sports	Rafael Greca	1 January 1999	5 May 2000	PFL
Minister of Sports	Carlos Melles	9 May 2000	8 March 2002	PFL
Minister of Sports	Caio Cibella de Carvalho	8 March 2002	1 January 2003	Independent
Minister of Transport	Odacir Klein	1 January 1995	15 August 1996	MDB
Minister of Transport	Alcides Saldanha	15 August 1996	21 May 1997	MDB
Minister of Transport	Eliseu Padilha	21 May 1997	14 November 2001	MDB
Minister of Transport	Alderico Lima	14 November 2001	2 April 2002	Independent
Minister of Transport	João de Almeida Sousa	2 April 2002	1 January 2003	MDB

== Non-cabinet positions ==
Portfolio	Minister	Took office	Left office	Party
President of the Central Bank of Brazil	Gustavo Franco	1 January 1995	11 January 1995	PSDB
President of the Central Bank of Brazil	Pérsio Arida	11 January 1995	13 June 1995	Independent
President of the Central Bank of Brazil	Gustavo Loyola	13 June 1995	20 August 1997	Independent
President of the Central Bank of Brazil	Gustavo Franco	20 August 1997	4 March 1999	PSDB
President of the Central Bank of Brazil	Armínio Fraga	4 March 1999	1 January 2003	Independent
Chairman of the Brazilian Development Bank	Edmar Bacha	January 1995	November 1995	Independent
Chairman of the Brazilian Development Bank	Luiz Carlos Mendonça de Barros	November 1995	April 1998	Independent
Chairman of the Brazilian Development Bank	André Lara Resende	April 1998	November 1998	Independent
Chairman of the Brazilian Development Bank	José Borges de Castro Filho	November 1998	July 1999	Independent
Chairman of the Brazilian Development Bank	Andrea Sandro Calabi	July 1999	February 2000	Independent
Chairman of the Brazilian Development Bank	Francisco Gros	February 2000	January 2002	Independent
Chairman of the Brazilian Development Bank	Eleazar de Carvalho Filho	January 2002	January 2003	Independent
CEO of Petrobras	Joel Mendes Renní	18 November 1992	8 March 1999	Independent
CEO of Petrobras	José Coutinho Barbosa	8 March 1999	24 March 1999	Independent
CEO of Petrobras	Henri Philippe Reichstul	24 March 1999	21 December 2001	Independent
CEO of Petrobras	Francisco Gros	2 January 2002	2 January 2003	Independent
Commander of the Brazilian Army	Gen. Gleuber Vieira	10 June 1999	1 January 2003	Independent
Commander of the Brazilian Navy	Adm. Sérgio Gitirana Florêncio Chagasteles	10 June 1999	3 January 2003	Independent
Commander of the Brazilian Air Force	Lt. Brig. Walter Werner Bräuer	10 June 1999	21 December 1999	Independent
Commander of the Brazilian Air Force	Lt. Brig. Carlos de Almeida Baptista	21 December 1999	1 January 2003	Independent
