= Cabinet of Itamar Franco =

Franco Cabinet
- Cabinet of Brazil
- 1992–1995
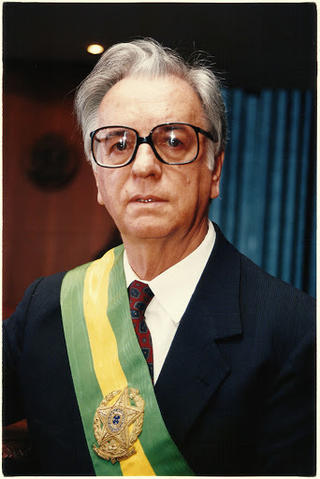
- Date formed: 2 October 1992
- Date dissolved: 1 January 1995

People and organisations
- President: Itamar Franco
- President's history: Former Vice President of Brazil; (1990–1992); Former Senator for Minas Gerais; (1975–1990)
- No. of ministers: 18
- Member parties: Brazilian Democratic Movement Party; Liberal Front Party; Democratic Social Party; National Reconstruction Party; Brazilian Labour Party; Christian Democratic Party; Liberal Party; Social Christian Party; Renovator Labour Party; Social Labour Party; Social Democratic Party; Brazilian Socialist Party
- Status in legislature: Coalition
- Opposition parties: Democratic Labour Party; Workers' Party; Communist Party of Brazil; Brazilian Communist Party

History
- Legislature term: 49th Legislature of the National Congress
- Advice and consent: Federal Senate
- Incoming formation: Impeachment of Fernando Collor
- Predecessor: Cabinet of Fernando Collor
- Successor: Cabinet of Fernando Henrique Cardoso

After the suspension of president Fernando Collor de Mello in October 1992 due to his impeachment process, vice president Itamar Franco assumed as acting president and formed his cabinet, which was kept after his resignation in December.

Cabinet members
Portfolio	Minister	Took office	Left office	Party
Chief of Staff	Henrique Hargreaves	2 October 1992	1 November 1993	Independent
Chief of Staff	Tarcísio de Almeida Cunha	1 November 1993	8 February 1994	Independent
Chief of Staff	Henrique Hargreaves	8 February 1994	1 January 1995	Independent
Secretary-General of the Presidency	Mauro Durante	2 October 1992	1 January 1995	Independent
Secretary of Planning, Budget and Coordination	Paulo Roberto Haddad	19 October 1992	26 January 1993	Independent
Secretary of Planning, Budget and Coordination	Yeda Crusius	26 January 1993	7 May 1993	PSDB
Secretary of Planning, Budget and Coordination	Alexis Stepanenko	7 May 1993	3 March 1994	Independent
Secretary of Planning, Budget and Coordination	Beni Veras	3 March 1994	1 January 1995	PSDB
Attorney General	José de Castro Ferreira	12 February 1993	3 May 1993	Independent
Attorney General	Alexandre de Paula Dupeyrat Martins	3 May 1993	30 June 1993	Independent
Attorney General	Tarcísio Carlos de Almeida Cunha	30 June 1993	5 July 1993	Independent
Attorney General	Geraldo Magela	5 July 1993	24 January 2000	Independent
Minister of Aeronautics	Lt. Brig. Lélio Viana Lobo	2 October 1992	1 January 1995	Independent
Minister of Agriculture, Supply and Agrarian Reform	Lázaro Barbosa	2 October 1992	25 May 1993	MDB
Minister of Agriculture, Supply and Agrarian Reform	Wilson Brandi Romão	25 May 1993	5 June 1993	Independent
Minister of Agriculture, Supply and Agrarian Reform	Nuri Andraus Gassani	5 June 1993	16 June 1993	Independent
Minister of Agriculture, Supply and Agrarian Reform	Barroz Munhoz	16 June 1993	1 September 1993	MDB
Minister of Agriculture, Supply and Agrarian Reform	José Eduardo de Andrade Vieira	1 September 1993	13 October 1993	PTB
Minister of Agriculture, Supply and Agrarian Reform	Dejandir Dalpasquale	13 October 1993	21 December 1993	MDB
Minister of Agriculture, Supply and Agrarian Reform	Alberto Duque Portugal	21 December 1993	25 January 1994	Independent
Minister of Agriculture, Supply and Agrarian Reform	Sinval Guazzelli	25 January 1994	1 January 1995	MDB
Minister of the Army	Gen. Zenildo de Lucena	2 October 1992	1 January 1999	Independent
Minister of Communications	Hugo Napoleão Neto	19 October 1992	23 December 1993	PFL
Minister of Communications	Djalma Bastos de Morais	23 December 1993	1 January 1995	Independent
Minister of Culture	Antônio Houaiss	20 October 1992	1 September 1993	PSB
Minister of Culture	Jerônimo Moscardo	1 September 1993	9 December 1993	Independent
Minister of Culture	Luiz Roberto Nascimento Silva	9 December 1993	1 January 1995	Independent
Minister of Education	Murílio de Avellar Hingel	2 October 1992	1 January 1995	Independent
Minister of Environment	Fernando Coutinho Jorge	19 October 1992	16 September 1993	PSDB
Minister of Environment	Rubens Ricupero	16 September 1993	5 April 1994	Independent
Minister of Environment	Henrique Brandão Cavalcanti	5 April 1994	1 January 1995	Independent
Minister of Finance	Gustavo Krause	2 October 1992	16 December 1992	PFL
Minister of Finance	Paulo Roberto Haddad	16 December 1992	1 March 1993	Independent
Minister of Finance	Eliseu Resende	1 March 1993	19 May 1993	PFL
Minister of Finance	Fernando Henrique Cardoso	19 May 1993	30 March 1994	PSDB
Minister of Finance	Rubens Ricupero	30 March 1994	6 September 1994	Independent
Minister of Finance	Ciro Gomes	6 September 1994	1 January 1995	PSDB
Minister of Foreign Affairs	Fernando Henrique Cardoso	2 October 1992	20 May 1993	PSDB
Minister of Foreign Affairs	Luiz Felipe Lampreia	20 May 1993	20 July 1993	Independent
Minister of Foreign Affairs	Celso Amorim	20 July 1993	1 January 1995	MDB
Minister of Health	Jamil Haddad	8 October 1992	18 August 1993	PSB
Minister of Health	Saulo Moreira	19 August 1993	30 August 1993	MDB
Minister of Health	Henrique Santillo	30 August 1993	1 January 1995	PP
Minister of Industry, Trade and Tourism	José Eduardo de Andrade Vieira	19 October 1992	23 December 1993	PTB
Minister of Industry, Trade and Tourism	Ailton Barcelos Fernandes	23 December 1993	25 January 1994	Independent
Minister of Industry, Trade and Tourism	Élcio Álvares	25 January 1994	1 January 1995	PFL
Minister of Justice	Maurício Corrêa	2 October 1992	5 April 1994	PSDB
Minister of Justice	Alexandre Dupeyrat	5 April 1994	1 January 1995	Independent
Minister of Labour	Walter Barelli	4 October 1992	4 May 1994	PSDB
Minister of Labour	Marcelo Pimentel	4 May 1994	1 January 1995	Independent
Minister of Mines and Energy	Paulino de Vasconcellos	8 October 1992	28 December 1993	PFL
Minister of Mines and Energy	José Israel Vargas	28 December 1993	3 March 1994	Independent
Minister of Mines and Energy	Alexis Stepanenko	3 March 1994	20 September 1994	Independent
Minister of Mines and Energy	Delcídio do Amaral	20 September 1994	1 January 1995	PSDB
Minister of the Navy	Adm. Ivan da Silveira Serpa	8 October 1992	1 January 1995	Independent
Minister of Science and Technology	José Israel Vargas	27 October 1992	1 January 1999	Independent
Minister of Social Security	Antônio Britto	15 October 1992	15 December 1993	MDB
Minister of Social Security	Sérgio Cutolo	15 December 1993	1 January 1995	Independent
Minister of Transport	Alberto Goldman	2 October 1992	21 December 1993	MDB
Minister of Transport	Margarida Coimbra	21 December 1993	3 March 1994	Independent
Minister of Transport	Rubens Bayma Denys	3 March 1994	1 January 1995	Independent

== Non-cabinet positions ==
Cabinet members
Portfolio	Minister	Took office	Left office	Party
President of the Central Bank of Brazil	Gustavo Loyola	13 November 1992	29 March 1993	Independent
President of the Central Bank of Brazil	Paulo César Ximenes	29 March 1993	9 September 1993	Independent
President of the Central Bank of Brazil	Pedro Malan	9 September 1993	1 January 1995	Independent
Chairman of the Brazilian Development Bank	Antonio Barros de Castro	October 1992	March 1993	Independent
Chairman of the Brazilian Development Bank	Luiz Carlos Delben Leite	March 1993	August 1993	Independent
Chairman of the Brazilian Development Bank	Pérsio Arida	September 1993	January 1995	Independent
CEO of Petrobras	Joel Mendes Rennó	18 November 1992	8 March 1999	Independent
