= Ministry of Defence (Brazil) =

Brazilian government ministry

Ministry of Defense
- Ministério da Defesa

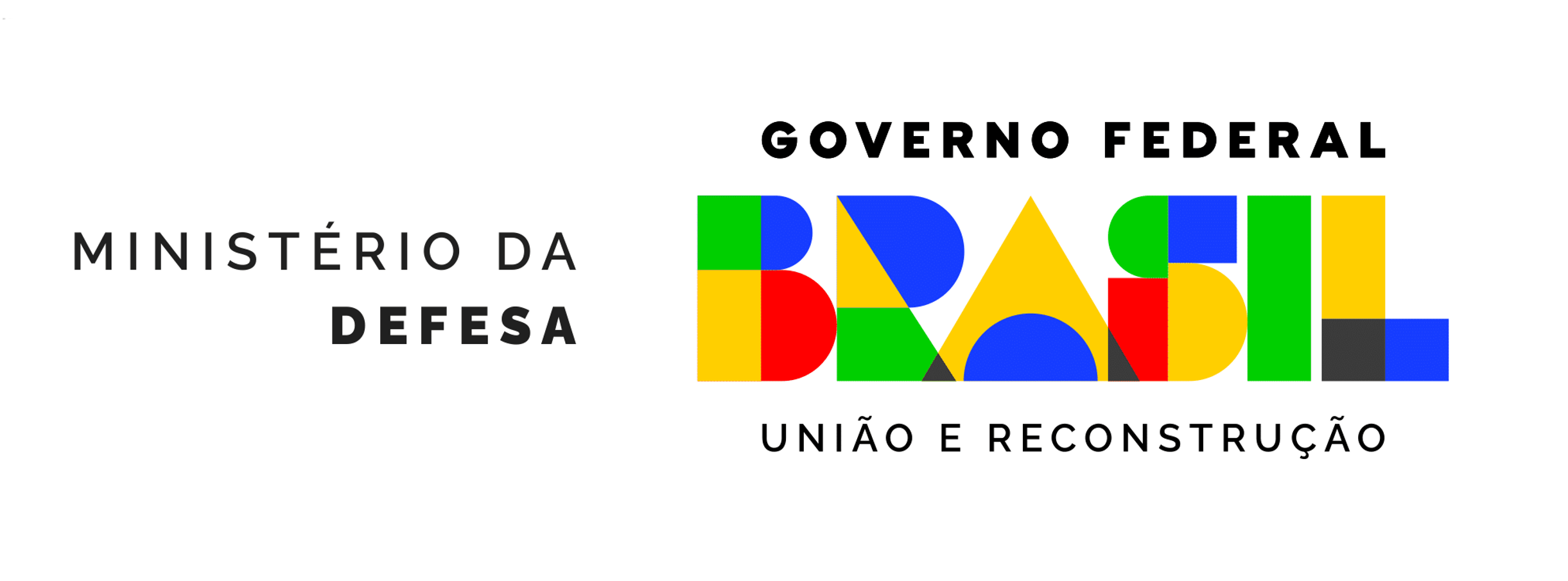

- Ministry headquarters in Brasília

Agency overview
- Formed: 10 June 1999; 27 years ago
- Type: Ministry
- Jurisdiction: Federal government of Brazil
- Headquarters: Esplanada dos Ministérios, Bloco Q Brasília, Federal District; 15.7963°S 47.8689°W
- Annual budget: $122.62 b BRL (2023)
- Minister responsible: José Múcio
- Agency executives: Adm Renato de Aguiar Freire, Chief of the Joint Staff; Luiz Henrique Pochyly, General Secretary
- Website: www.gov.br/defesa/

The Ministry of Defense (Portuguese: Ministério da Defesa) of Brazil is the civilian cabinet organization responsible for managing the military of Brazil. It is Brazil's ministry of defense. It is headed by the Minister of State of Defence.

The Ministry of Defense has three major components under its command structure – the Army Command, the Navy Command, and the Air Force Command. Among the many agencies operated by the Ministry of Defense are the National Civil Aviation Agency, the Infraero, and the Superior War School. The ministry is headquartered in the Ministries Esplanade section of the Monumental Axis, Brasília.

== Defense policy ==
Brazil's national defense policy is outlined in the National Defense Policy, the National Mobilization Policy and the National Defense Strategy.

== List of ministers of defense ==
No.	Portrait	Minister of State	Took office	Left office	Time in office	Party	President
1	Élcio Álvares	Élcio Álvares (1932–2016)	10 June 1999	24 January 2000	228 days	PFL	Fernando Henrique Cardoso (PSDB)
2	Geraldo Magela	Geraldo Magela (1935–2024)	24 January 2000	1 January 2003	2 years, 342 days	Independent	Fernando Henrique Cardoso (PSDB)
3	José Viegas Filho	José Viegas Filho (born 1942)	1 January 2003	8 November 2004	1 year, 312 days	Independent	Luiz Inácio Lula da Silva (PT)
4	José Alencar	José Alencar (1931–2011)	8 November 2004	31 March 2006	1 year, 143 days	Republicanos	Luiz Inácio Lula da Silva (PT)
5	Waldir Pires	Waldir Pires (1926–2018)	31 March 2006	25 June 2007	1 year, 86 days	PT	Luiz Inácio Lula da Silva (PT)
6	Nelson Jobim	Nelson Jobim (born 1946)	25 June 2007	5 August 2011	4 years, 41 days	MDB	Luiz Inácio Lula da Silva (PT); Dilma Rousseff (PT)
7	Celso Amorim	Celso Amorim (born 1942)	6 August 2011	1 January 2015	3 years, 148 days	PT	Dilma Rousseff (PT)
8	Jaques Wagner	Jaques Wagner (born 1951)	1 January 2015	2 October 2015	274 days	PT	Dilma Rousseff (PT)
9	Aldo Rebelo	Aldo Rebelo (born 1956)	2 October 2015	12 May 2016	223 days	PCdoB	Dilma Rousseff (PT)
10	Raul Jungmann	Raul Jungmann (1952–2026)	12 May 2016	27 February 2018	1 year, 291 days	PPS	Michel Temer (MDB)
11	Joaquim Silva e Luna	Joaquim Silva e Luna (born 1949)	27 February 2018	1 January 2019	308 days	Independent	Michel Temer (MDB)
12	Fernando Azevedo e Silva	Fernando Azevedo e Silva (born 1954)	1 January 2019	29 March 2021	2 years, 87 days	Independent	Jair Bolsonaro (PSL)
13	Walter Braga Netto	Walter Braga Netto (born 1957)	29 March 2021	1 April 2022	1 year, 3 days	Independent; PL	Jair Bolsonaro (Ind)
14	Paulo Sérgio Nogueira	Paulo Sérgio Nogueira (born 1958)	1 April 2022	1 January 2023	275 days	Independent	Jair Bolsonaro (PL)
15	José Múcio	José Múcio (born 1948)	1 January 2023	Incumbent	3 years, 282 days	PTB; PRD	Luiz Inácio Lula da Silva (PT)

== See also ==
- National Defence Council
- Federal institutions of Brazil
- Joint Staff of the Armed Forces

== Notes and references ==
4. http://www.aereo.jor.br/2017/01/12/2017-orcamento-da-defesa-do-brasil/
