= José Alencar =

Vice President of Brazil from 2003 to 2011

His Excellency José Alencar
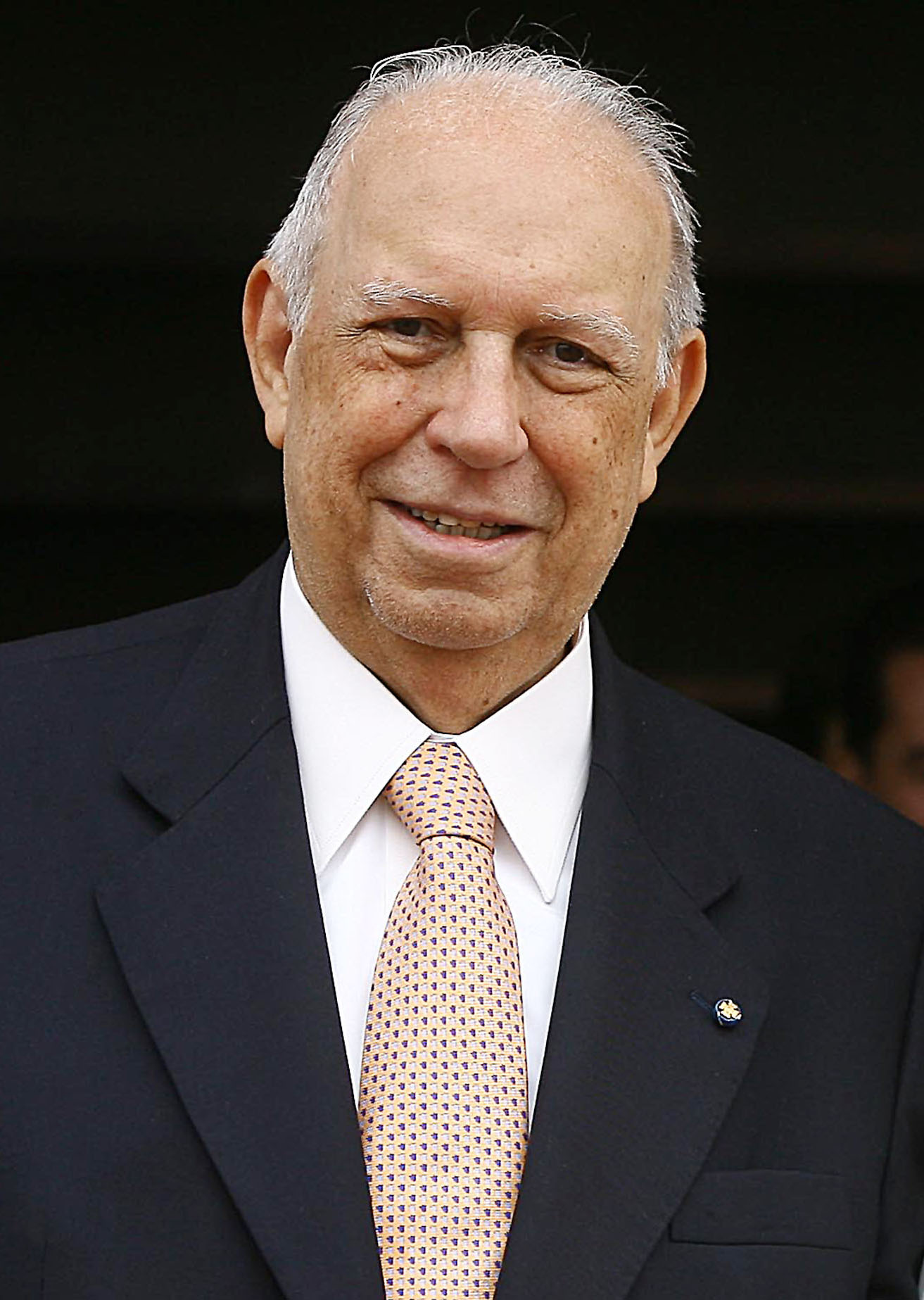
- Alencar in 2007

23rd Vice President of Brazil
- In office 1 January 2003 – 1 January 2011
- President: Luiz Inácio Lula da Silva
- Preceded by: Marco Maciel
- Succeeded by: Michel Temer

Minister of Defence
- In office 8 November 2004 – 31 March 2006
- President: Luiz Inácio Lula da Silva
- Preceded by: José Viegas Filho
- Succeeded by: Waldir Pires

Senator for Minas Gerais
- In office 1 February 1999 – 1 January 2003
- Preceded by: Júnia Marise
- Succeeded by: Aelton Freitas
Further offices held
1995–1998	Vice President, National Confederation of Industry
1989–1995	President, Federation of Industries of the State of Minas Gerais
1973–1973	Director, Commercial Association of Minas Gerais
1965–1966	Director, Commercial Association of Ubá

Personal details
- Born: José Alencar Gomes da Silva; 17 October 1931 Muriaé, Minas Gerais, Brazil
- Died: 29 March 2011 (aged 79) São Paulo, São Paulo, Brazil
- Party: PMDB (1993–2002); PL (2002–2005); PRB (2005–2011)
- Spouse: Mariza Gomes (m. 1957)
- Children: 4
- Occupation: Businessman; entrepreneur; politician

José Alencar Gomes da Silva (Portuguese pronunciation: [ʒuˈzɛ alẽˈkaʁ ˈɡõmiz dɐ ˈsiwvɐ]; 17 October 1931 – 29 March 2011) was a Brazilian businessman, entrepreneur and politician who served as the 23rd vice president of Brazil from 1 January 2003 to 1 January 2011. In business from a young age, Alencar became a self-made multimillionaire as the chief executive of Coteminas, a leading textile manufacturer. In the 1990s, Alencar groomed his son to succeed him at the company.

He opted to enter politics in his home state, Minas Gerais. Alencar had a business-oriented political platform, advocating market liberalization and deregulation of production. His expensive political campaigns received hefty funds from Coteminas. After a failed run in 1994 for governor of Minas Gerais, he won the election in 1998 as Senator representing his home state.

In 2002, Alencar was invited by the left-wing Workers' Party to run for vice president on the same ticket as Luiz Inácio Lula da Silva. The alliance between the leftist union leader and Alencar, an experienced entrepreneur, proved successful. They won the 2002 Brazilian general election and were re-elected in 2006. Over the years, Lula da Silva and Alencar developed a close and affectionate friendship. Diagnosed with cancer of the stomach and kidney in 1997, Alencar died of the disease in 2011.

Alencar came to be revered among journalists and politicians for his spirited personality and friendly demeanor. He overcame his lack of formal education. Based on his business success, he argued in favor of lower taxes, especially indirect taxation over consumers, and a simpler tax system; lower interest rates and greater oversight of the banking industry; and social welfare and assistance programs. As Vice President, Alencar sometimes spoke out against his own government's orthodox policies, causing embarrassment for fellow administration members. His unwavering determination to live in the face of terminal cancer also marked public perception, during and after his time in office.

== Biography ==
Alencar was born into a family of small entrepreneurs from Muriaé, in the inland state of Minas Gerais on 17 October 1931. He was the eleventh son of Antônio Gomes da Silva and Dolores Peres Gomes da Silva. As a child, he was a Boy Scout.

He started working while still a child, dropping out of primary school to help his father in the family business. He worked with his older brothers for years before becoming an independent successful businessman. For a time he worked as a travelling salesman and in food wholesale start-ups.

Alencar eventually turned his family's small clothes factory and retail store into a major business. In 1967, he founded Coteminas, which he would lead to become one of Brazil's largest textile manufacturers. He produced goods for traditional brands in its portfolio, such as Artex, Santista and Calfat. He vied for dominance of the global market after a merger with South Carolina-based Springs Industries.

=== Political career ===
After decades as a businessman, Alencar decided to enter politics and prepared his son to take over his leadership of Coteminas. He ran for governor of Minas Gerais in 1994. Although he was not successful, in 1998 he was elected as Senator from Minas Gerais. While in the Senate, Alencar worked on several Commissions, including the Senatorial Commission for Economic and Social Matters.

In 2002, he left the presidency of his company, by then a leading player with roughly 850 million reais in yearly net sales, to his son Josué Gomes da Silva. Alencar ran for Vice President of Brazil, tapped to be Lula's running mate, to assuage worries about the candidate's alleged anti-business bias. He became the honorary President of the center-right Liberal Party.

At the end of 2005, Alencar left his party to associate with the new Brazilian Republican Party, whose founders included Bishop Marcelo Crivella of the Universal Church of the Kingdom of God, a large and growing evangelical church in Brazil and other countries. Crivella is also a Senator representing Rio de Janeiro in the federal government.

==== Vice Presidency (2003–2011) ====
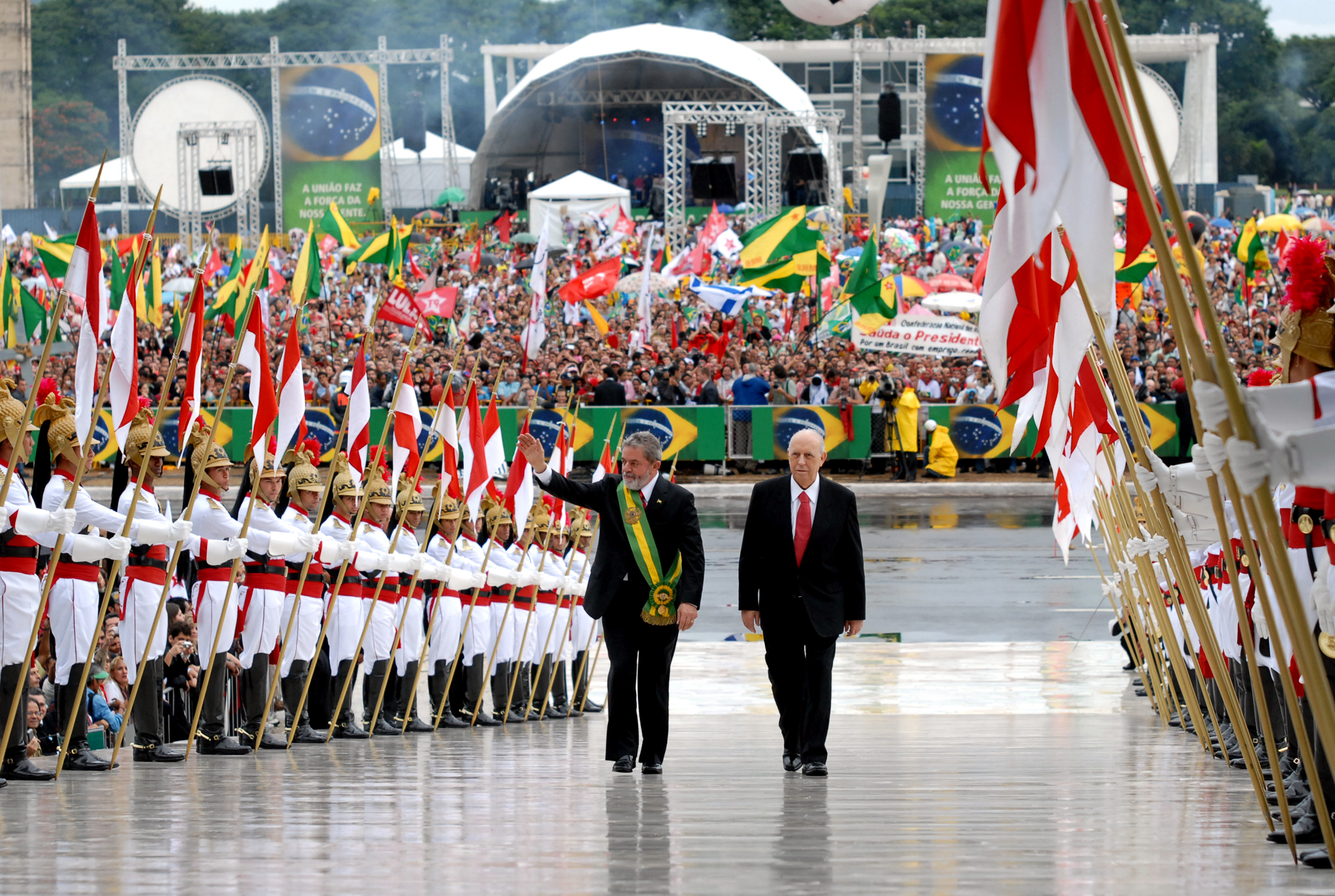
President Luiz Inácio Lula da Silva and Vice President Alencar in their second inauguration ceremony, walking into Palácio do Planalto, on 1 January 2007

In office, Alencar aligned with another successful businessman in the cabinet, Luiz Fernando Furlan, to channel the demands of Brazilian businessmen. They voiced discontent with bureaucracy, insufficient infrastructure and cautious monetary policy. His efforts led to the strengthening of Apex-Brasil, a pro-export agency seen as instrumental in the Brazilian economy's recent rise in exports.

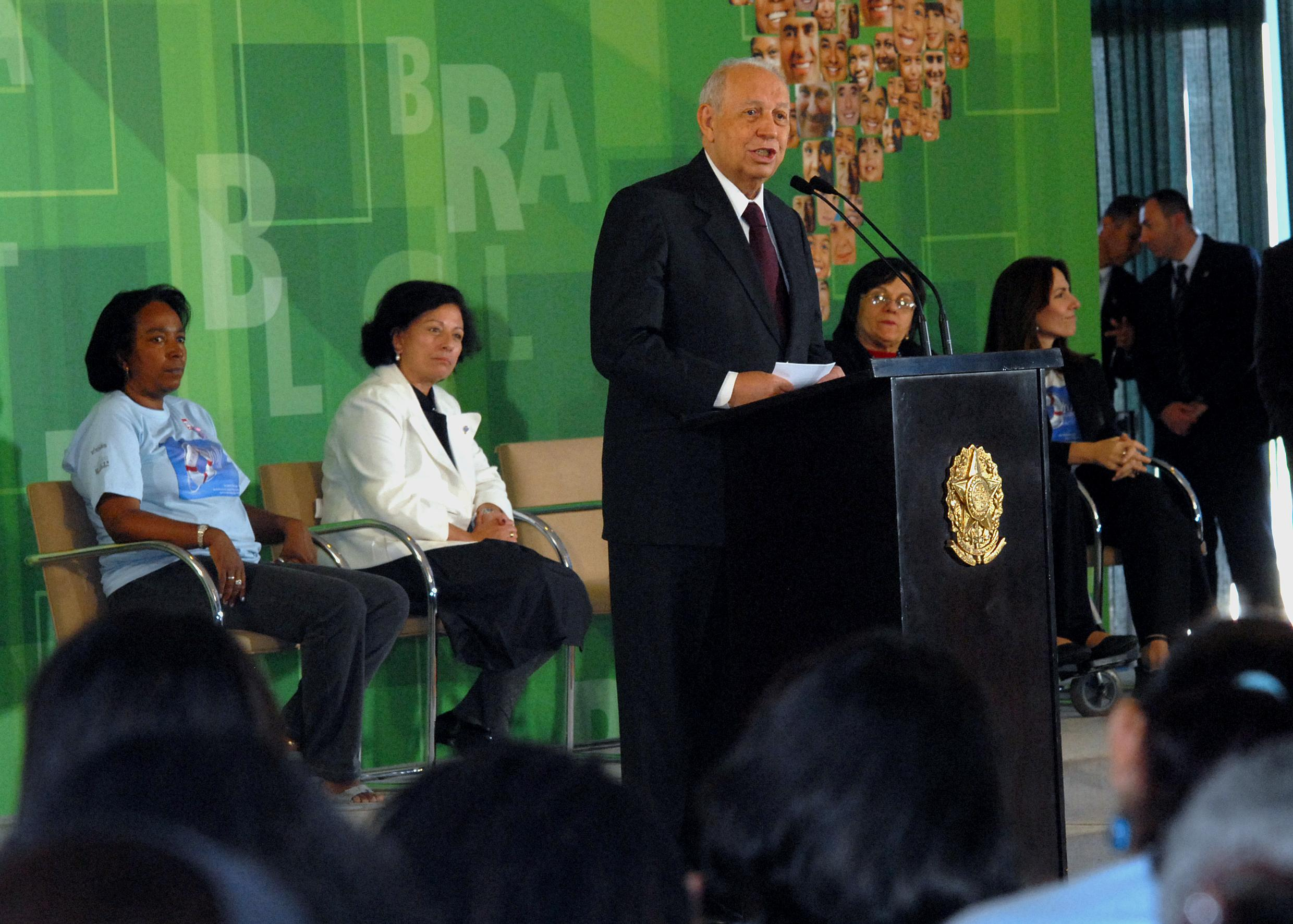
Alencar giving a speech on women's rights in the Palácio do Planalto, 7 August 2008

Alencar was the most notable person in government to openly complain of the conservative monetary policies of the Brazilian Central Bank, under Henrique Meirelles, backed by ministers Antonio Palocci and Paulo Bernardo. He often criticized his own administration for failing to lower the Central Bank's base interest rates and demanded a reform of the country's tax system.

In November 2004 he was sworn in as Defense Minister, following the resignation of José Viegas Filho. Lula turned to him to occupy the position. Alencar tried to resign on several occasions, claiming that a businessman would hardly be the best choice for running a nation's military forces. President Lula convinced him to stay until March 2006, when Alencar resigned his ministerial post, in favor of anti-graft activist Waldir Pires.

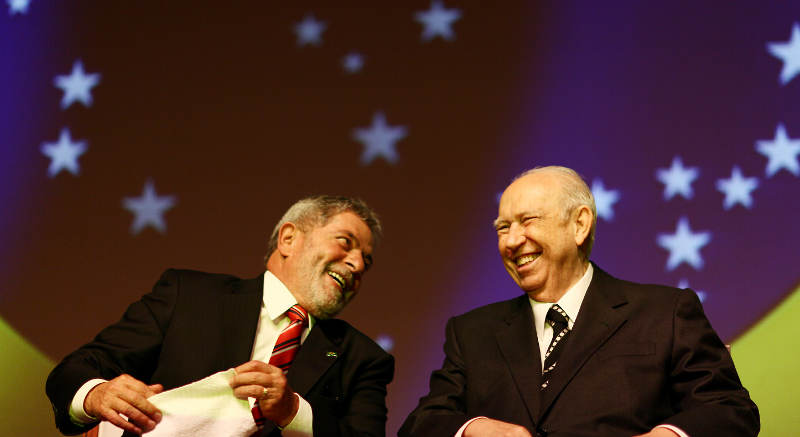
Alencar (right) with President Lula da Silva

Despite his disagreements with some policies of the Lula administration, Alencar was officially invited by Lula to be his running mate in the 2006 general elections. With Lula's re-election victory on 29 October, Alencar secured his position as vice president for another term. Alencar adopted a lower tone, while still espousing his traditional positions. He sought to run for the Senate in 2010, but was forced to give up due to the advanced stage of his cancer disease.

== Personal life ==
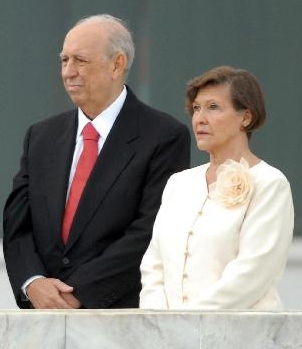
Alencar with his wife Mariza at the Palácio do Planalto in 2007

After getting established, Alencar married Mariza Gomes in 1957. They had three children together. Their two daughters are Maria da Graça and Patrícia. Their son Josué took over the presidency of Coteminas after his father went into politics.

As a result of a case filed by Rosemary de Morais, a 55-year-old retired teacher, in July 2010 the court ruled that Alencar needed to recognize her as his daughter. He had refused to undergo DNA testing but, according to Brazilian law 12.004/2009, this refusal is accepted as evidence of paternity. In addition, the judge ruled that other evidence in the case led him to his decision. Rosemary de Morais said she was the child of Francisca de Morais, a nurse, and Alencar, from a relationship they had in 1954, before either was married. In 2015, the Superior Court of Justice recognized Rosemary as Alencar's daughter.

== Disease and death ==
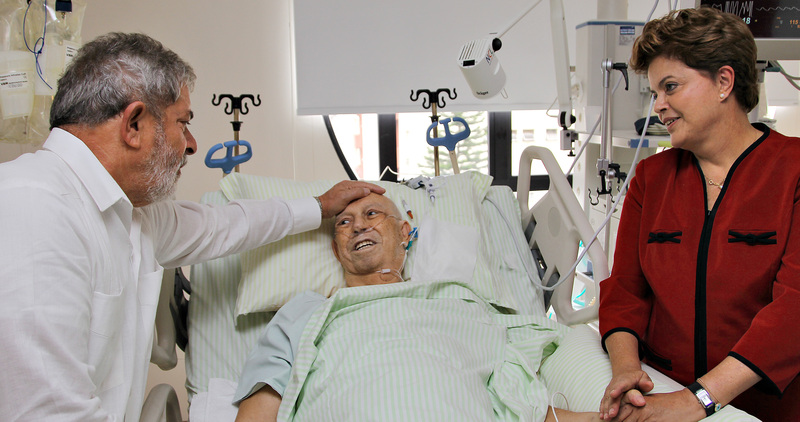
Alencar, visited by President Lula da Silva and President-elect Dilma Rousseff, receiving anticancer treatment at Sírio-Libanês Hospital in São Paulo, 23 December 2010

On a routine check-up, José Alencar was diagnosed with stomach and kidney cancer in 1997. After undergoing treatment for some length of time, he had his right kidney and two-thirds of his stomach surgically removed. Five years later, a malignant tumor in his prostate was removed. As the disease had metastasized, it continued to spread, and in 2006 doctors discovered a sarcoma in his abdomen. On 26 January 2009, a surgery extirpated eight tumors, along with compromised portions of his small and large intestines and the ureters. He was treated for digestive hemorrhage in December 2010 with urgent surgery, his last as vice president. Doctors could not remove the tumors in his abdomen because of the number of operations to which he had already been subjected – eighteen in all. Alencar received chemotherapy for many years. He was mostly treated at Hospital Sírio-Libanês, in São Paulo. He also received experimental treatment at the M.D. Anderson Cancer Center in Houston, Texas.

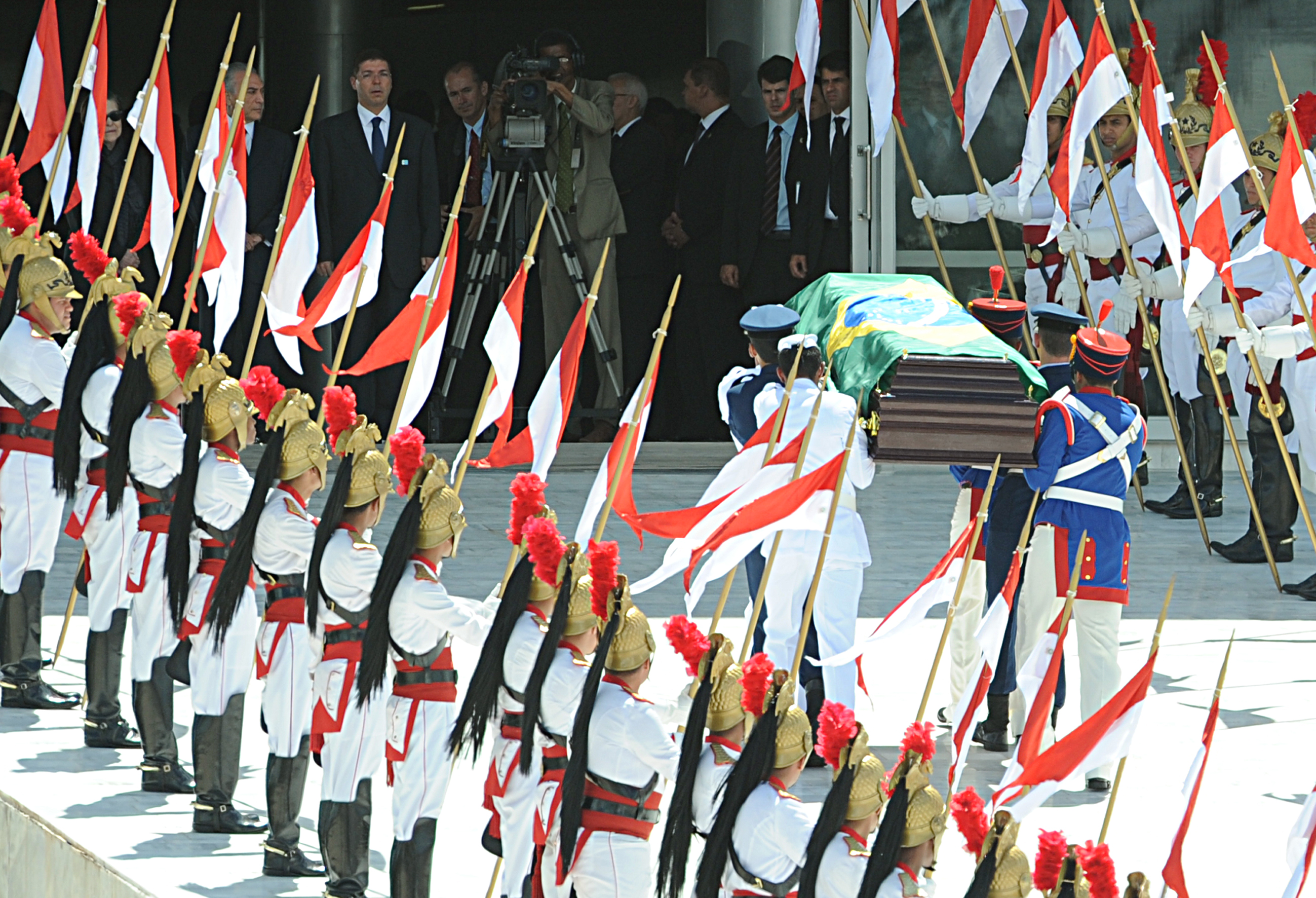
An honor guard carrying the casket of José Alencar up the ramp of the Palácio do Planalto during his state funeral, 30 March 2011

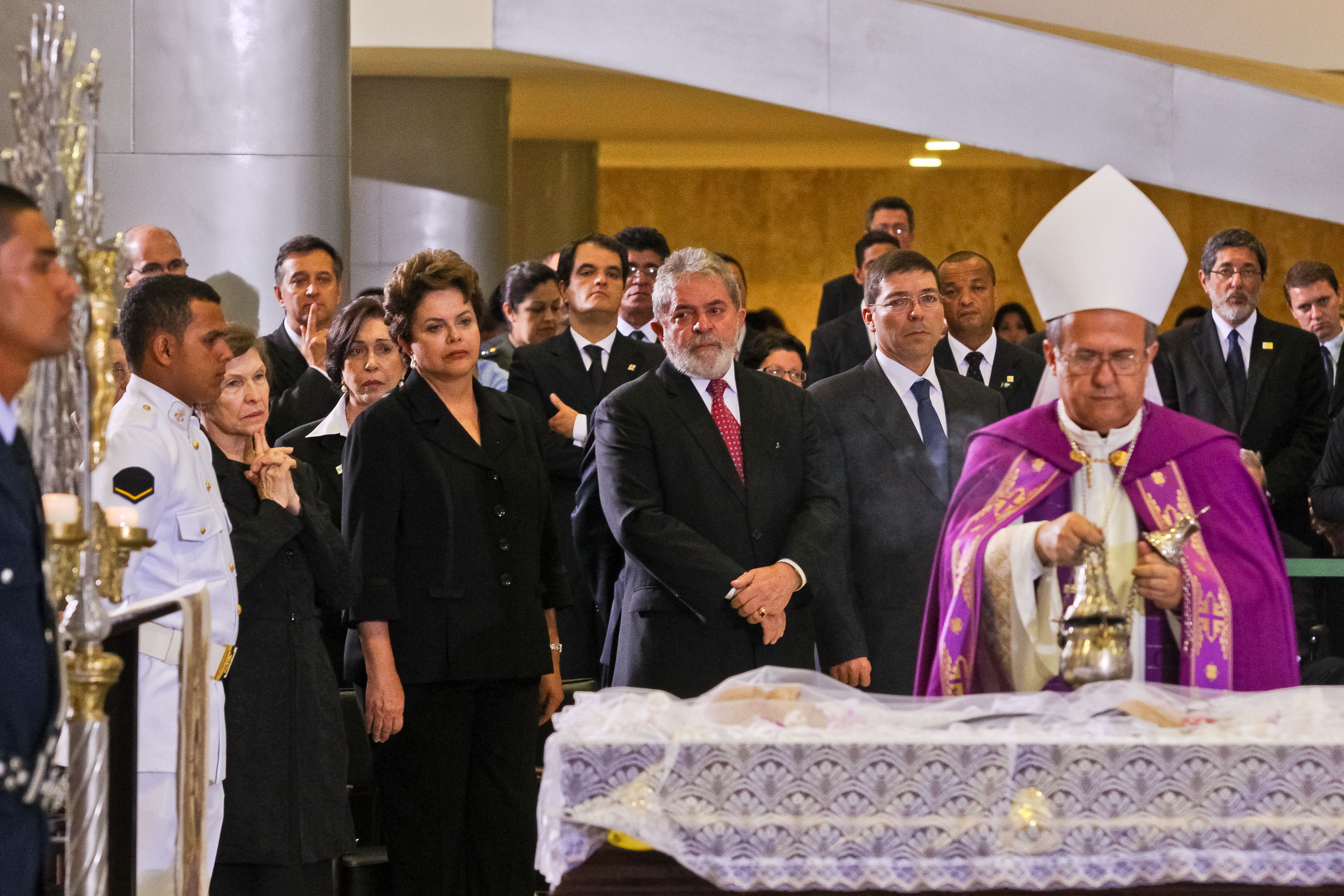
Alencar lying in state, with his widow, Mariza, his son, Josué, President Rousseff, former President Lula da Silva, and others in attendance

Alencar died in late March 2011, in the city of São Paulo, after 13 years battling metastasized cancer. His death was met with expressions of grief and respect by members of different institutions and across the political spectrum – former President Lula said he knew "few men with José Alencar's goodness and spirit" and President Rousseff said it was an "honor" to have served alongside him. Brazil held a state funeral for José Alencar, and Vice President Michel Temer decreed seven days of official mourning. Alencar is remembered as an honest and independent politician who favored social welfare and economic freedom.

Political offices
Preceded by Marco Maciel	Vice President of Brazil; 2003–2011	Succeeded by Michel Temer
Preceded by José Viegas Filho	Minister of Defence; 2004–2006	Succeeded by Waldir Pires
