= Cacimba de Dentro =

Coordinates: 06°38′31″S 35°47′24″W

- Municipality
- The Municipality of Cacimba de Dentro
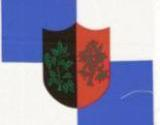
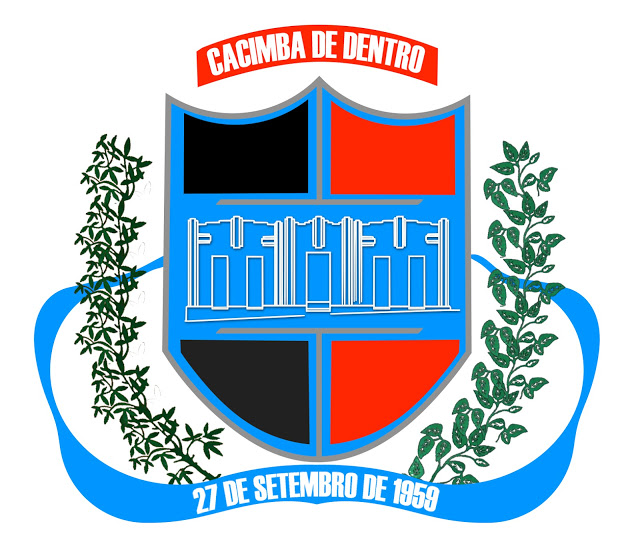
- Flag Coat of arms

- Location of Cacimba de Dentro in the State of Paraíba
- Country: Brazil
- Region: Northeast
- State: Paraíba
- Founded: December 27, 1949

Government
  - Mayor Nelinho Costa: Nelinho Costa (Cidadania)

Population (2020)
  - Total: 17,178
- Time zone: UTC−3 (BRT)
- HDI (2000): 0.548 – medium

Cacimba de Dentro (Central northeastern portuguese pronunciation: [kɐˈsĩbɐ di ˈdẽtu]) is a municipality in the state of Paraíba in northeastern Brazil. It is located in the mesoregion of Agreste Paraibano and the microregion of Western Curimataú, 160 km from the state capital, João Pessoa.
