= Alex Manente =

Brazilian politician (born 1979)

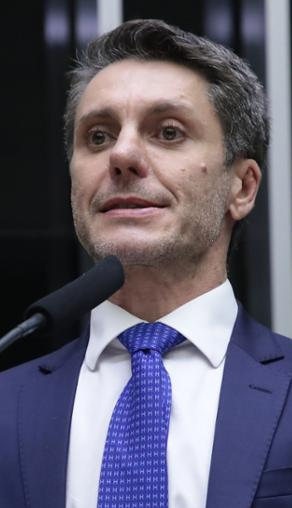
- Manente in 2024

Member of the Chamber of Deputies
- Incumbent
- Assumed office 1 February 2015
- Constituency: São Paulo

Personal details
- Born: 22 August 1979 (age 46)
- Party: Cidadania (since 2019)

Alex Spinelli Manente (born 22 August 1979) is a Brazilian politician serving as a member of the Chamber of Deputies since 2015. From 2007 to 2015, he was a member of the Legislative Assembly of São Paulo.
