= José Viegas Filho =

Brazilian diplomat

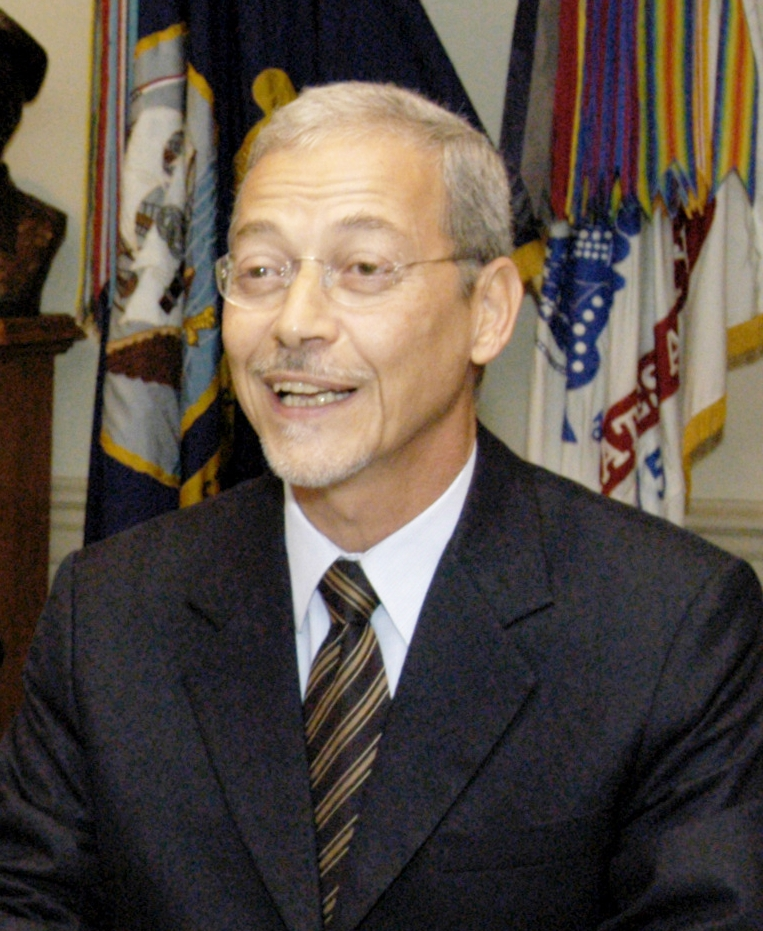

Minister of Defence of Brazil
- In office January 1, 2003 – November 8, 2004
- President: Luiz Inácio Lula da Silva
- Preceded by: Geraldo Magela
- Succeeded by: José Alencar

Personal details
- Born: 14 October 1942 (age 84) Rio de Janeiro, Brazil
- Profession: Diplomat

José Viegas Filho (born 14 October 1942 in Rio de Janeiro) is a Brazilian diplomat.

José Viegas served as Brazilian Ambassador to Denmark (1995–1998), to Peru (1998–2001) and to Russia (2001–2002). He was Minister of Defence in the Presidency of Luiz Inácio Lula da Silva in 2003 and 2004. He tendered in his resignation to the President of the Republic due to a crisis generated by a note released by the Social Communication Service of the Brazilian Army which defended the Military Régime.

In his note of resignation to the Ministerial office, José Viegas mentioned the incompatibility between the authoritarian philosophy based on the Doctrine of National Security and the full validity of the democratic institutions:

"The note released on Sunday 17 represents the persistency of an authoritarian philosophy, linked to the remains of the old and anachronistic doctrine of national security, incompatible with the full validity of democracy and with the development of Brazil in the 21st century. It is high time for the representatives of this dated philosophy to walk out of the scene."

In 2005, José Viegas Filho resumed his diplomatic career as Brazilian Ambassador to Spain and in 2009 became Brazilian Ambassador in Italy, which he held until 2012.

He attended the Instituto Rio Branco. He is married to Ericka Stockholm, a Peruvian writer of children tales. She was a famous actress in Peru in the decade of 80's and 90's.

Political offices
Preceded by Geraldo Magela	Minister of Defence of Brazil; 2003–2004	Succeeded by José Alencar
