= Celso Amorim =

Brazilian diplomat (born 1942)

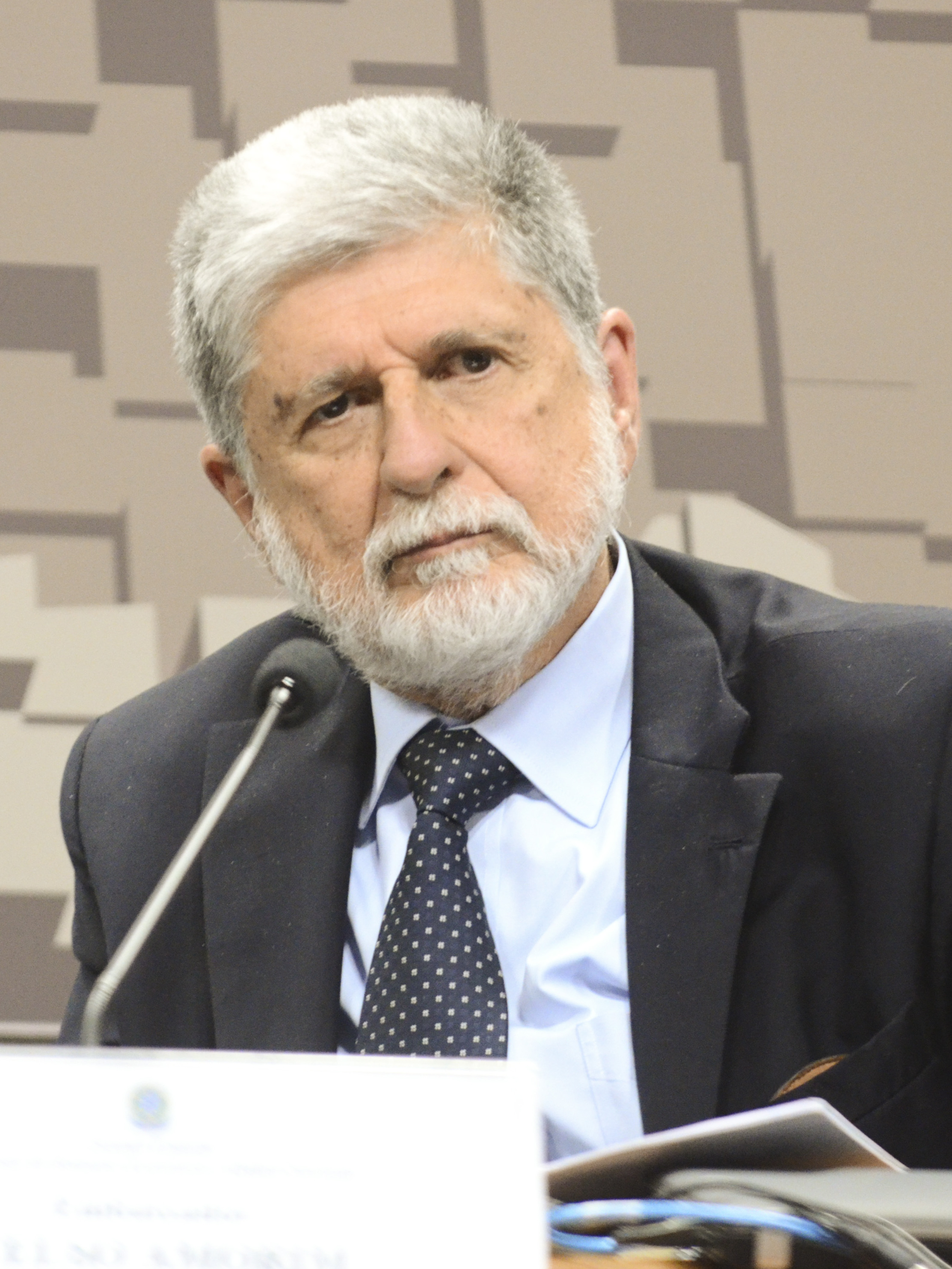
- Amorim in 2017

Chief Advisor to the President of Brazil for Foreign Policy
- Incumbent
- Assumed office 5 January 2023
- President: Luiz Inácio Lula da Silva

Minister of Defence
- In office 5 August 2011 – 1 January 2015
- President: Dilma Rousseff
- Preceded by: Nelson Jobim
- Succeeded by: Jaques Wagner

Minister of Foreign Affairs
- In office 1 January 2003 – 1 January 2011
- President: Luiz Inácio Lula da Silva
- Preceded by: Celso Lafer
- Succeeded by: Antonio Patriota
- In office 20 July 1993 – 1 January 1995
- President: Itamar Franco
- Preceded by: Fernando Henrique Cardoso
- Succeeded by: Luiz Felipe Lampreia

Ambassador of Brazil to the United Kingdom
- In office 16 December 2001 – 27 December 2002
- Nominated by: Fernando Henrique Cardoso
- Preceded by: Sérgio Amaral
- Succeeded by: José Bustani

Secretary General of Foreign Affairs
- In office 23 June 1993 – 1 September 1993
- President: Itamar Franco
- Preceded by: Luiz Felipe Lampreia
- Succeeded by: Roberto Abdenur

Personal details
- Born: Celso Luiz Nunes Amorim; 3 June 1942 (age 84) Santos, São Paulo, Brazil
- Party: Workers' Party (since 2009)
- Other political affiliations: PMDB (1980–2009)
- Spouse: Ana Maria Amorim
- Children: 4
- Education: Rio Branco Institute; Diplomatic Academy of Vienna
- Profession: Diplomat; politician
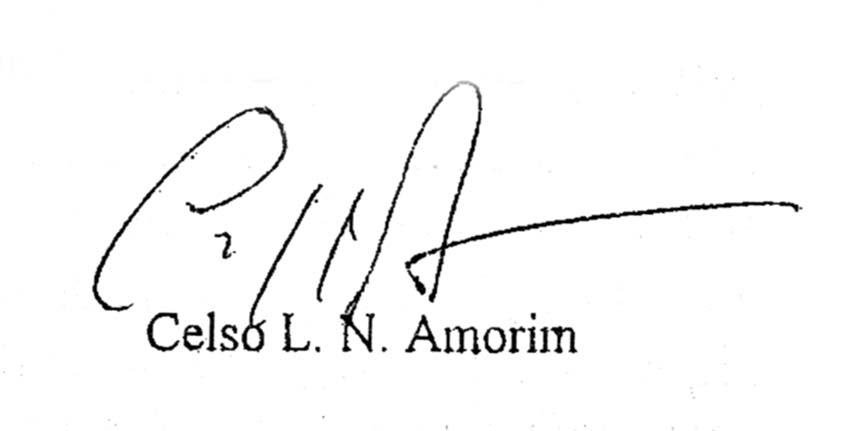
- Signature

Celso Luiz Nunes Amorim (born 3 June 1942) is a Brazilian diplomat who served as Minister of Foreign Affairs from 1993 to 1994 under President Itamar Franco and again from 2003 to 2010 under President Luiz Inácio Lula da Silva. He also served as Minister of Defence from 2011 to 2014 under President Dilma Rousseff.

Before his appointment as Minister of Foreign Affairs by Lula, Amorim served as Brazil's ambassador to the United Kingdom. On 7 October 2009, Amorim was named the "world's best foreign minister" by Foreign Policy magazine blogger David Rothkopf. On 5 January 2023, Amorim was appointed as Chief Advisor to the President for Foreign Policy during Lula's second presidency.

== Early life and academic career ==
Amorim was born in Santos, São Paulo, on June 3, 1942.

He graduated from the Rio Branco Institute, a graduate school of international relations run by the Ministry of External Relations, in 1965, and obtained a post-graduate degree in International Relations from the Diplomatic Academy of Vienna in 1967.

Amorim was a professor of Portuguese language at the Rio Branco Institute, as well as professor of political science and international relations at the University of Brasília. He is a permanent member of the Foreign Affairs Department of the University of São Paulo Institute of Advanced Studies.

== Governmental career ==
Amorim has a long history of government service, beginning in 1987 when he was appointed Secretary for International Affairs for the Ministry of Science and Technology. He served in that position until 1989, when he was selected to be the Director-General for Cultural Affairs in the Ministry of External Relations. Amorim was shifted again in 1990, moving to a new post as Director-General for Economic Affairs. In 1993, he was promoted to the position of Secretary General of the Brazilian foreign-affairs agency.

While serving in the Ministry of External Relations, Amorim spent large amounts of time working as an ambassador to the United Nations. Most notably, he represented Brazil on the Kosovo–Yugoslavia sanctions committee in 1998, and the Security Council panel on Iraq in 1999. Amorim was named as Brazil's permanent ambassador to the United Nations and the WTO later that year, and served for two years before becoming ambassador to the United Kingdom in 2001.

He became Foreign Affairs Minister between January 2003 and December 2010. On 22 July 2005, Amorim was the subject that the 27-year old Brazilian electrician Jean Charles de Menezes was shot dead by police onboard a tube in Stockwell tube station, a day after the failed 21 July 2005 London bombings.

=== WTO controversy ===
On July 19, 2008, Amorim stirred up controversy by comparing the descriptions used by wealthier countries to characterize the agricultural concessions they were offering during the Doha Round of WTO talks to the work of Nazi propagandist Joseph Goebbels. This brought a swift condemnation from the U.S. State Department.

== Later career ==
Celso serves on the Commission on Global Security, Justice & Governance, chaired by Madeleine Albright and Ibrahim Gambari. In November 2016, he was appointed by United Nations Secretary-General Ban Ki-moon to the High-Level Panel on Access to Medicines, co-chaired by Ruth Dreifuss, former President of Switzerland, and Festus Mogae, former President of Botswana.

In addition, Celso holds a number of honorary positions, including the following:

- Unitaid, Chair of the Executive Board (since 2017)
- Center for International Relations and Sustainable Development (CIRSD), Member of the Board of Advisors

In 2019, Amorim joined the inaugural meeting of the Puebla Group in Buenos Aires, a conference of left-leaning political leaders.

In 2026, Amorin was awarded Doutor Honoris Causa by the Universidade Federal do ABC.

== Personal life ==
Amorim is married to Ana Maria Amorim and has four children: Vicente, Anita, João, and Pedro.

Political offices
Preceded by Fernando Henrique Cardoso	Minister of Foreign Affairs; 1993–94; 2003–10	Succeeded by Luiz Felipe Lampreia
Preceded by Celso Lafer	Minister of Foreign Affairs; 1993–94; 2003–10	Succeeded by Antonio Patriota
Preceded by Nelson Jobim	Minister of Defence; 2011–15	Succeeded by Jaques Wagner
New office	Chief Advisor to the President of Brazil for Foreign Policy; 2023–present	Incumbent
