= Taquaraçu de Minas =

Human settlement in Brazil

Coordinates: 19°40′12″S 43°41′13″W

- Municipality
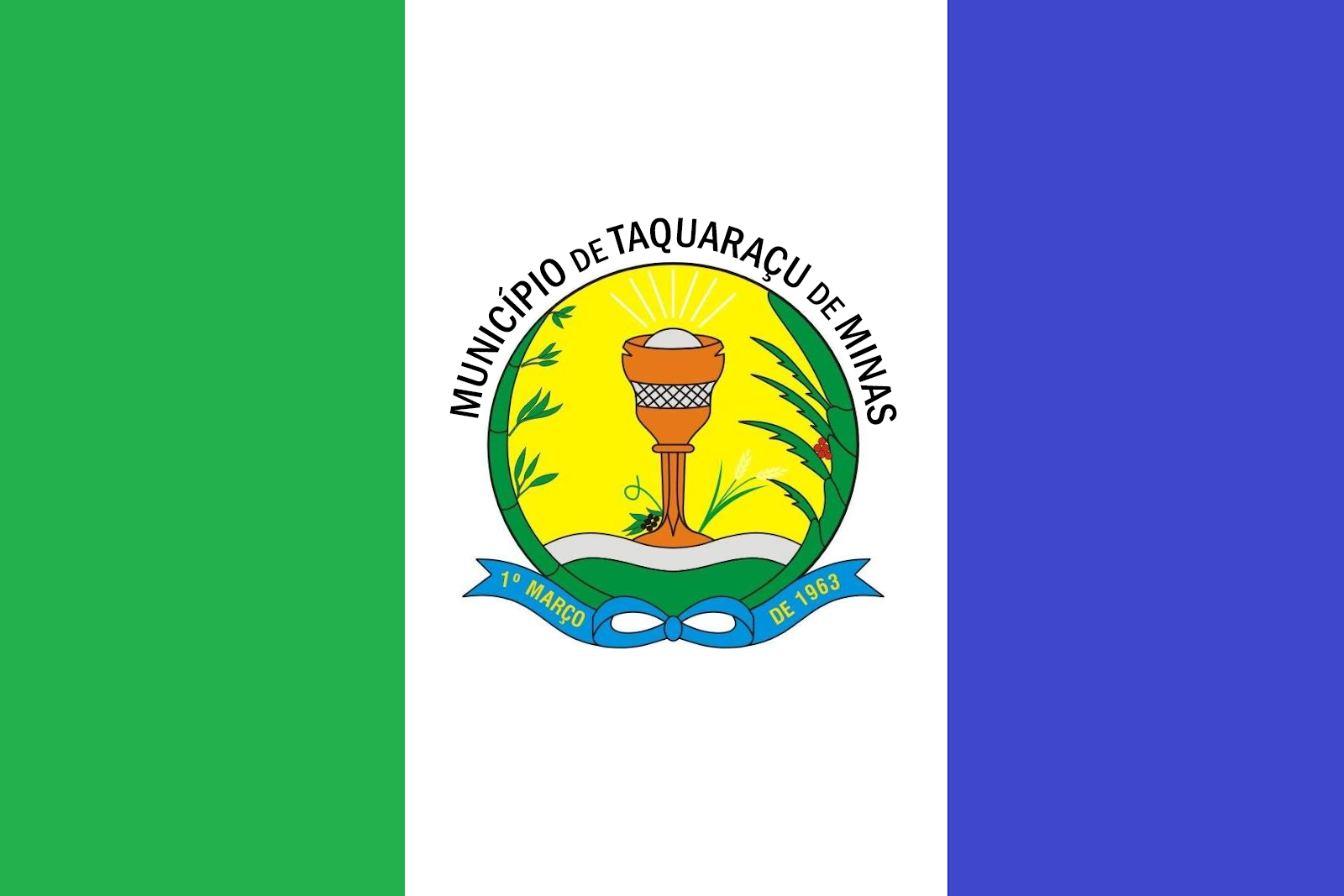
- Flag
- Interactive map of Taquaraçu de Minas
- Country: Brazil
- State: Minas Gerais
- Region: Southeast

Population (2022 Census)
  - Total: 4,224
  - Estimate (2025): 4,394
- Time zone: UTC−3 (BRT)

Location of Taquaraçu de Minas within Minas Gerais

Taquaraçu de Minas is a Brazilian municipality located in the state of Minas Gerais. The city belongs to the mesoregion Metropolitana de Belo Horizonte and to the microregion of Itabira. As of 2025, the estimated population was 4,394.

== See also ==
- List of municipalities in Minas Gerais
