= Francisco Weffort =

Brazilian political scientist (1937–2021)

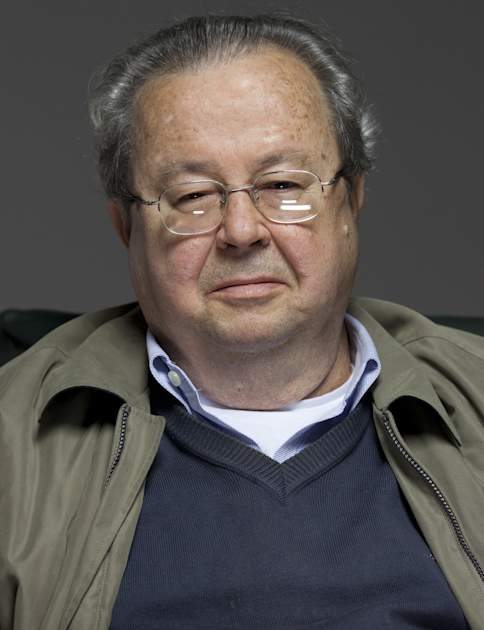

Minister of Culture
- In office 1995–2002
- President: Fernando Henrique Cardoso
- Preceded by: Luiz Roberto Nascimento Silva
- Succeeded by: Gilberto Gil

Personal details
- Born: Francisco Correia Weffort; 17 May 1937 Quatá, São Paulo, Brazil
- Died: 1 August 2021 (aged 84) Rio de Janeiro, Rio de Janeiro, Brazil
- Party: Workers' Party
- Spouse: Helena Severo
- Education: University of São Paulo
- Occupation: Political scientist, politician, academic
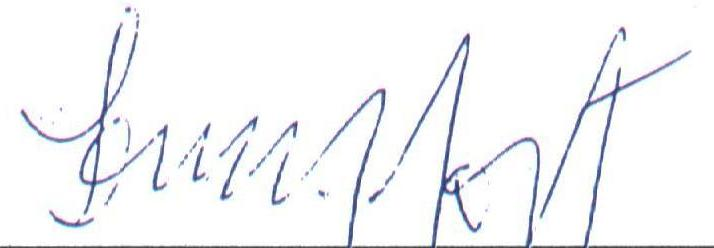
- Signature

Francisco Correia Weffort (17 May 1937 – 1 August 2021) was a Brazilian political scientist, academic and politician who served as the Minister of Culture from 1995 until 2002. He was a member of the Workers' Party. He was also a professor at the University of São Paulo.

Weffort was born in 1937 in Quatá, São Paulo. He was educated at the University of São Paulo. Weffort was married to Helena Severo and had four children.

Weffort died on 1 August 2021, at a hospital in Rio de Janeiro, aged 84. He had undergone heart surgery at the time of his death.
