= Celso Lafer =

Brazilian politician (born 1941)

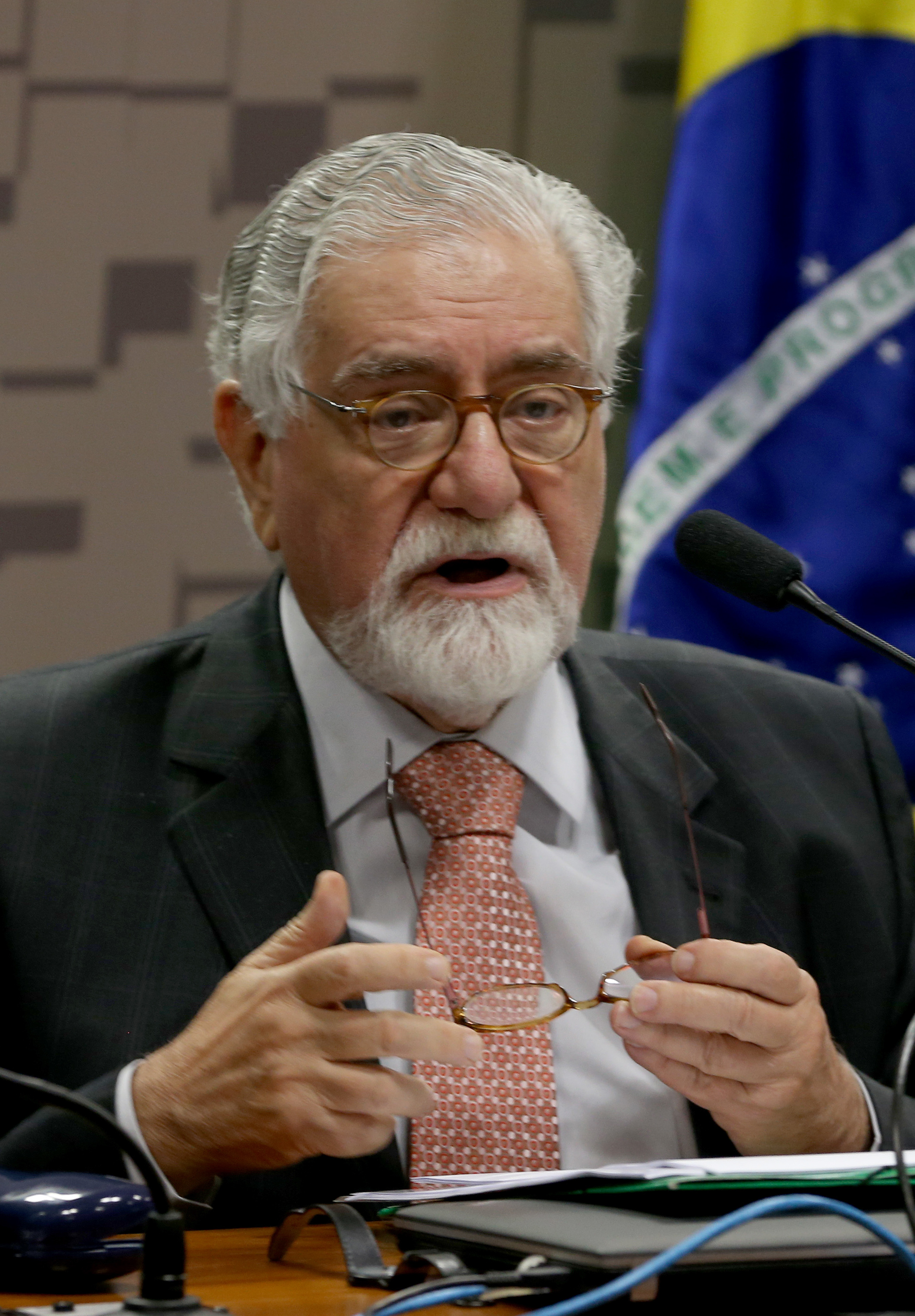

Minister of Foreign Affairs
- In office January 29, 2001 – December 31, 2002
- President: Fernando Henrique Cardoso
- Preceded by: Luiz Felipe Lampreia
- Succeeded by: Celso Amorim
- In office April 13, 1992 – October 2, 1992
- President: Fernando Collor de Mello
- Preceded by: Francisco Rezek
- Succeeded by: Fernando Henrique Cardoso

Minister of Development, Industry and Commerce
- In office January 1, 1999 – July 18, 1999
- President: Fernando Henrique Cardoso
- Preceded by: José Botafogo Gonçalves as Minister of Development, Industry and Tourism
- Succeeded by: Clóvis de Barros Carvalho as Minister of Development, Industry and Trade

5th Academic of the 14th chair of the Brazilian Academy of Letters
- Incumbent
- Assumed office December 1, 2006
- Preceded by: Miguel Reale

Personal details
- Born: August 7, 1941 (age 84)
- Profession: Diplomat, Jurist

Celso Lafer (born August 7, 1941) is a Brazilian jurist, full professor of Philosophy of Law at University of São Paulo, twice former foreign minister and a former commerce minister. He is of Lithuanian Jewish heritage.

== Education ==
Lafer has a Bachelor in Law from University of São Paulo, a Master's and a Ph.D. in Political Science from Cornell University and a habilitation in Public International Law from University of São Paulo.

== Work ==
Lafer worked for the administrations of Fernando Collor de Mello as Foreign Minister and for Fernando Henrique Cardoso as Foreign Minister and Commerce Minister. He is a member of the Brazilian Academy of Sciences since 2004. He is a member of the Brazilian Academy of Letters since 2006, occupying the chair that belonged to Miguel Reale, Professor of Philosophy of Law at University of São Paulo, and President of the São Paulo Research Foundation (FAPESP), one of the main funding agencies for scientific and technological research in Brazil.
