= Geraldo Magela =

Brazilian politician (1935–2024)

Geraldo Quintão
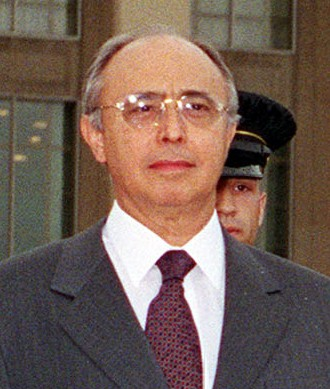

Minister of Defense
- In office 24 January 2000 – 1 January 2003
- President: Fernando Henrique Cardoso
- Preceded by: Élcio Álvares
- Succeeded by: José Viegas Filho

Attorney General of the Union
- In office 6 July 1993 – 24 January 2000
- President: Itamar Franco; Fernando Henrique Cardoso
- Preceded by: Tarcísio de Almeida Cunha
- Succeeded by: Gilmar Mendes

Personal details
- Born: Geraldo Magela da Cruz Quintão; 1 July 1935; Taquaraçu de Minas, Minas Gerais, Brazil
- Died: 27 December 2024 (aged 89)
- Profession: Attorney
- Awards: Order of Military Merit (Grand Cross - Grã-Cruz)

Geraldo Magela da Cruz Quintão (1 July 1935 – 27 December 2024) was a Brazilian politician. Magela also served as the Brazilian Minister of Defence from 2000 to 2002. Magela died on 27 December 2024, at the age of 89.

Political offices
Preceded by Tarcísio de Almeida Cunha	Attorney General of the Union; 1993–2000	Succeeded by Gilmar Mendes
Preceded by Élcio Álvares	Minister of Defence; 2000–2002	Succeeded by José Viegas Filho
