= Democrats (Brazil) =

Former political party in Brazil

Democrats Democratas
- Abbreviation: DEM
- President: Antônio Carlos Magalhães Neto
- Founded: January 24, 1985 (PFL); March 28, 2007 (DEM)
- Dissolved: February 8, 2022
- Split from: Democratic Social Party
- Merged into: Brazil Union
- Headquarters: Senado Federal – Anexo I – 26º Andar, Sala 2602 – Brasília – DF
- Youth wing: Juventude Democratas
- Ideology: Liberal conservatism Economic liberalism Classical liberalism Christian democracy
- Political position: Centre-right
- International affiliation: Centrist Democrat International; International Democrat Union (formerly)
- Regional affiliation: Union of Latin American Parties; Christian Democrat Organization of America
- Colors: Blue, green, white
- Slogan: The Force of New Ideas
- TSE Identification Number: 25

The Democrats (Portuguese: Democratas, DEM) was a centre-right political party in Brazil that merged with the Social Liberal Party to found the Brazil Union in 2021. It was founded in 1985 under the name of Liberal Front Party (Partido da Frente Liberal, PFL) from a dissidence of the defunct Democratic Social Party (PDS), successor to the National Renewal Alliance (ARENA), the official party during the military dictatorship of 1964–1985. It changed to its current name in 2007. The original name reflected the party's support of free market policies, rather than the identification with international liberal parties. Instead, the party affiliated itself to the international federations of Christian-democratic (CDI) and conservative parties (IDU). The Democrats' identification number is 25 and its colors are green, blue, and white.

In October 2021, the party announced its merger with the Social Liberal Party into the new Brazil Union (Portuguese: União Brasil, UNIÃO) party.

== History ==
=== PFL (1985–2007) ===
1985 logo.

The flag of the party from 1985 until 2005.

On January 24, 1985, DEM's direct predecessor, the Liberal Front Party (Partido da Frente Liberal – PFL), was founded by a dissident faction of the Democratic Social Party (PDS), which had been founded in 1980 as the successor of the National Renewal Alliance (ARENA), the former ruling party during the time of military dictatorship (1965–79). At the time, Brazil was under the effervescence that put an end to the military regime. In the previous year, a series of rallies known as Diretas Já gathered thousands of peoples in the streets of major cities to demand the direct election of the next President, as envisaged in the Dante de Oliveira amendment, which was pending approval in the Congress. On January 10, 1984, PDS rejected supporting this proposition, but a pro-Diretas Já faction emerged within the party a few days later. On April 25, 1984, the Congress, besieged by Army officials, voted the amendment. It did not reach the required quorum for approval, due to the absence of 112 deputies from PDS.

After the attempts to have a direct election failed, discussions about the presidential succession turned to the National Congress, which would elect the President indirectly in the following year. The pro-Diretas Já faction of PDS formed the Liberal Front, and decided to support PMDB's candidate Tancredo Neves against PDS's Paulo Maluf, the official candidate of the military regime. With the support of Aureliano Chaves, Marco Maciel, Antônio Carlos Magalhães, and Jorge Bornhausen, among other major dissidents from PDS, the Liberal Front named José Sarney as Neves' running mate for the 1985 presidential election. On January 15, 1985, the Neves/Sarney presidential ticket got 480 of the 686 votes available in the Congress (70% of the total). Nine days later, on January 24, 1985, the Liberal Front officially disbanded from PDS and formed the Liberal Front Party (PFL). With the death of Tancredo Neves on April 21, 1985, Sarney took office as president. Due to the same electoral law that forbade coalitions, Sarney was forced to join PMDB, of which he is still a member today. PFL, however, was a major ally of his government. His daughter, Roseana, was a member of PFL until 2006, when she was expelled from the party for supporting Luiz Inácio Lula da Silva.

In 1989, Aureliano Chaves was chosen as PFL's presidential candidate, but the weakness of his campaign made most leaders of the party to declare their support for National Reconstruction Party (PRN)'s candidate, Fernando Collor, himself a former member of ARENA, PDS, and PMDB. PFL's senators, however, had masterminded the candidacy of businessman and television presenter Silvio Santos, a maneuver which had been hampered by the Superior Electoral Court. An ally of Collor in the runoff election against Luiz Inácio Lula da Silva, PFL participated in his government, and, even after his impeachment, it participated in the coalition that supported Itamar Franco's government. From 1994 to 1998, PFL supported Fernando Henrique Cardoso and thus secured the post of vice-president with Marco Maciel. Prior to the 2002 election, an operation led by the Federal Police in Maranhão undermined the presidential candidacy of Roseana Sarney, leading to a rupture with the government.

=== Opposition (2002–2016) ===
2005 logo.

In the legislative elections, on October 6, 2002, the party won 84 out of 513 seats in the Chamber of Deputies and 14 out of 54 seats in the Senate. After this election, which saw the rise of Lula of the PT as president, PFL became an opposition party for the first time ever since the 1964 coup. The party reorganized its alliance with Cardoso's PSDB to form the official opposition in the National Congress.

In the following general elections, held on October 1, 2006, the party won 65 seats in the Chamber of Deputies and 6 out of the 27 Senate seats up for election, making it the second largest party in the Senate. The party does not usually run presidential candidates, but does run gubernatorial candidates in several states. In the 2006 elections, the party lost several state governorships, but won the governorship of the Federal District. However, this governorship was later lost due to a corruption scandal in which Governor José Roberto Arruda was caught on tape receiving bribery from private companies.

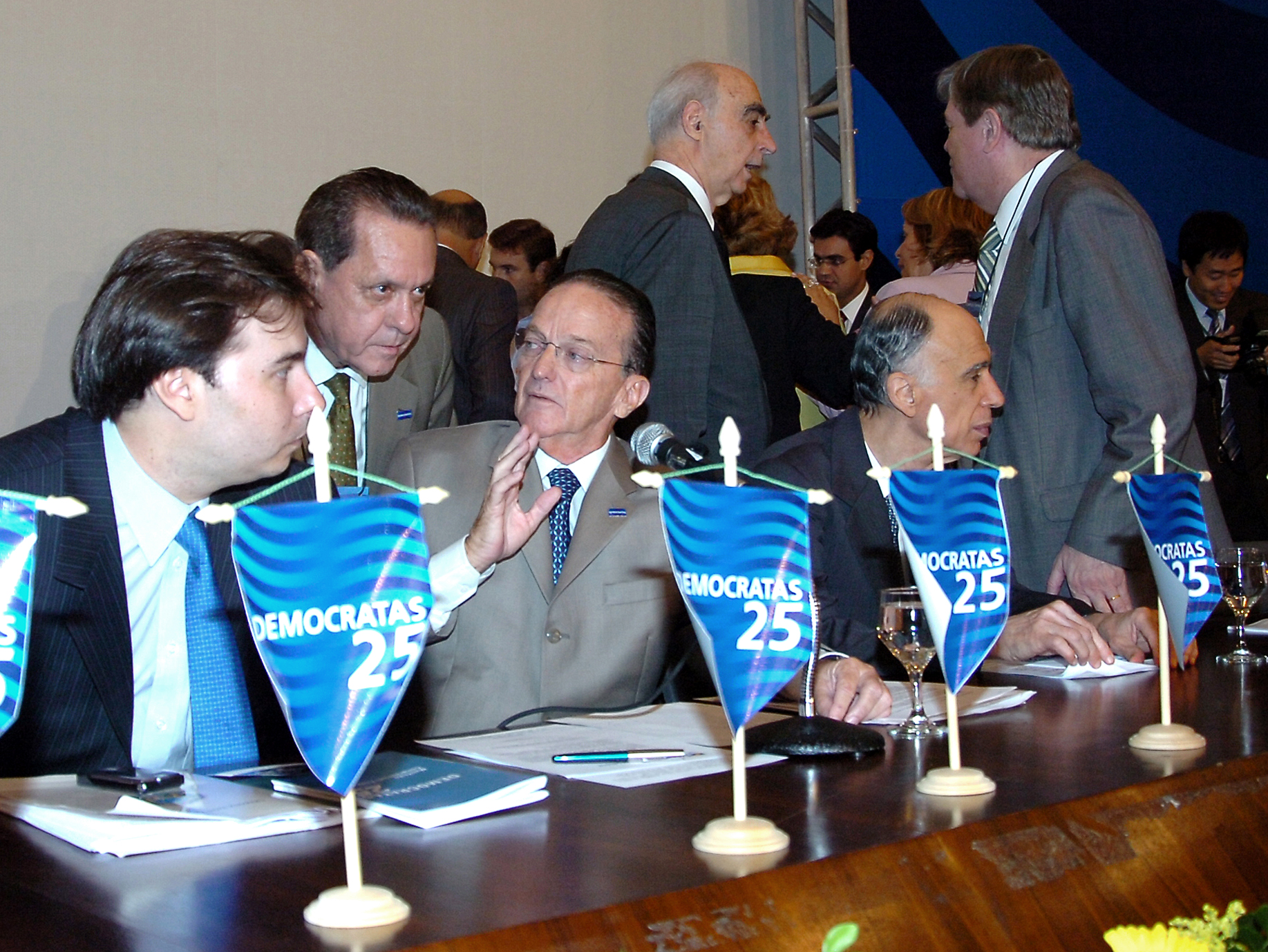
Leaders at the March 27, 2007, convention, during which PFL was refounded as DEM.

Logo adopted with the name change of the party in 2007. This logo was used until 2018.

In 2007, the party rebranded and was renamed Democratas.

In the 2010 elections, the party continued to suffer losses in the Parliament, losing 22 seats in the Chamber of Deputies, and 7 seats in the Senate. DEM was able to elect only two senators that year (Demóstenes Torres from Goiás, and José Agripino Maia from Rio Grande do Norte), for a total of 6, falling from the second largest party in the Senate to the fourth. Its longest-serving member, former Vice President Maciel, who had been first elected to the National Congress in 1966, was not re-elected. On the other hand, DEM won the governorships of the states of Rio Grande do Norte and Santa Catarina, expanding its presence in state administrations.

The party lost over half of its votes when comparing the 2006 and 2010 Senate elections. In 2006, it had 21.6 million votes for the upper house, while in 2010 it had just 10.2 million votes. The decline was less sharp in the Chamber of Deputies elections, as it had 10.1 million votes in 2006, and 7.3 million in 2010. The decrease in DEM's voting was attributed to the rapid growth of the PT and its allies in the Northeast. In 1986, the party had won 36% of the votes for the Chamber in the Northeast, while in 2006 this was reduced to 17%.

As a result of the decline in DEM's popularity, the party has considered merging with another major party, such as the Brazilian Democratic Movement Party (PMDB) or the Brazilian Social Democratic Party (PSDB). A possible merge with PMDB, however, has been rejected by most of DEM's leaders due to the fact that it is a member of the Lulista alliance in the National Congress and in most local level administrations. In 2011, it suffered another decline in its membership when São Paulo mayor Kassab founded the Social Democratic Party (PSD) and took prominent DEM members such as Senator Kátia Abreu, Santa Catarina governor Raimundo Colombo, and former vice-presidential candidate Indio da Costa with him. PSD has 52 federal deputies and 2 senators, most of them former DEM members.

== Ideology ==
The DEM claimed to be an advocate of ethics, democracy, the exercise of human rights, the market economy, and economic liberalism. It presented itself as a center-right party that supported laissez-faire capitalism.

In 2006, the party's former president Jorge Bornhausen stated in an interview with Brazil's largest news magazine Veja, that the party should be considered centrist and socially liberal, with Marcos Costa Lima also describing it as social-liberal. However, other party leaders classified it as "internationally, closest to Christian democracy".

According to political scientist Jairo Nicolau, the name change was intended to crown a process of modernization inside the party. "DEM was launched as a modern right-wing party, with a new program, and aimed at the urban middle classes; a kind of Conservative Party of the UK", he says. This, according to him, explains the departure of founding members and the rise of younger leaders. For instance, Jorge Bornhausen, which had been a member of UDN, retired from the presidency of the party to give place to federal deputy Rodrigo Maia, son of César Maia. The Santa Catarina section of the party was taken over by Bornhausen's own son, deputy Paulo Bornhausen. In Bahia, ACM Neto took over the legacy of his grandfather, Antônio Carlos Magalhães.

Internationally, the Democrats were affiliated with both the Centrist Democrat International and the International Democrat Union.

== Youth Democrats ==
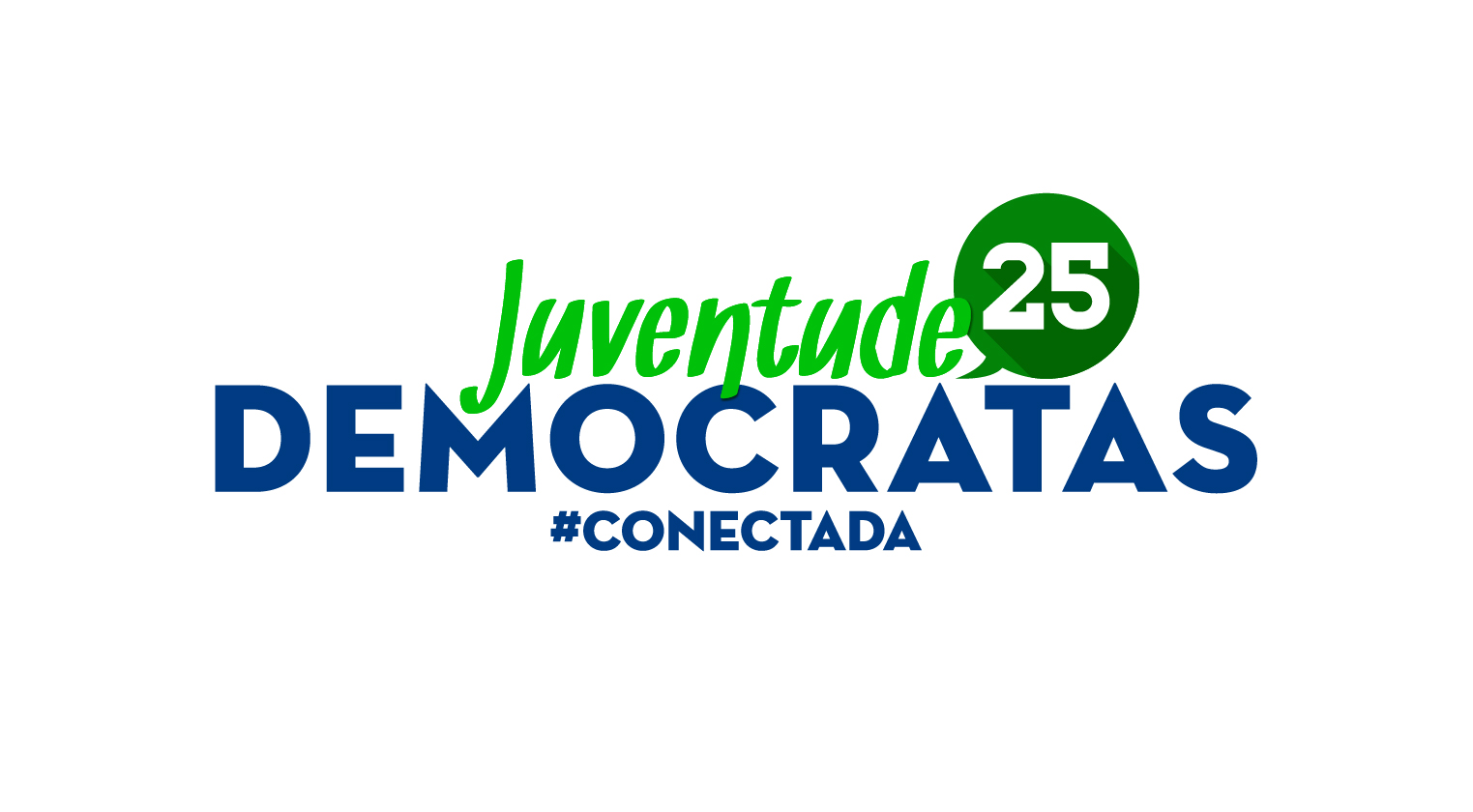
The logo of Juventude Democrata

Juventude Democratas was a nationwide doctrinal body of political action, of a political, cultural and social nature, part of the Democrats' organizational structure, with an indefinite duration. As a purpose, JDEM sought to disseminate the political doctrine adopted by the Democrats, in addition to encouraging the political participation of young people aiming at expanding the party's staff and training new leaders, supporting or promoting events, studies and research in the political, economic areas and social, aimed at disseminating, debating and discussing topics related to youth, their professional training and their development.

Internationally, they were full members of the International Young Democrat Union.

National JDEM presidents:

- ACM Neto (1999–2001)
- João Roma Neto (2001–2007)
- Efraim Filho (2007–2011)
- Henrique Sartori (2011–2013)
- Hugo Neto (2013–2014)
- Bruno Kazuhiro (2014–)

== Electoral performance ==
=== Legislative elections ===
Election	Chamber of Deputies				Federal Senate				Role in government
Election	Votes	%	Seats	+/–	Votes	%	Seats	+/–	Role in government
1986	8,374,709	17.70%	118 / 487	New	N/A	N/A	7 / 49	New	Opposition
1990	5,026,474	12.41%	83 / 502	▼35	N/A	N/A	8 / 31	▲1	Coalition
1994	5,873,370	12.85%	89 / 513	▲6	13,014,066	13.58%	11 / 54	▲3	Coalition
1998	11,526,193	17.30%	105 / 513	▲16	7,047,853	11.40%	20 / 81	▲9	Coalition
2002	11,706,253	13.38%	84 / 513	▼21	28,408,415	18.49%	19 / 81	▼1	Opposition
2006	10,182,308	10.93%	65 / 513	▼19	21,653,812	25.66%	18 / 81	▼1	Opposition
2010	7,301,171	7.56%	43 / 513	▼22	10,225,883	6.00%	6 / 81	▼12	Opposition
2014	4,085,487	4.20%	21 / 513	▼22	3,515,426	3.93%	5 / 81	▼1	Opposition (2014–2016)
2014	4,085,487	4.20%	21 / 513	▼22	3,515,426	3.93%	5 / 81	▼1	Coalition (2016–2018)
2018	4,581,162	4.66%	29 / 513	▲8	9,218,658	5.38%	7 / 81	▲2	Support
Sources: Georgetown University, Election Resources, Rio de Janeiro State University

== Notable members ==
- ACM Neto, last party president, former mayor of Salvador, Bahia
- José Agripino, former senator by Rio Grande do Norte
- Ronaldo Caiado, governor of Goiás and former senator
- Mendonça Filho, party leader in the Chamber of Deputies from Pernambuco
- João Alves Filho, former mayor of Aracaju, Sergipe
- Marco Maciel, former Vice President
- Paulo Souto, former governor of Bahia
- Cesar Maia, former mayor of Rio de Janeiro

Preceded by 23 – CDN	Numbers of Brazilian Official Political Parties; 25 – DEM	Succeeded by 26 – PNR (PAN) – defunct 27 – CD (DC)
