= José Botafogo Gonçalves =

Brazilian politician (1935–2024)

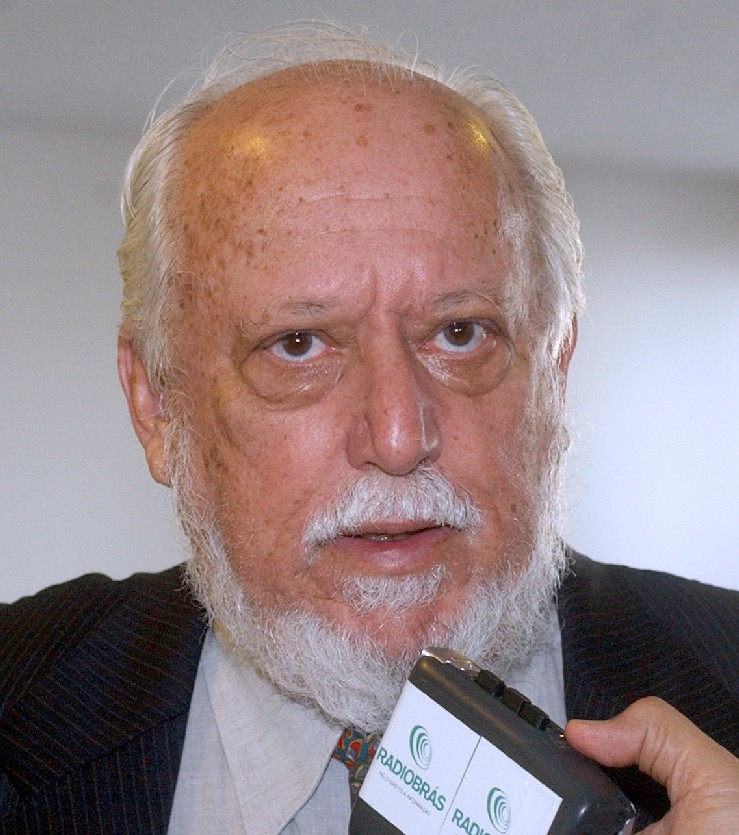
- Gonçalves in 2007

Minister of Industry, Commerce and Tourism
- In office 30 March 1998 – 1 January 1999
- President: Fernando Henrique Cardoso
- Preceded by: Francisco Dornelles
- Succeeded by: Celso Lafer

Personal details
- Born: 11 January 1935 Belo Horizonte, Minas Gerais, Brazil
- Died: 8 November 2024 (aged 89) Rio de Janeiro, Brazil
- Party: Independent
- Education: Pontifical Catholic University of Rio de Janeiro
- Occupation: Lawyer; Diplomat

José Botafogo Gonçalves (11 January 1935 – 8 November 2024) was a Brazilian lawyer, diplomat, and politician. An independent, he served as Minister of Industry, Commerce and Tourism from 1998 to 1999.

Gonçalves died of respiratory failure in Rio de Janeiro, on 8 November 2024, at the age of 89.
