= Élcio Álvares =

Brazilian politician (1932–2016)

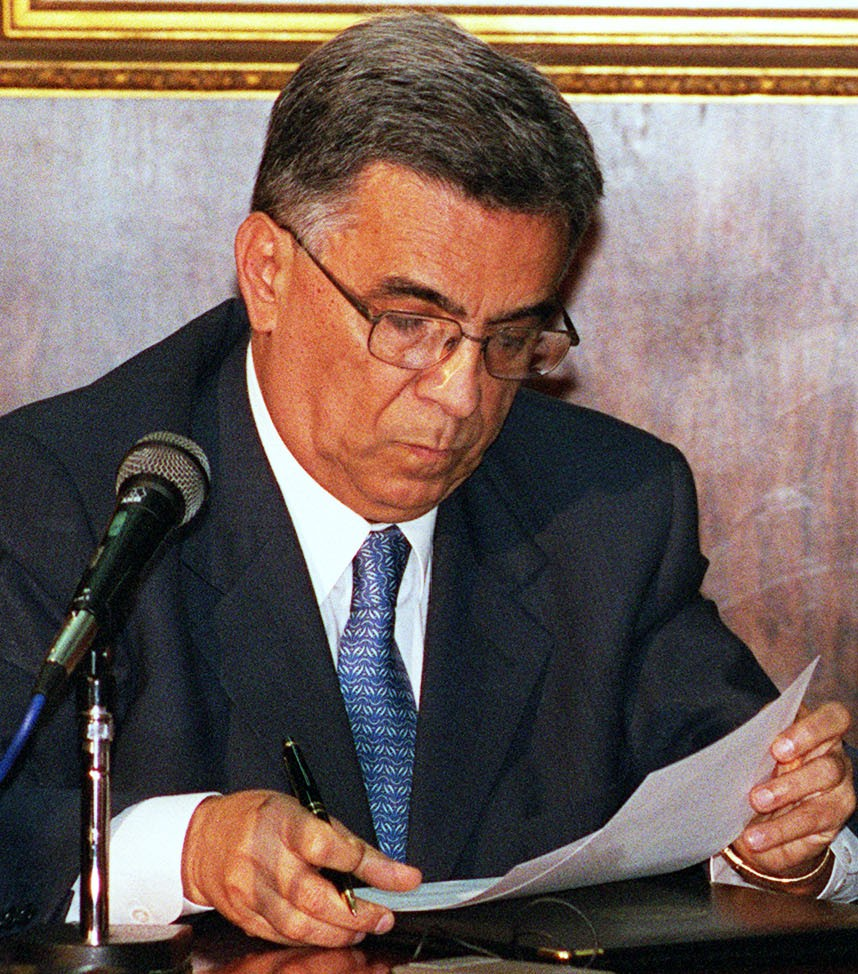

Minister of Defence
- In office June 10, 1999 – January 23, 2000
- President: Fernando Henrique Cardoso
- Preceded by: Office created
- Succeeded by: Geraldo Magela

Minister of Development, Industry and Foreign Trade
- In office January 15, 1994 – January 1, 1995
- President: Itamar Franco
- Preceded by: Ailton Barcelos Fernandes
- Succeeded by: Dorothea Werneck

Governor of Espírito Santo
- In office March 15, 1975 – March 15, 1979
- Preceded by: Artur Carlos Gerhardt Santos
- Succeeded by: Eurico Resende

Personal details
- Born: 28 September 1932 Ubá, Minas Gerais
- Died: 9 December 2016 (aged 84) Vitória, Espírito Santo
- Spouse: Irene Álvares
- Profession: Journalist, Lawyer, Professor

Élcio Álvares (28 September 1932 – 9 December 2016) was a Brazilian politician.

He was a Federal Deputy for the Brazilian Chamber of Deputies for the State of Espírito Santo (1970–1975), Governor of the State of Espírito Santo (1975–1979), Senator (1991–1994; 1995–1999), Minister of Commerce (1994) during the Franco administration, and Minister of Defence (1999–2000) during the Cardoso government.

Political offices
Preceded by Office created	Minister of Defence of Brazil; 1999–2000	Succeeded by Geraldo Magela
