= Cidadania =

Citizenship Cidadania
- President: Comte Bittencourt
- General Secretary: Regis Cavalcante
- Founded: 26 January 1992
- Registered: 19 March 1992
- Split from: Brazilian Communist Party
- Think tank: Fundação Astrojildo Pereira
- Membership (2023): ▼431,846
- Ideology: Social liberalism; Parliamentarism; Federalism; Historical: Social democracy; Democratic socialism
- Political position: Centre to centre-right; Historical: Centre-left
- National affiliation: Always Forward
- International affiliation: São Paulo Forum (1992–2004)
- Colors: Magenta; Blue; Cyan
- Identification number: 23
- Federal Senate: 0 / 81
- Chamber of Deputies: 4 / 513
- Legislative Assemblies: 17 / 1,024
- Mayors: 141 / 5,568
- Municipal Chambers: 1,586 / 58,208

Website
- rede23.org
- Politics of Brazil; Political parties; Elections; A: Currently, Cidadania is a centre-right party, but it officially still advocated social democracy through the early 2020s.

Cidadania (Brazilian Portuguese: [sidadɐˈni.ɐ]; lit. 'Citizenship') is a Brazilian political party. It was originally founded as the Popular Socialist Party (Portuguese: Partido Popular Socialista, PPS) by members of the former Brazilian Communist Party (PCB), as a centre-left social democratic and democratic socialist party.

The PPS launched Ciro Gomes as its presidential candidate at the 1998 and 2002 elections, on the former Gomes became the third-most voted candidate. Despite its left-wing alignment, PPS moved to be opposition against the Workers' Party since 2004, forming alliances with centre-right parties, in particular the Brazilian Social Democracy Party (PSDB), and supporting the Impeachment of Dilma Rousseff.

As the PPS moved more towards the center and demphasized most of its traditional socialistic politices, the party's National Convention adopted the new naming in March 2019, and it was later approved by the Superior Electoral Court that September. The party then began moving towards a more social liberal position akin to the third way.

== History ==
Logo of the former Popular Socialist Party

It was founded in 1992 after the main body of the Brazilian Communist Party (PCB) decided to reinvent itself as a social democratic party following the collapse of the Soviet Union. A minority faction of the Brazilian Communist Party retained the old name.

The PPS was a part of the coalition government of Brazilian President Luiz Inácio Lula da Silva until December 2004, when its leader withdrew its support from the coalition. Ciro Gomes of the PPS refused to resign from his position as Minister for National Integration, leading to his removal from the PPS's National Executive. The same year, PPS withdrew from the Foro de São Paulo, denouncing its support for the governments of Hugo Chávez in Venezuela and Fidel Castro in Cuba.

In the 2006 legislative elections, the party won 21 seats in the chamber of deputies. At that time party members held the state governorships of Mato Grosso and Rondônia. In the presidential election, the PPS endorsed Geraldo Alckmin of the Brazilian Social Democracy Party (PSDB).

The PPS suffered setbacks in the 2010 general elections when it lost 10 seats in the Chamber of Deputies leaving just 12 remaining, although the party won its first Senate seat. It won no state governorships. The party again supported the PSDB presidential candidate, this time José Serra, and was part of his Brazil can do more alliance.

Later the party consolidated its position in the opposition to PT. It supported the impeachment of Dilma Rousseff in 2016 and formed a coalition with the provisional government with the Brazilian Democratic Movement Party (PMDB) and the PSDB, under the rule of Michel Temer.

In 2018, the PPS leadership announced a name change. The justification, according to the leadership, was that the party needs to modernize to attract cadres from the entire political spectrum, new social movements and not be mistakenly branded as a radical party heir to the Brazilian Communist Party or close to parties linked with Brazilian old socialists like PT or PCdoB. The party received new members, such as former black-headed toucans, members of the progressive liberal LIVRES (Frees) movement, who left the PSL after the party took a hard turn to the right with Jair Bolsonaro's affiliation and support for his presidential campaign, and members of new progressive social movements like the AGORA (Now) and ACREDITO! (I Believe!). The party acquired a more liberal and less left-leaning ideology, occupying a more centrist position in the Brazilian political scenario.

The decision of the new party name was set to take place after the 2018 FIFA World Cup and the party would only rebrand itself definitively after the 2018 elections.

For the Brazilian general elections of 2018 PPS joined the coalition To unite Brazil, in support of the candidacy of Geraldo Alckmin. The coalition also includes Brazilian Social Democracy Party, Democrats, Progressistas, Party of the Republic, Brazilian Republican Party, Solidariedade, Brazilian Labour Party and Social Democratic Party.

Logo used after the name change.

Another variant of the same logo.

On 23 March 2019, in an Extraordinary Congress, the party decided to officially change its name to Citizenship (Cidadania), officially dropping any reference to socialism and social democracy and moving toward social liberal and centrist positions. The new name was to be judged by the TSE and was pending approval. On 19 September 2019, the new name was approved by TSE.

In an interview of 17 July 2019 party leader Roberto Freire said that Citizenship is in opposition to President Jair Bolsonaro, starting a process of his impeachment, although they had 83% alignment with the government in the congress.

For the 2022 Brazilian general election, Citizenship formed a federation with the Brazilian Social Democracy Party (PSDB), forming the Always Forward Federation (or simply referred as the PSDB Cidanania Federation), endorsing the campaign of Simone Tebet from the Brazilian Democratic Movement (MDB). For the second round, the party endorsed Luiz Inácio Lula da Silva.

== International relations ==
Soon after its foundation, the Popular Socialist Party became a member of the Foro de São Paulo, an association of South American leftist parties which also included the majority of Brazilian left-wing formations (PCB, PCdoB, PT, PDT, PSB). However, in 2004 PPS withdrew from the Foro, denouncing its support for authoritarian regimes in Cuba and Venezuela.

Despite being in the past a social democratic party, PPS has never been a member of the Socialist International (a position held by PDT) nor the Progressive Alliance (a position held by PSB and PT).

== Electoral results ==
=== Presidential elections ===
| Year | Candidate | Votes | % |
|---|---|---|---|
| 1998 | Ciro Gomes | 7,424,783 | 11.0% |
| 2002 | Ciro Gomes | 10,166,324 | 12.0% |
| 2006 | No candidate, endorsed Geraldo Alckmin | n/a | n/a |
| 2010 | No candidate, endorsed José Serra | n/a | n/a |
| 2014 | No candidate, endorsed Marina Silva | n/a | n/a |
| 2018 | No candidate, endorsed Geraldo Alckmin | n/a | n/a |
| 2022 | No candidate, endorsed Simone Tebet | n/a | n/a |
| 2026 | No candidate, no endorsement | n/a | n/a |

=== Legislative elections ===
| Election | Chamber of Deputies | | | | Federal Senate | | | | Role in government |
| Election | Votes | % | Seats | +/– | Votes | % | Seats | +/– | Role in government |
|---|---|---|---|---|---|---|---|---|---|
| 1994 | 256,485 | 0.56% | 2 / 513 | New | 2,447,931 | 2.55% | 1 / 54 | New | Coalition |
| 1998 | 872,348 | 1.31% | 3 / 513 | ▲1 | 1,846,897 | 2.99% | 1 / 81 | 0 | Coalition |
| 2002 | 2,682,487 | 3.07% | 15 / 513 | ▲12 | 4,720,408 | 3.07% | 1 / 81 | 0 | Opposition |
| 2006 | 3,630,462 | 3.90% | 21 / 513 | ▲6 | 1,232,571 | 1.46% | 1 / 81 | 0 | Opposition |
| 2010 | 2,536,809 | 2.63% | 12 / 513 | ▼9 | 6,766,517 | 3.97% | 1 / 81 | 0 | Opposition |
| 2014 | 1,955,689 | 2.01% | 10 / 513 | ▼2 | did not participate | | 0 / 81 | ▼1 | Opposition (2014-2016) |
| 2014 | 1,955,689 | 2.01% | 10 / 513 | ▼2 | did not participate | | 0 / 81 | ▼1 | Independent (2016-2018) |
| 2018 | 1,590,084 | 1.62% | 8 / 513 | ▼2 | 2,954,800 | 1.72% | 2 / 81 | ▲2 | Opposition |
| 2022 | 5,000,910 (Note: Votes obtained as part of Always Forward coalition.) | 4.54% | 5 / 513 | ▼3 | did not participate | | 1 / 81 | ▼1 | Opposition |
| 2026 | 291,234 | 0.26% | 0 / 513 | ▼5 | 205,849 | 0.10% | 0 / 81 | ▼1 | Extra-parliamentary |

== Main leaders ==
- Roberto Freire, National President of the party, former Minister of Culture, Federal Deputy and Senator
- Rubens Bueno, Federal Deputy
- Arnaldo Jordy, Federal Deputy
- Cristovam Buarque, former Senator, Minister of Education and Governor
- Raul Jungmann, former Minister of Defence, Minister of Public Security and Federal Deputy
- Itamar Franco, former Senator, Governor and President of Brazil
- Soninha Francine, City Councillor
- Fernando Santana, Honorary President of the party, former Constituent Deputy
- Denise Frossard, former Federal Deputy, candidate for Governor of Rio de Janeiro in 2006
- Arnaldo Jardim, Federal Deputy, former State Deputy
- Luciano Rezende, Mayor of Vitória
- Humberto Souto, Mayor of Montes Claros, former Federal Deputy
- Davi Zaia, State Deputy
- Alex Manente, Federal Deputy, former State Deputy and City Councillor
- Jorge Kajuru, Senator, former City Councillor

| Preceded by 22 – LP (PL) | Numbers of Brazilian Official Political Parties; 23 – Citizenship | Succeeded by 25 – DRP (PRD) |
