= Luiz Felipe Lampreia =

Brazilian diplomat and sociologist

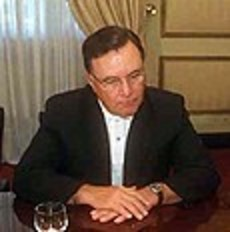

Minister of Foreign Affairs
- In office 1 January 1995 – 12 January 2001
- President: Fernando Henrique Cardoso
- Preceded by: Celso Amorim
- Succeeded by: Celso Lafer

Secretary General of Foreign Affairs
- In office 8 October 1992 – 23 June 1993
- President: Itamar Franco
- Preceded by: Luiz Felipe de Seixas Corrêa
- Succeeded by: Celso Amorim

Ambassador of Brazil to Portugal
- In office 18 August 1990 – 7 October 1992
- Nominated by: Fernando Collor de Mello
- Preceded by: Alberto da Costa e Silva
- Succeeded by: Luiz Henrique Pereira da Fonseca

Ambassador of Brazil to Suriname
- In office 18 July 1983 – 1 August 1985
- Nominated by: João Figueiredo
- Preceded by: Nestor dos Santos Lima
- Succeeded by: Sérgio Bath

Personal details
- Born: Luiz Felipe Palmeira Lampreia; 19 October 1941 Rio de Janeiro, Brazil
- Died: 2 February 2016 (aged 74) Rio de Janeiro, Brazil

Luiz Felipe Palmeira Lampreia (19 October 1941 – 2 February 2016) was a Brazilian diplomat and sociologist. He was born in Rio de Janeiro. Lampreia worked as a professor at Pontifical Catholic University of Rio de Janeiro. He served as chairman of the Industry Federation of the State of Rio de Janeiro. He created a blog during his later career called O Globo.

Lampreia served as ambassador to Suriname from 1983 until 1985, and ambassador to Portugal from 1990 to 1992. He served as Minister of Foreign Affairs from 1995 to 2001.

Lampreia died in Rio de Janeiro from a heart attack on 2 February 2016 at the age of 74.

== Honors and awards ==
- Uruguay: Medal of the Oriental Republic of Uruguay (7 May 1997).
- United Kingdom: Knight Grand Cross of the Order of St Michael and St George (GCMG).
