= Brazilian Democratic Movement =

Big tent political party in Brazil

Brazilian Democratic Movement Movimento Democrático Brasileiro
- Abbreviation: MDB
- President: Baleia Rossi
- Secretary-General: Jorge Caruso
- Founded: 4 December 1965 (original MDB); 15 January 1980 (refounded as PMDB); 19 December 2017 (altered its name back to MDB)
- Registered: 30 June 1981 (registered as PMDB)
- Dissolved: 20 December 1979 (original MDB)
- Merger of: Brazilian Labour Party; Social Democratic Party (majority)
- Headquarters: Câmara dos Deputados - Presidência do MDB, Ed. Principal sala T4 - Esplanada dos Ministérios; Brasília
- Think tank: Fundação Ulysses Guimarães
- Youth wing: Juventude do MDB
- Women's wing: MDB Mulher
- Black wing: MDB Afro
- LGBT wing: MDB Diversidade
- Membership (2023): 2,043,709
- Ideology: Economic liberalism; Neoliberalism; Big tent
- Political position: Centre to centre-right; Historical: Centre to centre-left
- Regional affiliation: COPPPAL
- Colours: Main: Green; Secondary: Yellow, red and black
- Slogan: "Balance Point"
- TSE Identification Number: 15
- Chamber of Deputies: 38 / 513
- Federal Senate: 9 / 81
- Governorships: 2 / 27
- State Assemblies: 147 / 1,024
- Mayors: 1,022 / 5,570
- City Councillors: 7,825 / 56,810

Website
- www.mdb.org.br

The Brazilian Democratic Movement (Portuguese: Movimento Democrático Brasileiro, MDB) is a Brazilian political party. It is considered a "big tent party" and it is one of the parties with the greatest representation throughout the national territory, with the largest number of senators, mayors and city councillors, It has consistently held a large presence in the National Congress since 1988, and also has the largest number of affiliates, with 2,043,709 members as of July 2023.

Originally, the MDB was founded in 1965 as part of an enforced two party system by the Brazilian military dictatorship, being the "consented opposition" — providing an official, but controlled, opposition to the governist National Renewal Alliance (ARENA). With the political opening in the early 1980s the two parties were disbanded and former members of the MDB created the Brazilian Democratic Movement Party (Portuguese: Partido do Movimento Democrático Brasileiro, PMDB), the name by which the party was known until 2018. It was the party of former Presidents of Brazil Tancredo Neves, José Sarney, Itamar Franco and Michel Temer, as well providing support for the governments of Fernando Henrique Cardoso, Luíz Inácio Lula da Silva and Dilma Rousseff, as well as unofficial support for the government of Jair Bolsonaro.

After the redemocratization of Brazil, MDB became a big tent party without a clear ideological program, seeking to have many members from various positions and different interest groups under its wing. It has been considered one of the core members of the Centrão, having supported multiple governing parties since the beginning of the Sixth Brazilian Republic. As such, the party has been criticized and accused of being a cronyistic "physiological party", which focus on negotiating support for the government in exchange for positions, resources and political influence.

== History ==
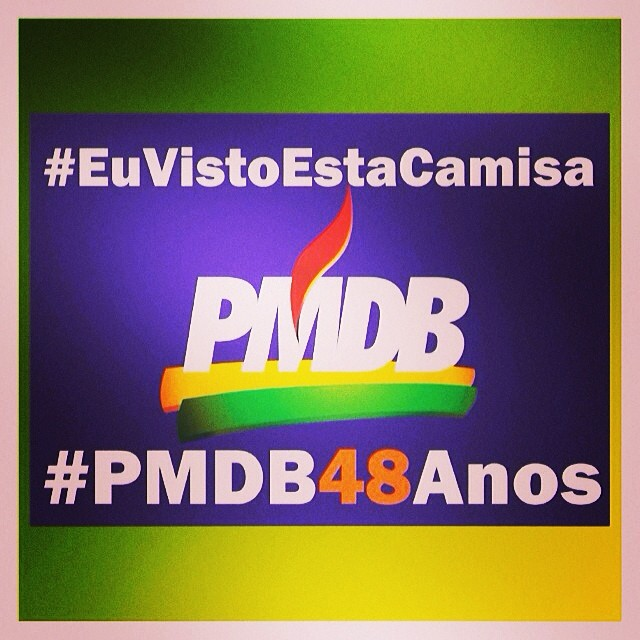
Poster commemorating the party's 48th anniversary (2014)

Logo of the Brazilian Democratic Movement, 1965–1979

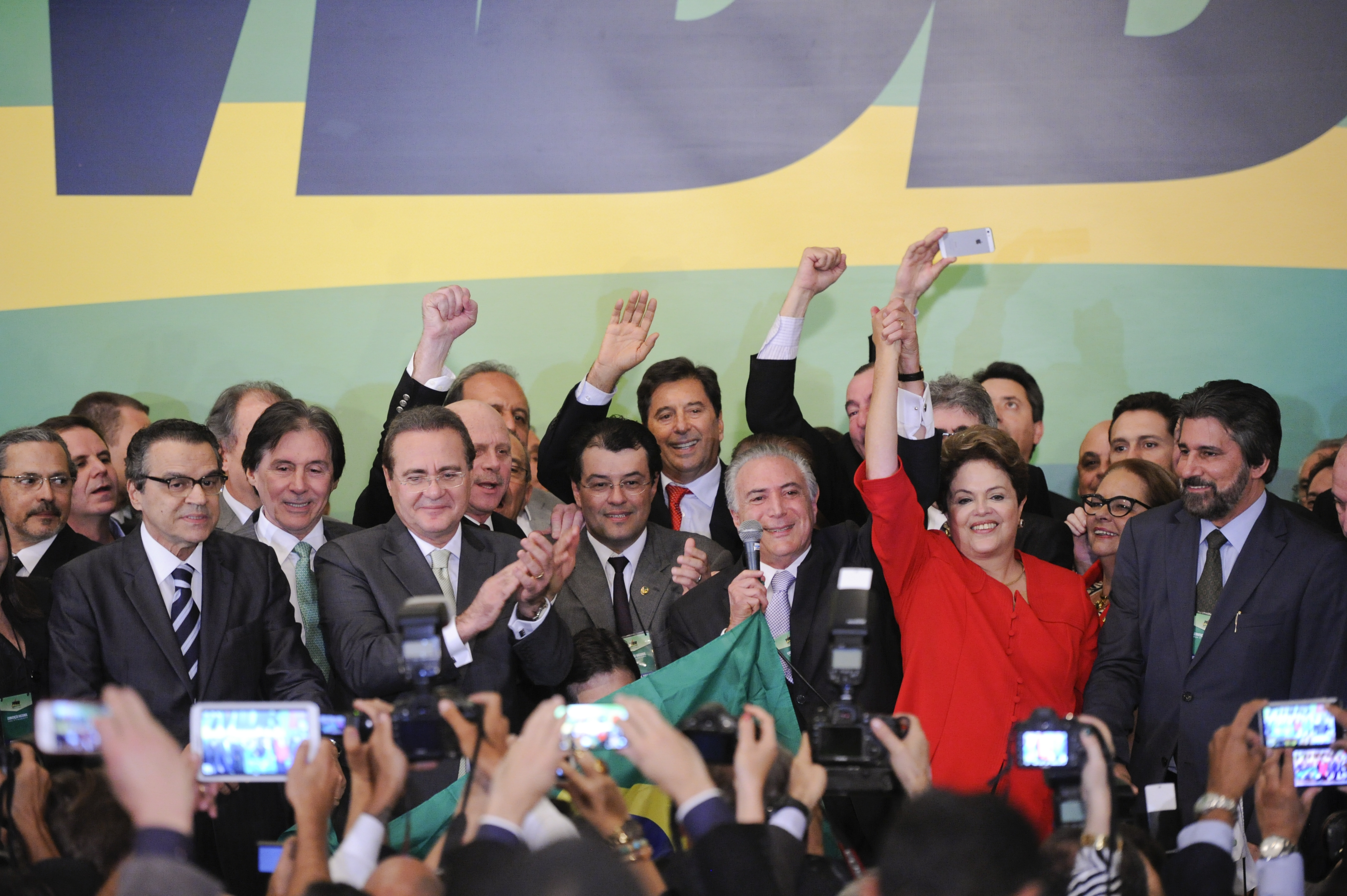
PMDB's general convention, 2014

Under military rule from 1965 to 1979, Brazil had a legally enforced two party system, with supporters of the regime gathered under the National Renewal Alliance Party (ARENA) umbrella, and the official opposition making up the MDB. Essentially, the MDB comprised nearly all of the Brazilian Labour Party and the main body of the Social Democratic Party.

For much of the first decade-and-a-half of the military dictatorship, ARENA had large majorities in the federal and state legislatures, and the MDB was virtually powerless. Since the president was indirectly elected by Congress, ARENA's candidate—in practice, selected by the military high command—could not possibly be defeated. The MDB did not even put forward candidates in the first post-coup elections, in 1966 and 1969. While the MDB did put forward presidential candidates in 1974 and 1978, they were soundly defeated.

PMDB's first logo after the founding of the party in 1979 until 1990

Starting in 1979, multipartyism was reintroduced to Brazil by the military government. A restricted number of parties were allowed and the two original parties were officially disbanded, with ARENA became officially known as the Democratic Social Party. Many of the MDB left into multiple new opposition parties such as the Democratic Labour Party (PDT), Brazilian Labour Party (PTB), Brazilian Social Democracy Party (PSDB), and the Workers' Party (PT). Even though the country was redemocratizing, the military government sought to weaken the future successor of the MDB by demanding that new parties have "Party" on their official designations, thus forcing a rebranding. The group which remained reorganized the old MDB as the Brazilian Democratic Movement Party (Portuguese: Partido do Movimento Democrático Brasileiro; PMDB).

The MDB had been a big tent party uniting nearly all of the opposition to the military dictatorship. As such, it harboured elements ranging across the political spectrum. PMDB had a similar character to its predecessor, including a range of politicians from conservatives such as José Sarney to liberals such as Pedro Simon, leftists like Roberto Requião, populists like Íris Resende, nationalists like Orestes Quércia and the former guerrilla movement MR-8.

In 1985, party leader Tancredo Neves won the presidential election, but died before taking office. His running mate José Sarney, who had recently joined the party after defecting from the political wing of the military, became president, serving until 1990. Up until 2016, he was the only president of Brazil to come from the party. In recent presidential elections the party has not run candidates of its own, preferring to focus on congressional and gubernatorial elections.

At the legislative elections on 6 October 2002, the party won 74 out of 513 seats in the Chamber of Deputies and 19 out of 81 seats in the Senate, making it one of the biggest parties in Brazil.

The party decided not to launch a candidate for the 2006 presidential election in order to be free to join any coalition in the states. Under Brazilian electoral law then, parties launching presidential candidates could not form alliances at the state level that differed at the national level (this norm was subsequently repealed). At the congressional elections in October 2006, PMDB won 89 of 513 seats in the Chamber of Deputies, becoming its biggest party; and in the Senate it had 15 of the 81 seats after its one-third renovation, becoming the third-largest party. PMDB also won seven state gubernatorial elections in the same election.

In 2010, the party made gains in the Senate, winning 16 of the elected seats for a total of 20. It was somewhat weakened in other elections, winning 79 seats in the Chamber of Deputies (becoming the second largest party) and winning five state governorships.

Notable PMDB members included: Wanderlei Silva, Tancredo Neves, Ulysses Guimarães, Itamar Franco, Orestes Quércia, Michel Temer, Anthony Garotinho, José Sarney, Renan Calheiros, Pedro Simon, Roberto Requião, Germano Rigotto, Paulo Skaf, Ramez Tebet, Marcelo Fortuna, Iris Rezende and Maguito Vilela.

On 29 March 2016, PMDB announced that it was leaving the coalition with the Workers' Party following accusations against President Dilma Rousseff and former president Luiz Inácio Lula da Silva of corruption. The PMDB supported the impeachment process against Dilma Rousseff. After the impeachment process began, vice president Michel Temer formed a new center-right liberal coalition government with PSDB and other parties. He was confirmed as president as Dilma was permanently removed from office by the Senate on August, 31st 2016, thus becoming the second Brazilian president to hail from PMDB.

On 19 December 2017, the party reverted to its former name, Brazilian Democratic Movement (Portuguese: Movimento Democrático Brasileiro, MDB). The move was seen as an attempt to renew party identity. The initials PMDB had become associated with corruption and cronyism, while the original acronym was associated with the struggle for democracy, according to party leader, Romero Jucá. The party announced a program based on economic liberalism, fiscal conservatism and greater openness to sectors of civil society such as evangelicals and environmentalists. The party also made it clear that it will prioritize parliamentarians who agree with the new positions of the party, which has been interpreted by many as a warning that rebel parliamentarians, especially the senator from Paraná, Roberto Requião, strongly associated with the Brazilian nationalist left (and who eventually left the party in the summer of 2021 and eventually joined the Workers' Party), and even Renan Calheiros, the President of the Federal Senate, considered one of the most powerful personalities of Brazilian politics, but who shows little alignment with Temer's government and propositions of economic liberalism, can be excluded from the party. A few days earlier, Senator Kátia Abreu of Tocantins was expelled from the party for her support of the opposition, especially for her firm stance against the pension reform, as an alignment to the PT of whom she had been allied in the mandate of Dilma Rousseff.

The PMDB is the Brazilian political party that received the most bribes from Odebrecht. The company's "institutional relations" manager, Melo Filho, says he can find among the PMDB senators "the parliamentarians most devoted to the group's interests", but also those "who asked for the highest contributions".

== Ideology ==
The original MDB was founded as a legal, civil movement of opposition to Brazilian military government. Without a clear program except the democratization of the country, the party was an umbrella of opponents of military regime, ranging from liberal conservatives and Christian democrats from parties like Christian Democratic Party and Social Democratic Party to former labourists, socialists and communists, of Brazilian Labour Party, Brazilian Socialist Party and Brazilian Communist Party. With the redemocratization, many centrists and leftists left the party and joined other parties with more consistent ideologies.

Many Christian democrats, social liberals and social democrats broke with the party in 1988 to form the Brazilian Social Democracy Party, led by Mario Covas, Fernando Henrique Cardoso, José Serra and Franco Montoro. Other PMDB members exited the party to more established left-wing parties, like the new incarnation of Brazilian Socialist Party, Communist Party of Brazil and Democratic Labour Party. In 2009, the last left-wing section of the party abandoned it and formed the Free Fatherland Party, a far left party descending from the MR-8 guerrilla. Some strong leftists, however, like senator Roberto Requião, remained in the party, but more isolated and less powerful (Requião too would eventually leave the party in July 2021). Other powerful politicians within the party, like former Rio de Janeiro governor Sérgio Cabral Filho and senator Renan Calheiros, established a neutral political stance, sometimes described as "physiological" by critics.

The left-wing loss was strong, and as such, the positions of those who left were replaced eventually by dissidents of centrist, centre-left and even right-wing parties, who joined to avoid falling out of power (as independent candidates are not allowed to run in elections in Brazil) and/or losing feuds with local or national party leadership. This replacement changed the character of the party from a catch-all party to a centrist one with a visible centre-right tendency. The party denied the centre-right character or any strict adherence to any political ideology. The party maintains that it is an open party for any and all Brazilians committed to democracy.

The party's programme from 2015 is based on the document "Bridge to the Future" detailing the measures to be taken to modernise Brazil, including reform of the labour code, overhaul of the pension system, privatisation of some public companies and reduction of some social rights.

It has also been described as christian democratic.

== Electoral history ==
=== Presidential elections ===
| Election | Party candidate | Running mate | Coalition | Votes | % | Votes | % | Result |
| Election | Party candidate | Running mate | Coalition | First round | | Second round | | Result |
|---|---|---|---|---|---|---|---|---|
| 1974 | Ulysses Guimarães (MDB) | Barbosa Lima Sobrinho (MDB) | None | 76 | 16,0% | - | - | Lost ✗ |
| 1978 | Euler Bentes Moreiro (MDB) | Paulo Brossard (MDB) | None | 226 | 38.9% | - | - | Lost ✗ |
| 1985 | Tancredo Neves (PMDB) | José Sarney (PMDB) | PMDB; PFL | 480 | 72.73% | - | - | Elected ✓ |
| 1989 | Ulysses Guimarães (PMDB) | Waldir Pires (PMDB) | None | 3,204,853 | 4.7% | - | - | Lost ✗ |
| 1994 | Orestes Quércia (PMDB) | Iris de Araújo (PMDB) | PMDB; PSD | 2,773,497 | 4.4% | - | - | Lost ✗ |
| 1998 | None | None | None | - | - | - | - | - |
| 2002 | José Serra (PSDB) | Rita Camata (PMDB) | PSDB; PMDB | 19,705,061 | 23.19% | 33,370,739 | 38.72% | Lost ✗ |
| 2006 | None | None | None | - | - | - | - | - |
| 2010 | Dilma Rousseff (PT) | Michel Temer (PMDB) | (PT; PMDB; PDT; PCdoB; PSB; PR; PRB; PSC; PTC; PTN) | 47,651,434 | 46.91% | 55,752,529 | 56.05% | Elected ✓ |
| 2014 | Dilma Rousseff (PT) | Michel Temer (PMDB) | (PT; PMDB; PSD; PP; PR; PDT; PRB; PROS; PCdoB) | 43,267,668 | 41.59% | 54,501,119 | 51.64% | Elected ✓ |
| 2018 | Henrique Meirelles (MDB) | Germano Rigotto (MDB) | (MDB; PHS) | 1,288,948 | 1.20% | - | - | Lost ✗ |
| 2022 | Simone Tebet (MDB) | Mara Gabrilli (PSDB) | (MDB; PSDB; Cidadania; PODE) | 4,915,420 | 4.16% | - | - | Lost ✗ |

=== Legislative elections ===
| Election | Chamber of Deputies | | | | Federal Senate | | | | Role in government |
| Election | Votes | %' | Seats | +/– | Votes | % | Seats | +/– | Role in government |
|---|---|---|---|---|---|---|---|---|---|
| 1966 | 4,915,470 | 36.0% | 132 / 409 | New | 5,911,361 | 43.4% | 4 / 23 | New | Opposition |
| 1970 | 4,777,927 | 30.5% | 87 / 310 | ▼45 | 13,440,875 | 39.6% | 6 / 46 | ▲2 | Opposition |
| 1974 | 10,954,359 | 48.0% | 161 / 364 | ▲74 | 14,486,252 | 59.0% | 16 / 22 | ▲10 | Opposition |
| 1978 | 14,803,526 | 49.6% | 191 / 422 | ▲30 | 17,432,948 | 57.1% | 8 / 23 | ▼8 | Opposition |
| 1982 | 17,666,773 | 43.0% | 200 / 479 | ▲9 | 18,410,338 | 43.7% | 9 / 25 | ▲1 | Opposition |
| 1986 | 22,633,805 | 47.8% | 260 / 487 | ▲60 | N/A | N/A | 38 / 49 | ▲29 | Majority |
| 1990 | 7,798,653 | 19.3% | 108 / 502 | ▼152 | N/A | N/A | 8 / 31 | ▼30 | Coalition |
| 1994 | 9,287,049 | 20.3% | 107 / 513 | ▼1 | 14,870,466 | 15.5% | 14 / 54 | ▲6 | Coalition |
| 1998 | 10,105,609 | 15.2% | 83 / 513 | ▼24 | 13,414,074 | 21.7% | 26 / 81 | ▲18 | Coalition |
| 2002 | 11,692,011 | 13.4% | 76 / 513 | ▼7 | 25,199,662 | 15.4% | 19 / 81 | ▼7 | Coalition |
| 2006 | 13,580,517 | 14.6% | 89 / 513 | ▲13 | 10,148,024 | 12.0% | 16 / 81 | ▼3 | Coalition |
| 2010 | 12,537,252 | 13.0% | 79 / 513 | ▼10 | 23,998,949 | 14.1% | 19 / 81 | ▲3 | Coalition |
| 2014 | 10,791,949 | 11.09% | 66 / 513 | ▼13 | 12,129,969 | 13.58% | 18 / 81 | ▼1 | Coalition |
| 2018 | 5,439,167 | 5.5% | 34 / 513 | ▼17 | 12,800,290 | 7.5% | 12 / 81 | ▼6 | Confidence and Supply |
| 2022 | 7,992,988 | 7.2% | 42 / 513 | ▲8 | 3,882,458 | 3.8% | 10 / 81 | ▼2 | Coalition (2022–2023) |
| 2022 | 7,992,988 | 7.2% | 42 / 513 | ▲8 | 3,882,458 | 3.8% | 10 / 81 | ▼2 | Independent (2023–2024) |
| 2022 | 7,992,988 | 7.2% | 42 / 513 | ▲8 | 3,882,458 | 3.8% | 10 / 81 | ▼2 | Coalition (2024–2025) |
| 2022 | 7,992,988 | 7.2% | 42 / 513 | ▲8 | 3,882,458 | 3.8% | 10 / 81 | ▼2 | Confidence and Supply (2025–present) |
| 2026 | 7,890,384 | 6.93% | 36 / 513 | ▼6 | 11,881,617 | 5.73% | 8 / 81 | ▼2 | TBA |

== See also ==
- List of political parties in Brazil

| Preceded by 14 - Mission (Missão) | Numbers of Brazilian Official Political Parties; 15 - BDM (MDB) | Succeeded by 16 - USWP (PSTU) |
