= List of diplomatic missions of Brazil =

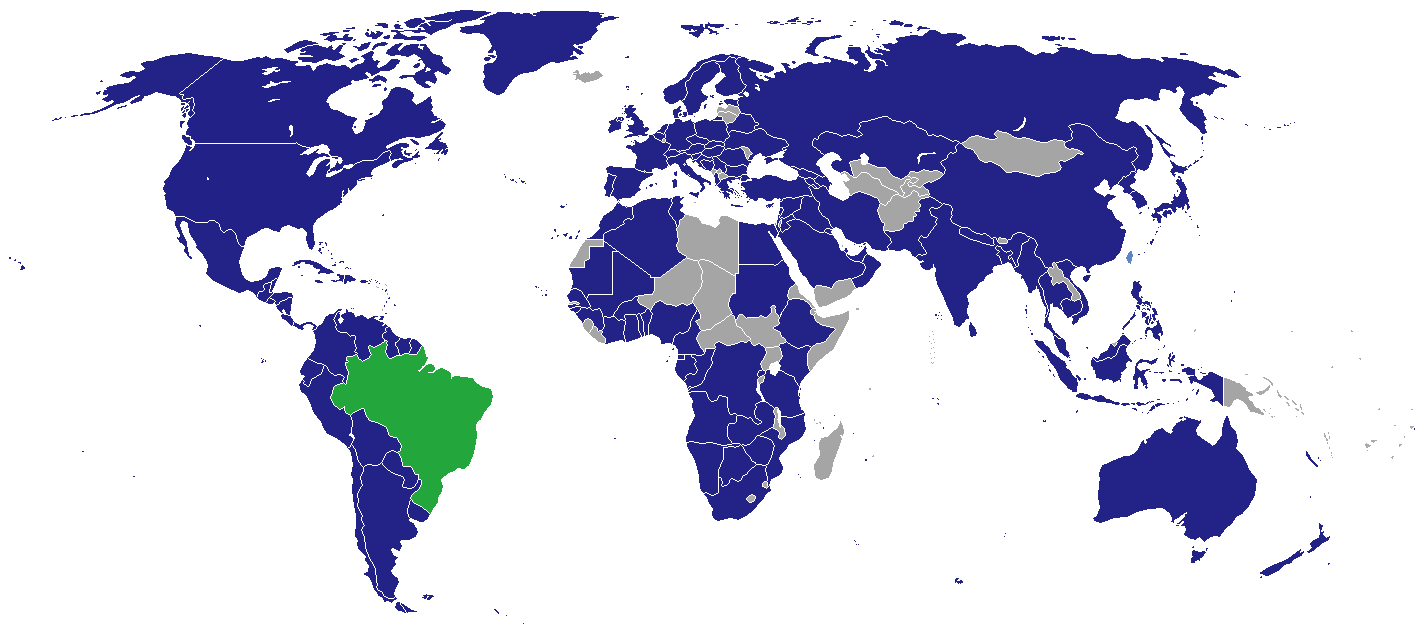
States hosting a diplomatic mission of Brazil

This is a list of diplomatic missions of the Federative Republic of Brazil, excluding Honorary Consulates.

The Ministry of Foreign Affairs of Brazil was established by Emperor Pedro I in 1823, shortly after the independence of Brazil.

Brazil maintains diplomatic relations with all the other 192 member states of the United Nations, in addition to United Nations General Assembly observers Holy See, Palestine and Order of Malta, as well as the Cook Islands, and Niue, and unofficial relations with Taiwan. The country has a large global network of 136 resident diplomatic missions, 1 commercial office, 1 representative office and several missions to multilateral organizations.

In Brazil, Itamaraty is generally used as a metonymy for the Ministry of Foreign Affairs. The name stems from that of the palaces in Rio de Janeiro and Brasília, former and present headquarters of the Ministry.

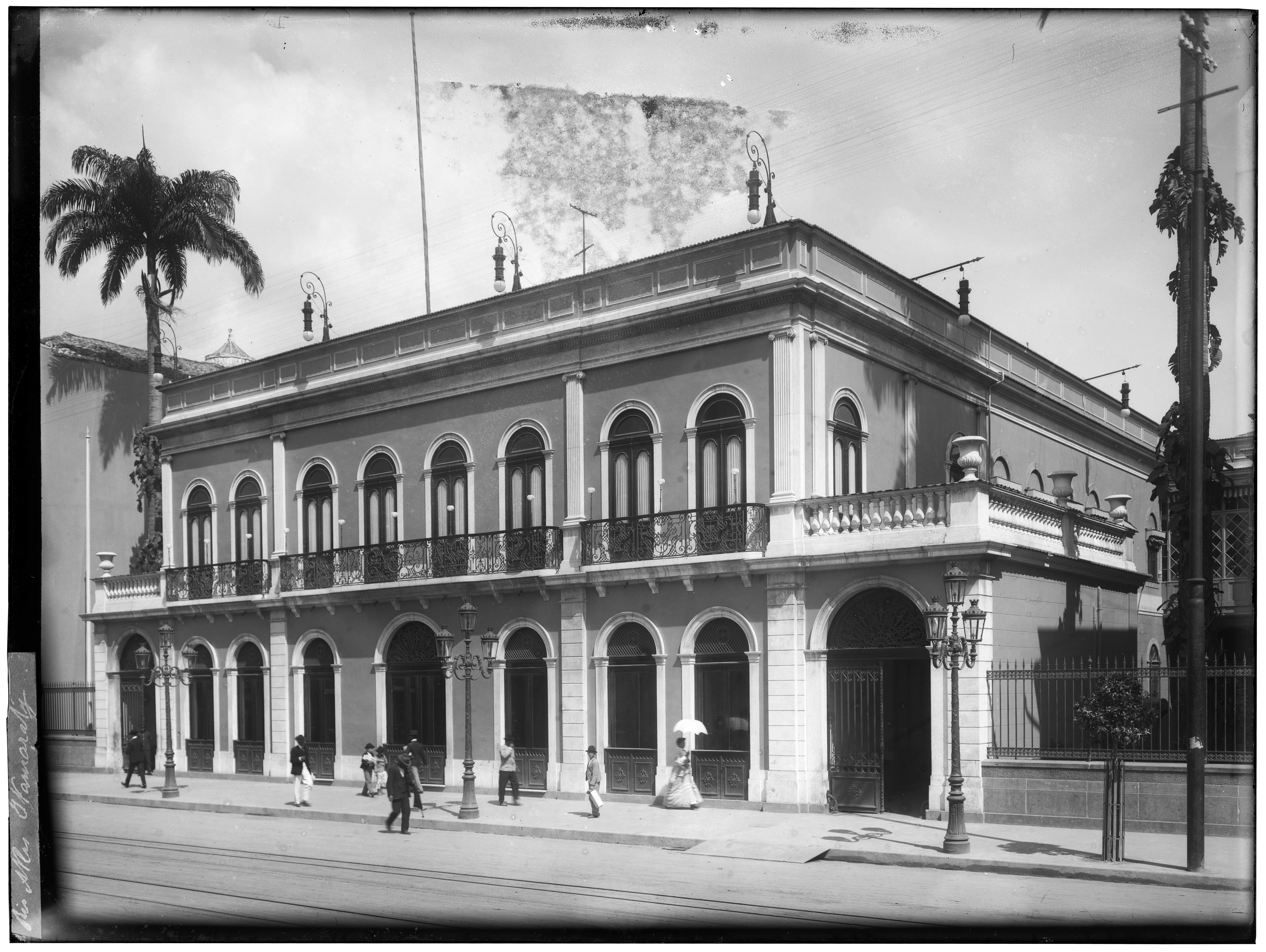
Former Itamaraty Palace in Rio de Janeiro

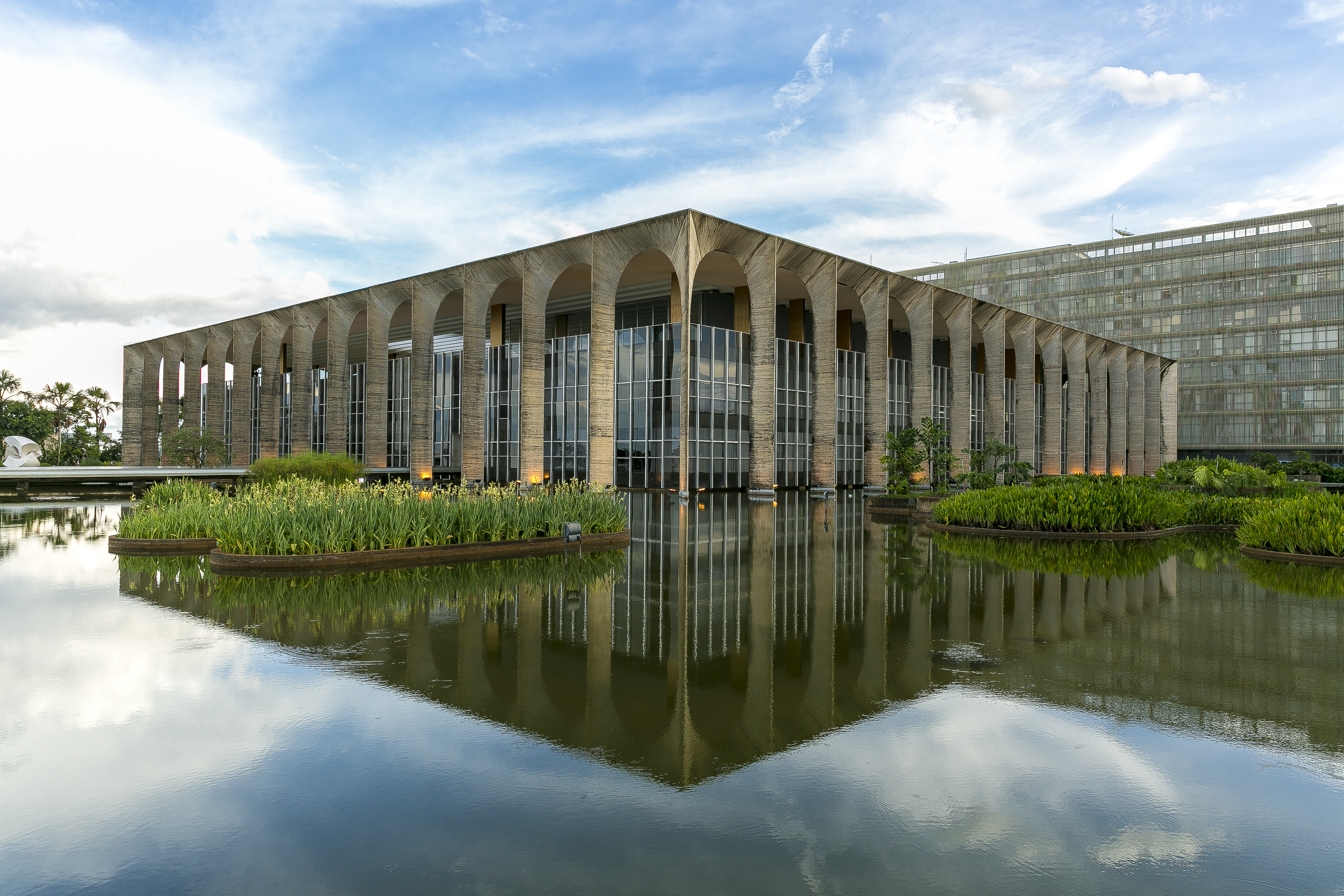
Itamaraty Palace in Brasília

== Current missions ==
=== Africa ===
Host country	Host city	Mission	Image	Concurrent accreditation	Ref.
Algeria	Algiers	Embassy			
Angola	Luanda	Embassy			
Angola	Luanda	Consulate-General			
Benin	Cotonou	Embassy		Countries: Niger	
Botswana	Gaborone	Embassy			
Burkina Faso	Ouagadougou	Embassy			
Cameroon	Yaoundé	Embassy		Countries: Chad	
Cape Verde	Praia	Embassy			
Congo-Brazzaville	Brazzaville	Embassy		Countries: Central African Republic	
Congo-Kinshasa	Kinshasa	Embassy			
Egypt	Cairo	Embassy		Countries: Eritrea	
Equatorial Guinea	Malabo	Embassy			
Ethiopia	Addis Ababa	Embassy		Countries: Djibouti; South Sudan; International Organizations: African Union (Note: Accredited as an observer mission.); Intergovernmental Authority on Development; UNECA	
Gabon	Libreville	Embassy			
Ghana	Accra	Embassy		Countries: Liberia; Sierra Leone	
Guinea	Conakry	Embassy			
Guinea-Bissau	Bissau	Embassy			
Ivory Coast	Abidjan	Embassy			
Kenya	Nairobi	Embassy		Countries: Burundi; Somalia; Uganda; International Organizations: United Nations; United Nations Environment Programme; United Nations Human Settlements Programme	
Mali	Bamako	Embassy			
Mauritania	Nouakchott	Embassy			
Morocco	Rabat	Embassy			
Mozambique	Maputo	Embassy		Countries: Eswatini; Madagascar	
Namibia	Windhoek	Embassy			
Nigeria	Abuja	Embassy			
Nigeria	Lagos	Consulate-General			
Rwanda	Kigali	Embassy			
São Tomé and Príncipe	São Tomé	Embassy			
Senegal	Dakar	Embassy		Countries: Gambia	
South Africa	Pretoria	Embassy		Countries: Lesotho; Mauritius	
South Africa	Cape Town	Consulate-General		Countries: Lesotho; Mauritius	
Sudan	Khartoum	Embassy			
Tanzania	Dar es Salaam	Embassy		Countries: Comoros; Seychelles	
Togo	Lomé	Embassy			
Tunisia	Tunis	Embassy		Countries: Libya	
Zambia	Lusaka	Embassy		Countries: Malawi	
Zimbabwe	Harare	Embassy			

=== Americas ===
Host country	Host city	Mission	Image	Concurrent accreditation	Ref.
Argentina	Buenos Aires	Embassy			
Argentina	Buenos Aires	Consulate-General			
Argentina	Córdoba	Consulate-General			
Argentina	Mendoza	Consulate-General			
Argentina	Paso de los Libres	Consulate			
Argentina	Puerto Iguazú	Consulate			
Bahamas	Nassau	Embassy			
Barbados	Bridgetown	Embassy		Countries: Antigua and Barbuda; Saint Kitts and Nevis	
Belize	Belmopan	Embassy			
Bolivia	La Paz	Embassy			
Bolivia	Cochabamba	Consulate-General			
Bolivia	Santa Cruz de la Sierra	Consulate-General			
Bolivia	Cobija	Consulate			
Bolivia	Guayaramerín	Consulate			
Bolivia	Puerto Quijarro	Consulate			
Canada	Ottawa	Embassy			
Canada	Montreal	Consulate-General			
Canada	Toronto	Consulate-General			
Canada	Vancouver	Consulate-General			
Chile	Santiago de Chile	Embassy			
Chile	Santiago de Chile	Consulate-General			
Colombia	Bogotá	Embassy			
Colombia	Leticia	Vice-Consulate			
Costa Rica	San José	Embassy			
Cuba	Havana	Embassy			
Dominican Republic	Santo Domingo	Embassy			
Ecuador	Quito	Embassy			
El Salvador	San Salvador	Embassy			
Guatemala	Guatemala City	Embassy			
Guyana	Georgetown	Embassy			
Guyana	Lethem	Vice-Consulate			
Haiti	Port-au-Prince	Embassy			
Honduras	Tegucigalpa	Embassy			
Jamaica	Kingston	Embassy		International Organizations: International Seabed Authority	
Mexico	Mexico City	Embassy		International Organizations: OPANAL	
Mexico	Mexico City	Consulate-General		International Organizations: OPANAL	
Nicaragua	Managua	Embassy			
Panama	Panama City	Embassy			
Paraguay	Asunción	Embassy			
Paraguay	Asunción	Consulate-General			
Paraguay	Ciudad del Este	Consulate-General			
Paraguay	Pedro Juan Caballero	Consulate			
Paraguay	Saltos del Guairá	Consulate			
Paraguay	Concepción	Vice-Consulate			
Paraguay	Encarnación	Vice-Consulate			
Peru	Lima	Embassy			
Peru	Iquitos	Vice-Consulate			
Saint Lucia	Castries	Embassy		Countries: Dominica	
Saint Vincent and the Grenadines	Kingstown	Embassy			
Suriname	Paramaribo	Embassy			
Trinidad and Tobago	Port of Spain	Embassy		Countries: Grenada	
United States	Washington, D.C.	Embassy			
United States	Washington, D.C.	Consulate-General			
United States	Atlanta	Consulate-General			
United States	Boston	Consulate-General			
United States	Chicago	Consulate-General			
United States	Hartford	Consulate-General			
United States	Houston	Consulate-General			
United States	Los Angeles	Consulate-General			
United States	Miami	Consulate-General			
United States	New York City	Consulate-General			
United States	Orlando	Consulate-General			
United States	San Francisco	Consulate-General			
Uruguay	Montevideo	Embassy			
Uruguay	Montevideo	Consulate-General			
Uruguay	Rivera	Consulate-General			
Uruguay	Chuy	Consulate			
Uruguay	Artigas	Vice-Consulate			
Uruguay	Río Branco	Vice-Consulate			
Venezuela	Caracas	Embassy			
Venezuela	Santa Elena de Uairén	Vice-Consulate			

=== Asia ===
Host country	Host city	Mission	Image	Concurrent accreditation	Ref.
Armenia	Yerevan	Embassy			
Azerbaijan	Baku	Embassy			
Bahrain	Manama	Embassy			
Bangladesh	Dhaka	Embassy			
Cambodia	Phnom Penh	Embassy			
China	Beijing	Embassy		Countries: Mongolia	
China	Chengdu	Consulate-General		Countries: Mongolia	
China	Guangzhou	Consulate-General		Countries: Mongolia	
China	Hong Kong	Consulate-General		Countries: Mongolia	
China	Shanghai	Consulate-General		Countries: Mongolia	
Georgia	Tbilisi	Embassy			
India	New Delhi	Embassy		Countries: Bhutan	
India	Mumbai	Consulate-General		Countries: Bhutan	
Indonesia	Jakarta	Embassy			
Iran	Tehran	Embassy			
Iraq	Baghdad	Embassy			
Israel	Tel Aviv	Embassy			
Japan	Tokyo	Embassy			
Japan	Tokyo	Consulate-General			
Japan	Hamamatsu	Consulate-General			
Japan	Nagoya	Consulate-General			
Jordan	Amman	Embassy			
Kazakhstan	Astana	Embassy		Countries: Kyrgyzstan; Turkmenistan	
Kuwait	Kuwait City	Embassy			
Lebanon	Beirut	Embassy			
Malaysia	Kuala Lumpur	Embassy		Countries: Brunei	
Myanmar	Yangon	Embassy			
Nepal	Kathmandu	Embassy			
North Korea	Pyongyang	Embassy			
Oman	Muscat	Embassy			
Pakistan	Islamabad (Note: The Embassy was transferred from Karachi to Islamabad in 1967.)	Embassy		Countries: Afghanistan; Tajikistan	
Palestine	Ramallah	Representative office			
Philippines	Manila	Embassy		Countries: Marshall Islands; Micronesia; Palau	
Qatar	Doha	Embassy			
Republic of China (Taiwan)	Taipei	Commercial office (Note: The website of the Ministry of Foreign Affairs of Brazil lists the Commercial Office to Taipei (ROC) under the jurisdiction of China (PRC), in line with the One China principle, officially reaffirmed during the State visit to Brazil of President Xi Jinping on November 20, 2024.)			
Saudi Arabia	Riyadh (Note: The Embassy was transferred from Jeddah to Riyadh in 1986.)	Embassy		Countries: Yemen	
Singapore	Singapore	Embassy			
South Korea	Seoul	Embassy			
Sri Lanka	Colombo	Embassy		Countries: Maldives	
Syria	Damascus	Embassy			
Thailand	Bangkok	Embassy		Countries: Laos	
Timor-Leste	Dili	Embassy			
Turkey	Ankara	Embassy			
Turkey	Istanbul	Consulate-General			
United Arab Emirates	Abu Dhabi	Embassy			
Vietnam	Hanoi	Embassy			

=== Europe ===
Host country	Host city	Mission	Image	Concurrent accreditation	Ref.
Albania	Tirana	Embassy			
Austria	Vienna (Note: Formerly Legation to the Austro-Hungarian Empire.)	Embassy		International Organizations: United Nations; UNIDO; UNCITRAL; UNODC	
Belarus	Minsk	Embassy			
Belgium	Brussels	Embassy		Countries: Luxembourg	
Belgium	Brussels	Consulate-General		Countries: Luxembourg	
Bosnia and Herzegovina	Sarajevo	Embassy			
Bulgaria	Sofia	Embassy		Countries: North Macedonia	
Croatia	Zagreb	Embassy			
Cyprus	Nicosia	Embassy			
Czech Republic	Prague (Note: Formerly Embassy to Czechoslovakia.)	Embassy			
Denmark	Copenhagen	Embassy		Countries: Lithuania	
Estonia	Tallinn	Embassy			
Finland	Helsinki	Embassy			
France	Paris	Embassy		Countries: Monaco	
France	Paris	Consulate-General		Countries: Monaco	
France	Cayenne	Consulate-General		Countries: Monaco	
France	Marseille	Consulate-General		Countries: Monaco	
France	St. Georges de l'Oyapock	Consulate		Countries: Monaco	
Germany (Note: 1871 onwards, following the Proclamation of the German Empire.)	Berlin (Note: In 1942 the Embassy in Berlin was closed. In 1951 the Embassy to West Germany opened in Bonn. Between 1973 and 1990 Brazil also had an Embassy to East Germany in East Berlin. Following the German reunification, the Embassy in East Germany was closed and Bonn became the Embassy to Germany. In 2000 the Embassy was moved back to Berlin and the mission in Bonn was extinct.)	Embassy			
Germany	Frankfurt	Consulate-General			
Germany	Munich	Consulate-General			
Greece	Athens	Embassy			
Holy See (Note: The Brazilian Embassy to the Holy See is located outside the Vatican territory in Rome.)	Rome	Embassy		Sovereign entity: Sovereign Military Order of Malta	
Hungary	Budapest	Embassy			
Ireland	Dublin	Embassy			
Italy (Note: 1861 onwards, following the Proclamation of the Kingdom of Italy.)	Rome (Note: 1871 onwards. Between 1861 and 1871 the Legation to the Kingdom of Italy was located in the former capitals Turin (previously Legation to Sardinia) and Florence (previously Legation to Tuscany).)	Embassy		Countries: Malta; San Marino	
Italy	Rome	Consulate-General		Countries: Malta; San Marino	
Italy	Milan	Consulate-General		Countries: Malta; San Marino	
Netherlands	The Hague	Embassy		International Organizations: OPCW	
Netherlands	Amsterdam	Consulate-General		International Organizations: OPCW	
Norway	Oslo	Embassy		Countries: Iceland	
Poland	Warsaw	Embassy			
Portugal	Lisbon	Embassy			
Portugal	Lisbon	Consulate-General			
Portugal	Faro	Consulate-General			
Portugal	Porto	Consulate-General			
Romania	Bucharest	Embassy			
Russia	Moscow (Note: The Embassy in Petrograd was closed in 1920 and reopened in Moscow in 1945.)	Embassy		Countries: Uzbekistan	
Serbia	Belgrade (Note: Formerly Embassy to Yugoslavia.)	Embassy		Countries: Montenegro	
Slovakia	Bratislava	Embassy			
Slovenia	Ljubljana	Embassy			
Spain	Madrid	Embassy		Countries: Andorra	
Spain	Madrid	Consulate-General		Countries: Andorra	
Spain	Barcelona	Consulate-General		Countries: Andorra	
Sweden	Stockholm	Embassy		Countries: Latvia	
Switzerland	Bern	Embassy		Countries: Liechtenstein	
Switzerland	Geneva	Consulate-General		Countries: Liechtenstein	
Switzerland	Zurich	Consulate-General		Countries: Liechtenstein	
Ukraine	Kyiv	Embassy		Countries: Moldova	
United Kingdom	London	Embassy			
United Kingdom	London	Consulate-General			
United Kingdom	Edinburgh	Consulate-General			

=== Oceania ===
Host country	Host city	Mission	Image	Concurrent accreditation	Ref.
Australia	Canberra	Embassy		Countries: Fiji; Nauru; Papua New Guinea; Solomon Islands; Vanuatu	
Australia	Sydney	Consulate-General		Countries: Fiji; Nauru; Papua New Guinea; Solomon Islands; Vanuatu	
New Zealand	Wellington	Embassy		Countries: Kiribati; Samoa; Tonga; Tuvalu; Sovereign entities: Cook Islands; Niue	

=== Multilateral organizations ===
Organization	Host city	Host country	Type of mission	Image	Ref.
Association of Southeast Asian Nations	Jakarta	Indonesia	Mission		
Conference on Disarmament	Geneva	Switzerland	Permanent Mission		
CPLP	Lisbon	Portugal	Permanent Mission		
European Union	Brussels	Belgium	Permanent Mission		
Food and Agriculture Organization International Fund for Agricultural Development World Food Programme	Rome	Italy	Permanent Delegation		
International Atomic Energy Agency CTBTO Preparatory Commission	Vienna	Austria	Permanent Mission		
International Civil Aviation Organization	Montreal	Canada	Permanent Delegation		
International Coffee Organization International Maritime Organization International Mobile Satellite Organization International Sugar Organization International Whaling Commission	London	United Kingdom	Permanent Representation		
LAIA Mercosur	Montevideo	Uruguay	Permanent Delegation		
OAS	Washington, D.C.	United States	Permanent Mission		
UNESCO	Paris	France	Permanent Delegation		
United Nations	Geneva	Switzerland	Permanent Mission		
United Nations	New York City	United States	Permanent Mission		
World Trade Organization	Geneva	Switzerland	Permanent Mission		

== Closed missions ==
=== Africa ===
Host country	Host city	Mission	Year closed	Ref.
Liberia	Monrovia	Embassy	2020	
Libya	Tripoli	Embassy	2014	
Malawi	Lilongwe	Embassy	2022	
Sierra Leone	Freetown	Embassy	2020	

=== Americas ===
Host country	Host city	Mission	Year closed	Ref.
Antigua and Barbuda	St. John's	Embassy	2020	
Dominica	Roseau	Embassy	2020	
Grenada	St. George's	Embassy	2020	
Saint Kitts and Nevis	Basseterre	Embassy	2020	
Venezuela	Ciudad Guayana	Consulate	2020	
Venezuela	Puerto Ayacucho	Vice-Consulate	2020	

=== Asia ===
Host country	Host city	Mission	Year closed	Ref.
Republic of China (Taiwan)	Taipei	Embassy	1975	
Portugal	Macau	Consulate [sic]	1886	
South Vietnam	Saigon	Embassy	1970	

=== Europe ===
Host country	Host city	Mission	Year closed	Ref.
Baden	Baden	Legation	1871	
Bavaria	Munich	Legation	1871	
East Germany	East Berlin	Embassy (Note: The Embassy to East Germany was closed in 1990 due to the reunification of Germany. The Embassy to West Germany in Bonn became the Embassy to the reunited Germany. In 2000 the Embassy to Germany was transferred from Bonn to Berlin.)	1990	
Mecklenburg, Oldenburg, Schwerin, Strelitz, Bremen, Hamburg, Lübeck Free and Hanseatic Cities	Hamburg	Legation	1867	
Hanover	Hanover	Legation	1867	
Hesse	Wiesbaden	Legation	1873	
Netherlands	Rotterdam	Consulate-General	2019	
Parma	Parma	Legation	1851	
Prussia	Berlin	Legation (Note: The Kingdom of Prussia ceased to exist independently in 1871. This year, upon the Proclamation of the German Empire, the legation to the Kingdom became the legation to the Empire.)	1871	
Sardinia	Cagliari / Turin	Legation	1862	
Saxony	Dresden	Legation	1834	
Tuscany	Florence	Legation	1866	
Two Sicilies	Palermo	Legation	1861	

== Missions to open ==
Receiving country	Host city	Mission	Ref.
Libya	Tripoli	Embassy	
Luxembourg	Luxembourg City	Embassy	
Peru	Cusco	Vice-Consulate	
Sierra Leone	Freetown	Embassy	

== See also ==
- Foreign relations of Brazil
- List of diplomatic missions in Brazil
- Ministry of Foreign Affairs of Brazil
- Visa policy of Brazil
