= Ministry of Foreign Affairs (Brazil) =

Ministry of Brazil

- Ministério das Relações Exteriores
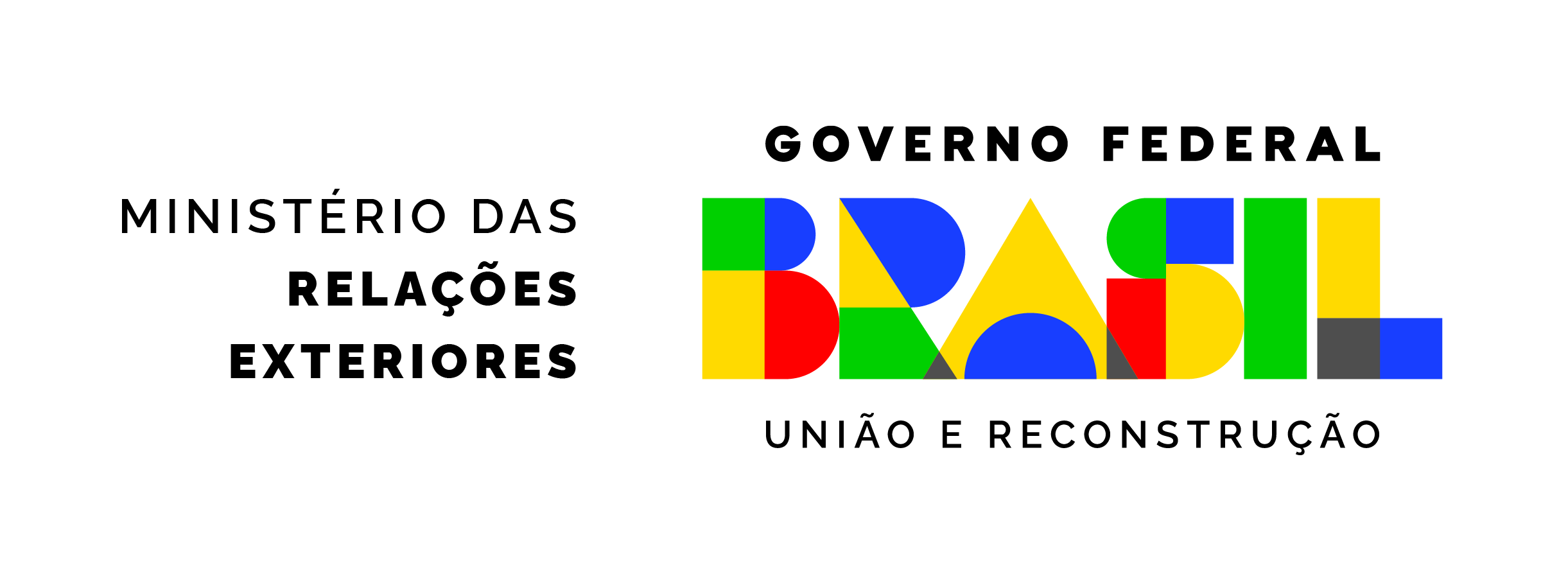

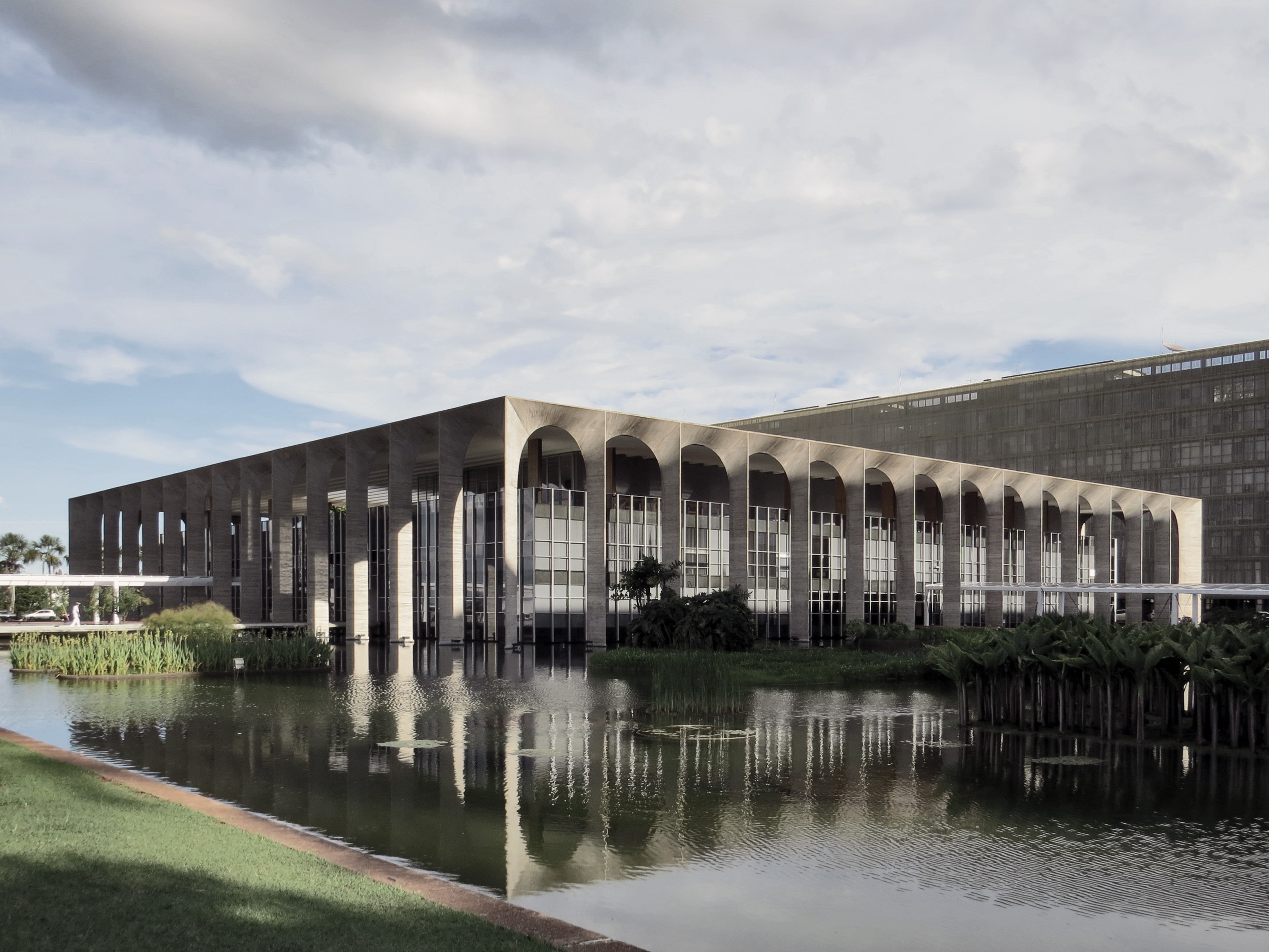
- Itamaraty Palace

Agency overview
- Formed: 13 November 1823
- Type: Ministry
- Headquarters: Itamaraty Palace; Esplanada dos Ministérios, Bloco H Brasília–DF; 15°48′36″S 47°52′12″W
- Annual budget: BRL 2.3 billion (2022)
- Minister responsible: Mauro Vieira, Minister of Foreign Affairs
- Agency executive: Maria Laura da Rocha, Secretary-General of Foreign Affairs
- Child agencies: Rio Branco Institute; Alexandre de Gusmão Foundation
- Website: gov.br/mre/en

The Ministry of Foreign Affairs (MRE; Portuguese: Ministério das Relações Exteriores, lit. 'Ministry of External Relations') conducts Brazil's foreign relations with other countries. It is commonly referred to in Brazilian media and diplomatic jargon as Itamaraty, after the palace which houses the ministry (originally in Rio de Janeiro, and currently in a second location which also bears this name in Brasília). Since 1 January 2023, the minister responsible is Mauro Vieira.

The Ministry of Foreign Affairs operates the Rio Branco Institute and the Alexandre de Gusmão Foundation.

== History ==
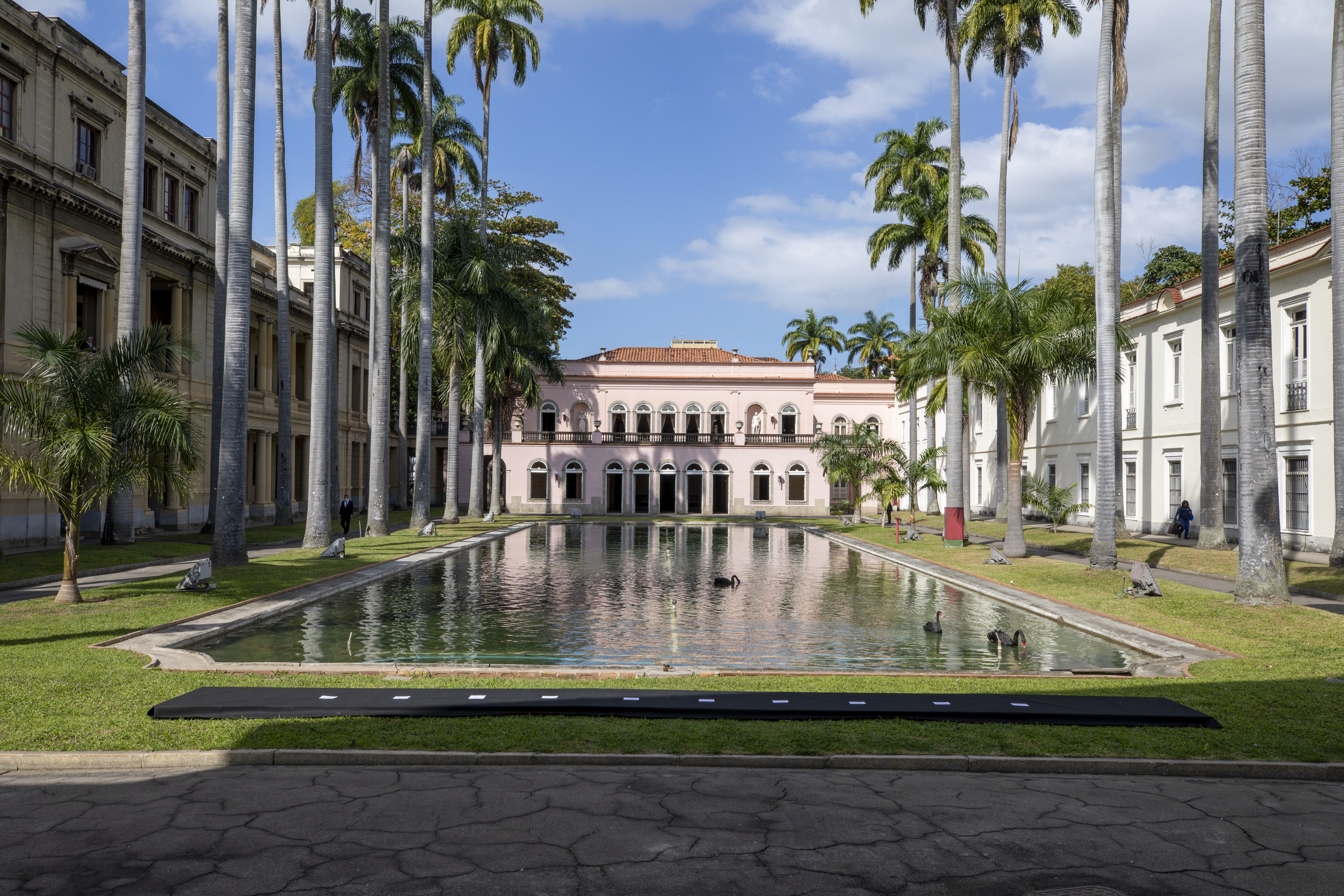
The original Itamaraty Palace in Rio de Janeiro, former headquarters and current regional office of the Ministry of Foreign Affairs of Brazil

There were three relevant moments that defined the Ministry of Foreign Affairs as the institution that would later be established. The first was the signature of the 1750 Spanish–Portuguese treaty, which re-established the borders set in the Treaty of Tordesillas. This moment was not a foreign issue policy of Brazil per se, but was instead a pursuit of interests by the Portuguese in their largest colony. There was, however, a notable Brazilian in the diplomatic corps, Alexandre de Gusmão, who directed the Portuguese foreign policy of trying to separate the Americas from the subject of European successions. The height of Gusmão's diplomatic effort was the signing of the Treaty of Madrid of 1750, in which territorial issues in South America were resolved.

The second relevant historic moment was the transfer of the Portuguese Court to Brazil in 1808 as a result of the Napoleonic Wars, when the capital of the Portuguese Empire and all its bureaucracy were transferred to Rio de Janeiro. The transfer of the Portuguese Court heavily influenced the Brazilian institutions that would later form.

Finally, there was the participation of the Ministry of Foreign Affairs in the process of recognizing Brazilian independence. This moment's relevance surpassed the creation of Brazilian diplomatic institutions and for the first time tested the negotiation skills of Emperor Peter I's diplomatic corps, which achieved recognition from every world power.

From that moment on and since its inception in 1822, Itamaraty has defined some of its basic principles of action such as the peaceful resolution of principles and non-intervention. With the conclusion of World War II and the creation of the United Nations in 1945 the ministry consolidated Brazil's presence in international forums.

Notable diplomats in the history of Itamaraty include the Viscount of Uruguay, the Baron of Rio Branco and Osvaldo Aranha.

== Main mission ==
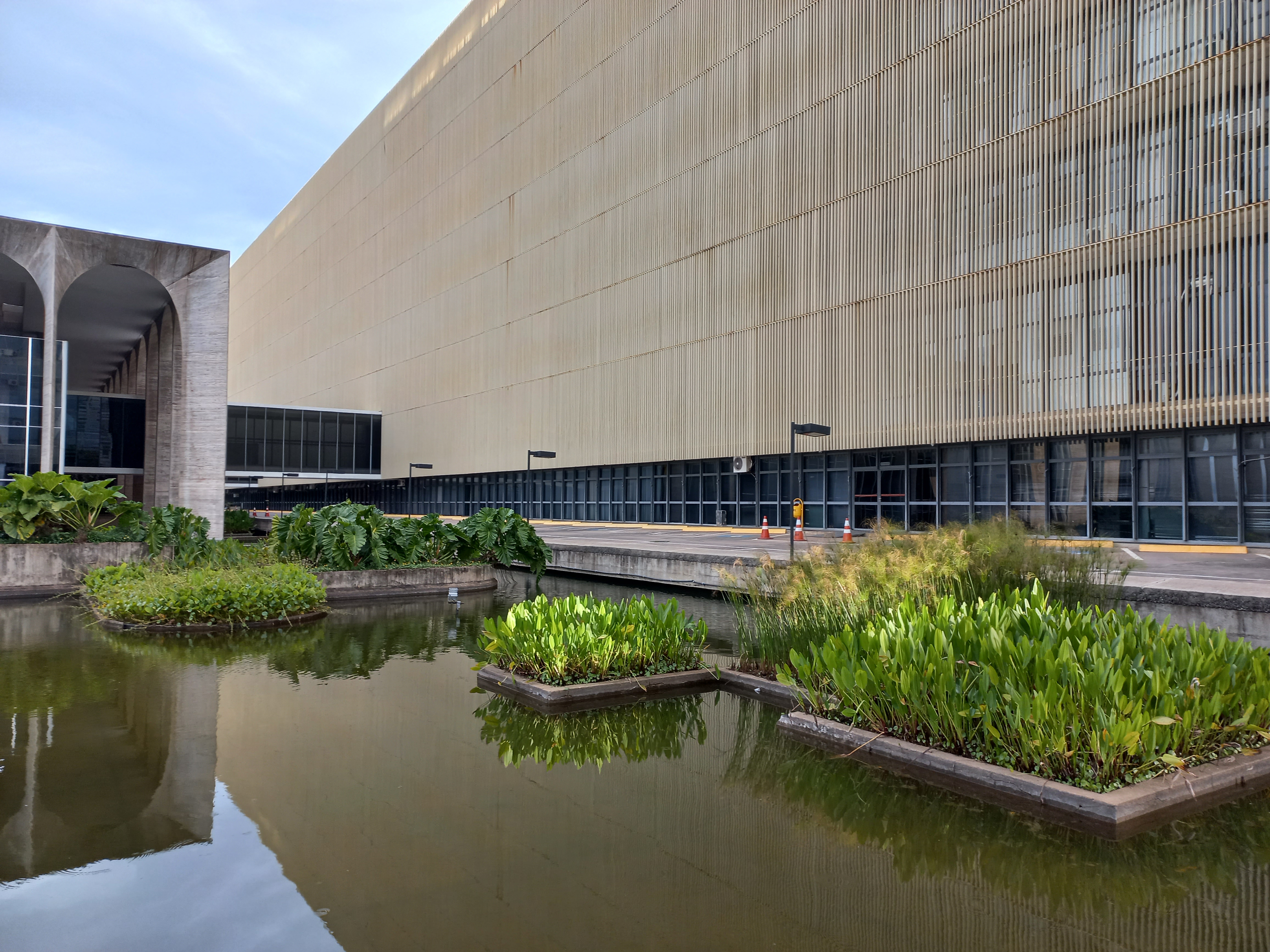
Itamaraty Palace building in Brasília

The main mission of Brazilian diplomatic embassies and consulates abroad is to promote the country's interests, provide assistance to Brazilian citizens and support the activities of Brazilian companies in foreign markets.

== Diplomatic missions ==
Permanent diplomatic missions are meant to carry out representation, negotiation and information activities, as well as the protection of Brazilian interests with governments of other states and international organizations.

As of February of 2026, Brazil's diplomatic network consist of 228 overseas missions:

- 136 embassies
- 57 consulates-general
- 10 consulates
- 10 vice-consulates
- 12 missions or delegations
- 3 commercial or representative offices

== Structure ==
- Office of the Minister of Foreign Affairs
- General Secretariat for Foreign Affairs
- Secretariat for Latin America and the Caribbean
  - Department of Regional Integration
  - Department of Mexico, Central America and the Caribbean
  - Department of South America
  - Department of Mercosur
- Secretariat for Europe and North America
  - Department of Europe
  - Department of North America
- Secretariat for Africa and the Middle East
  - Department of Africa
  - Department of the Middle East
- Secretariat for Asia and the Pacific
  - Department of China, Russia and Central Asia
  - Department of India, South and Southeast Asia
  - Department of Japan, Korean Peninsula and Pacific
- Secretariat for Economic and Financial Affairs
  - Department of Commercial Policy
  - Department of Economic Policy, Finance and Services
- Secretariat for Multilateral Political Affairs
  - Department of Strategic Affairs, Defense and Disarmament
  - Department of International Organizations
  - Department of Human Rights and Social Issues
- Secretariat for Trade Promotion, Science, Technology, Innovation and Culture
  - Department of Commercial Promotion, Investments and Agriculture
  - Department of Science, Technology, Innovation and Intellectual Property
  - Brazilian Cultural Center
- Secretariat for Brazilian Communities Abroad and Consular and Legal Affairs
  - Department of Brazilian Communities Abroad and Consular Affairs
  - Department of Immigration and Judicial Cooperation
- Secretariat for Climate, Energy and Environment
  - Department of Environmental Affairs
  - Department of Climate
  - Department of Energy
- Secretariat for Administrative Management
  - Department of Administration
  - Department of Technology and Management of Information
  - Department of External Service
- Rio Branco Institute

== See also ==
- ApexBrasil
- List of ministers of foreign affairs of Brazil
- Mercosur
- Secretary General of Foreign Affairs of Brazil
- Federal institutions of Brazil
- Brazilian diplomatic missions
- Foreign relations of Brazil
- Community of Portuguese Language Countries
- List of diplomatic missions in Brazil
- Visa requirements for Brazilian citizens
