= Itamaraty Palace (Rio de Janeiro) =

Historic building in Rio de Janeiro, Brazil

- Palácio do Itamaraty
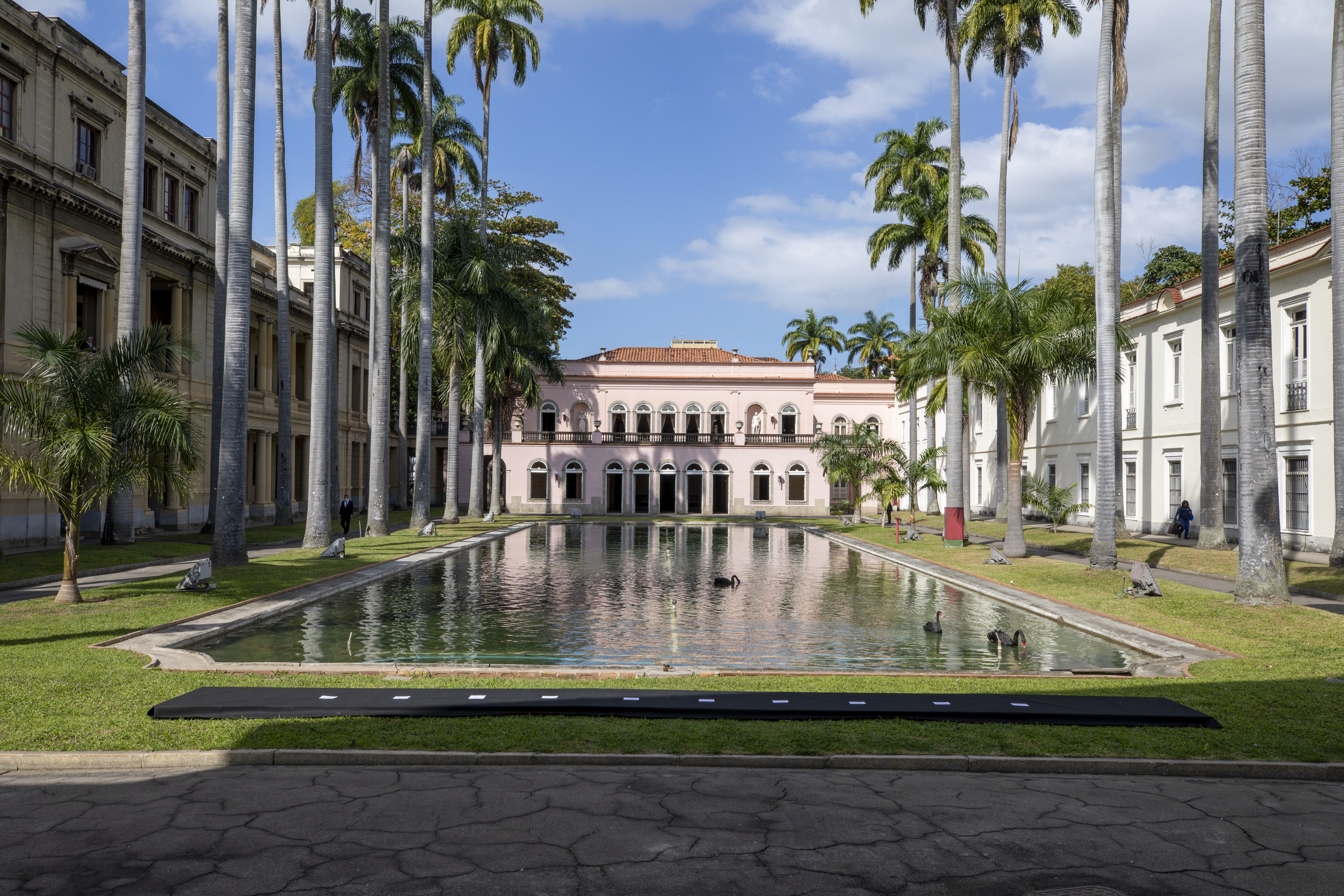
- Garden and water mirror of the Itamaraty Palace
- Interactive map of the Itamaraty Palace area

General information
- Architectural style: Neoclassical and eclectic
- Location: Rio de Janeiro, Rio de Janeiro; Brazil
- Coordinates: 22°54′11″S 43°11′17″W
- Construction started: 1851
- Construction stopped: 1855; 171 years ago
- Client: Francisco José da Rocha Leão, Count of Itamarati

Design and construction
- Architect: José Maria Jacinto Rebelo

National Historic Heritage of Brazil

The Itamaraty Palace (Portuguese: Palácio do Itamaraty) is a 19th-century building of great historical and artistic value located in the city of Rio de Janeiro, Brazil.

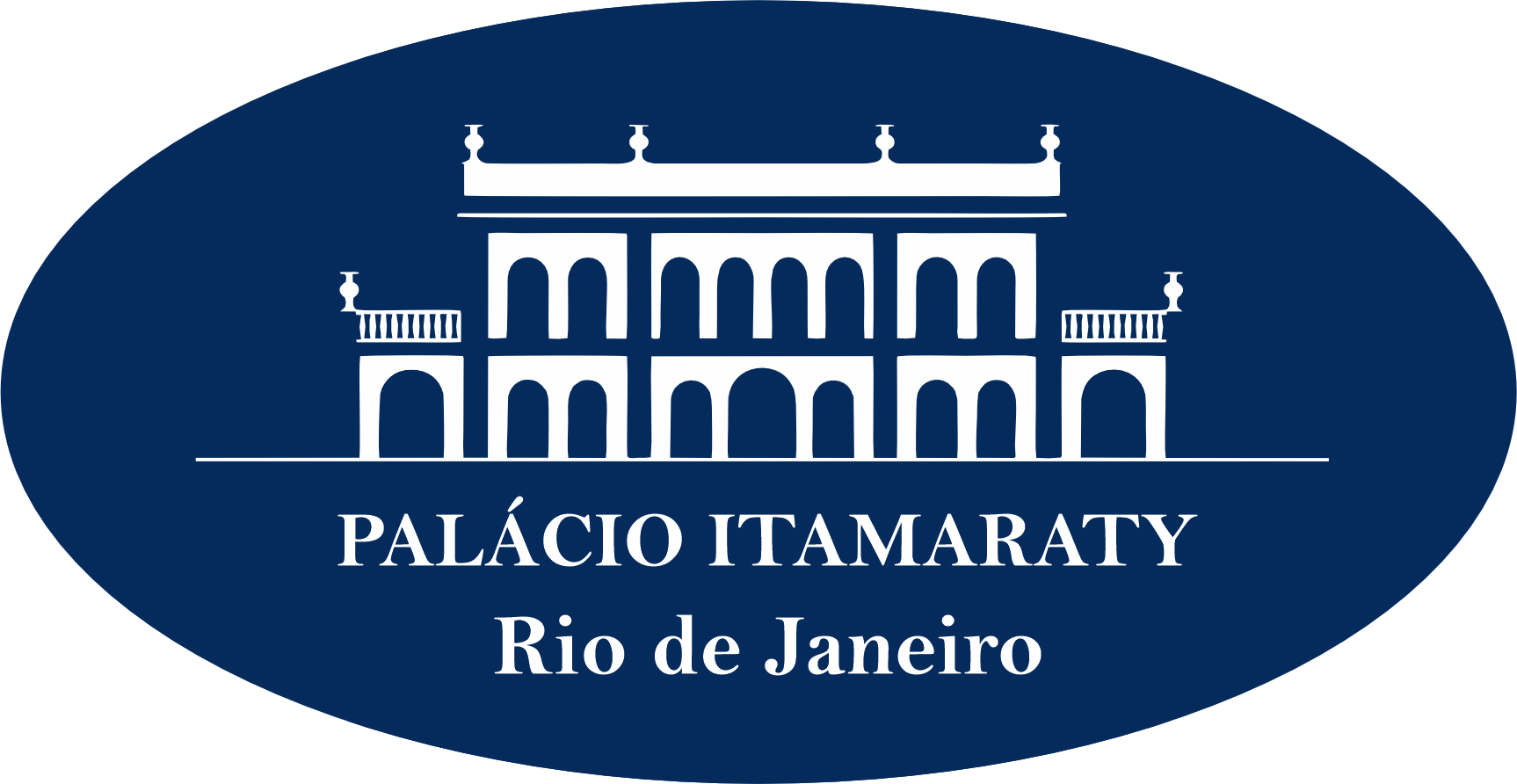
Itamaraty Palace logo.

The palace was a noble residence, the seat of the Republican Government (1889–1898) and of the Ministry of Foreign Affairs (1899–1970). It currently serves as the headquarters of the MRE's Representative Office in Rio de Janeiro, of the Alexandre de Gusmão Foundation's Center for History and Diplomatic Documentation and of the Historical and Diplomatic Museum, as well as holding the collections of the Historical Archive and the Map Library.

== Meaning of the name ==
According to Navarro, the language of origin and the meaning of the name are uncertain. There are many suggested etymologies: "river of small stones", from the combination of itá (stone), mirim (small) and ty (river); "stream between loose stones", from ita-marã-ty; white stone, from itá-moroti; "very hard and smooth wood", from itamará or ytamirá + ti or -tim; river of crystals, itá'mberá'ty or y + ita vera (clear stone, crystal) + tĩ or t'y: river), etc.

== History ==
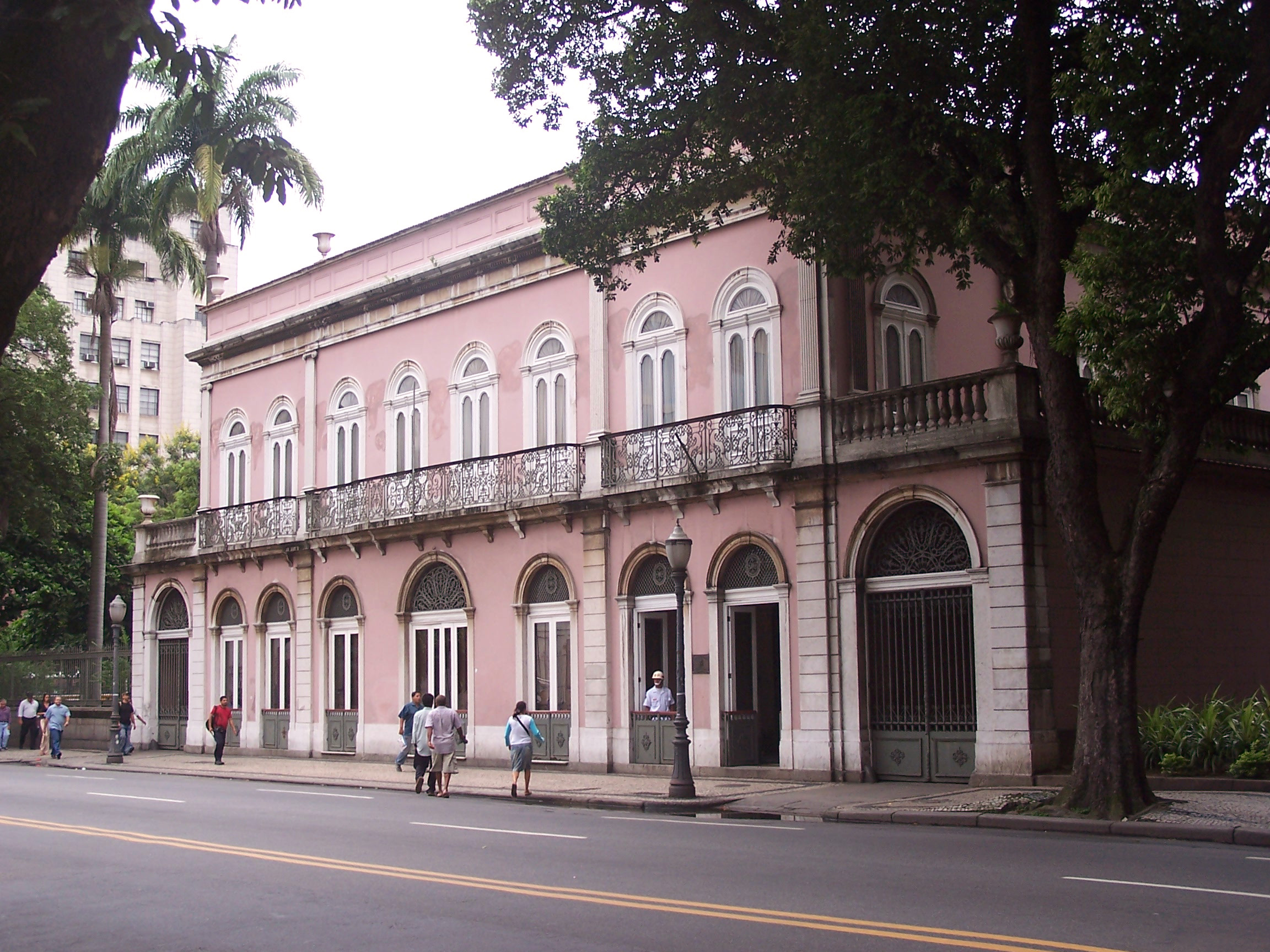
Neoclassical facade (c. 1855) of the Itamaraty Palace.

The Itamaraty Palace was built between 1851 and 1855 by Francisco José da Rocha Leão, Count of Itamaraty, son of the first Baron of Itamaraty. His family credited the palace's floor plan to two anonymous French architects, but the design of the main building is officially listed as being by the Brazilian José Maria Jacinto Rebelo, a disciple of Grandjean de Montigny and one of the main architects active in the period.

Strictly symmetrical, the neoclassical palace has noble proportions, typical of Jacinto Rabelo's work. At the back of the main building, a water mirror was built, flanked by imperial palm trees. Some structures around the courtyard were renovated between 1927 and 1930 by the French architect Joseph Gire, the Scotsman Robert Prentice and the Austrian Anton Floderer, in a neoclassical Beaux-Arts style.

Through a project that won a competition promoted by the Brazilian Institute of Architects, Robert Prentice and Anton Floderer designed the library, which was built between 1928 and 1930 to store the archives and maps donated to the government by the Baron of Rio Branco. Joseph Gire designed the architrave, the access galleries to the halls and alterations to the facade.

=== Headquarters of the Ministry of Foreign Affairs ===
The building was the seat of the republican government from 1889 to 1898 and the headquarters of the Ministry of Foreign Affairs (MRE) from 1899 to 1970. The relationship established between Brazilian diplomacy and the palace they occupied for seven decades led to the term Itamaraty becoming the official cognomen of the ministry.

Today, the palace is the representative office of the Ministry of Foreign Affairs in Rio de Janeiro. Part of the building houses the large collections of the Historical and Diplomatic Museum, the Historical Archives and the Map Library. It also contains the United Nations (UN) Information Office in Brazil and the Alexandre de Gusmão Foundation's Center for History and Diplomatic Documentation.

The palace was the eighth building to be listed as a historical monument in Brazil in 1938.

== See also ==
- Itamaraty Palace
- Guanabara Palace
- Laranjeiras Palace
