= Commercial Office of Brazil, Taipei =

Commercial Office of Brazil in Taipei

Agency overview
- Jurisdiction: Taiwan
- Headquarters: Shilin, Taipei, Taiwan; 25°6′22.07″N 121°31′23.52″E
- Agency executive: Luís Cláudio Villafañe Gomes Santos, Representative
- Website: Escritório Comercial do Brasil em Taipé

The Commercial Office of Brazil in Taipei (Portuguese: Escritório Comercial do Brasil em Taipé) (Chinese: 巴西駐台商務辦事處) represents interests of Brazil in Taiwan in the absence of formal diplomatic relations, functioning as a de facto embassy. Its counterpart in Brazil is the Taipei Economic and Cultural Office in Brazil in Brasília.

== See also ==
- Brazil–Taiwan relations
- List of diplomatic missions in Taiwan
- List of diplomatic missions of Brazil
