= Itamaraty Palace =

- Palácio Itamaraty
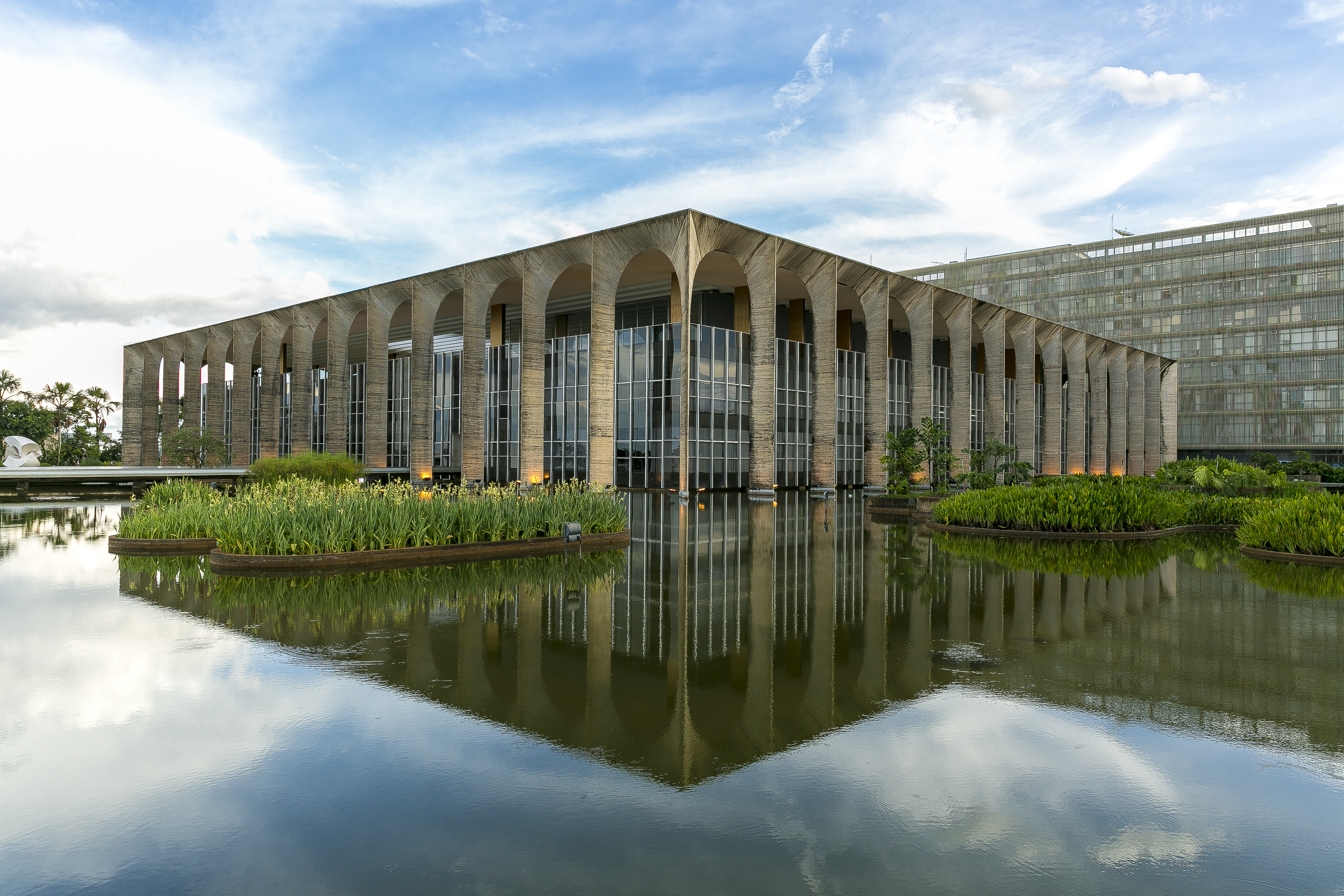
- Interactive map of the Itamaraty Palace area

General information
- Architectural style: Modernist
- Location: Monumental Axis, Bloco H, Brasília, Federal District, Brazil
- Coordinates: 15.800556°S 47.867222°W
- Current tenants: Ministry of Foreign Affairs
- Year built: 1960–1970
- Inaugurated: 20 April 1970
- Client: Brazilian government
- Owner: Brazilian government

Height
- Height: 15 m (49 ft)

Dimensions
- Diameter: 84 m (276 ft) × 84 m (276 ft)

Technical details
- Floor count: 3

Design and construction
- Architect: Oscar Niemeyer
- Engineer: Joaquim Cardozo

National Historic Heritage of Brazil
- Designated: 2007
- Reference no.: 1550

The Itamaraty Palace (Portuguese: Palácio Itamaraty), also known as the Palace of the Arches (Palácio dos Arcos), is the headquarters of the Ministry of Foreign Affairs of Brazil. It is located in the national capital of Brasília. The building was designed by architect Oscar Niemeyer and inaugurated on April 21, 1970. It is located to the east of the National Congress building along the Ministries Esplanade, near the Praça dos Três Poderes (Three Powers Plaza). One of its most iconic features is the gravity defying spiral interior staircase.

The project had the collaboration of legendary Brazilian landscape designer Roberto Burle Marx who created all of the Palace's gardens.

In Brazil, Itamaraty is generally used as a metonymy for the Ministry of Foreign Affairs. The name stems from that of the palace in Rio de Janeiro which was the headquarters of the ministry before the Brazilian capital and government were moved to Brasília.

== History ==
Itamaraty Palace is the headquarters of the Ministry of Foreign Affairs of Brazil. It is located in the national capital of Brasília, to the east of the National Congress building along the Ministries Esplanade, near the Praça dos Três Poderes. It was building in 1969 and 1979, and opened on April 21, 1970.

In 2007, the building was listed on the National Historic Heritage of Brazil.

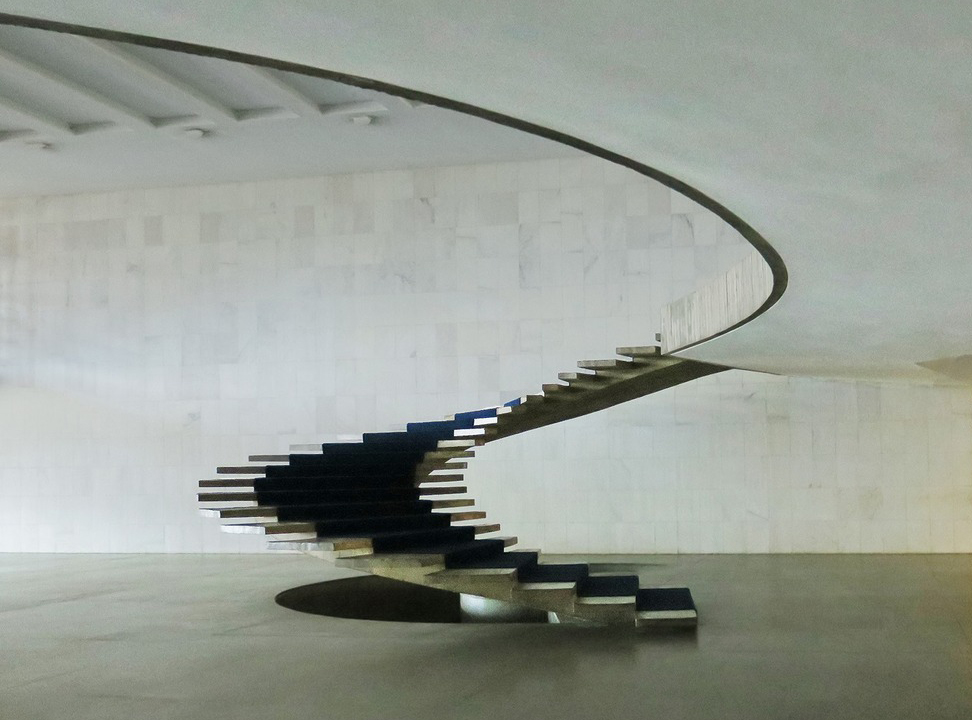
Spiral staircase at Itamaraty Palace

== Palácio dos Arcos ==
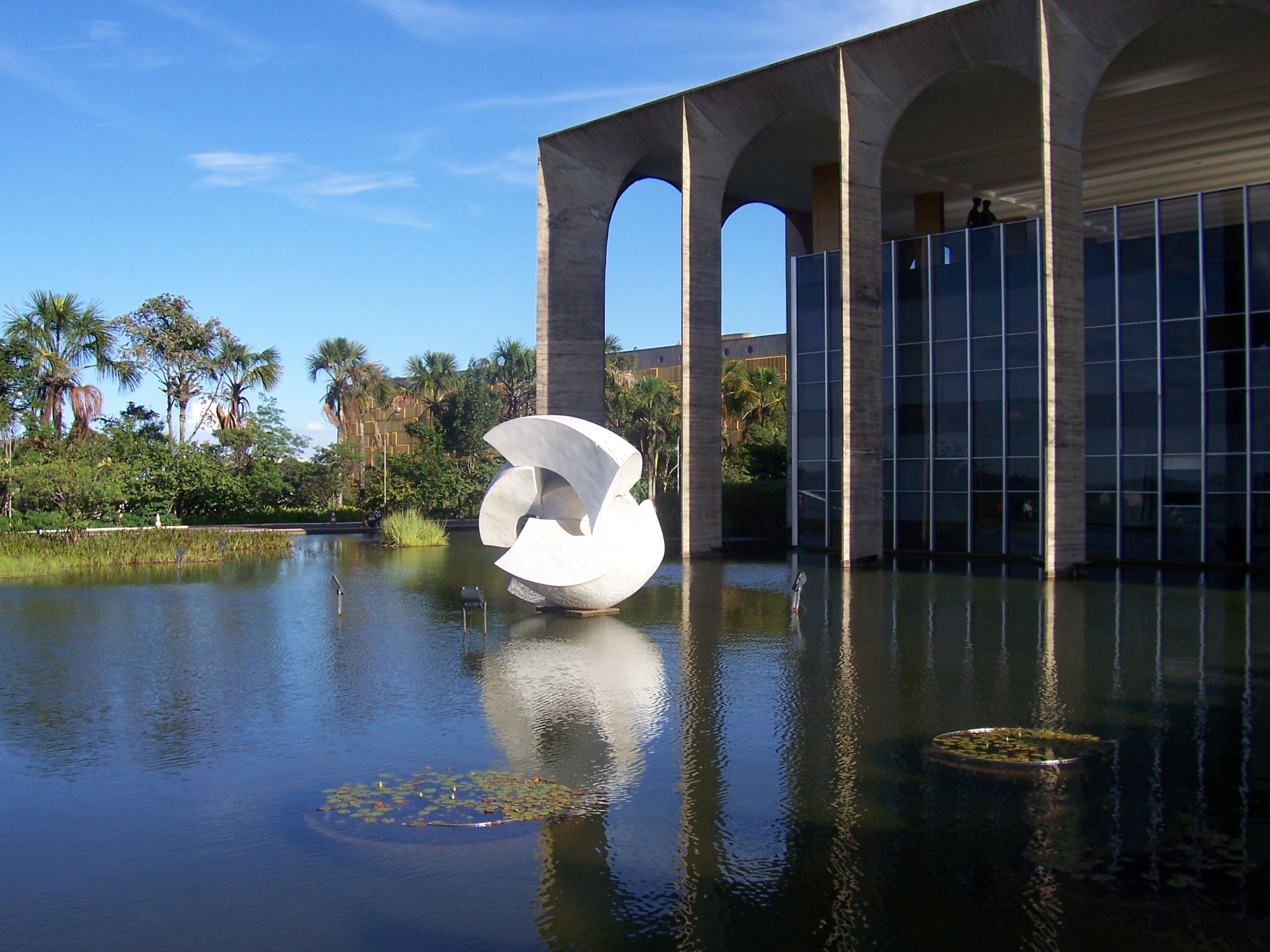
Meteoro, a sculpture designed by Bruno Giorgi

"Palácio dos Arcos" was the first name given to the building, because of the arches on its facade. However, the traditional name "Itamaraty", inherited from the name of the ministry's former headquarters in Rio de Janeiro, proved stronger, and the palace continued to be called Palácio Itamaraty, with only the word "do" removed from "Palácio do Itamaraty".

Its interior contains works by artists such as Athos Bulcão, Candido Portinari, Pedro Américo, Alfredo Volpi, Maria Martins, Djanira, Jean-Baptiste Debret, Rubem Valentim, Emanoel Araújo, Mary Vieira, Franz Weissmann, Frans Krajcberg, Marianne Peretti, Sérgio de Camargo, Luiza Miller, Madeleine Colaço, Concessa Colaço, Tomie Ohtake, Manabu Mabe, Fayga Ostrower, Ione Saldanha, Iberê Camargo, Maria Leontina, Norberto Nicola, Victor Brecheret, Arcangelo Ianelli, and Lasar Segall, among others.

The palace's interior and exterior landscape design is by Roberto Burle Marx. In front of the building, above the reflecting pool, stands Meteoro, a sculpture by Bruno Giorgi."Niemeyer é homenageado no Itamaraty, cujo prédio foi projetado por ele". Correio Braziliense (in Brazilian Portuguese). 6 December 2012."Roteiro cívico". Governo do Distrito Federal (in Brazilian Portuguese).

The palace's cornerstone was laid by president Juscelino Kubitschek on 12 September 1960. However, because of the technical difficulties involved in carrying out the project's innovations, it was not officially completed and inaugurated until 20 April 1970, by president Emílio Garrastazu Médici and the minister of foreign affairs, ambassador Mário Gibson Barbosa.

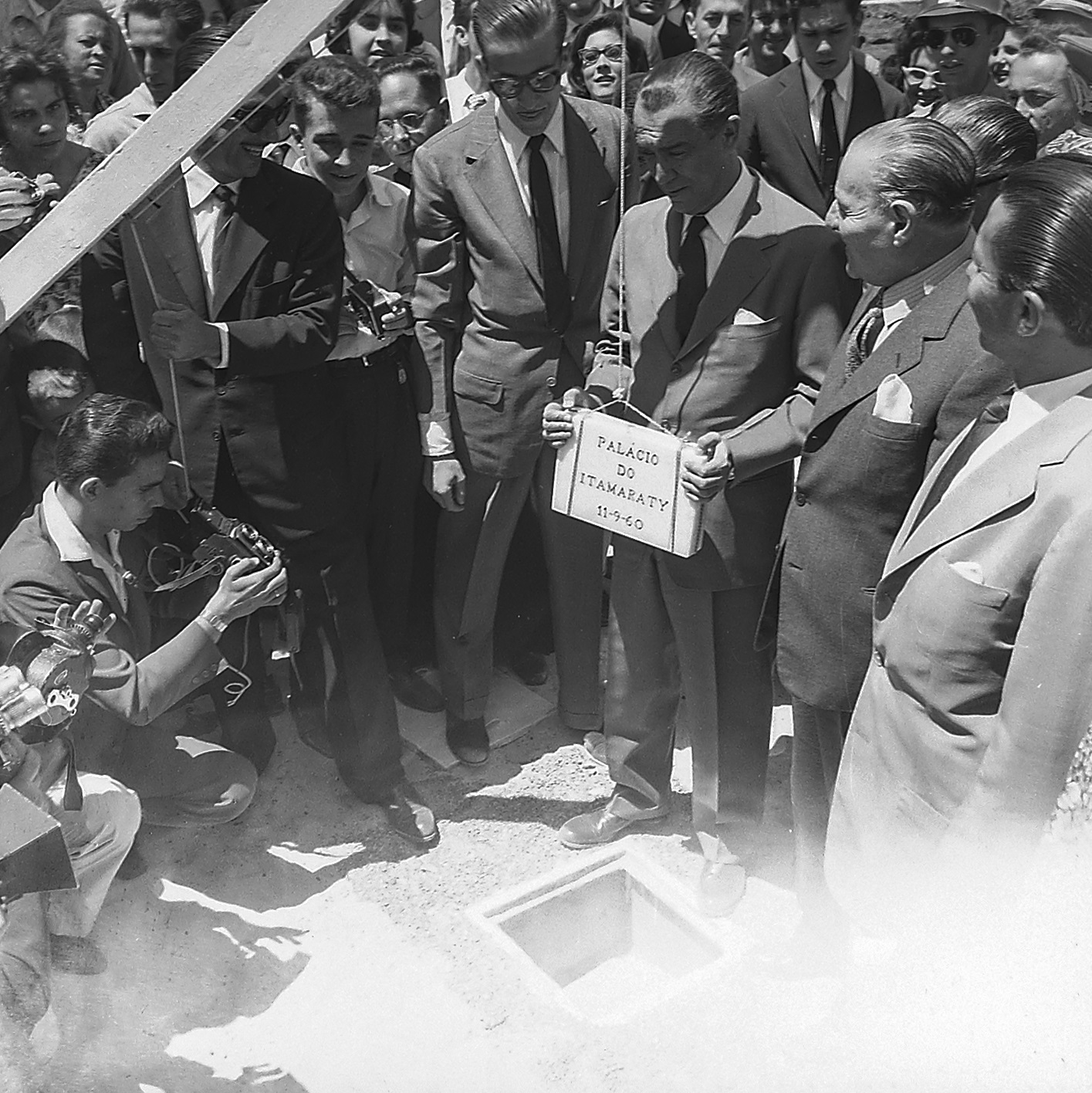
Juscelino Kubitschek lays the cornerstone of the Ministry of Foreign Affairs in Brasília on 11 September 1960

The palace is the place where the head of state receives other heads of state and foreign authorities, making it a ceremonial space in the fullest sense. It has received notable visitors, including Pelé, at its inauguration in 1970, and heads of state such as Queen Elizabeth II of the United Kingdom, in 1968, as well as United States presidents Ronald Reagan, in 1982, and Barack Obama, in 2011.

During the 20 June 2013 protest in Brasília, which called for various changes from the federal government, windows in the building were broken with stones, some walls were graffitied, and part of the façade was set on fire by a Molotov cocktail thrown by demonstrators.

== Architecture ==
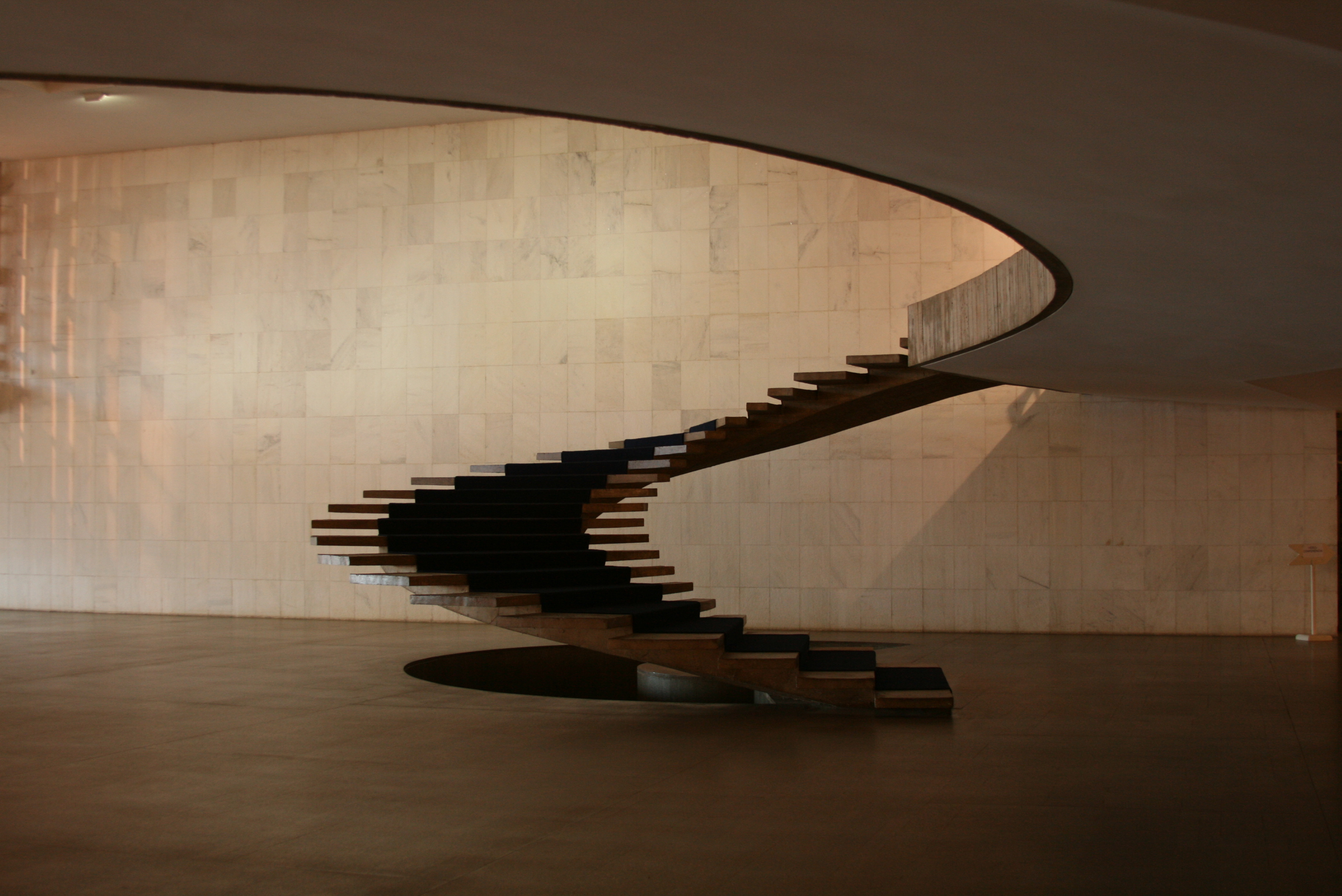
Helical staircase in the hall of Palácio Itamaraty

The headquarters of the Ministry of Foreign Affairs required more than a ceremonial space, since its bureaucratic functions also had to be carried out effectively. For that reason, Niemeyer had strong technical support and a carefully developed program of requirements. The architect designed a lower, square-plan building for protocol functions, the palace itself, set against a taller and narrower building for day-to-day administrative work, Annex I. Niemeyer also returned to the theme of Brasília's palaces, namely a glass box held between two concrete slabs with a colonnade.

The character of the building, however, was different, and to emphasize that difference he altered the scheme. The "dipteral" temple, with columns on two sides, gave way to the "peripteral" one, with columns on all sides. The upper slab was raised and the lower slab touched the reflecting pool. The emblematic columns were reserved for the Executive, in the Palácio do Planalto, and the Judiciary, in the Supreme Federal Court. The defining mark of Itamaraty would instead be the classical and noble round arch.

From a technical point of view, the building consists of two independent structures, one for the glass box and another for the arcades. From an aesthetic point of view, Niemeyer used many devices, from the optical correction of the arcades to the design of the floor. Its striking clear span was made possible by the structural calculations of Joaquim Cardozo, the engineer behind the main works of Niemeyer's career.

The executive design was developed by the architect Milton Ramos.

== Collection ==
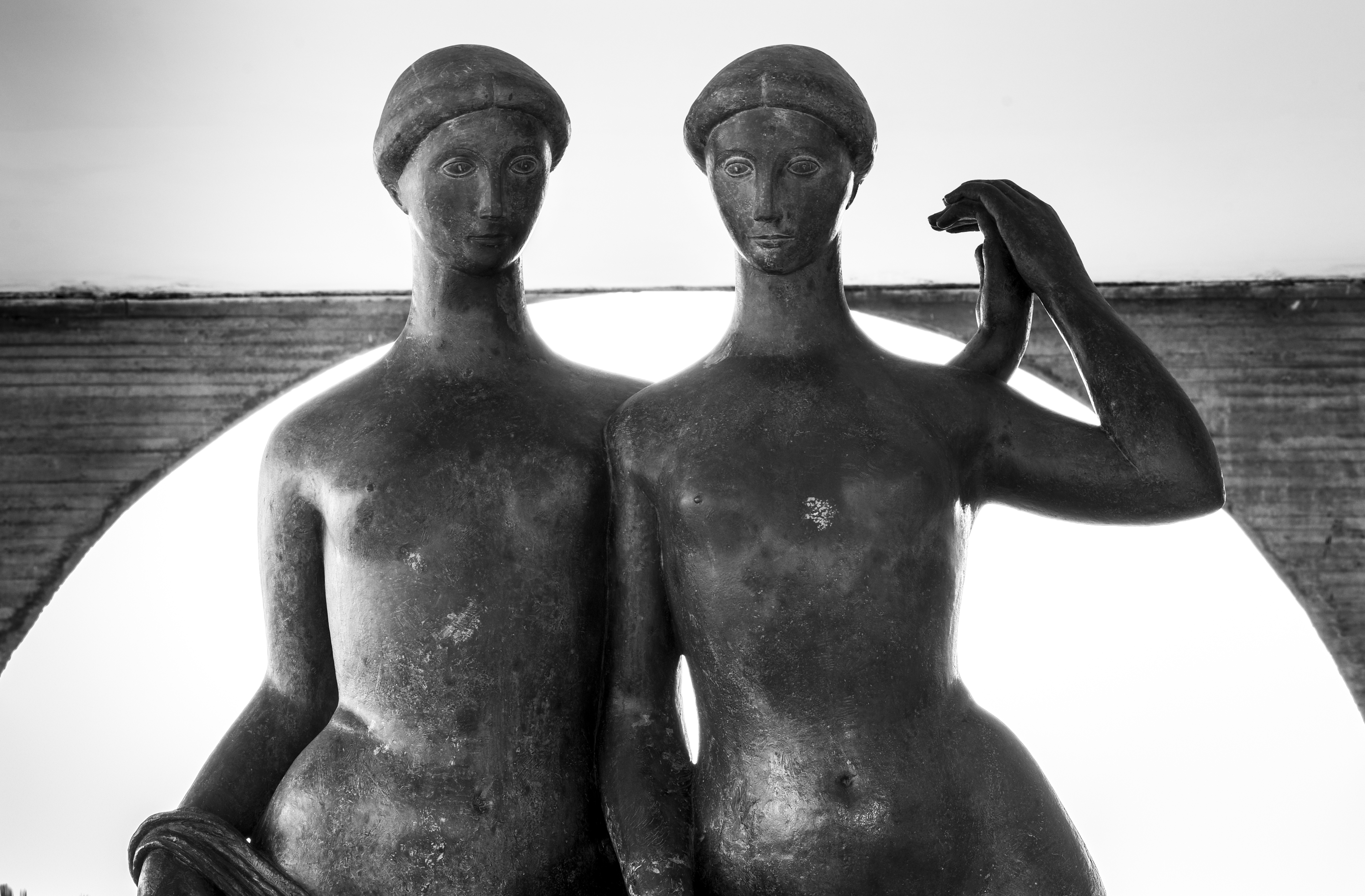
Detail of Duas Amigas, by Alfredo Ceschiatti, 1967, cast bronze, 255 × 127 × 58 cm

The palace's collection brings together old and modern elements, and its decoration remains almost the same as it was at the time of its official inauguration in 1970. Its furniture includes colonial, Baroque and neoclassical pieces, works from the early Brazilian furniture industry, and icons from the 1980s. In Itamaraty's offices, furniture by Sérgio Rodrigues and Bernardo Figueiredo is paired with Persian rugs purchased in Beirut and London. Historic furniture, paintings and tapestries brought from the original palace in Rio de Janeiro complete the decoration.

During the 50th anniversary of Palácio Itamaraty, members of the Institute of Arts of the University of Brasília (UnB) carried out a detailed survey of the palace's art collection, cataloguing over 580 works of art.

Prints alone account for 450 of those works, many of them forming complete collections by Brazilian artists. Paintings, collages and drawings total 92 works. Furniture was not included in the count, although the Bahia and Arcos chairs alone, two icons of Brazilian design, number more than 90. Both were designed by the then young architect Bernardo Figueiredo. The specialists also examined works displayed in the offices of diplomats and advisers, since these rooms contained works, mostly purchased with public money, that had never been exhibited to the public. Publicizing these works was one of the aims of the project.

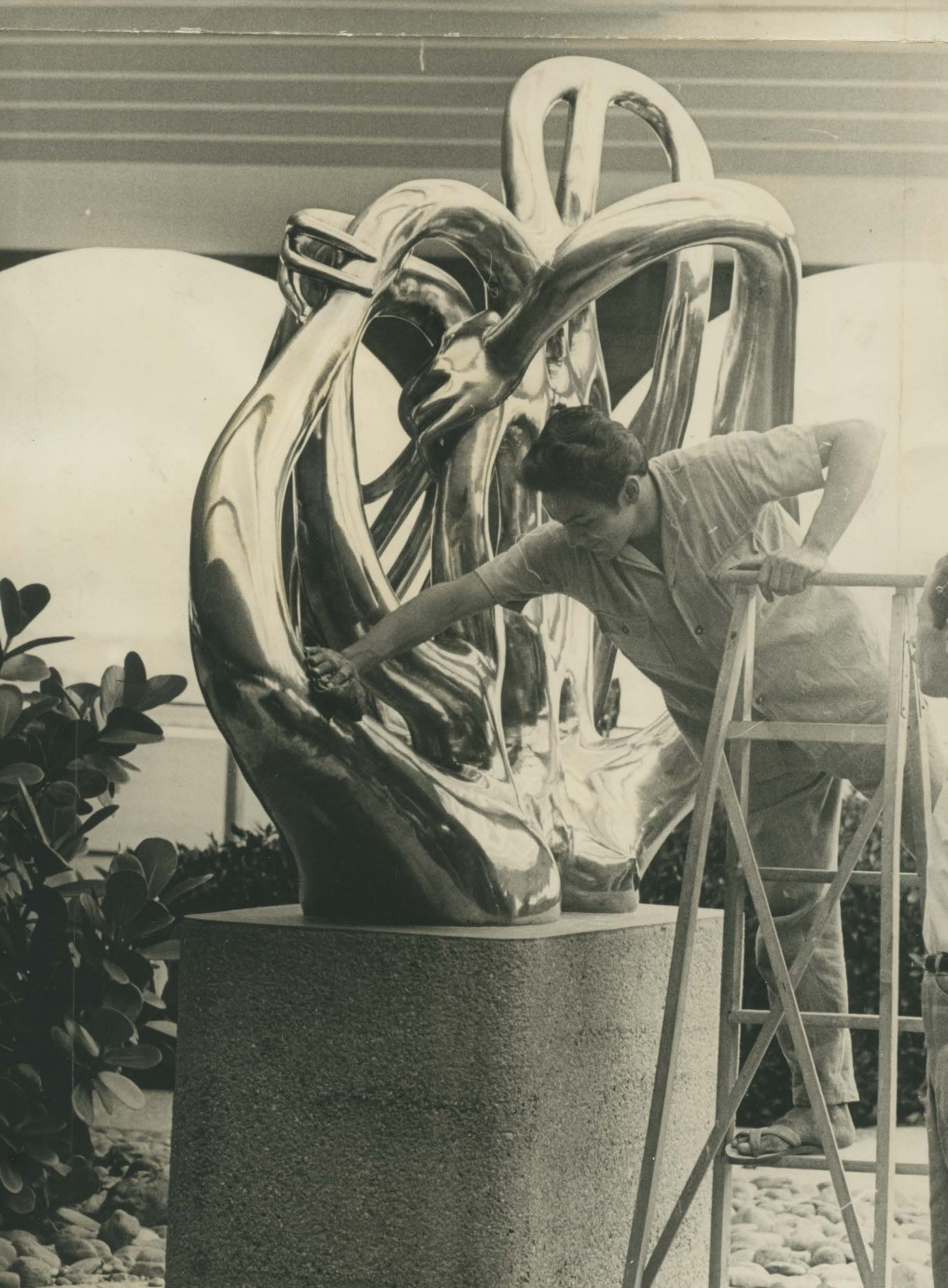
Canto da Noite, by Maria Martins

In another initiative connected with the 50th anniversary, the Federal Institute of Brasília (IFB) delivered restored pieces by the designer and architect Sérgio Rodrigues (1927–2014) to Itamaraty. The Ministry of Foreign Affairs (MRE) holds the largest number of his works.

In Itamaraty's Noble Hall, also known as the Upper Garden, are the works Canto da Noite and Duas Amigas, sculptures by Maria Martins and Alfredo Ceschiatti, respectively.

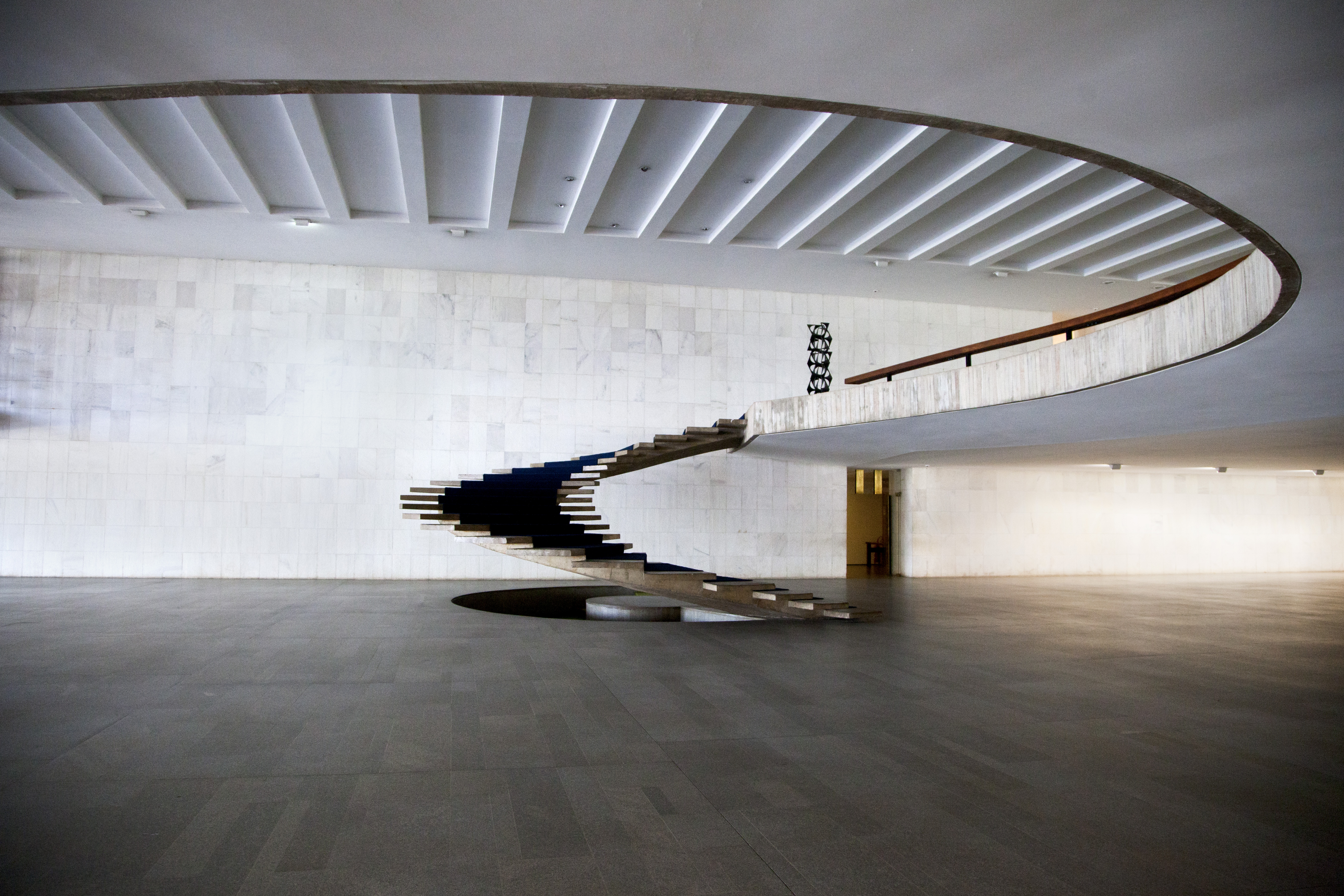
Helical staircase

== Annexes ==
"Annex I", the administrative block, was named in 2018 after Brazil's first female diplomat, Maria José de Castro Rebello Mendes. "Annex II", also designed by Niemeyer between 1974 and 1975, is also known as the "wedding cake" because of its circular shape. Construction began in 1979 and was completed in 1986.

== See also ==
- Itamaraty Palace (Rio de Janeiro), former headquarters of Brazil's Ministry of Foreign Affairs
- Monumental Axis, main civic axis of Brasília, where Palácio Itamaraty is located
- Praça dos Três Poderes, nearby civic plaza at the center of Brazil's federal government
- List of Oscar Niemeyer works, overview of major works by the architect who designed Palácio Itamaraty
- Architecture of Brazil, broader context for Brazilian modernist architecture
