= Taipei Economic and Cultural Office, Brasília =

De facto embassy of Taiwan in Brasília

- (Taiwan) 駐巴西台北經濟文化辦事處; Taipei Economic and Cultural Office in Brazil; Escritório Econômico e Cultural de Taipei no Brasil

Agency overview
- Jurisdiction: Brazil
- Headquarters: Brasília, Brazil
- Agency executive: Benito Liao, Representative
- Website: Escritório Econômico e Cultural de Taipei no Brasil

The Taipei Economic and Cultural Office in Brazil (Chinese: 駐巴西台北經濟文化辦事處) (Portuguese: Escritório Econômico e Cultural de Taipei no Brasil) represents the interests of Taiwan in Brazil in the absence of formal diplomatic relations, functioning as a de facto embassy. Its counterpart in Taiwan is the Commercial Office of Brazil to Taipei in Taipei.

There is also a Taipei Economic and Cultural Office in São Paulo, Brazil's largest city. This was formerly known as the Centro Comercial de Taipei no Brasil. The Office is headed by a Representative, Isaac Tsai.

== Representatives ==
- Shyu Guang-pu
- Isaac Tsai
- Her, Jian-queng
- Chang Tsung-Che
- Diego Wen
- Benito Liao

== See also ==
- Brazil–Taiwan relations
- List of diplomatic missions of Taiwan
- List of diplomatic missions in Brazil
