= List of diplomatic missions in Brazil =

This is a list of diplomatic missions in Brazil. On September 22, 2026 the capital city of Brasília hosted 132 embassies, 1 Apostolic Nunciature, 1 Mission and 1 Economic & Cultural Office. Several other countries have ambassadors accredited to Brazil, with most being resident in Washington, D.C. or in New York City (United Nations).

Honorary consulates are excluded from this listing when an official mission is listed.

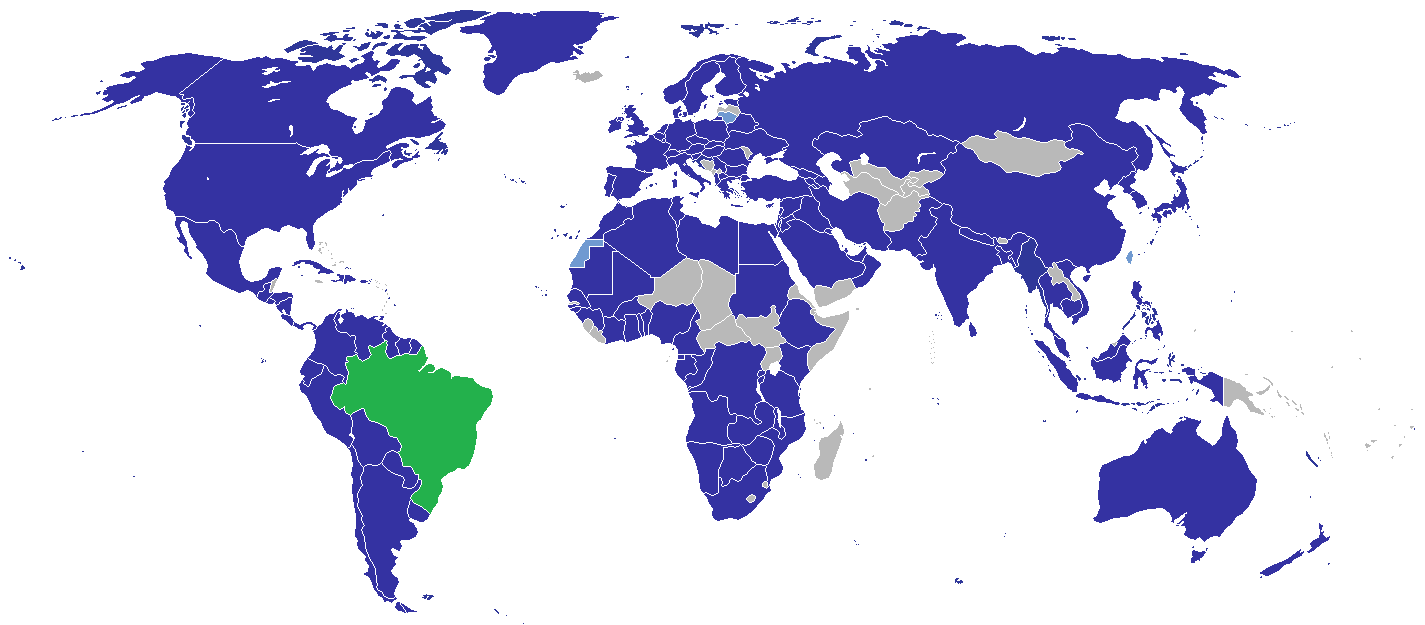
Map of diplomatic missions in Brazil

== Diplomatic missions in Brasília ==
Delegation	Mission type	Image	Website
Albania	Embassy		
Algeria	Embassy		
Angola	Embassy		
Argentina	Embassy		
Armenia	Embassy		
Australia	Embassy		
Austria	Embassy		
Azerbaijan	Embassy		
Bahrain	Embassy		
Bangladesh	Embassy		
Barbados	Embassy		
Belarus	Embassy		
Belgium	Embassy		
Benin	Embassy		
Bolivia	Embassy		
Botswana	Embassy		
Bulgaria	Embassy		
Burkina Faso	Embassy		
Cambodia	Embassy		
Cameroon	Embassy		
Canada	Embassy		
Cape Verde	Embassy		
Chile	Embassy		
China	Embassy		
Colombia	Embassy		
Congo-Brazzaville	Embassy		
Congo-Kinshasa	Embassy		
Costa Rica	Embassy		
Croatia	Embassy		
Cuba	Embassy		
Cyprus	Embassy		
Czech Republic	Embassy		
Denmark	Embassy		
Dominican Republic	Embassy		
Ecuador	Embassy		
Egypt	Embassy		
El Salvador	Embassy		
Equatorial Guinea	Embassy		
Estonia	Embassy		
Ethiopia	Embassy		
Finland	Embassy		
France	Embassy		
Gabon	Embassy		
Georgia	Embassy		
Germany	Embassy		
Ghana	Embassy		
Greece	Embassy		
Guatemala	Embassy		
Guinea	Embassy		
Guinea-Bissau	Embassy		
Guyana	Embassy		
Haiti	Embassy		
Holy See	Apostolic Nunciature		
Honduras	Embassy		
Hungary	Embassy		
India	Embassy		
Indonesia	Embassy		
Iran	Embassy		
Iraq	Embassy		
Ireland	Embassy		
Israel	Embassy		
Italy	Embassy		
Ivory Coast	Embassy		
Japan	Embassy		
Jordan	Embassy		
Kazakhstan	Embassy		
Kenya	Embassy		
Kuwait	Embassy		
Lebanon	Embassy		
Libya	Embassy		
Luxembourg	Embassy		
Malawi	Embassy		
Malaysia	Embassy		
Mali	Embassy		
Malta	Embassy		
Mauritania	Embassy		
Mexico	Embassy		
Morocco	Embassy		
Mozambique	Embassy		
Myanmar	Embassy		
Namibia	Embassy		
Nepal	Embassy		
Netherlands	Embassy		
New Zealand	Embassy		
Nigeria	Embassy		
North Korea	Embassy		
North Macedonia	Embassy		
Norway	Embassy		
Oman	Embassy		
Pakistan	Embassy		
Palestine	Embassy		
Panama	Embassy		
Paraguay	Embassy		
Peru	Embassy		
Philippines	Embassy		
Poland	Embassy		
Portugal	Embassy		
Qatar	Embassy		
Republic of China (Taiwan)	Economic & Cultural Office		
Romania	Embassy		
Russia	Embassy		
Rwanda	Embassy		
Saudi Arabia	Embassy		
Senegal	Embassy		
Serbia	Embassy		
Singapore	Embassy		
Slovakia	Embassy		
Slovenia	Embassy		
South Africa	Embassy		
South Korea	Embassy		
Sovereign Order of Malta	Embassy		
Spain	Embassy		
Sri Lanka	Embassy		
Sudan	Embassy		
Suriname	Embassy		
Sweden	Embassy		
Switzerland	Embassy		
Syria	Embassy		
Tanzania	Embassy		
Thailand	Embassy		
Timor-Leste	Embassy		
Togo	Embassy		
Trinidad and Tobago	Embassy		
Tunisia	Embassy		
Turkey	Embassy		
Ukraine	Embassy		
United Arab Emirates	Embassy		
United Kingdom	Embassy		
United States	Embassy		
Uruguay	Embassy		
Venezuela	Embassy		
Vietnam	Embassy		
Zambia	Embassy		
Zimbabwe	Embassy		

== Other mission in Brasília ==
Delegation	Mission type	Image	Website
European Union	Delegation		
Sahrawi Arab Democratic Republic	Mission		

== Consular missions ==
=== Bagé ===
Delegation	Mission type	Image	Website
Uruguay	Consulate		

=== Belém ===
Delegation	Mission type	Image	Website
Japan	Consulate		
Portugal	Consulate		
Suriname	Consulate-General		

=== Belo Horizonte ===
Delegation	Mission type	Image	Website
Argentina	Consulate-General		
Italy	Consulate-General		
Portugal	Consulate		
United Kingdom	Consulate		
United States	Embassy Branch Office		
Uruguay	Consulate		

=== Boa Vista ===
Delegation	Mission type	Image	Website
Guyana	Consulate		

=== Cáceres ===
Delegation	Mission type	Image	Website
Bolivia	Consulate		

=== Chuí ===
Delegation	Mission type	Image	Website
Uruguay	Consulate		

=== Corumbá ===
Delegation	Mission type	Image	Website
Bolivia	Consulate		

=== Curitiba ===
Delegation	Mission type	Image	Website
Argentina	Consulate		
Italy	Consulate-General		
Japan	Consulate-General		
Paraguay	Consulate-General		
Poland	Consulate-General		
Portugal	Consulate		

=== Epitaciolândia (Note: Formerly located in the twin city of Brasileia) ===
Delegation	Mission type	Image	Website
Bolivia	Consulate		

=== Florianópolis ===
Delegation	Mission type	Image	Website
Argentina	Consulate		
Haiti	Consulate-General		
Uruguay	Consulate-General		

=== Fortaleza ===
Delegation	Mission type	Image	Website
Portugal	Consulate		

=== Foz do Iguaçu ===
Delegation	Mission type	Image	Website
Argentina	Consulate		
Paraguay	Consulate-General		

=== Guaíra ===
Delegation	Mission type	Image	Website
Paraguay	Consulate		

=== Guajará-Mirim ===
Delegation	Mission type	Image	Website
Bolivia	Consulate		

=== Jaguarão ===
Delegation	Mission type	Image	Website
Uruguay	Consulate		

=== Manaus ===
Delegation	Mission type	Image	Website
Colombia	Consulate-General		
Japan	Consulate-General		
Peru	Consulate-General		

=== Ponta Porã ===
Delegation	Mission type	Image	Website
Paraguay	Consulate		

=== Porto Alegre ===
Delegation	Mission type	Image	Website
Argentina	Consulate-General		
Chile	Consulate-General		
Germany	Consulate-General		
Italy	Consulate-General		
Japan	Consular Office		
Portugal	Consulate		
Spain	Consulate-General		
United States	Consulate-General		
Uruguay	Consulate-General		

=== Porto Murtinho ===
Delegation	Mission type	Image	Website
Paraguay	Consulate		

=== Quaraí ===
Delegation	Mission type	Image	Website
Uruguay	Consulate		

=== Recife ===
Delegation	Mission type	Image	Website
Argentina	Consulate		
China	Consulate-General		
France	Consulate-General		
Germany	Consulate-General		
Italy	Consulate		
Japan	Consulate-General		
Portugal	Consulate-General		
United Kingdom	Consulate-General		
United States	Consulate-General		

=== Rio Branco ===
Delegation	Mission type	Image	Website
Peru	Consulate-General		

=== Rio de Janeiro ===
Delegation	Mission type	Image	Website
Angola	Consulate-General		
Argentina	Consulate-General		
Bolivia	Consulate-General		
Canada	Consulate-General		
Chile	Consulate-General		
China	Consulate-General		
Colombia	Consulate-General		
Dominican Republic	Consulate-General		
Egypt	Consulate-General		
France	Consulate-General		
Germany	Consulate-General		
Italy	Consulate-General		
Japan	Consulate-General		
Lebanon	Consulate-General		
Mexico	Consulate-General		
Netherlands	Consulate-General		
Norway	Consulate-General		
Panama	Consulate-General		
Paraguay	Consulate-General		
Peru	Consulate-General		
Portugal	Consulate-General		
Romania	Consulate-General		
Russia	Consulate-General		
Spain	Consulate-General		
Switzerland	Consulate-General		
United Kingdom	Consulate-General		
United States	Consulate-General		
Uruguay	Consulate-General		

=== Salvador da Bahia ===
Delegation	Mission type	Image	Website
Argentina	Consulate		
Haiti	Consulate-General		
Portugal	Consulate-General		
Spain	Consulate-General		

=== Santana do Livramento ===
Delegation	Mission type	Image	Website
Uruguay	Consulate		

=== Santos ===
Delegation	Mission type	Image	Website
Panama	Consulate-General		
Portugal	Consular Office		

=== São Paulo ===
Delegation	Mission type	Image	Website
Angola	Consulate-General		
Argentina	Consulate-General		
Australia	Consulate-General		
Austria	Consulate-General		
Belgium	Consulate-General		
Bolivia	Consulate-General		
Canada	Consulate-General		
Chile	Consulate-General		
China	Consulate-General		
Colombia	Consulate-General		
Cuba	Consulate-General		
Czech Republic	Consulate-General		
Denmark	Consulate-General		
Dominican Republic	Consulate-General		
Ecuador	Consulate-General		
Egypt	Commercial Office		
Finland	Consulate		
France	Consulate-General		
Germany	Consulate-General		
Greece	Consulate-General		
Haiti	Consulate-General		
Hungary	Consulate-General		
India	Consulate-General		
Ireland	Consulate-General		
Israel	Consulate-General		
Italy	Consulate-General		
Japan	Consulate-General		
Lebanon	Consulate-General		
Lithuania	Consulate-General		
Mexico	Consulate-General		
Netherlands	Consulate-General		
New Zealand	Consulate-General		
Paraguay	Consulate-General		
Peru	Consulate-General		
Portugal	Consulate-General		
Qatar	Consulate-General		
Republic of China (Taiwan)	Economic & Cultural Office		
Russia	Consulate-General		
South Africa	Consulate-General		
South Korea	Consulate-General		
Spain	Consulate-General		
Switzerland	Consulate-General		
Syria	Consulate-General		
Tunisia	Consular & Commercial Office		
Turkey	Consulate-General		
United Arab Emirates	Consulate-General		
United Kingdom	Consulate-General		
United States	Consulate-General		
Uruguay	Consulate-General		
Venezuela	Consulate		

=== Tabatinga ===
Delegation	Mission type	Image	Website
Colombia	Consulate		

=== Uruguaiana ===
Delegation	Mission type	Image	Website
Argentina	Consulate		

== Non-resident embassies accredited to Brazil ==
=== Resident in Havana, Cuba ===
- Djibouti
- Laos
- Mongolia
- Somalia
- Yemen

=== Resident in New York City, United Nations ===
- Bhutan
- Federated States of Micronesia
- Kiribati
- Marshall Islands
- Nauru
- Palau
- Papua New Guinea
- Samoa
- São Tomé and Príncipe
- Seychelles
- Solomon Islands
- Tonga
- Turkmenistan
- Tuvalu
- Vanuatu

=== Resident in Washington, D.C., United States of America ===
- Bosnia and Herzegovina
- Burundi
- Central African Republic
- Chad
- Eswatini
- Fiji
- Iceland
- Lesotho
- Liechtenstein
- Madagascar
- Mauritius
- Moldova
- Niger
- Sierra Leone
- Uganda
- Uzbekistan

=== Resident in other cities ===
- Antigua and Barbuda (St. John's)
- Brunei (Ottawa)
- Dominica (Roseau)
- Latvia (Lisbon)
- Montenegro (Buenos Aires)
- Saint Vincent and the Grenadines (Caracas)
- San Marino (Domagnano)

== Countries without an accredited non-resident mission to Brazil ==
- Afghanistan
- Andorra
- Bahamas
- Belize (Honorary Consulate in Fortaleza)
- Comoros
- Cook Islands
- Eritrea
- Gambia
- Grenada
- Jamaica
- Kyrgyzstan
- Liberia
- Maldives
- Monaco (Honorary Consulate in São Paulo)
- Nicaragua
- Niue
- Saint Kitts and Nevis
- Saint Lucia
- South Sudan
- Tajikistan

== Closed missions ==
Host city	Sending country	Mission	Year closed	Ref.
Brasília	Afghanistan	Embassy	2015	
Brasília	Burundi	Embassy (Note: Resident in Washington, D.C., United States of America)	2020	
Brasília	East Germany	Embassy (Note: East Germany embassy closed, due to the reunification of Germany.)	1990	
Brasília	Fiji	Embassy	2019	
Brasília	Jamaica	Embassy	2021	
Brasília	Mongolia	Embassy (Note: Resident in Havana, Cuba)	2017	
Brasília	Nicaragua	Embassy	2024	
Belém	Colombia	Consulate	1987	
Belém	Venezuela	Consulate	2020	
Boa Vista	Venezuela	Consulate	2020	
Campo Grande	Bolivia	Consulate	2012	
Campo Grande	Paraguay	Consulate-General	2024	
Cuiabá	Bolivia	Consulate	2012	
Curitiba	Ukraine	Consulate	2014	
Curitiba	Uruguay	Consulate-General	2021	
Florianópolis	Portugal	Consulate	2000	
Manaus	Cuba	Consulate-General	2022	
Manaus	Portugal	Consulate-General	2018	
Manaus	Venezuela	Consulate	2009	
Paranaguá	Paraguay	Consulate	2018	
Pelotas	Uruguay	Consulate-General	2021	
Porto Alegre	Mexico	Consulate-General	2009	
Porto Alegre	Paraguay	Consulate-General	2024	
Recife	Venezuela	Consulate	2020	
Rio de Janeiro	Austria	Consulate-General	2010	
Rio de Janeiro	Belgium	Consulate-General	2026	
Rio de Janeiro	Greece	Consulate-General	2005	
Rio de Janeiro	Guinea	Consulate		
Rio de Janeiro	Israel	Consulate-General	2002	
Rio de Janeiro	Poland	Consulate-General	2008	
Rio de Janeiro	Sweden	Consulate-General	1991	
Rio de Janeiro	Venezuela	Consulate	2020	
Salvador da Bahia	Uruguay	Consulate	2021	
Santos	Paraguay	Consulate		
São Paulo	Panama	Consulate-General	2018	
São Paulo	Poland	Consulate-General	2013	
São Paulo	Romania	Consulate		
São Paulo	Suriname	Consulate-General		
São Paulo	Sweden	Consulate-General	1983	
São Paulo	Ukraine	Consulate	2021	
Uruguaiana	Uruguay	Consulate	2002	

== Missions to be opened ==
Host city	Sending country	Mission	References
Brasília	Bosnia and Herzegovina	Embassy	
Brasília	Lithuania	Embassy	
Brasília	Uzbekistan	Embassy	
São Paulo	Bangladesh	Consulate-General	
São Paulo	Croatia	Consulate-General	
São Paulo	Luxembourg	Consulate-General	

== See also ==
- Foreign relations of Brazil
- List of diplomatic missions of Brazil
- Ministry of Foreign Affairs of Brazil
- Visa requirements for Brazilian citizens
