= Brazil–Taiwan relations =

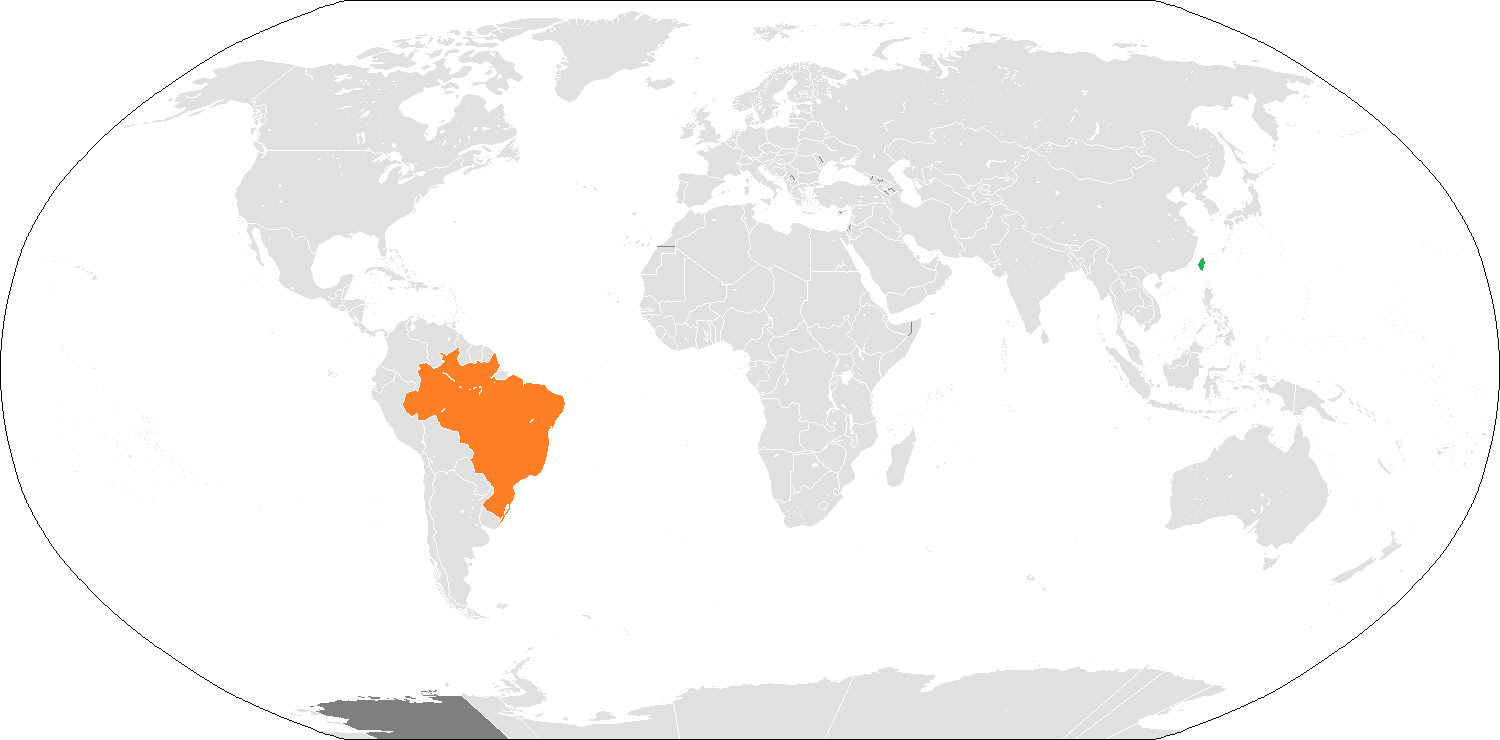
- Taiwan: Brazil

Diplomatic mission
- Taipei Economic and Cultural Office, Brasília: Commercial Office of Brazil, Taipei

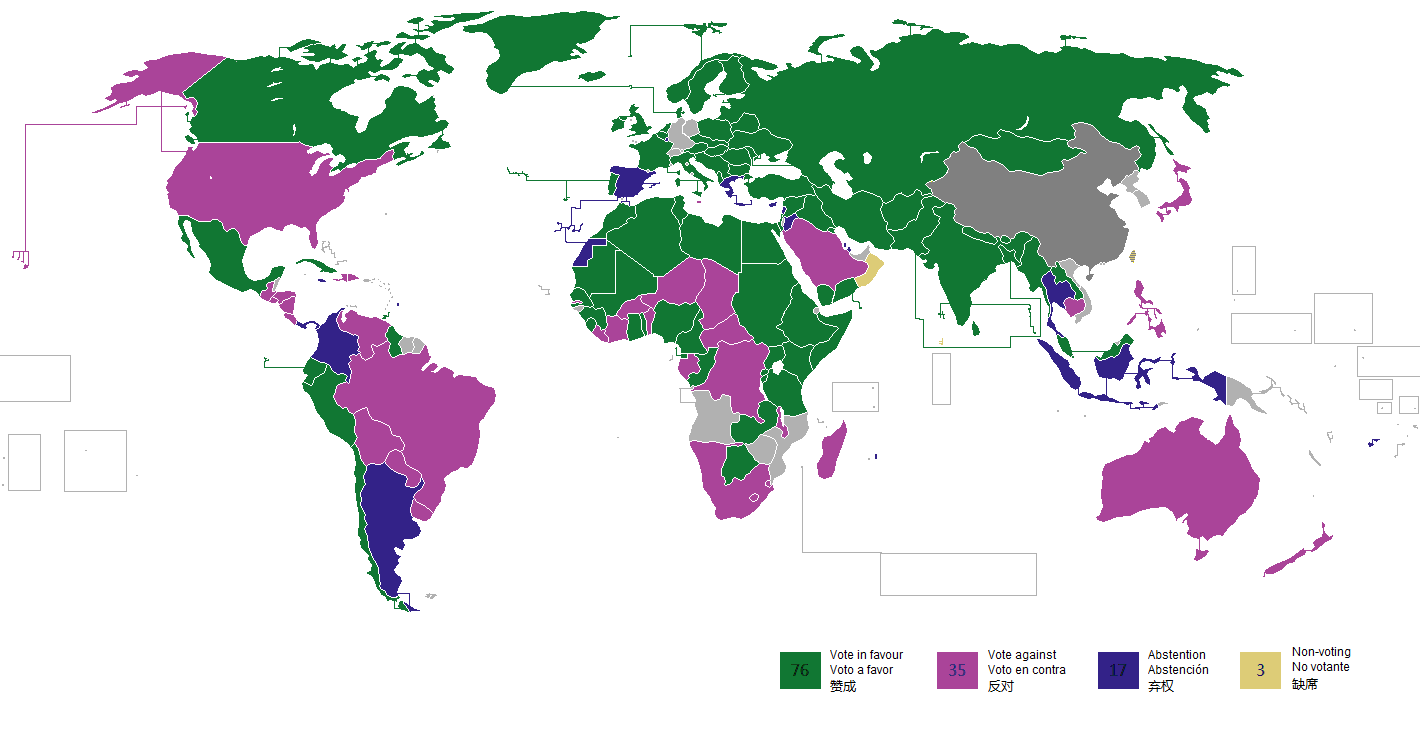
Brazil opposed the replacement in UN-2758

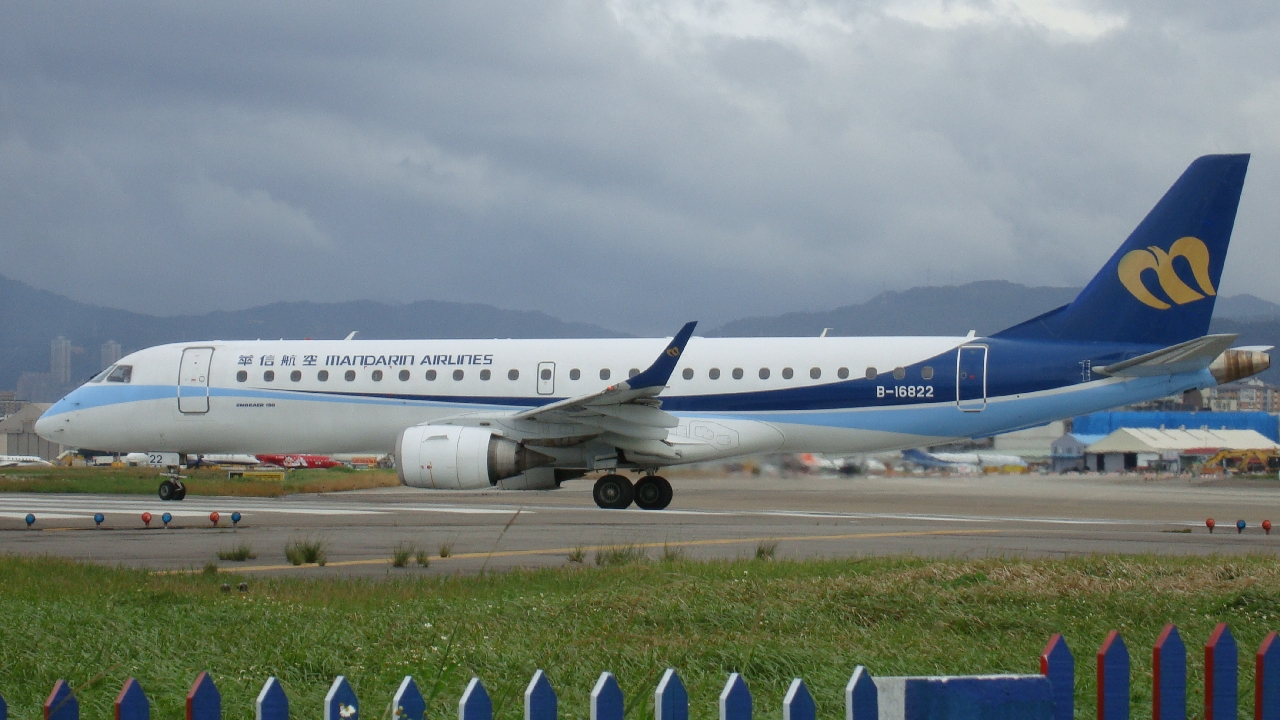
Mandarin Airlines Embraer-190 aircraft which was made in Brazil

The Republic of China (Taiwan) and the Federative Republic of Brazil do not have official diplomatic relations, as Brazil acknowledges the One-China policy. However, the two nations maintain unofficial diplomatic relations via economic and cultural offices.

== History ==
Formal relations between the Empire of Brazil and the Qing dynasty were established in September 1880 with the Treaty of Friendship, Commerce and Navigation. The Chinese refused, however, to permit Brazilians to hire Chinese as contract laborers, knowing that non-white laborers were treated "as machines or as cheap labour". The British were also opposed to the importation of Chinese labor to Brazil, believing it would inevitably result in de facto slavery. (Slavery in Brazil was only abolished in 1888.) Late in 1893, José de Costa Azevedo, Baron of Ladario, went to Beijing to negotiate a new treaty on immigration, but the Chinese were uninterested. Relations continued under the Republic of China (ROC) on its founding in 1912 which Brazil recognized and maintained even after the central government was moved to the former Japanese colony of Taiwan (1895–1945).

In 1971, Brazil voted against United Nations General Assembly Resolution 2758 which replaced the ROC with the PRC at the United Nations, but from August 15, 1974, Brazil recognized the People's Republic of China (PRC) and suspended diplomatic relations with Republic of China (Taiwan). After diplomatic relations between Taiwan and Brazil were suspended, both diplomatic missions were replaced by representative offices.

== Representation ==
The Taiwanese Government established the Taipei Economic and Cultural Office in Brazil (Chinese: 駐巴西臺北經濟文化代表處) at Brasília, and two other offices in São Paulo and Rio de Janeiro. The office in Rio de Janeiro was closed in 2002.

The Government of Brazil similarly established the Commercial Office of Brazil to Taipei (Portuguese: Escritório Comercial do Brasil em Taipé, Chinese: 巴西商務辦事處) in the capital of Taiwan.

== Taiwanese immigration to Brazil ==
Significant immigration of Taiwanese to Brazil started in the 1960s. Most Taiwanese Brazilians were farmers from Kaohsiung.

Many Taiwanese Brazilians now live in the states of São Paulo, Rio Grande do Sul, Paraná and Rio de Janeiro. The ninth-largest city in Brazil, Recife, is another important Taiwanese Brazilian settlement, most of whom are from Meinong, Kaohsiung. In the suburbs of São Paulo, over a hundred Taiwanese Brazilians have established mushroom farms that supply the whole of Brazil.

== Economic relations ==
Taiwan is one of Brazil's most important trade partners in Asia. The main export products from Brazil to Taiwan are ore, soybean, corn, woods, steel, cotton, leather and granite. Brazil is the eighteenth trade partner for Taiwan. The main products which Taiwan exports to Brazil are electrical equipment, record equipment, LCD, steel products and plastic products.

Many Taiwanese electronic companies have established factories in Brazil. AS Foxconn, Asus, MSI, Compal, Gigabyte, Acer, AOC, D-Link and so on.

== See also ==
- VivaTaiwan
