= Sergio Rodrigues (architect) =

Brazilian architect and designer

- Born: Sergio Roberto Santos Rodrigues; September 22, 1927; Rio de Janeiro, Brazil
- Died: September 1, 2014 (aged 86); Rio de Janeiro, Brazil
- Occupations: Architect, furniture designer
- Years active: 1952–2014

Sergio Roberto Santos Rodrigues (September 22, 1927 – September 1, 2014) was a Brazilian Carioca architect and furniture designer. Along with Joaquim Tenreiro and José Zanine Caldas, Rodrigues was a pioneer of Brazilian industrial design and played a key role in introducing it to international audiences. He studied at the Faculdade Nacional de Arquitetura da Universidade do Brasil in Rio de Janeiro, enrolling in 1947 and graduating in 1951.

== Early life and education ==
Rodrigues was born in Rio de Janeiro in 1927. He graduated from the Faculdade Nacional de Arquitetura in 1952. After graduating, he worked on the Curitiba Civic Center project—an important example of modern Brazilian architecture—alongside architects David Azambuja, Flávio Régis do Nascimento, and Olavo Redig de Campos.

== Career ==
=== Early Career ===
While still a student, Rodrigues worked as an assistant professor to architect David Xavier de Azambuja. In 1951, Azambuja invited him to participate in the design of the Civic Center of Curitiba alongside architects Olavo Redig de Campos and Flávio Régis do Nascimento, through whom he first met Lúcio Costa, a relationship that would prove formative in his career. After graduating, Rodrigues moved to Curitiba, where he co-founded Móveis Artesanal Paranaense with the Hauner brothers. In 1954, the Hauners brought him to São Paulo to lead the interior architecture and design division of their new company, Forma S.A. During this period he encountered the work of various European designers and met figures including Gregori Warchavchik and Lina Bo Bardi.

=== Influences ===
Rodrigues's early contact with Brazil's modern architects, including Lúcio Costa and Oscar Niemeyer, both of whom befriended Rodrigues, proved instrumental in shaping his design aesthetic. Costa, Niemeyer, and their contemporaries had developed a distinctive Modernist architectural language for Brazil, adapted to the country's climate and culture. Their buildings featured sweeping curves and organic forms—qualities Rodrigues began incorporating into furniture design after leaving architecture. He later recalled: "Furniture was lacking the national identity achieved in architecture."

=== Oca ===
In 1955, Rodrigues founded Oca, which became one of Brazil's preeminent furniture companies and served as a platform for his growing portfolio of chair designs. In 1956, he produced furniture designs dedicated to Costa and Niemeyer. Niemeyer would later commission Rodrigues to furnish many of his new buildings in Brasília.

Costa later recalled: "In that time, at the beginning of Brasília, we didn't have time to think about designing any furniture. We used furniture from the market, selecting as the Palace wanted. The main designer we selected was Sergio Rodrigues."

Niemeyer also noted the cultural moment Rodrigues inhabited: "In fact, in this moment he did coexist the Brazilian-Brazil with 'The Girl from Ipanema', sung later (1962) by Tom Jobim and Vinicius de Moraes."

In 1963, with the goal of making modern furniture available at affordable prices, Rodrigues founded Meia-Pataca, a company focused on mass-produced furniture, which operated until 1968.

Rodrigues disassociated himself from Oca in 1968 to establish his own studio devoted to furniture, architecture, and interior design.

== Notable works ==
=== Oscar armchair (1956) ===
The Oscar armchair (originally designated PL-7 Jockey) was designed in 1956 for the Rio de Janeiro Jockey Club, but the club's directors rejected it, reportedly considering the design too modern for the time. Rodrigues displayed the chairs in the window of his Oca store in Ipanema, where architect Oscar Niemeyer saw and admired them, becoming the first purchaser. Rodrigues subsequently renamed the chair in Niemeyer's honor. The chair features a turned solid wood frame with sculpted arms and a seat and backrest in woven cane, with options for leather upholstery. It remains in production today.

=== Mole chair (1957) ===
Rodrigues's most famous work is the "Mole" chair (1957)—also known as the Sheriff's chair—made in leather and wood with innovative upholstery techniques. The name mole means "soft" in Portuguese. In 1961, the chair was awarded first prize at the International Furniture Competition in Cantu, Italy, where it was praised for its quintessentially Brazilian approach to form and material. The Mole chair is part of the permanent collection of the Museum of Modern Art (MoMA) in New York. It is also part of the Metropolitan Museum of Art Met Collection.

=== Other notable designs ===
- "Lucio Costa" dining chair (1956)
- "Chifruda" chair (1962)
- "Cuiabá" chair (1985)
- "Katita" chair (1997)

== Design philosophy ==
Rodrigues worked with furniture design in the Modernist tradition, bringing Brazilian identity to his projects through both design and the use of traditional materials such as leather, native woods like jacaranda, and rattan. He said in a 2008 interview: "I would say that my search was for materials that characterize Brazilianness: noble woods, straw that comes from India and then passes through Europe. I think that leaves something very characteristic behind."

== Legacy ==
Over the course of his career, Rodrigues designed more than 1,200 pieces of furniture—a prolific output comparable to that of his Danish contemporary Hans Wegner. He is widely regarded as the father of modern Brazilian furniture and is credited with helping make his country's design sensibility internationally known.

Rodrigues died on September 1, 2014, in Rio de Janeiro, of liver failure, at the age of 86.
