= Alexandre de Gusmão =

Portuguese diplomat from Colonial Brazil

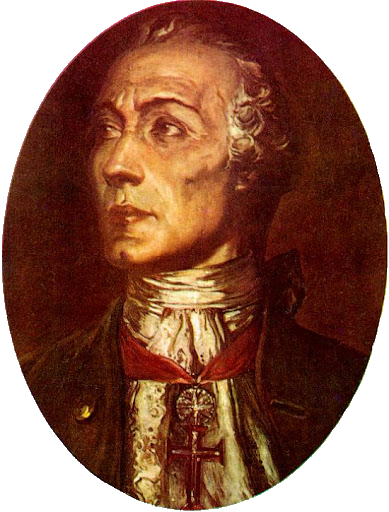
- Non contemporary portrait by Oswaldo Teixeira

Personal details
- Born: 17 July 1695 Santos, São Paulo, State of Brazil, Portuguese Empire
- Died: 9 May 1753 (aged 57) Lisbon, Kingdom of Portugal
- Education: University of Coimbra
- Profession: Statesman; diplomat

Alexandre de Gusmão (17 July 1695 in Santos – 9 May 1753 in Lisbon) was a Portuguese diplomat from Colonial Brazil. He is regarded as one of the best diplomats of his time, chiefly for his role in negotiating the Treaty of Madrid in 1750 (revoked in 1761), when Portugal and Spain were attempting to delimit their territorial possessions in South America and Asia.

Born in the city of Santos, he may be considered one of the precursors of the application of Enlightenment principles to international relations, adopting the principle of uti possidetis, according to which each state has the right to the land that it actually occupies, as well as the idea of "natural boundaries", which suggests the use of prominent geographical accidents – such as rivers and mountain ranges – to set the limits between states.

He graduated in Law and was the representative of Portugal to various states, among which Rome, where he came to be invited to join Pope Innocent XIII's court. He was also a brother of Bartolomeu de Gusmão, a priest and naturalist recalled for his early work on lighter-than-air airship design (balloons).

== Treaty of Madrid negotiations ==
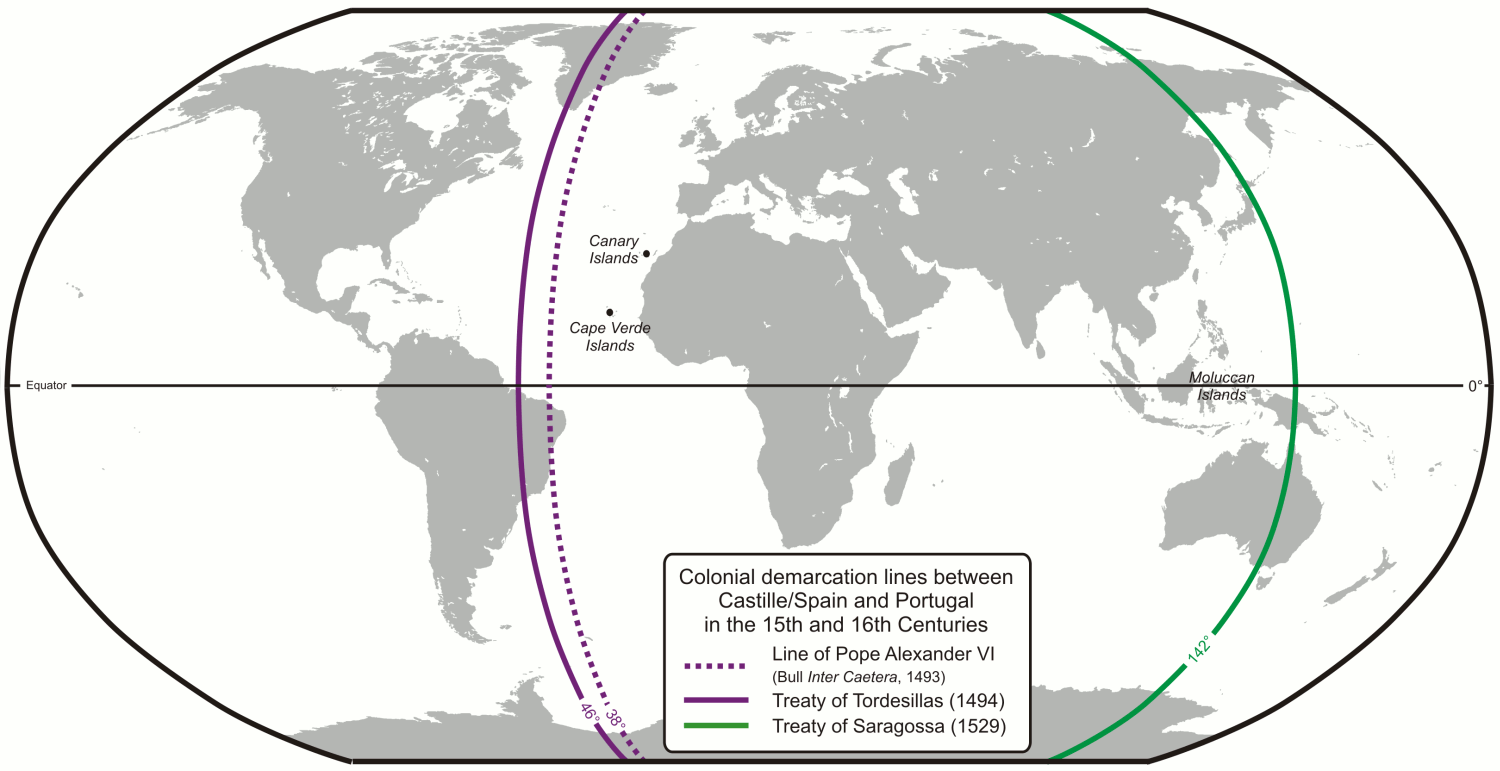
Earth showing Tordesillas Line in purple and Saragossa line in green. Portugal was to develop its Empire in the centre of the map and Spain on the two sides

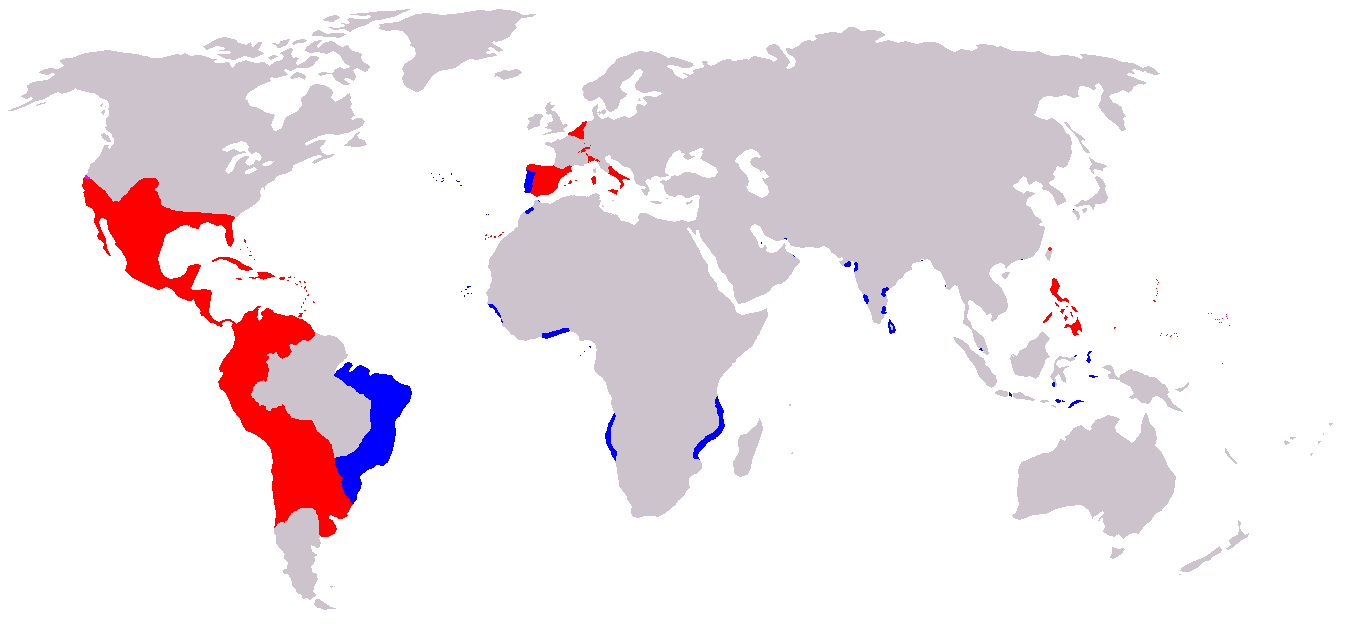
Spanish and Portuguese Empires during their personal union (1581-1640) Red/Pink - Spanish Empire Blue/Light Blue - Portuguese Empire

During the period of the Iberian Union (1580–1640), due to the Portuguese dynastic succession crisis, Portugal and all its territorial possessions in Africa, Asia and the Americas came under the control of the Philippine Dynasty, of Spain. Because both countries had come under the same rule, there ceased to be boundaries between their territories in their colonies, which had been established by the Treaty of Tordesillas (1494) in America and the Treaty of Zaragoza (1529) in Asia. Hence, the colonial explorers (bandeirantes) from the Portuguese colony of Brazil expanded westwards into the centre of the continent, occupying what was once Spanish and Amerindian territory. In Asia, on the other hand, Spanish explorers expanded to occupy territory which had been attributed to Portugal under the Treaty of Zaragoza.

When the union of the two crowns ended, in 1640, there was the need to renegotiate the boundaries of both territories, and Portugal's interest was to preserve its new possessions in America, while Spain wished to return to the limits defined by the Treaty of Tordesillas and the Treaty of Zaragoza, which had never been officially revoked.

By means of studies submitted to the Spanish Court, Gusmão proved that while Portugal had breached the Tordesillas Line, with the Portuguese occupying part of the Amazon basin and the Center-West of South America, Spain had breached the Zaragoza Line by expanding its possessions in Asia, taking the Philippines, the Marianas and the Moluccas, which were once Portuguese. Alexandre de Gusmão successfully argued that the losses of one kingdom in one region had been compensated by its gains in another, and that the principle for territorial division should be the effective occupation of the land (uti possidetis). Through ample documentation and efficient negotiation, he thus managed to secure for Portugal (and, after independence, for Brazil) most of the current Brazilian territory.

== Places where he lived ==
- 1695–1708: Santos, Brazil
- 1708: Bahia, Brazil
- 1709–1714: Coimbra, Portugal
- 1714–1719: Paris, France
- 1719–1723: Lisbon, Portugal
- 1723–1730: Rome, Italy
- 1730–1753: Lisbon, Portugal

== Education ==
- 1708: Santos and Bahia — Preparatory studies
- 1715–1719: Paris — Studies of Civil Law, Roman Law and Ecclesiastic Law at the Sorbonne
- 1719: Coimbra — Bachelor's degree at the School of Law

== Bachelor's degree in law ==
In 1710, Alexandre de Gusmão moved to Lisbon to live with his brother Bartolomeu de Gusmão. Through contacts in the Portuguese Court, he was appointed secretary to the Portuguese Embassy in Paris, in 1715, where he studied law at the Sorbonne.

== Diplomatic posts ==
- 1714–1730: Paris and Rome — Agent of the House of Portugal.
- 1715: Paris — Takes part in the negotiations of the peace Treaty of Utrecht, between Portugal and Spain.
- 1730–1750: Lisbon — Counsellor and personal secretary of king Dom João V.
- 1743–1753: Lisbon — Member of the Ultramarine Council.
- 1750: Lisbon — Formulator of the Portuguese position and negotiator of the Treaty of Madrid.

== External links (in Portuguese) ==
- Fundação Alexandre de Gusmão
- Personalidades e Diplomatas Históricos
- Resumo da biografia de Alexandre de Gusmão
- Almanaque Folha - História de SP
