= Angola–Brazil relations =

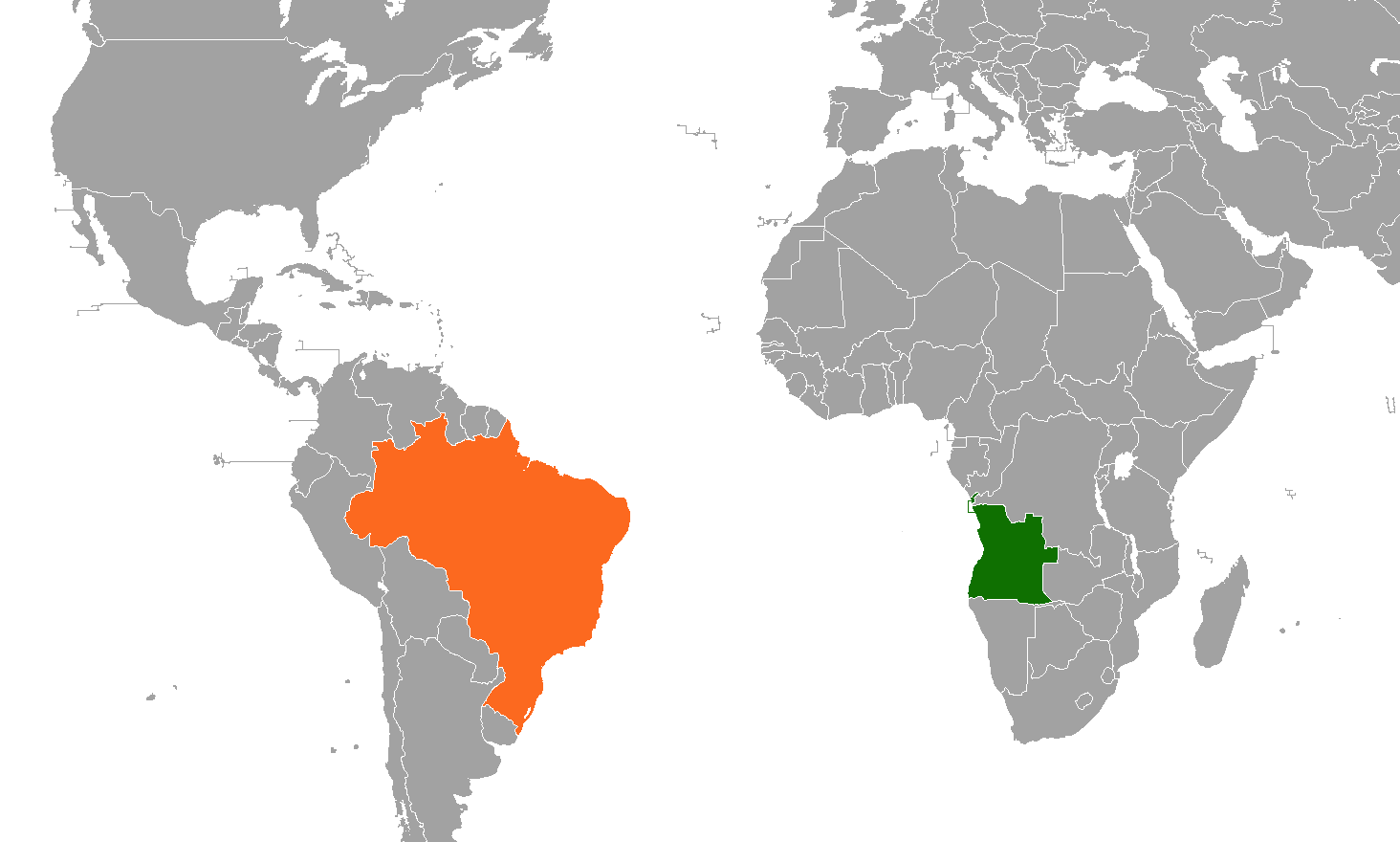
- Angola: Brazil

Angola–Brazil relations (Portuguese: Relações Angola-Brasil) are the bilateral relations between Angola and Brazil. As former Portuguese colonies, Angola and Brazil share many cultural ties, including language (Portuguese is the official language of both countries) and religion (a majority of both countries are Roman Catholics). Both nations are members of the Community of Portuguese Language Countries, Group of 77 and the United Nations.

== History ==
=== Period of the transatlantic slave trade ===
Both Angola and Brazil were once united for three hundred years as part of the Portuguese Empire. In 1646, Jesuit priest Gonçalo João succinctly stated the importance of the economic relationship between Brazil and Angola as "Without Angola, there is no Brazil". Angola was a major source of slaves to Brazil, which was, out of the several European colonies in the Americas, the largest single importer of slaves during the Transatlantic Slave Trade. Two-thirds of those slaves in Brazil originated from the Angola-Congo region. Rio de Janeiro depended on the consistent influx of slaves from Angola to work on sugar cane plantations and for re-exportation to Buenos Aires in exchange for silver.

During Dutch occupation of Angola in early 17th century, Brazil and Portugal acted as "co-colonizers" together in their efforts to reclaim the territory. Brazilian historian Luiz Felipe de Alencastro suggests that this critical historical period cemented Brazil's connection to Angola for the duration of the slave trade, and that the construction of Brazil occurred vis-à-vis the destruction of Angola's indigenous kingdoms.

After the fleet of Salvador de Sá successfully expelled the Dutch from Angola in 1648, Angola was essentially under Brazilian rule, thereby "ensuring the continuity of slavery in Brazil for more than two centuries". Salvador de Sá similarly understood Brazil's economic dependence on Angola and its consequential importance to Portugal, and is quoted as saying that "without that stronghold[i.e., Angola] Brazil cannot survive, nor can Portugal survive without Brazil".

From 1815 to 1822, Angola was administered by Brazil during the Transfer of the Portuguese Court to Brazil. Economic relations between Angola and Portugal had never been as strong as that of Brazil and Angola, and Portuguese influence was minimal in the early 19th century, having been usurped by Brazilian control of the slave trade. The children of Angolan elite were often sent to be educated in Rio de Janeiro as opposed to Lisbon. After Brazilian independence in 1822, there was a desire among some communities in Luanda and Benguela to also declare independence from Portugal and form a confederacy with Brazil. These plans ultimately failed due to diplomatic pressure from Great Britain who did not want to see the creation of a new south Atlantic empire, and stronger political lobbying on part of Angolans who were aligned with Lisbon. In addition, one of the stipulations of Brazil's independence from Portugal was a clause that Brazil would promise not to accept direct control over any Luso-African territories.

=== Angolan Independence and Post-Independence relations ===
In November 1975, Brazil became the first country to recognize and establish diplomatic relations with the newly independent Angola. Soon afterwards, Angola descended into a civil war which lasted until 2002. In July 2002, Angolan President José Eduardo dos Santos paid a visit to Brazil to attend the 4th CPLP Summit in Brasília. In 2003, Brazilian President, Luiz Inácio Lula da Silva, paid an official visit to Angola. There would be several high-level visits between leaders of both nations.

The Angola–Brazil relationship benefits from the presence of a significant number of Brazilian workers, self-employed professionals and entrepreneurs, who work, live and contribute to Angola's economy. In the defense area, Brazil participates in military exercises alongside Angola, either within the scope of the CPLP, or in the context of the “Obangame Express” operation on simulations to combat illicit activities in the Gulf of Guinea. In addition, each year the Brazilian Army has deployed officers to collaborate in matters of instruction with their Angolan counterparts, including in a project to create a training center for peace operations, along the lines of an existing counterpart in Brazil.

In November 2015 both nations celebrated 40 years of diplomatic relations. In January 2019, Angolan Foreign Minister, Manuel Domingos Augusto, paid a visit to Brazil to attend the inauguration of President Jair Bolsonaro. In December 2019, Brazilian Foreign Minister, Ernesto Araújo, paid an official visit to Angola and met with President João Lourenço.

== High-level visits ==
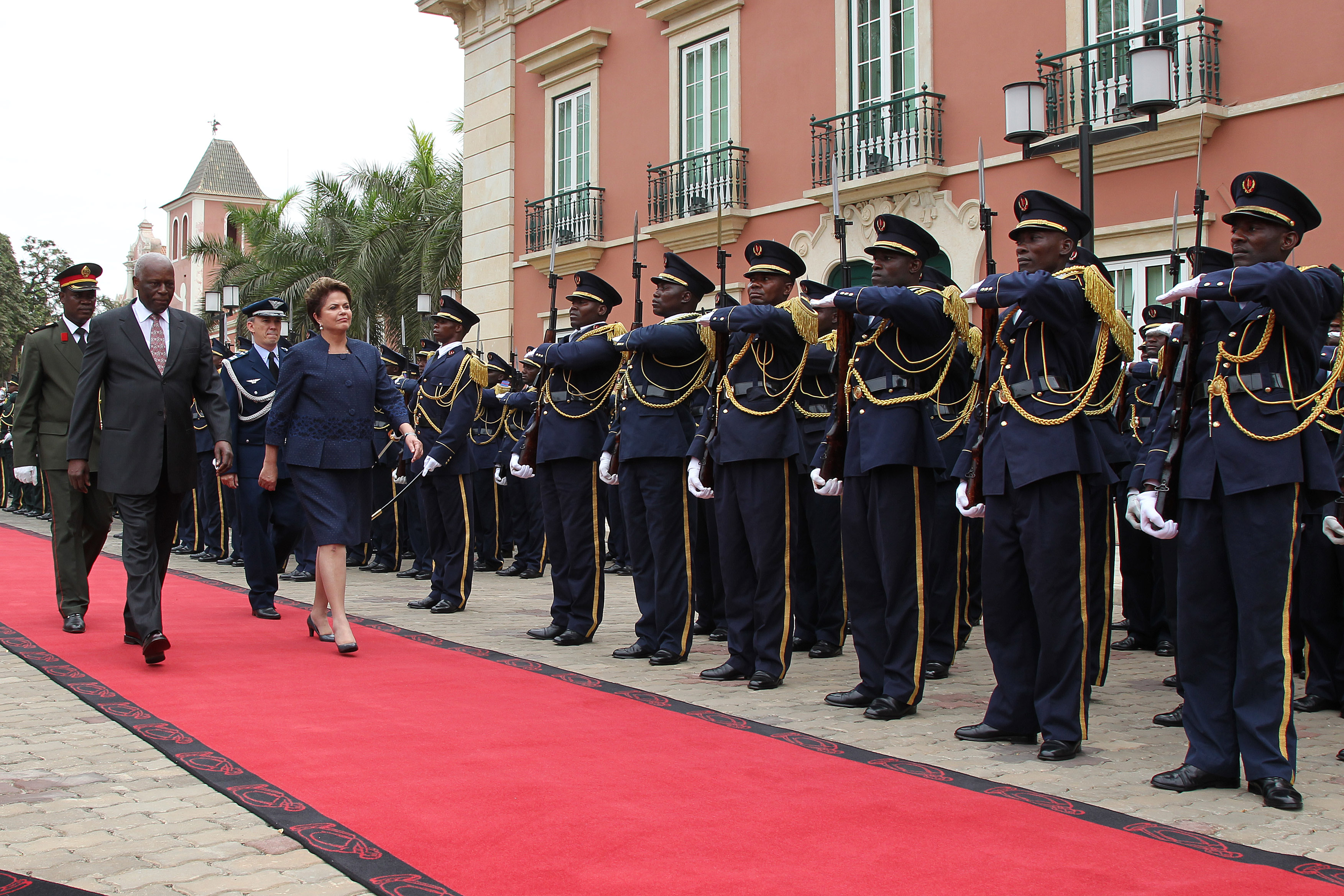
Angolan President José Eduardo dos Santos along with Brazilian President Dilma Rousseff during her official visit to Luanda, Angola; October 2011.

High-level visits from Angola to Brazil

- President José Eduardo dos Santos (2002, 2010, 2014)
- Foreign Minister Georges Rebelo Chikoti (2011, 2012, 2015)
- Vice President Manuel Vicente (2016)
- Foreign Minister Manuel Domingos Augusto (2019)

High-level visits from Brazil to Angola

- President Luiz Inácio Lula da Silva (2003, 2007, 2010, 2023)
- Foreign Minister Antonio Patriota (2011)
- President Dilma Rousseff (2011)
- Foreign Minister Mauro Vieira (2015, 2016)
- Vice President Michel Temer (2015)
- Foreign Minister Aloysio Nunes (2018)
- Foreign Minister Ernesto Araújo (2019)
- Vice President Hamilton Mourão (2021)
- Foreign Minister Carlos Alberto França (2021)

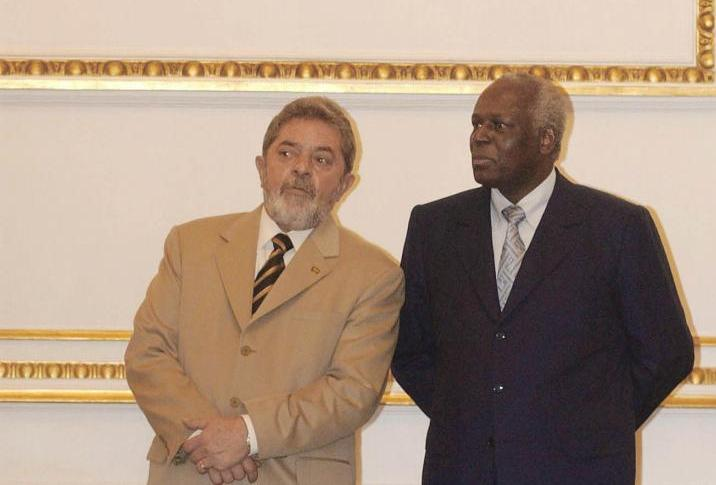
President Lula da Silva and President José Eduardo dos Santos in Luanda; 2003.

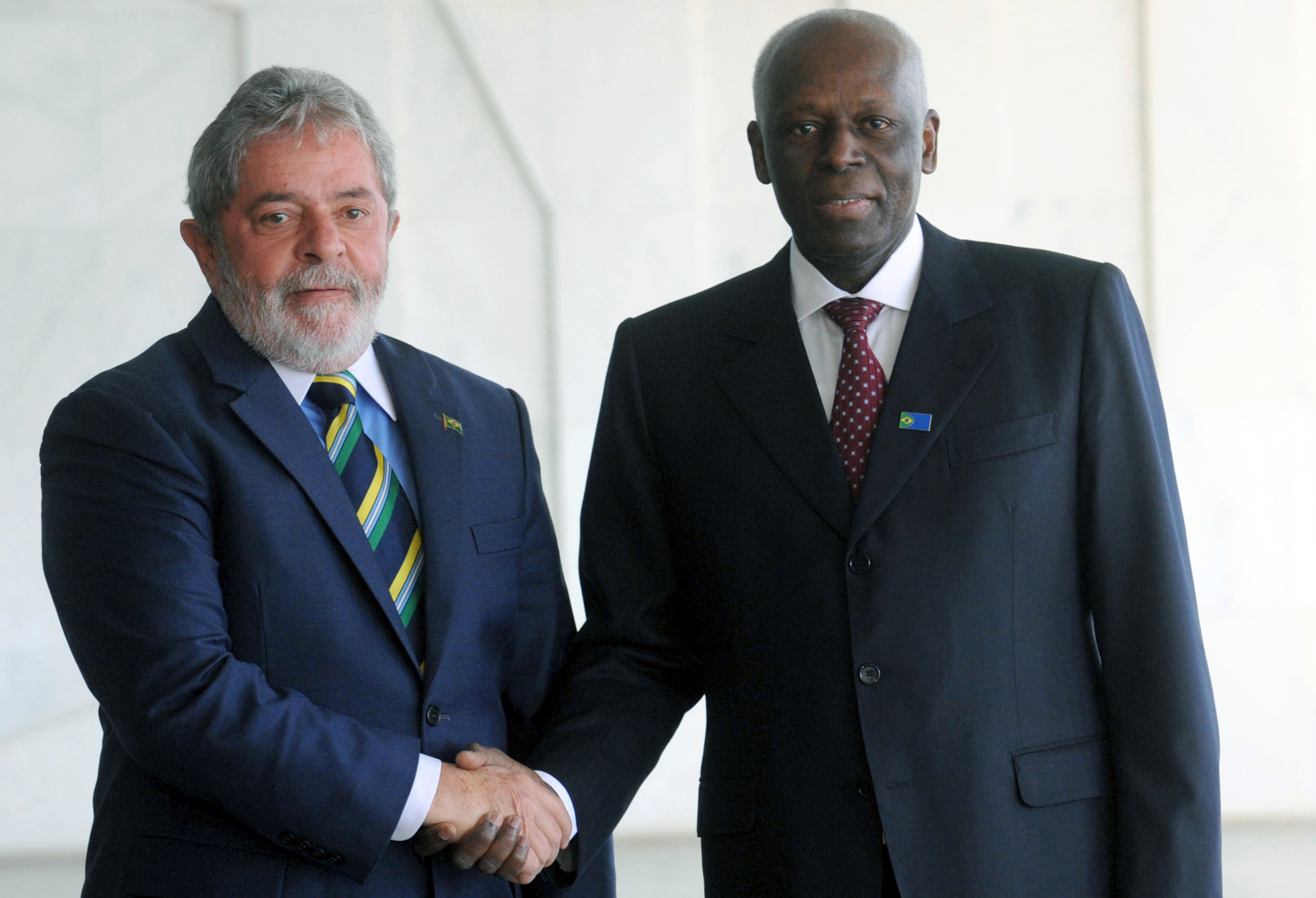
President Lula da Silva and President José Eduardo dos Santos in Brasília; 2010.

== Bilateral agreements ==
Both nations have signed a few agreements such as an Agreement on Economic, Scientific and Technical Cooperation (1980); Agreement on Strategic Partnership (2010); Agreement of Cooperation in Investment Facilitation (2015); and an Agreement on Security and Internal Order (2019).

== Cultural ties ==
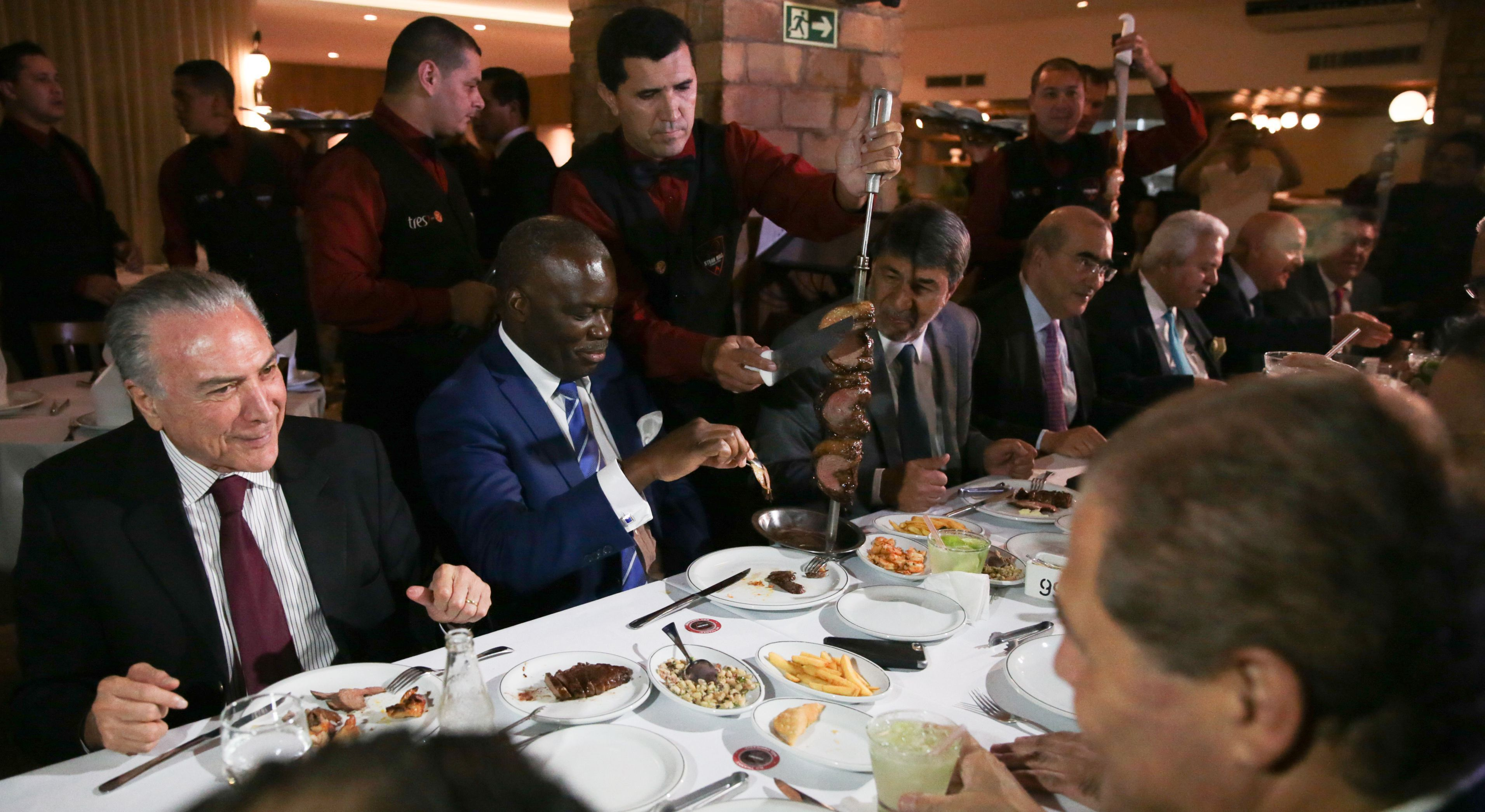
Brazilian president Michel Temer hosting the Angolan ambassador to Brazil and other potentates in a churrascaria

The Angolan government had also initiated the Kalunga Project to reconnect with the African diaspora in Brazil through art and music.

Literature Pepetela's A gloriosa família (The glorious family, 1996) takes place during the Dutch-Iberian conflict over the Brazil-Angolan slave trade in the 1600s. It illustrates the geopolitical conflicts of the time through the story of the Van Dunem family, made up of a Flemish patriarch, his African wife, and their mulatto children. The novel offers a critique of the oppression of the patriarchal slave-holding system that formed the foundation for the Angolan nation state.

José Eduardo Agualusa's Nação crioula (1997) takes place during the latter half of the 19th century when the abolitionist debate was taking place across the Atlantic. The novel focuses on the role of Luanda's Creole elites and Portuguese, and Brazilian merchants in the then-illegal transatlantic slave trade.

Music and dance A "cross-fertilization" of musical cultures and dances occurred in the Atlantic triangle beginning in the 17th and 18th centuries via cultural exchange. As a result of this exchange, both countries share a rich history of mixed Afro-Iberian musical traditions, such as the prevalence of the guitar, or viola. An example of early dance exchange is the umbigada, or belly blow, a "basic feature of many dances imported to Brazil and Portugal from the Congo-Angola region".

== Transportation ==
There are direct flights between Luanda and São Paulo with TAAG Angola Airlines.

== Resident diplomatic missions ==
of Angola in Brazil

- Brasília (Embassy)
- Rio de Janeiro (Consulate-General)
- São Paulo (Consulate-General)

of Brazil in Angola

- Luanda (Embassy)
- Luanda (Consulate-General)

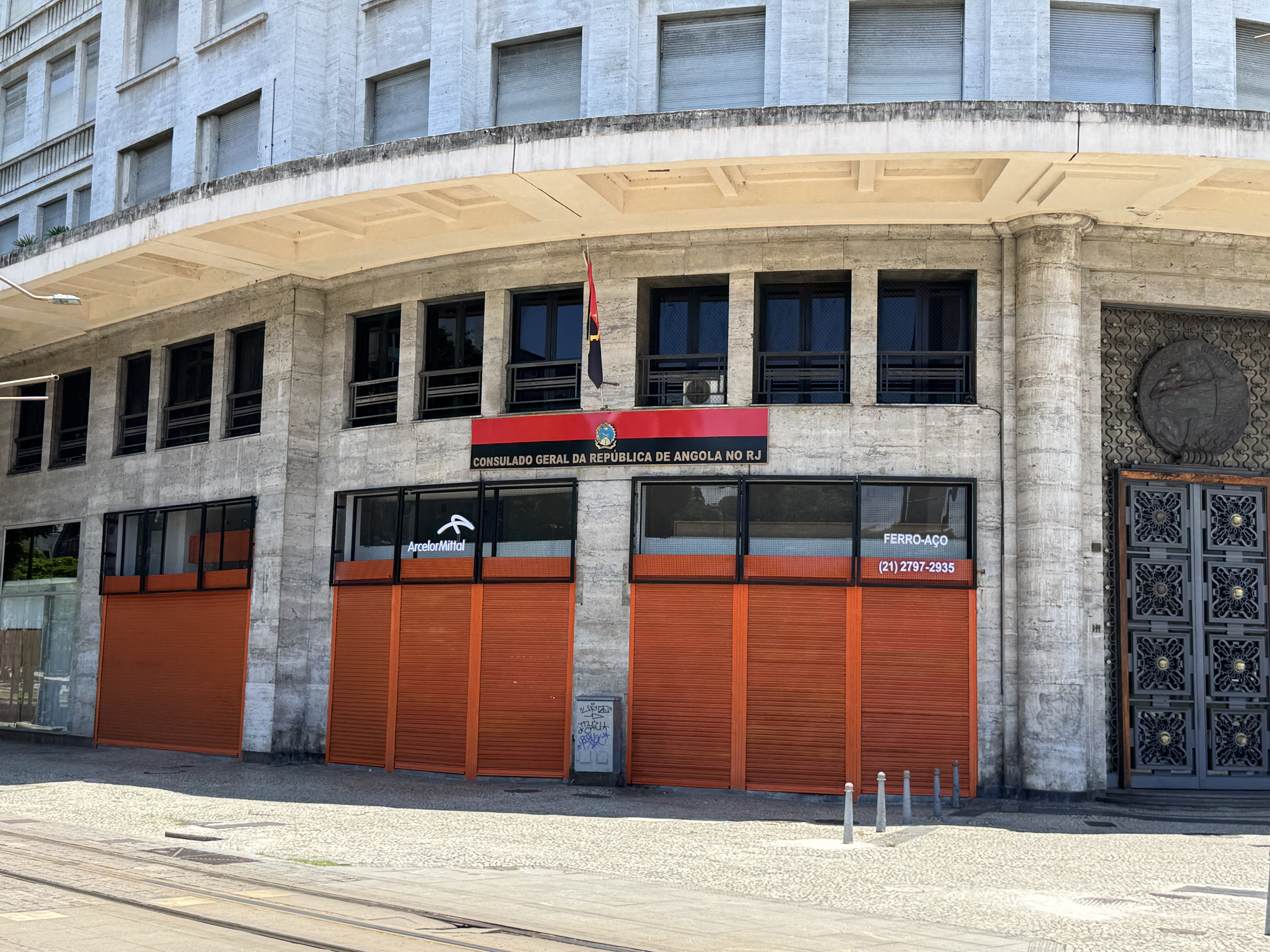
Consulate-General of Angola in Rio de Janeiro

== See also ==
- Angolans in Brazil
- Brazilians in Angola
- Kalunga Project
