= Ambassadors of Brazil =

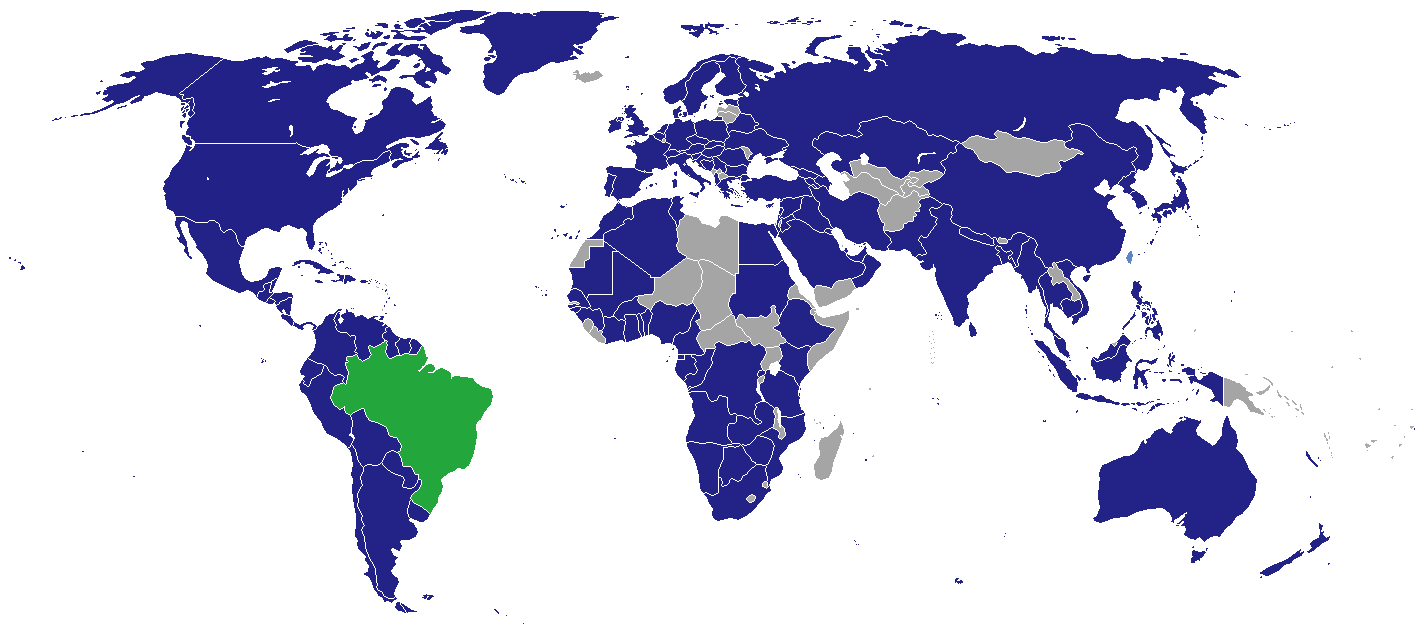
Map of the countries with Brazilian embassies.

Brazil has diplomatic representation with almost all other recognized states, with the exception of 56 of the 194 countries, being some of them Afghanistan, Bhutan, Cambodia, Fiji, Kiribati, Iceland, Marshall Islands, Micronesia, Monaco, Nauru, Palau, Samoa, San Marino, Solomon Islands, South Sudan, Taiwan, Tuvalu and Yemen, totalizing a relation with 138 countries in all of the continents and with the Palestinian National Authority. Currently, Brazil has strength its relations with the BRICS (Russia, India, China and South Africa) and the next eleven countries under development.

== Current Brazilian Ambassadors ==
| Host country | Ambassador | Website | Confirmed |
|---|---|---|---|
| Afghanistan | Brazil has a joint representation for Afghanistan in Islamabad. | | |
| Albania | João Tabajara de Oliveira Júnior | Tirana | 11 May 2022 |
| Algeria | Marcos Vinicius Pinta Gama | Algiers | 14 August 2024 |
| Andorra | Brazil has a joint representation for Andorra in Madrid. | | |
| Angola | Eugênia Barthelmess | Luanda | 10 July 2024 |
| Antigua and Barbuda | Brazil has closed this embassy in 2019. | | |
| Argentina | Julio Glinternick Bitelli | Buenos Aires | 17 May 2023 |
| Armenia | Fábio Vaz Pitaluga | Yerevan | 10 May 2022 |
| Australia | Claudio Frederico de Matos Arruda | Canberra | 21 June 2023 |
| Austria | Eduardo Paes Saboia | Vienna | 21 May 2025 |
| Azerbaijan | Bernard Jörg Leopold de Garcia Klingl | Baku | 17 July 2026 |
| Bahamas | Claudio Raja Gabaglia Lins | Nassau | 6 November 2019 |
| Bahrain | Adriano Silva Pucci | Manama | 4 July 2023 |
| Bangladesh | Paulo Fernando Dias Feres | Dhaka | 11 May 2022 |
| Barbados | Vera Lucia dos Santos Caminha Campetti | Bridgetown | 5 July 2021 |
| Belarus | Júlio Cesar Fontes Laranjeira | Minsk | 17 June 2026 |
| Belgium | Silvio José Albuquerque e Silva | Brussels | 28 May 2025 |
| Belize | Agemar de Mendonça Sanctos | Belmopan | 15 December 2021 |
| Benin | Regina Célia de Oliveira Bittencourt | Cotonou | 28 October 2015 |
| Bhutan | Brazil has a joint representation for Bhutan in New Delhi. | | |
| Bolivia | Luís Henrique Sobreira Lopes | La Paz | 10 May 2022 |
| Bosnia and Herzegovina | Maria Clara Duclos Carisio | Sarajevo | 13 September 2023 |
| Botswana | João Genésio de Almeida Filho | Gaborone | 4 July 2023 |
| Brunei | Brazil has a joint representation for Brunei in Kuala Lumpur. | | |
| Bulgaria | Paulo Roberto Campos Tarresse da Fontoura | Sofia | 2 August 2023 |
| Burkina Faso | Ellen Osthoff Ferreira de Barros | Ouagadougou | 23 September 2020 |
| Burundi | Brazil has a joint representation for Burundi in Nairobi. | | |
| Cabo Verde | Alexandre Henrique Scultori de Azevedo Silva | Praia | 10 July 2024 |
| Cambodia | Brazil has a joint representation for Cambodia in Bangkok. | | |
| Cameroon | Patrícia Maria Oliveira Lima | Yaoundé | 11 May 2022 |
| Canada | Carlos Alberto Franco França | Ottawa | 2 August 2023 |
| Central African Republic | Brazil has a joint representation for Central African Republic in Brazzaville. | | |
| Chad | Brazil has a joint representation for Chad in Yaoundé. | | |
| Chile | Paulo Roberto Soares Pacheco | Santiago | 23 September 2020 |
| China | Marcos Bezerra Abbott Galvão | Beijing | 15 December 2021 |
| Colombia | Paulo Estivallet de Mesquita | Bogotá | 15 December 2021 |
| Comoros | Brazil has a joint representation for Comoros in Dodoma. | | |
| (Republic of the Congo) Congo-Brazzaville | Renato Soares Menezes | Brazzaville | 23 September 2020 |
| (Democratic Republic of the Congo) Congo-Kinshasa (DRC) | Roberto Parente | Kinshasa | 15 December 2021 |
| Costa Rica | Antonio Alves Júnior | San José | 23 November 2022 |
| Croatia | Silvana Polich | Zagreb | 4 July 2023 |
| Cuba | Christian Vargas | Havana | 23 May 2023 |
| Cyprus | Ana Maria de Souza Bierrenbach | Nicosia | 10 December 2024 |
| Czech Republic | Orlando Leite Ribeiro | Prague | 8 July 2025 |
| Denmark | Leonardo Luís Gorgulho Nogueira Fernandes | Copenhagen | 19 June 2024 |
| Djibouti | Brazil has a joint representation for Djibouti in Addis Ababa. | | |
| Dominica | Brazil has closed this embassy in 2019. | | |
| Dominican Republic | Carlos Luís Dantas Coutinho Perez | Santo Domingo | 25 October 2023 |
| East Timor | Ricardo José Lustosa Leal | Dili | 28 May 2025 |
| Ecuador | Flávio Soares Damico | Quito | 14 August 2024 |
| Egypt | Paulino Franco Franco de Carvalho Neto | Cairo | 17 May 2023 |
| El Salvador | Luiz Eduardo de Auigar Villarinho Pedroso | San Salvador | 1 June 2022 |
| Equatorial Guinea | Leonardo Carvalho Monteiro | Malabo | 22 November 2022 |
| Eritrea | Brazil has a joint representation for Eritrea in Cairo. | | |
| Estonia | Rosimar da Silva Suzano | Tallinn | 10 July 2024 |
| Eswatini | Brazil has a joint representation for Eswatini in Maputo. | | |
| Ethiopia | Jandyr Ferreira dos Santos | Addis Ababa | 31 May 2022 |
| Fiji | Brazil has a joint representation for Fiji in Canberra. | | |
| Finland | Luís Antonio Balduino Carneiro | Helsinki | 2 December 2021 |
| France | Ricardo Neiva Tavares | Paris | 17 May 2023 |
| Gabon | Miguel Griesbach de Pereira Franco | Libreville | 10 December 2024 |
| Gambia | Brazil has a joint representation for Gambia in Dakar. | | |
| Georgia | Carlos Ricardo Martins Ceglia | Tbilisi | 10 December 2024 |
| Germany | Rodrigo de Lima Baena Soares | Berlin | 21 May 2025 |
| Ghana | Mariana Gonçalves Madeira | Accra | 19 June 2024 |
| Greece | Paulo Roberto Caminha de Castilhos França | Athens | 24 May 2023 |
| Grenada | Brazil has closed this embassy in 2019. | | |
| Guatemala | Henrique da Silveira Sardinha Pinto | Guatemala | 23 November 2022 |
| Guinea-Bissau | Pablo Duarte Cardoso | Bissau VPP | 10 June 2025 |
| Guinea-Conakry | Antônio Carlos de Salles Menezes | Conakry | 23 September 2020 |
| Guyana | Maria Cristina de Castro Martins | Georgetown | 12 December 2023 |
| Haiti | Luís Guilherme Nascentes da Silva | Port-au-Prince | 8 July 2025 |
| Holy See (Vatican City) | Everton Vieira Vargas | Vatican | 17 May 2023 |
| Honduras | Andréa Saldanha da Gama Watson | Tegucigalpa | 1 December 2021 |
| Hungary | Cláudia Fonseca Buzzi | Budapest | 8 July 2025 |
| Iceland | Brazil has a joint representation for Iceland in Oslo. | | |
| India | Kenneth Haczynski da Nóbrega | New Delhi | 17 May 2023 |
| Indonesia | George Monteiro Prata | Jakarta | 31 May 2023 |
| Iran | André Veras Guimarães | Tehran | 21 May 2025 |
| Iraq | Luís Ivaldo Villafañe Gomes Santos | Bhagdad | 23 September 2020 |
| Ireland | Flávio Helmold Macieira | Dublin | 10 July 2024 |
| Israel | Vacant since 29 May 2024. Fábio Moreira Farias, Chargé d'Affaires a.i. | Tel Aviv | |
| Italy | Renato Mosca de Souza | Rome | 21 June 2023 |
| Ivory Coast | José Carlos de Araújo Leitão | Abidjan | 23 September 2020 |
| Jamaica | Antonio Otávio Sá Ricarte, Chargé d'Affaires a.i. | Kingston | 10 March 2015 |
| Japan | Octávio Henrique Dias Garcia Côrtes | Tokyo | 10 May 2022 |
| Jordan | Márcio Fagundes do Nascimento | Amman | 22 November 2022 |
| Kazakhstan | Marcel Fortuna Biato | Astana | 10 July 2024 |
| Kenya | Daniella Conceição Mattos de Araujo | Nairobi | |
| Kiribati | Brazil has a joint representation for Kiribati in Wellington. | | |
| Kuwait | Rodrigo D'Araujo Gabsch | Kuwait City | 25 October 2023 |
| Kyrgyzstan | Brazil has a joint representation for Kyrgyzstan in Astana. | | |
| Laos | Brazil has a joint representation for Laos in Bangkok. | | |
| Latvia | Brazil has a joint representation for Latvia in Stockholm. | | |
| Lebanon | Tarcisio de Lima Ferreira Fernandes Costa | Beirut | 23 November 2022 |
| Lesotho | Brazil has a joint representation for Lesotho in Pretoria. | | |
| Liberia | Brazil has a joint representation for Liberia in Accra. | | |
| Libya | Brazil has a joint representation for Libya in Tunis. | | |
| Liechtenstein | Brazil has a joint representation for Liechtenstein in Bern. | | |
| Madagascar | Brazil has a joint representation for Madagascar in Maputo. | | |
| Malawi | Brazil has closed this embassy in 2022. | | |
| Malaysia | Daniella Ortega de Paiva Menezes | Kuala Lumpur | 11 June 2025 |
| Maldives | Brazil has a joint representation for Maldives in Colombo. | | |
| Mali | Isabel Cristina de Azevedo Heyvaert | Bamako | |
| Malta | Brazil has a joint representation for Malta in Vatican City. | | |
| Marshall Islands | Brazil has a joint representation for Marshall Islands in Manila. | | |
| Mauritania | Evaldo Freire | Nouakchott | 22 November 2022 |
| Mauritius | Brazil has a joint representation for Mauritius in Pretoria. | | |
| Mexico | Nedilson Ricardo Jorge | Mexico City | 10 July 2024 |
| Micronesia | Brazil has a joint representation for Micronesia in Manila. | | |
| Moldova | Brazil has a joint representation for Moldova in Kyiv. | | |
| Monaco | Brazil has a joint representation for Monaco in Paris. | | |
| Mongolia | Brazil has a joint representation for Mongolia in Beijing. | | |
| Montenegro | Brazil has a joint representation for Montenegro in Belgrade. | | |
| Morocco | Alexandre Guido Lopes Parola | Rabat | 4 July 2023 |
| Mozambique | Ademar Seabra da Cruz Junior | Maputo | 1 June 2022 |
| Myanmar | Gustavo Rocha de Menezes | Yangon | 20 September 2023 |
| Namibia | Diego Cunha Kullmann, Chargé d'Affaires a.i. | Windhoek | |
| Nauru | Brazil has a joint representation for Nauru in Canberra. | | |
| Nepal | Carlos Alberto Michaelsen den Hartog | Kathmandu | 23 September 2020 |
| Netherlands | Fernando Simas Magalhães | The Hague | 31 May 2023 |
| New Zealand | Marcos Arbizu de Souza Campos | Wellington | 8 July 2021 |
| Nicaragua | Vacant since 8 August 2024; Patrick Petiot, Chargé d'Affaires a.i. | Managua | |
| Niger | Brazil has a joint representation for Niger in Cotonou. | | |
| Nigeria | Carlos José Areias Moreno Garcete | Abuja | 19 June 2024 |
| North Korea | Luís Felipe Silvério Fortuna | Pyongyang | July 2018 |
| North Macedonia | Brazil has a joint representation for North Macedonia in Sofia. | | |
| Norway | Rodrigo de Azeredo Santos | Oslo | 10 July 2024 |
| Oman | Alfredo Cesar Martinho Leoni | Muscat | 12 December 2023 |
| Pakistan | Olyntho Vieira | Islamabad | 26 March 2019 |
| Palau | Brazil has a joint representation for Palau in Manila. | | |
| Palestine | João Marcelo Queiroz Soares | Ramallah | |
| Panama | Guilherme Frazão Conduru | Panama City | |
| Papua New Guinea | Brazil has a joint representation for Papua New Guinea in Canberra. | | |
| Paraguay | José Antônio Marcondes de Carvalho | Asunción | 15 December 2021 |
| Peru | Clemente de Lima Baena Soares | Lima | 24 May 2023 |
| Philippines | Gilberto Fonseca Guimarães de Moura | Manila | 13 September 2023 |
| Poland | Haroldo de Macedo Ribeiro | Wraclaw | 1 December 2021 |
| Portugal | Raimundo Carreiro Silva | Lisbon | 30 November 2021 |
| Puerto Rico | Brazil has a representation for Puerto Rico in Miami. | | |
| Qatar | Marcelo Otávio Dantas Loures da Costa | Doha | 13 September 2023 |
| Romania | Ricardo de Guerra Araújo | Bucarest | 21 June 2023 |
| Russia | Sérgio Rodrigues dos Santos | Moscow | 21 May 2025 |
| Rwanda | Brazil has a joint representation for Rwanda in Nairobi. | | |
| Saint Kitts and Nevis | Brazil has closed this embassy in 2019. | | |
| Saint Lucia | Brazil has closed this embassy in 2019. | | |
| Saint Vincent and the Grenadines | Brazil has closed this embassy in 2019. | | |
| Samoa | Brazil has a joint representation for Samoa in Wellington. | | |
| San Marino | Brazil has a joint representation for San Marino in Rome. | | |
| São Tomé and Príncipe | Pedro Luiz Dalcero | São Tomé | 1 June 2022 |
| Saudi Arabia | Paulo Uchôa Ribeiro Filho | Riyadh | 21 May 2025 |
| Senegal | Daniella Xavier Cesar | Dakar | 10 December 2024 |
| Serbia | Maria Clara de Abreu Rada | Belgrade | 10 June 2025 |
| Seychelles | Brazil has a joint representation for Seychelles in Dar es Salaam. | | |
| Sierra Leone | Brazil has a joint representation for Sierra Leone in Accra. | | |
| Singapore | Luciano Mazza de Andrade | Singapore | 10 July 2024 |
| Slovakia | Gabriel Boff Moreira | Bratislava | 31 May 2023 |
| Slovenia | Maria Izabel Vieira | Ljubljana | 10 December 2024 |
| Solomon Islands | Brazil has a joint representation for Solomon Islands in Canberra. | | |
| Somalia | Brazil has a joint representation for Somalia in Nairobi. | | |
| South Africa | Benedicto Fonseca Filho | Pretoria | 23 November 2022 |
| South Korea | Márcia Donner Abreu | Seoul | 14 December 2021 |
| South Sudan | Brazil has a joint representation for South Sudan in Addis Ababa. | | |
| Spain | Luiz Alberto Figueiredo Machado | Madrid | 8 July 2025 |
| Sri Lanka | Sergio Luiz Canaes | Colombo | 12 November 2019 |
| Sudan | Rubem Guimarães Coan Fabro Amaral | Khartoum | 22 November 2022 |
| Suriname | Felipe Costi Santarosa | Paramaribo | 10 December 2024 |
| Sweden | Maria Edileuza Fontenele Reis | Stockholm | 13 September 2023 |
| Switzerland | Cláudia Fonseca Buzzi | Bern | 8 July 2025 |
| Syria | João Carlos Falzeta Zanini, Chargé d'Affaires a.i. | Damascus | |
| Taiwan | Brazil has only a commercial office in Taipei. | | |
| Tajikistan | Brazil has a joint representation for Tajikistan in Islamabad. | | |
| Tanzania | Gustavo Martins Nogueira | Dar es Salaam | 23 November 2022 |
| Thailand | Matias Antonio Senra de Vilhena, Chargé d'Affaires a.i. | Bangkok | |
| Togo | Luisivan Vellar Strelow, Chargé d'Affaires a.i. | Lomé | |
| Tonga | Brazil has a joint representation for Tonga in Wellington. | | |
| Trinidad and Tobago | Maria Elisa Teófilo de Luna | Port of Spain | 11 June 2025 |
| Tunisia | Fernando José Marroni de Abreu | Tunis | 22 November 2022 |
| Turkey | Gilda Motta Santos Neves | Ankara | 10 December 2024 |
| Turkmenistan | Brazil has a joint representation for Turkmenistan in Astana. | | |
| Tuvalu | Brazil has a joint representation for Tuvalu in Wellington. | | |
| Uganda | Brazil has a joint representation for Uganda in Nairobi. | | |
| Ukraine | Rafael de Mello Vidal | Kyiv | 10 July 2024 |
| United Arab Emirates | Sidney Leon Romeiro | Abu Dhabi | 4 July 2023 |
| United Kingdom | Antônio de Aguiar Patriota | London | 23 May 2023 |
| United States | Maria Luiza Ribeiro Viotti | Washington, D.C. | 17 May 2023 |
| Uruguay | Marcos Leal Raposo Lopes | Montevideo | 30 November 2021 |
| Uzbekistan | Brazil has a joint representation for Uzbekistan in Moscow. | | |
| Vanuatu | Brazil has a joint representation for Vanuatu in Canberra. | | |
| Venezuela | Glivânia Maria de Oliveira | Caracas | 14 December 2023 |
| Vietnam | Marco Farani | Hanoi | 23 November 2022 |
| Yemen | Brazil has a joint representation for Yemen in Riyadh. | | |
| Zambia | Arthur Henrique Villanova Nogueira | Lusaka | 31 May 2023 |
| Zimbabwe | Vilmar Rogeiro Coutinho Junior | Harare | 1 June 2022 |

== Ambassadors to international organizations ==
| Host organization | Ambassador | Location | Confirmed |
|---|---|---|---|
| Community of Portuguese Language Countries | Juliano Féres Nascimento | Lisbon, Portugal | 1 June 2022 |
| European Union | Pedro Miguel da Costa e Silva | Brussels, Belgium | 2 December 2021 |
| Food and Agriculture Organization | Carla Barroso Carneiro | Rome, Italy | 22 November 2022 |
| International Fund for Agricultural Development | Carla Barroso Carneiro | Rome, Italy | 22 November 2022 |
| World Food Programme | Carla Barroso Carneiro | Rome, Italy | 22 November 2022 |
| International Atomic Energy Agency | Claudia Vieira Santos | Vienna, Austria | 4 July 2023 |
| International Civil Aviation Organization | Michel Arslanian Neto | Montreal, Quebec, Canada | 24 May 2023 |
| Latin American Integration Association | Antonio José Ferreira Simões | Montevideo, Uruguay | 14 November 2021 |
| Southern Common Market | Antonio José Ferreira Simões | Montevideo, Uruguay | 14 November 2021 |
| Organization of American States | Benoni Belli | Washington, D.C., United States | 24 May 2023 |
| United Nations | Sérgio França Danese | New York, United States | 17 May 2023 |
| United Nations Educational, Scientific and Cultural Organization | Paula Alves de Souza | Paris, France | 22 November 2022 |
