= Claudio Raja Gabaglia Lins =

Brazilian diplomat

His Excellency Claudio Raja Gabaglia Lins

Ambassador of Brazil to Pakistan
- In office August 2015 – January 2020
- President: Dilma Rousseff; Michel Temer; Jair Bolsonaro
- Vice President: Michel Temer; Hamilton Mourão
- Preceded by: Alfredo Leoni
- Succeeded by: Olyntho Vieira

Ambassador of Brazil to the Bahamas
- Incumbent
- Assumed office March 2020
- President: Jair Bolsonaro
- Vice President: Hamilton Mourão

Personal details
- Occupation: Diplomat

Claudio Raja Gabaglia Lins is a Brazilian diplomat who served as Brazil's ambassador to Pakistan from 21 August 2015 until January 2020. On 12 March 2020, Lins presented his credentials as Brazil's ambassador to The Bahamas, serving in that position until June 2026. On 24 June 2026, he assumed office as Brazil’s ambassador to Nepal.

During his tenure as envoy in Islamabad, Lins played a key role in expanding Brazil's economic cooperation with Pakistan. He oversaw the establishment of the Pakistan-Brazil Business Forum, which helped to enhance trade and investment ties. Additionally, he worked to strengthen diplomatic and cultural relations between Brazil and Pakistan during his tenure in Islamabad.
