= Frederico Meyer =

Brazilian diplomat (born 1953 or 1954)

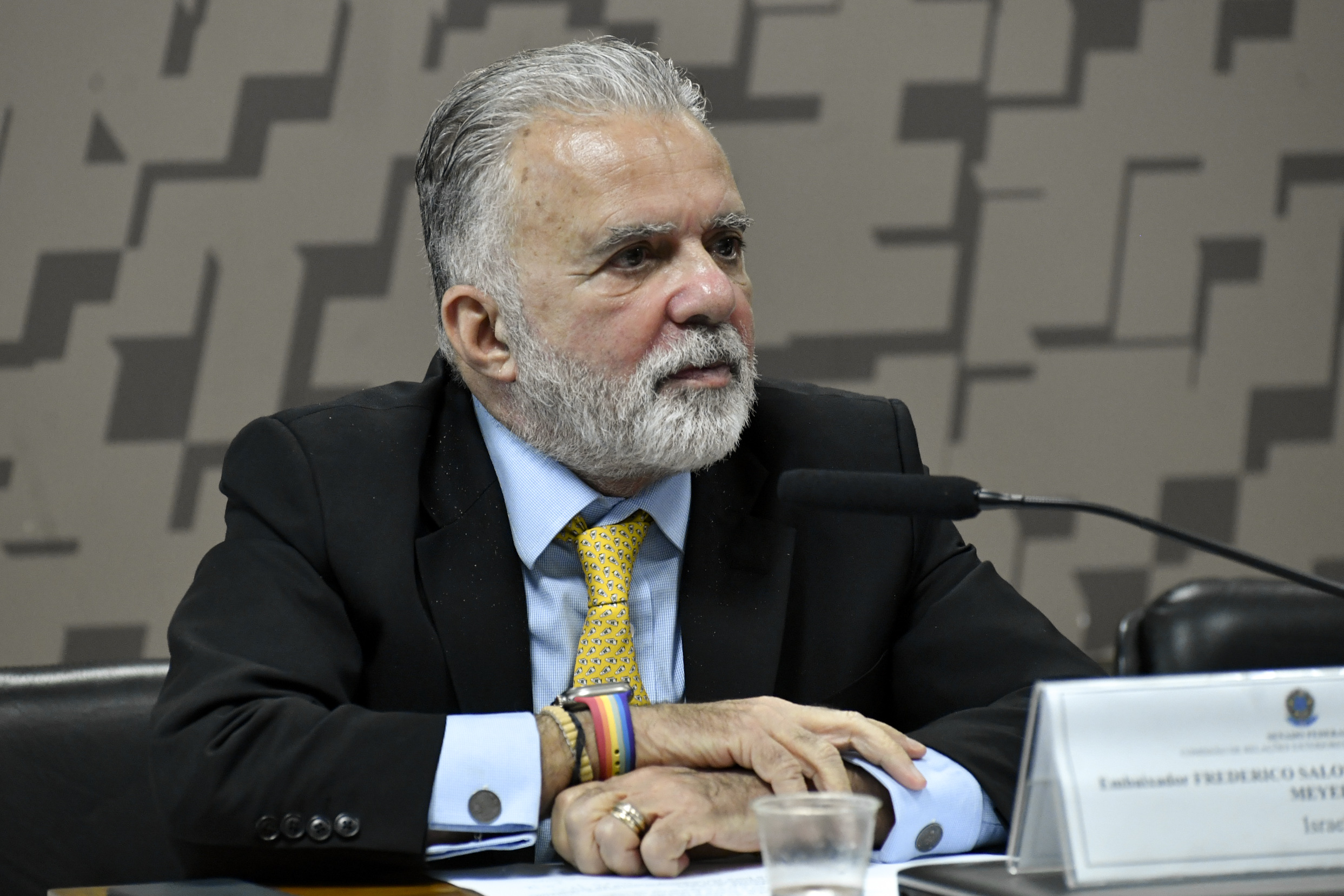
Meyer in May 2023

Frederico Salomão Duque Estrada Meyer (born 1953 or 1954 in Rio de Janeiro) is a former ambassador of Brazil and diplomat.

Meyer began his diplomatic career in 1978 and served in the Brazilian embassies in Iraq, the Soviet Union, Guyana, and Cuba. He was Brazil's ambassador to Kazakhstan from 2006 to 2011 and was the ambassador to Morocco from 2011 to 2015. He has also been the spokesperson for the Ministry of Foreign Affairs (2015–2016) and Alternate Ambassador at the Brazilian Mission to the United Nations in New York (2017–2019). Previously, he served in Baghdad (1980–1983), Moscow (1985–1989), Geneva (1989–1993), Georgetown (1993), Havana (1995–1998), Geneva (1998–2003), and New York (2003–2006).

In 2023, he became the ambassador to Israel. He was recalled and designated a persona non grata in Israel in 2024 after the Brazilian president Lula da Silva likened the ongoing war in Gaza to the Holocaust.
