= Henrique Valle =

Brazilian diplomat

Henrique Rodrigues Valle, Jr
- Henrique Valle at the Brazilian Mission to the United Nations, 2005
- Occupation: Diplomat

Henrique Rodrigues Valle, Jr, born in Rio de Janeiro, Brazil, is a Brazilian diplomat. He was the Deputy Permanent Representative of Brazil to the United Nations from 1996 to 1999, and from 2002 to 2006. Prior to being appointed to this position, he was the Ambassador of Brazil to Canada from 1999 to 2003. He graduated from the Instituto Rio Branco, the Brazilian Diplomatic Academy in 1962.
