= Marcos Galvão (diplomat) =

Brazilian diplomat

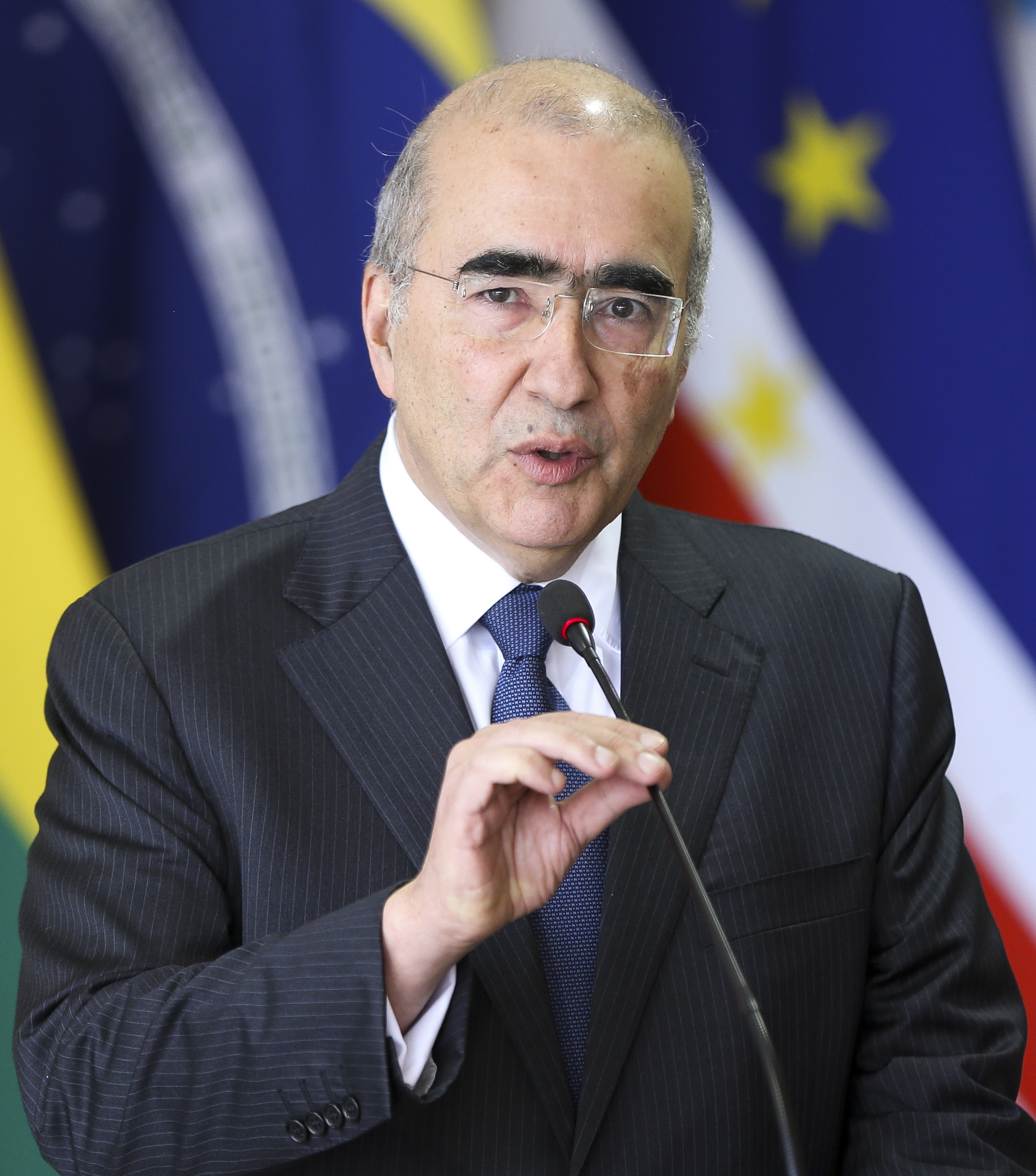

Brazilian Ambassador to China
- Incumbent
- Assumed office 22 August 2022
- President: Jair Bolsonaro; Luiz Inácio Lula da Silva
- Preceded by: Paulo Estivallet de Mesquita

Brazilian Ambassador to the European Union
- In office 3 February 2019 – July 2022
- President: Jair Bolsonaro
- Preceded by: Everton Vieira Vargas
- Succeeded by: Pedro Miguel da Costa e Silva

Minister of Foreign Affairs Acting
- In office 22 February 2017 – 7 March 2017
- President: Michel Temer
- Preceded by: José Serra
- Succeeded by: Aloysio Nunes

Personal details
- Born: Marcos Bezerra Abbott Galvão; 14 January 1959 (age 67) New York, New York, U.S.
- Spouse: Ana Maria Bueno Doria Abbott Galvão
- Children: 2
- Parents: Fernando Abbott Galvão (father); Sônia Bezerra Galvão (mother)
- Education: Rio Branco Institute (BIS); American University (MIA)

Marcos Bezerra Abbott Galvão (born 14 January 1959) is a Brazilian diplomat, current Ambassador to the People's Republic of China and former Ambassador to the European Union in Brussels, Belgium. From 22 February 2017 to 7 March 2017, Galvão was Acting Minister of Foreign Affairs.

== Biography ==
Born in 1959, Galvão graduated at Rio Branco Institute, the Brazilian diplomatic academy, and concluded his master's degree in International Affairs at American University in Washington D.C., in the United States. Joined the diplomatic career, as third secretary, on 2 September 1980.

In the Ministry of Foreign Affairs, he acted in many offices, such as advisor to the secretary general (1982–84) and Deputy Chief of Staff and Press Secretary of the Minister (1998–2001). In other government agencies, he served in the Diplomatic Advisory office of the Presidency of the Republic (1990–92), advisor for the Minister of Finances (1994), Chief of Staff of the Ministry of the Environment (1993–94) and of the Ministry of Finances (2005–07). Galvão was Secretary of Foreign Affairs of the Ministry of Finances and main negotiator for the Ministry in the process of the G20 (2008–10). He was Secretary-General of Foreign Affairs (deputy Foreign Minister) from 25 May 2016 to 31 December 2018.

In foreign countries, Galvão served in the Brazilian Mission to the Organization of American States, in Washington D.C. (1984–87), in the Embassy of Asunción, Paraguay (1987–89), the Embassy of London, UK (1995–98) and the Embassy of Washington D.C., U.S. (2001–05), where he was minister-advisor and Chargé d'Affaires. From January 2011 to October 2013, he was Brazilian Ambassador to Japan and, after that, Brazilian permanent representative to the World Trade Organization (WTO) and other economic organizations in Geneva (2013–16). Since February 2019 he is the ambassador of Brazil to the European Union.

He taught many courses in Rio Branco Institute, such as Diplomatic Language and Brazilian Foreign Politics.

In May 2018, Galvão was nominated by president Michel Temer as Brazilian Ambassador to the European Union. The nomination was approved by the Federal Senate in the same month.

== See also ==
- Ministry of Foreign Affairs
- Ambassadors of Brazil

Diplomatic posts
Preceded by Everton Vieira Vargas	Brazilian Ambassador to the European Union; 2019–2022	Succeeded by Pedro Miguel da Costa e Silva
Preceded by Pedro Estivallet de Mesquita	Brazilian Ambassador to China; 2022–present	Incumbent
Political offices
Preceded by José Serra	Minister of Foreign Affairs; Acting; 2017	Succeeded by Aloysio Nunes
