= Ernesto Araújo =

Brazilian diplomat and former Minister of Foreign Affairs

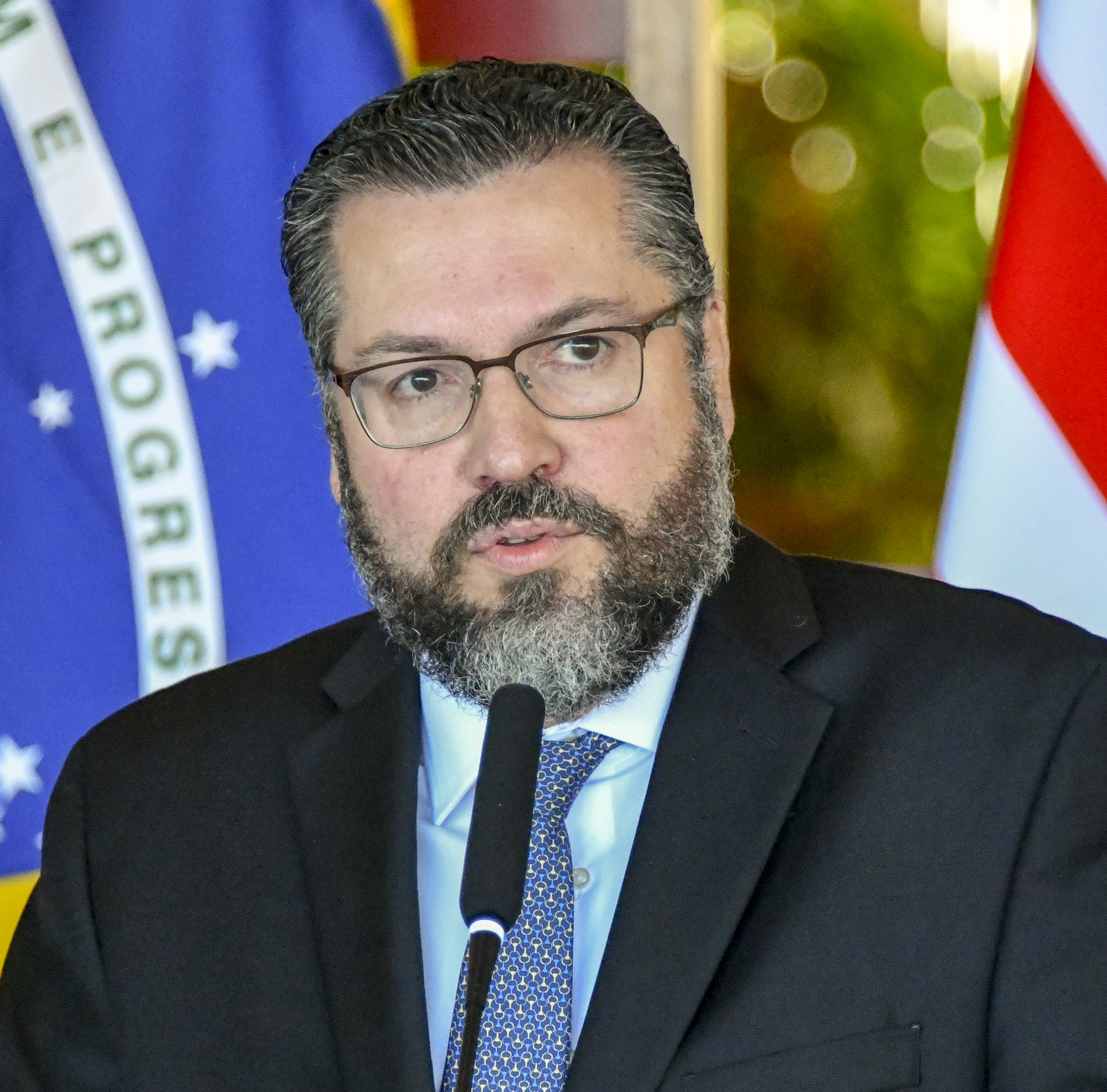
- Araújo in 2019

Minister of Foreign Affairs
- In office 1 January 2019 – 29 March 2021
- President: Jair Bolsonaro
- Preceded by: Aloysio Nunes
- Succeeded by: Carlos Alberto França

Personal details
- Born: Ernesto Henrique Fraga Araújo; 15 May 1967 (age 59) Porto Alegre, Rio Grande do Sul, Brazil
- Education: University of Brasília; Rio Branco Institute
- Occupation: Diplomat

Ernesto Henrique Fraga Araújo (born 15 May 1967) is a Brazilian diplomat and Brazil's former Minister of Foreign Affairs. Chosen by Brazil's president Jair Bolsonaro in January 2019 following a suggestion made by Olavo de Carvalho, Araújo subscribes to theories such as man-made climate change is untrue and a "communist plot", "globalism" is a process driven by "cultural Marxism", and the COVID-19 pandemic is the result of another communist plot he dubbed "comunavirus".

== Career ==
Araújo is a career diplomat at the Ministry of Foreign Affairs (often called Itamaraty after its headquarters). He served in Itamaraty's division of Mercosur affairs from 1991 to 1995, from 2007 to July 2010 and from 2010 to 2015 he was deputy chief at the Brazilian Embassies in Ottawa and in Washington, D.C., respectively. In June 2018, he was promoted to the rank of First Class Minister in the Brazilian Foreign Service, a career diplomat's top rank, that allows them to be posted as Ambassadors. In the custom of the Brazilian Foreign Service, First Class Ministers are styled "Ambassador" even when they have not yet assumed the direction of an embassy, as was the case with Araújo.

=== Foreign Affairs Minister (2019–21) ===
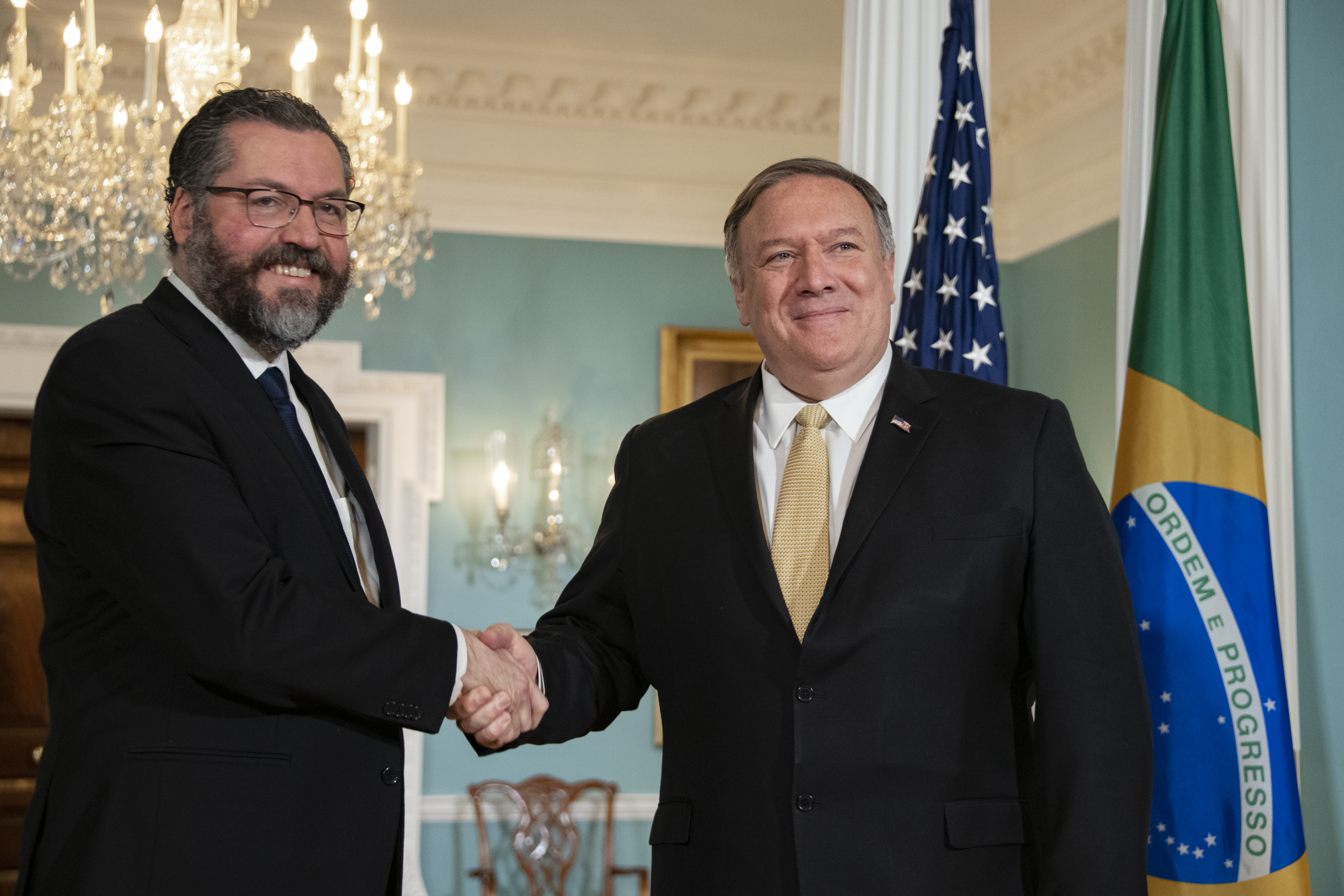
Araújo (left) meets with U.S. Secretary of State Mike Pompeo in April 2019

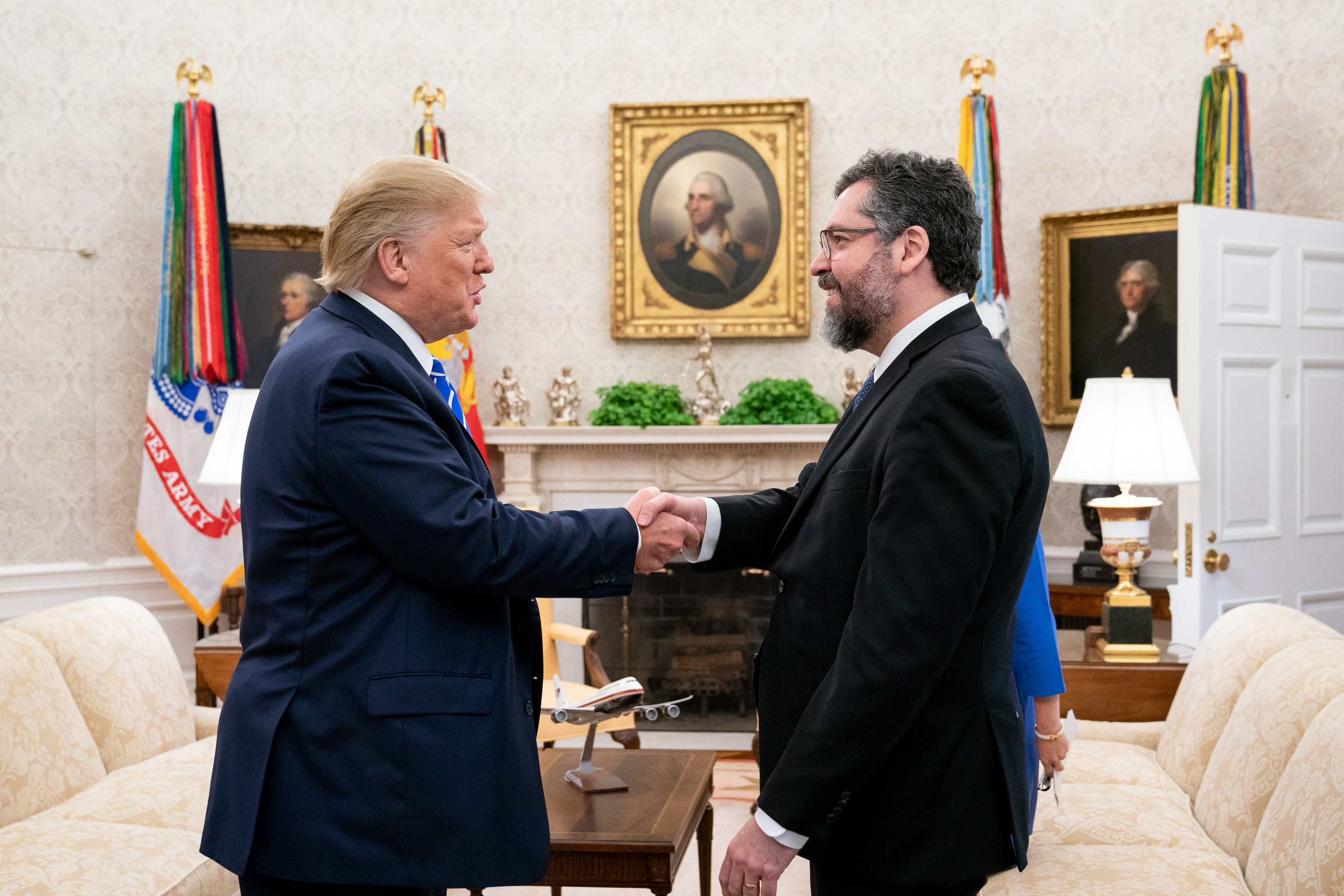
Araújo with U.S. President Donald Trump in the Oval Office, 30 August 2019

After the election of Jair Bolsonaro as President of Brazil in October 2018, the newly promoted Ambassador Araújo was chosen to be the Foreign Minister in the new Administration. The choice was considered unusual. Araújo was not an influential member of Itamaraty, being described by The Economist as "hitherto-obscure diplomat", and got the job after a suggestion by Olavo de Carvalho. An anonymous group of Brazilian diplomats published a manifesto lamenting his appointment and claiming Araújo is "manifestly unprepared" and holds "ridiculous" and "absurd" opinions. Others, also speaking anonymously, described him as an "extremely scholarly man", with profound knowledge of ancient history.

Araújo assumed office as foreign minister on 1 January 2019. On 8 January 2019, he asked diplomats to inform the UN that Brazil had withdrawn from the Global Compact for Migration. Araújo resigned from office on 29 March 2021, after pressure from Brazilian senators due to his behaviour with foreign partners, specifically China.

== Positions ==
During the PT administrations, Araújo publicly supported the core elements of Lula da Silva's and Dilma Rousseff's foreign policy. In 2008, for instance, he criticized those who called their progressive agenda "ideological" and defended the right of Hugo Chávez's Venezuela to be a member of Mercosur.

More recently, he began to state opinions that apparently denied his own previous positions. In a 2017 article published by the International Relations Research Institute (IPRI), Araújo praised U.S. President Donald Trump for his nationalist rhetoric and holds that he is restoring Western values that have been challenged by nihilism, which he believes is the Western enemy that replaced communism. In the same article, he praises the self-declared neo-fascist political analyst Aleksandr Dugin, whose books, according to Araújo, "should be studied". According to Paulo Roberto de Almeida, a senior Brazilian diplomat, Araújo's apparent ideological U-turn was a "deliberate" move to please Olavo de Carvalho and "get the job" in the Bolsonaro administration.

Araújo also maintains a blog entitled "Metapolitics 17 – Against Globalism", where he writes that globalism "is the economic globalization that has been driven by cultural Marxism" and that is "essentially anti-human and anti-Christian". On his blog, Araújo has also claimed that climate change is a "cultural Marxism" plot to undermine Western countries in order to support China's growth, and has also lamented the "criminalisation" of red meat, oil and heterosexual sex.

He has also claimed that Nazism was a leftist movement. His statement was criticised by German historians and scholars, such as Stefanie Schüler-Springorum and Wulf Kansteiner, as "nonsense" and "scientifically absurd".

He has called for Brazil to build a new alliance with the United States, Russia, Serbia, India, Italy, Japan and the Visegrád Group nations.

== Personal life ==
Araújo was born in Porto Alegre on 15 May 1967. He graduated from the University of Brasília, where he studied linguistics and literature, and was trained as a diplomat at the Rio Branco Institute. Araújo is a practising Roman Catholic.

His father, Henrique Fonseca de Araújo, worked as an Attorney General of the Brazilian military dictatorship. During his tenure, Henrique Fonseca de Araújo acted to prevent Gustav Franz Wagner, a Nazi official and deputy commander of the Sobibór extermination camp, from being extradited to Germany. After the War, Wagner had managed to escape to Brazil, where he died some years after having his extradition denied by the Brazilian dictatorship. In his blog, Araújo defended his father, saying that he was not a Nazi supporter and only acted according to the "rule of law".

Political offices
Preceded by Aloysio Nunes	Minister of Foreign Affairs; 2019–21	Succeeded by Carlos Alberto França
