= Angola–Argentina relations =

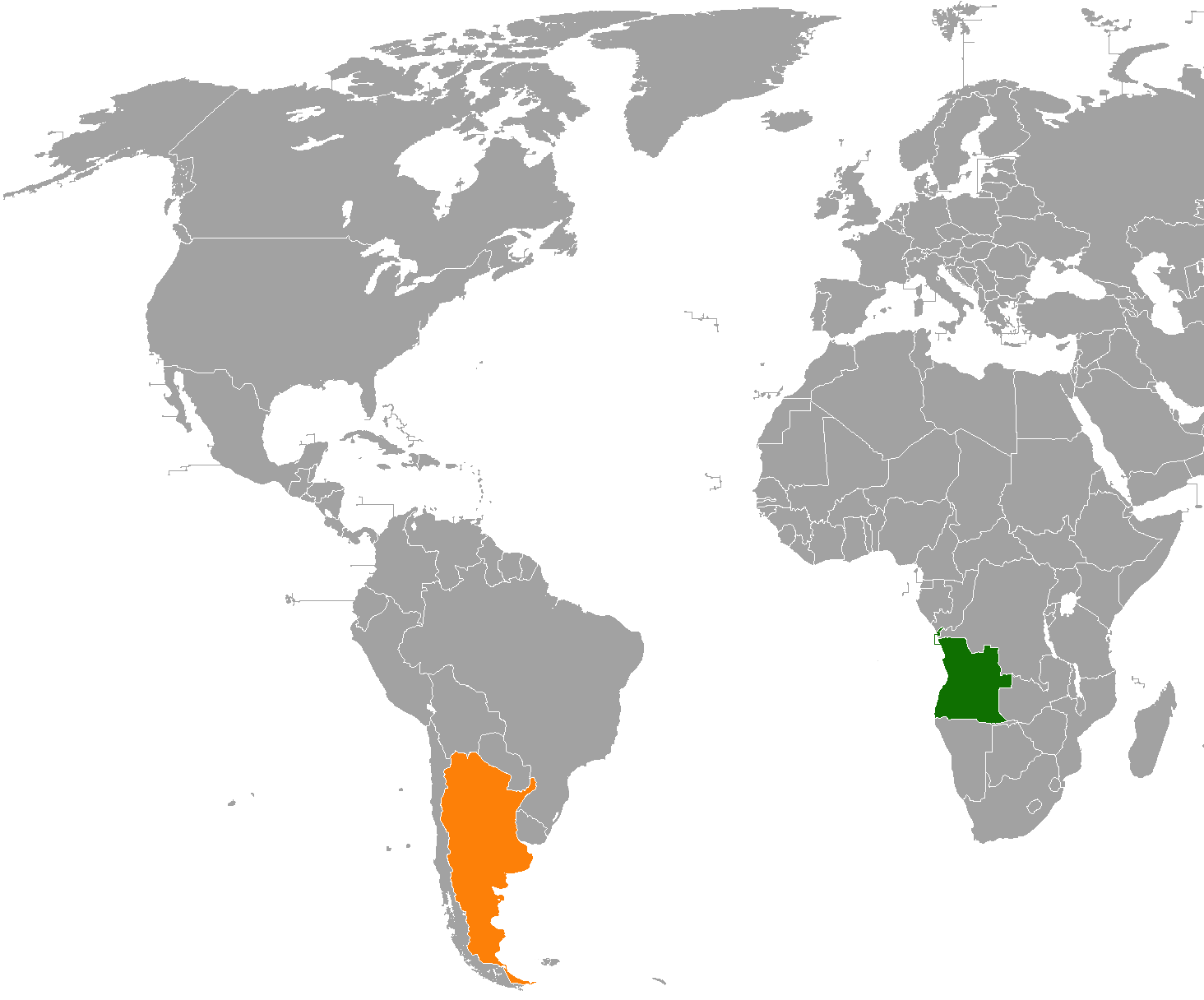
- Angola: Argentina

The Republic of Angola and the Argentine Republic are members of the Group of 77 and the United Nations.

== History ==
During the Atlantic slave trade, Portugal and Spain transported many African slaves from Angola to Brazil, and from there were transported to Argentina. During the Angolan War of Independence, the Argentine-Cuban commander Ernesto Che Guevara met with Agostinho Neto (leader of the MPLA and future president of Angola) in Brazzaville for his participation as commander of the Angolan troops, and for the sending of Cuban troops in the conflict, during his tour in Africa, to then participate of the Simba Rebellion during the Congo Crisis in Zaire (currently the Democratic Republic of the Congo), which years later, the war ended on April 25, 1974 with the fall of the New State of Portugal ann with the liberation of all the Portuguese colonies in Africa and East Timor from the Carnation Revolution and later, with the Transfer of sovereignty of Macau. The following year and months later, on November 11, 1975, Angola gained its independence from Portugal. In September 1977, Argentina recognized the independence and established diplomatic relations with Angola.

Soon after gaining independence, Angola entered into a civil war which lasted until 2002. In 1985, Argentine Foreign Minister, Dante Caputo, paid a visit to Angola. In May 2005, Angolan President, José Eduardo dos Santos, paid an official visit to Argentina. In May 2012, Argentine President, Cristina Fernández de Kirchner, paid an official visit to Angola.

In November 2025, during Angola's celebrations of its 50th anniversary of independence, the country's football federation invited the Argentina national team to visit Luanda and play a friendly match against the Angola national team. The match ended in a 2-0 victory for Argentina.

== High-level visits ==
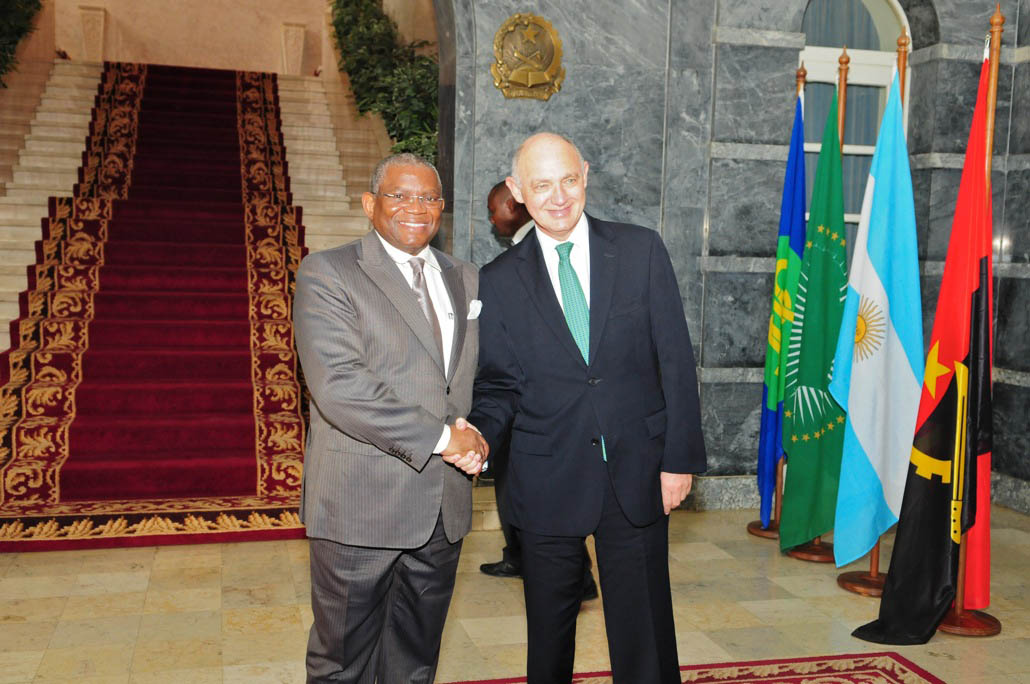
Angolan Foreign Minister Georges Rebelo Chikoti and Argentine Foreign Minister Héctor Timerman in Luanda; March 2012.

High-level visits from Angola to Argentina

- President José Eduardo dos Santos (2005)
- Foreign Secretary of State Rui Mangueira (2011)
- Foreign Minister Georges Rebelo Chikoti (2013)
- Deputy Foreign Minister Manuel Domingos Augusto (2015)

High-level visits from Argentina to Angola

- Foreign Minister Dante Caputo (1985, 1988)
- Foreign Minister Héctor Timerman (2012)
- President Cristina Fernández de Kirchner (2012)

== Bilateral agreements ==
Both nations have signed a few bilateral agreement such as an Agreement on trade (1983); Agreement on Economic, Technical, Scientific and Cultural Cooperation (1998); Memorandum of Understanding on Agriculture (2004); Agreement regarding Consultations on Matters of Common Interest (2005); Agreement on Economic and Trade Cooperation (2005); Agreement of Cooperation in Agriculture and Livestock (2005); and an Agreement for the Elimination of Visas in Diplomatic and Service Passport Holders (2012).

== Resident diplomatic missions ==
- Angola has an embassy in Buenos Aires.
- Argentina has an embassy in Luanda.

== See also ==
- Afro-Argentines
- Angolan Argentine
