= Mauro Vieira =

Brazilian diplomat (born 1951)

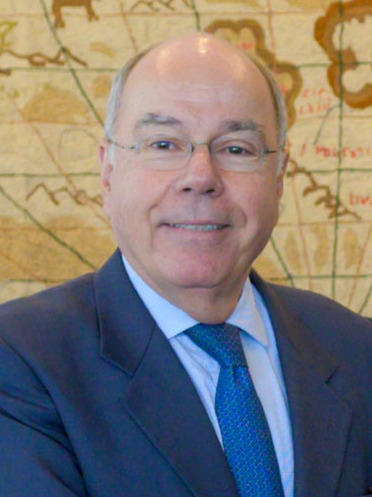
- Vieira in 2023

Minister of Foreign Affairs
- Incumbent
- Assumed office 1 January 2023
- President: Luiz Inácio Lula da Silva
- Preceded by: Carlos Alberto França
- In office 1 January 2015 – 12 May 2016
- President: Dilma Rousseff
- Preceded by: Luiz Alberto Figueiredo
- Succeeded by: José Serra

Diplomatic posts
- 2020–2022: Ambassador to Croatia
- 2016–2020: Permanent Representative to the United Nations
- 2010–2014: Ambassador to the United States
- 2004–2010: Ambassador to Argentina

Personal details
- Born: Mauro Luiz Iecker Vieira; 15 February 1951 (age 75) Niterói, State of Rio de Janeiro, Brazil
- Education: Fluminense Federal University (LL.B.)

Mauro Luiz Iecker Vieira (born 15 February 1951) is a Brazilian diplomat serving as Minister of Foreign Affairs of Brazil since 1 January 2023 under President Luiz Inácio Lula da Silva. Vieira occupied the same office between 2015 and 2016 during President Dilma Rousseff's second term.

== Biography ==
Vieira was born in Niterói. He has a bachelor's degree in law from the Fluminense Federal University (UFF), and graduated from the Brazilian diplomatic academy, the Rio Branco Institute, in 1974.

== Career ==
As a career diplomat he served at the Brazilian embassy in Washington, D.C., from 1978 to 1982 and at the Brazilian Mission to the Latin American Integration Association (ALADI) in Montevideo from 1982 to 1985. After a period back in Brasília, he then served at the Brazilian embassy in Mexico City (1990-1992) and at the Embassy in Paris (1995-1999).

He was nominated Brazil's ambassador to Argentina in Buenos Aires from 2004 to 2010 and since then was the Brazilian Ambassador to the United States until President Dilma Rousseff announced his nomination as Foreign Minister on 31 December 2014.

He has worked at other federal agencies including being Assistant Secretary General at the Ministry of Science and Technology and National Administration Secretary in the Ministry of Social Security and Assistance.

Vieira was appointed as the Minister of Foreign Affairs of Brazil at the beginning of 2023, under the administration of Luiz Inácio Lula da Silva.

During the Russian invasion of Ukraine, the International Criminal Court (ICC) issued an arrest warrant for Russian President Vladimir Putin, following which Vieira stated Putin would face the risk of arrest if he entered Brazil. In December 2023, when asked, given that Brazil is a signatory to the Rome Statute, Putin would be arrested if he comes to Brazil, he said: "We have to see this in each case... I don't know. I don't think so. I also hope not. I don't know. We will not take any initiative to make this happen ... there must be an order" for such a step.

In March 2024, Vieira visited Ramallah in the West Bank. He condemned the Israeli blockade of the Gaza Strip and the bombing of Gaza during the Gaza war.

== Honours ==
- Brazil: Grand Officer of the Order of Military Merit (O.M.M.) (2005)
- Guyana: Member of the Order of Roraima (O.R.) (2016)
- Spain: Grand Cross of the Order of Civil Merit (11 July 2003)

Diplomatic posts
| Preceded by José Botafogo Gonçalves | Ambassador of Brazil to Argentina; 2004–2009 | Succeeded by Enio Cordeiro |
| Preceded by Antonio Patriota | Ambassador of Brazil to the United States; 2010–2014 | Succeeded by Luiz Alberto Figueiredo |
| Preceded by Antonio Patriota | Ambassador of Brazil to the United Nations; 2016–2020 | Succeeded by Ronaldo Costa Filho |
| Preceded by Paulo Roberto Campos | Ambassador of Brazil to Croatia; 2020–2022 | |
Political offices
| Preceded by Luiz Alberto Figueiredo | Minister of Foreign Affairs; 2015–2016 | Succeeded by José Serra |
| Preceded by Carlos Alberto França | Minister of Foreign Affairs; 2023–present | Incumbent |
