= Angolans in Brazil =

Angolano-brasileiros

Total population
- 17,294

Regions with significant populations
- Rio de Janeiro

Languages
- Portuguese (Angolan and Brazilian)

Religion
- Mainly Roman Catholicism

Related ethnic groups
- Angolan Americans, Angolan Argentine

There is a small but recognizable community of Angolans in Brazil consisting mainly of immigrants and expatriates from Angola. There are an estimated 17,294 Angolan citizens registered in Brazil, most Angolan citizens in the country are on student or work visas.

In addition to the modest number of Angolan expats currently residing in Brazil, millions of Afro-Brazilians have considerable Angolan ancestry as a result of the transatlantic slave trade shipping many slaves from Angola to Brazil.

== See also ==
- Brazilians in Angola
- Angola–Brazil relations
