= Angolan Argentines =

Angolano-argentinos (Portuguese) Angoleño-argentinos (Spanish)
- (Argentina) (Angola)

Total population
- 177 (by birth, 2022)

Regions with significant populations
- Minorities in Buenos Aires, Salta and Tucumán

Languages
- Spanish · Angolan Portuguese · Kongo · Kimbundu

Religion
- Roman Catholicism · Others

Related ethnic groups
- Angolans; Angolan Brazilians · Angolan Americans

Angolan Argentines (Spanish: Angoleño-argentinos) are Argentines of predominantly or total Angolan descent or an Angolan-born people who reside in Argentina. Most of them arrived as slaves during the Spanish colonial period (16th–19th centuries). Currently, Black Argentines descended from the colonial era have lost all connection to Africa and most ties to their past, and thus possess a distinct identity.

== History ==
Since the 15th century groups of African slaves were exported to Argentina. From the 16th century, most Africans brought to Argentina belonged to ethnic groups who speak Bantu languages, coming from the territories now comprising the Republic of Congo, the Democratic Republic of Congo, Angola and Mozambique. Many slaves of these countries were bought in Brazil, a country where most of the slaves were from these countries, especially from Angola. In 1680–1777 came at least 40,000 slaves in the region, while among the latter date and 1812, when traffic was halted, some 70,000 were landed in Buenos Aires and Montevideo (that figure must be added another, unknown, admitted slave overland from Rio Grande do Sul). The 22 percent of which came directly from Africa came from Congo and Angola. Actually left many more but one in five, on average, died on boats.

Of the four ports of western central Africa where slaves were shipped, Loango, Cabinda, Luanda and Benguela, the last three belong today to Angola and they named several groups of slaves in colonial rioplatenses (the Benguela, the Cabinda, etc.). These slaves were sold in ports, some were there and others were sent to the interior, where Cordoba, San Miguel de Tucuman and Salta were featured markets. Slaves worked on farms and ranches, were employed as domestic servants for wealthy families in cities or as workers in bakeries, mills, brick factories, and workshops of artisans. Others were hired as laborers, earning a salary and give it to their masters, keeping one hand. That allowed them to save money to seek access to the most sought throughout his life: freedom. The getting those who could buy it or those who received their masters, usually when they were old.

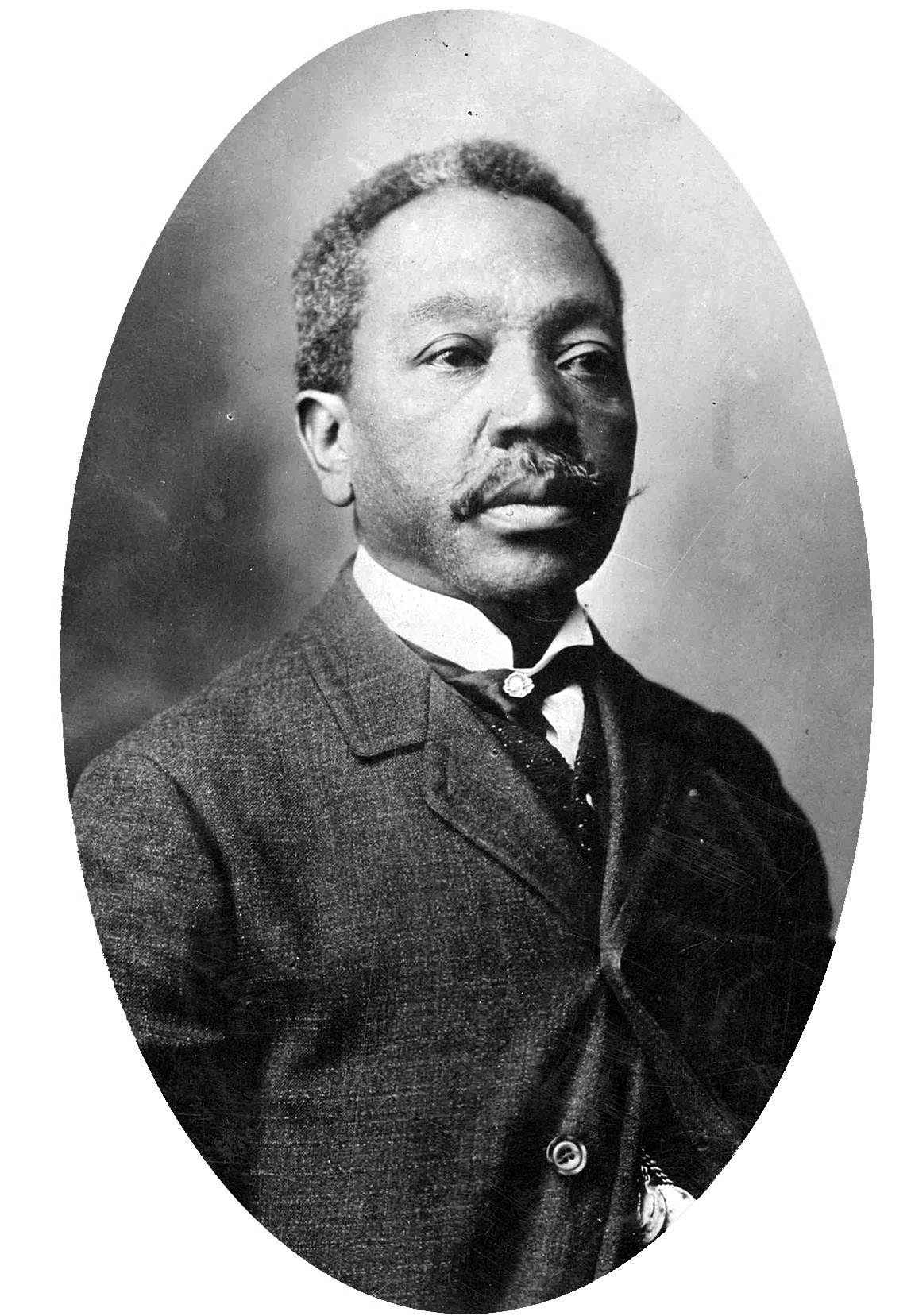
Gabino Ezeiza, one of the greatest performers in the art of the payada

After, the Revolution of 1810 banned the slave trade and then sanctioned freedom of wombs, but not abolished slavery, as did leaders favor the right of ownership over freedom. With the Revolutionary War, slave men were presented with an opportunity: those who entered the army had the promise of free exit to terminate service. Their participation was very important, particularly in the Army of the Andes, where they constituted the bulk of the infantry. This means that many Angolans were instrumental to ensure the independence of what became Argentina. In the colonial period, free blacks gathered in "nations" that grouped people who had been captured in the same region. In Buenos Aires protruded the slaves from the Congo and Angola. They met on Sundays in spaces called "bins" or "tangos", where they performed dances. After independence was replaced by "African Societies", controlled by the State, which raised funds to purchase the freedom of slaves, made loans, organized masses for the ancestors, and performed dances that recreated the bonds of community. Among these societies, the Benguela, Angola and the Cabinda had Angolan origin. Were thousands the Angolans arrived in Argentina.

== See also ==
- Afro-Argentines
- Angola–Argentina relations
- Immigration to Argentina
