= Brazilians in Angola =

Ethnic group in Angola

Brazilians in Angola Brasileiros em Angola
- (Brazil) (Angola)
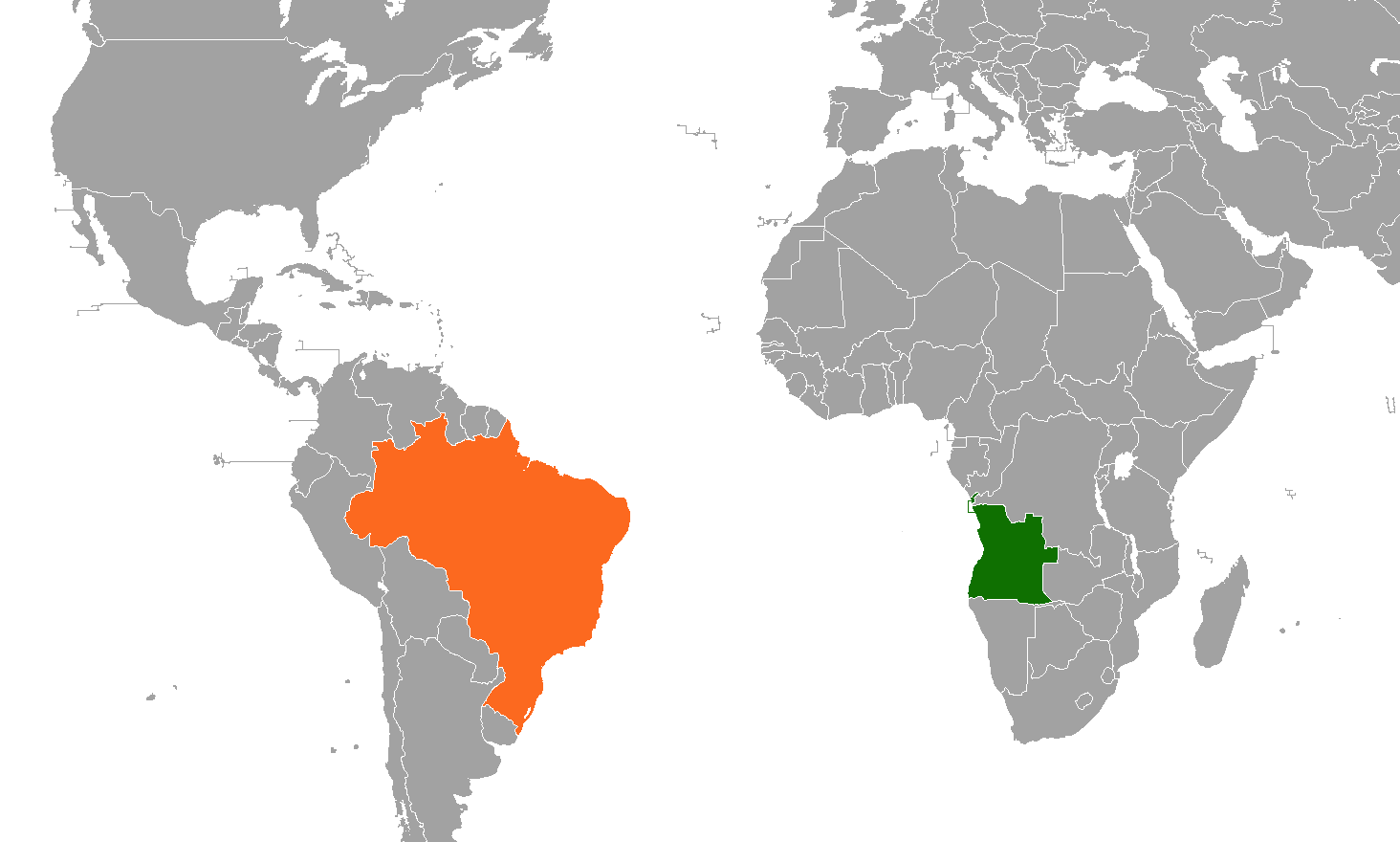

Total population
- 20,000

Regions with significant populations
- Cabinda · Luanda · Malanje

Languages
- Portuguese (Brazilian and Angolan)

Religion
- Predominantly Roman Catholicism some Protestantism · Atheism · Others

Related ethnic groups
- Brazilian diaspora

There is a small but recognizable community of Brazilians in Angola consisting mainly of immigrants and expatriates from Brazil. There are an estimated 15,000 Brazilians registered in Angola, mainly working for construction, mining and agribusiness companies.

== Overview ==
With the formation of the CPLP (Community of Portuguese Language Countries) in 1996 there has been an increase of Brazilian immigrants to Angola. Many of these are said to be white Brazilians looking for economic investments in the largely undeveloped country.

According to the "Association of Brazilian Companies in Angola", the presence of Brazilian companies in Angola has expanded on a par with the increase in trade. The number of Brazilian companies in Angola has increased by 70 percent over the last few years since 2002. The firms are mainly involved in public works, sales of construction materials, project design, real estate and food. Brazilians are thus beginning to flock to a country which, in spite of the historical and linguistic links, was virtually an unknown quantity until just over a decade ago. The 15,000 Brazilians registered in Angola live and work in the provinces of Cabinda, Lunda Norte and Malanje as well as in the capital, Luanda.

== See also ==
- Angola–Brazil relations
- Angolans in Brazil
