= Carlos Alberto França =

Brazilian diplomat, Minister of Foreign Affairs of Brazil (2021–2023)

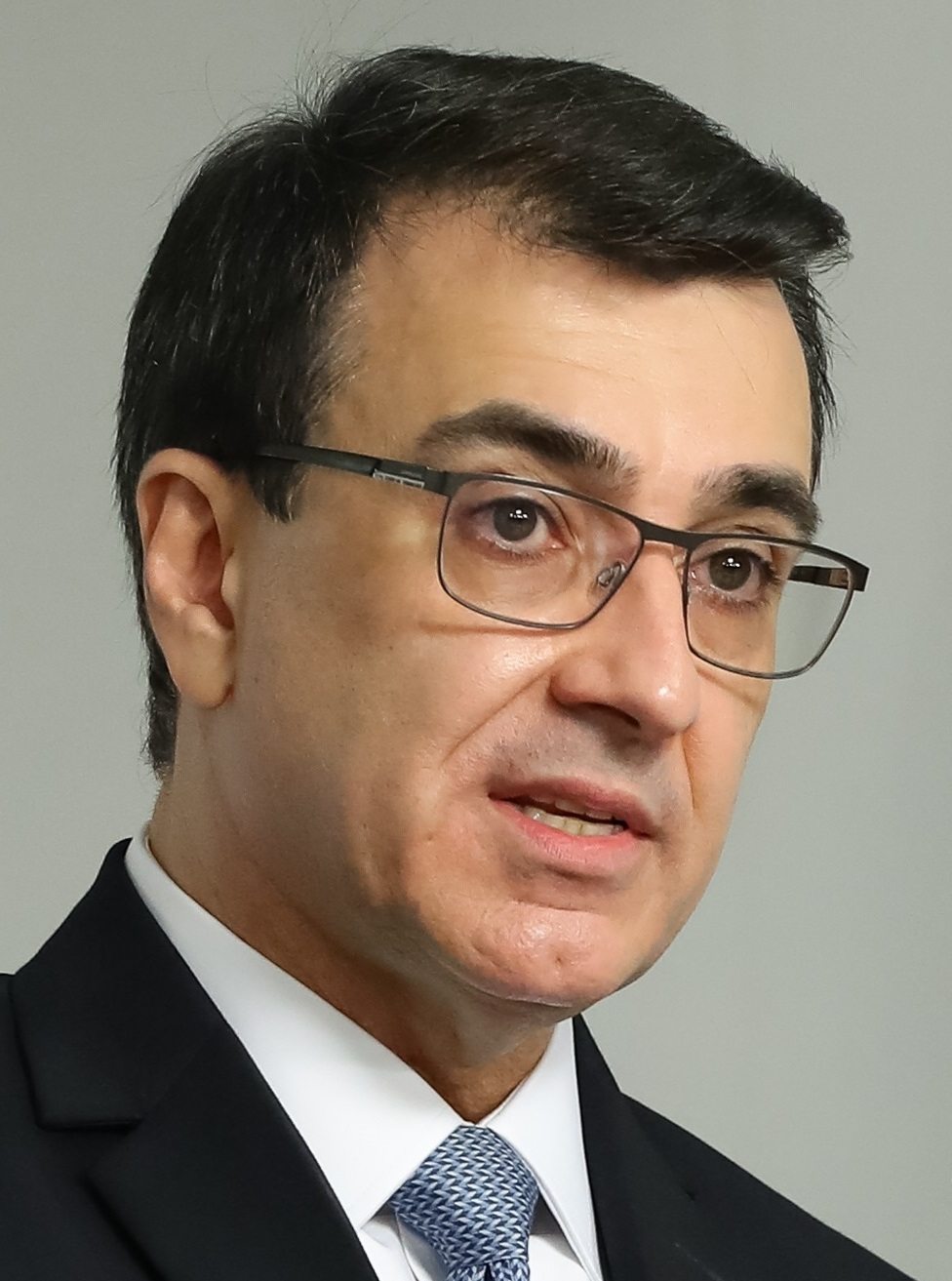
- França in April 2021

Minister of Foreign Affairs
- In office 29 March 2021 – 31 December 2022
- President: Jair Bolsonaro
- Preceded by: Ernesto Araújo
- Succeeded by: Mauro Vieira

Brazilian Ambassador to Canada
- Incumbent
- Assumed office 24 August 2023
- President: Luiz Inácio Lula da Silva
- Preceded by: Pedro Lopes Borio

Personal details
- Born: Carlos Alberto Franco França; 18 April 1964 (age 62) Goiânia, Goiás, Brazil
- Relatives: Siron Franco (uncle)
- Education: Rio Branco Institute; University of Brasília
- Occupation: Diplomat

Carlos Alberto Franco França (born 18 April 1964) is a Brazilian diplomat who served as Brazil's Minister of Foreign Affairs from 2021 to 2022. He was appointed by President Jair Bolsonaro on 29 March 2021 to replace outgoing Minister Ernesto Araújo.

== Early life and education ==
Born in the city of Goiânia, França is a career diplomat who graduated at Brazil's diplomatic academy Rio Branco Institute in 1991. He also holds a law degree from the University of Brasília. França is nephew of the Brazilian painter and sculptor Siron Franco.

== Career ==
Carlos Alberto França served in the missions of Brazil to the United States, Paraguay and Bolivia, having also held the position of Chief of Ceremonial of the Ministry of Foreign Affairs until 2019, when he was invited by President Jair Bolsonaro to assume the position of Chief of Ceremonial of the Brazilian Presidency. Before being appointed Minister, he held the position of Chief Advisor to the President.

França also held important positions in the diplomacy of the Former Presidents Fernando Henrique Cardoso, Dilma Rousseff and Michel Temer. He also worked in the private sector between 2015 and 2017, as Director of Corporate Affairs and Strategic Business at the Brazilian multinational conglomerate Andrade Gutierrez.

He wrote the book Electrical Integration Brazil-Bolivia: the encounter on the Madeira River in 2015, after accumulated experience while serving in the Brazilian embassy in that country.

== Minister of Foreign Affairs ==
França was appointed Minister of Foreign Affairs on 29 March 2021 to succeed outgoing minister Ernesto Araújo, who served since January 2019. Former Minister Araújo accumulated several diplomatic incidents with China, as well as criticisms from congressmen about his management of the Brazilian chancellery during the COVID-19 pandemic.

== Positions ==
According to diplomats, França will maintain Araújo's positions in relation to the United States and Israel, as well the alignment with OECD and the alliances with right-wing countries such as Poland and Hungary, other priorities will be the reforms of international organizations.

In the first days, the Minister seeks to change the command of the Secretariat of Asia, Pacific and Russia of the Ministry of Foreign Affairs, with a focus on improving relations with China and India, the main exporters of medical raw materials to Brazil, one of the hardest hit countries by the COVID-19 pandemic.

Regarding the environment, França is willing to collaborate with the U.S. and European countries, against deforestation in the Amazon. The country will remain as a signatory to the Paris Agreement, and will be committed to ending illegal deforestation in the Amazon by 2030. Brazil will be one of the main participants of the COP26 London in November 2021.

The Minister will also give priority to the relationship with Latin American neighbors, especially Mercosur, which in 2021 celebrates 30 years of creation.

== Awards and honours ==
França was awarded with the following foreign and national orders during his career:

=== Foreign honours ===
- Argentina: National Order of the Liberator General San Martín
- France: National Order of the Légion d'honneur
- Portugal: National Order of Prince Henry

=== National honours ===
- Order of Rio Branco (Grand Cross)
- Order of Defence Merit (Grand Cross) (Note: Portuguese: Ordem do Mérito da Defesa - Grã-Cruz)
- Order of Military Merit (Grand Cross - Grã-Cruz)
- Order of Aeronautical Merit (Grand Cross) (Note: Portuguese: Ordem do Mérito Aeronáutico - Grã-Cruz)

== Notes ==
Political offices
Preceded by Ernesto Araújo	Minister of Foreign Affairs; 2021–2023	Succeeded by Mauro Vieira
Diplomatic posts
Preceded by Pedro Lopes Borio	Brazilian Ambassador to Canada; 2023–present	Incumbent
