= Embassy of Brazil, Islamabad =

Embassy of Brazil in Islamabad
- Location: Islamabad, Pakistan
- Address: House No. 1, Street No. 72, Sector F-8/3
- Coordinates: 33°43′15.9″N 73°02′36.9″E
- Ambassador: Olyntho Vieira
- Website: islamabade.itamaraty.gov.br

The Embassy of Brazil in Islamabad (Note: Portuguese: Embaixada do Brasil em Islamabade; Urdu: برازیلی سفارتخانہ، اسلام آباد) is the diplomatic mission of Brazil in Pakistan. The current Brazilian ambassador to Pakistan is Olyntho Vieira.

== Location ==
The embassy is located at House No. 1 on Street No. 72 in sector F-8/3 of Islamabad. In addition to the ambassador's office, the embassy includes the consular, commercial, cultural and educational, and cooperation sections.

== History ==
The Brazilian embassy in Pakistan was established in 1952, shortly after the two countries established diplomatic relations in 1948. Brazil was the first Latin American country to open a diplomatic mission in Pakistan. The embassy was formerly located at 6 Victoria Road, Karachi, during the 1950s, before the capital was shifted to Islamabad in the 1960s. It is concurrently accredited to Afghanistan and Tajikistan.

== Activities ==
The embassy plays an important role in the promotion of Brazilian culture in Pakistan, and the bilateral relations between the two countries. Various consular services are provided. The Brazilian ambassador also serves as the honorary president of the Pakistan-Brazil Friendship Association (PBFA), established in 2011. The embassy arranges numerous cultural events, including Independence Day celebrations, the Brazilian Film Festival, arts and photographic exhibitions, food exhibitions, musical events, documentary screenings, and book launches. It also provides free language classes in Brazilian Portuguese. Over 120 students have graduated from the course.

== See also ==
- Brazil–Pakistan relations
- List of diplomatic missions of Brazil
- List of diplomatic missions in Pakistan
