= Maria Edileuza Fontenele Reis =

Brazilian ambassador

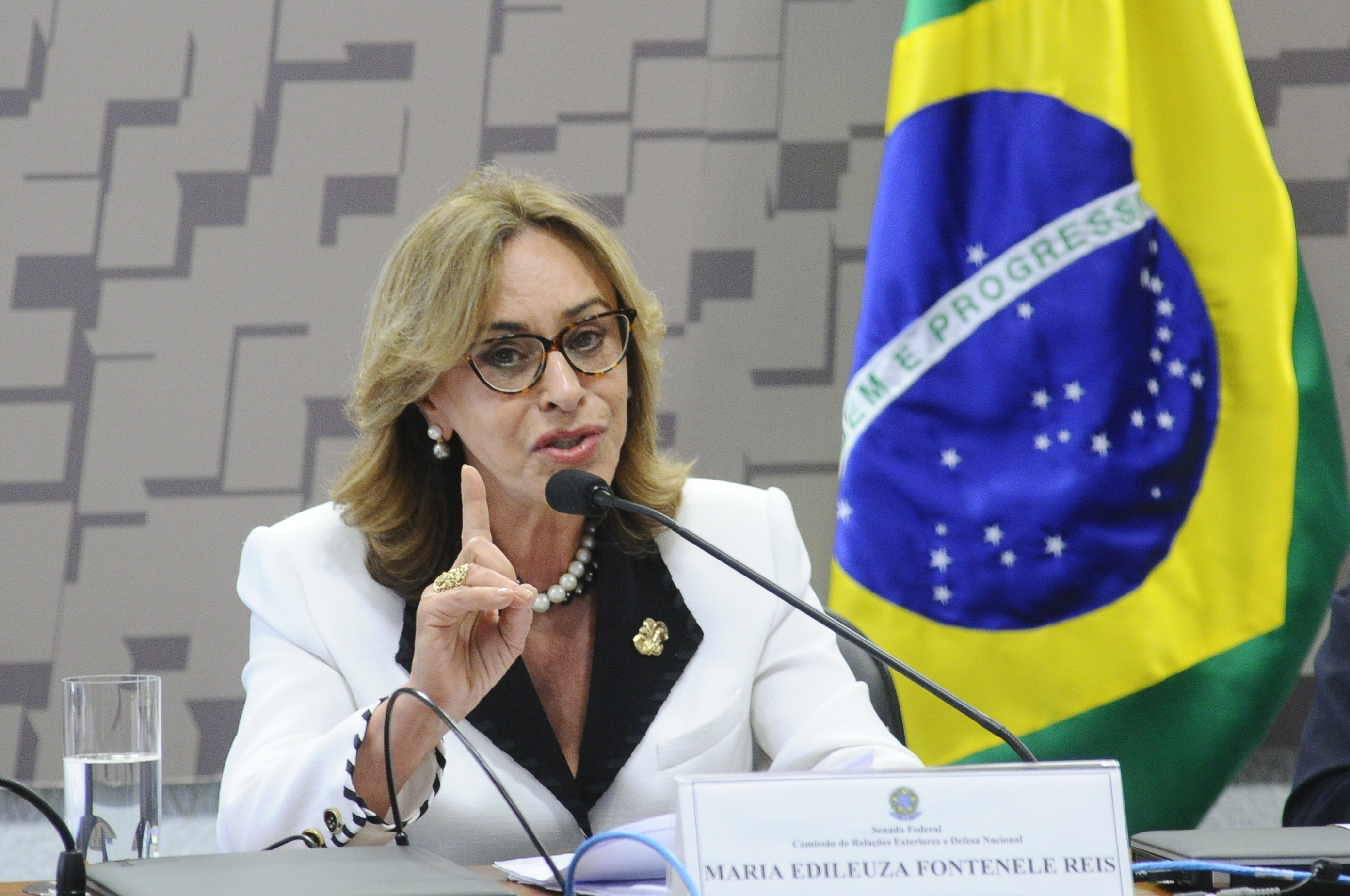
Commission of External Relations and Defense of Brazil

Maria Edileuza Fontenele Reis is the Ambassador of Brazil to the Kingdom of Sweden and to the Republic of Latvia, since February 2024, after serving as Ambassador to Bulgaria and North Macedonia from 2020 to 2023. Before that, she was the Permanent Delegate of Brazil to UNESCO (2017-2019).

== Education & Life ==
Fontenele Reis concluded her undergraduate studies in Social Communication in Brasília in 1975 and in French Culture and Civilization in Paris, in 1976. Among her other academic titles, are the High Studies Course of the Brazilian Diplomatic Academy (PhD level thesis on Brazil-Japan relations, published in Portuguese, Japanese and English); Master's degree in International Relations at the Centro Studi Diplomatici e Strategici in Rome (Italy 2002); and PhD in International Relations and Diplomacy at the École des Hautes Études en Relations Internationales (Paris, 2016). Fontenele Reis is married to retired Ambassador and writer Fernando Guimarães Reis and has two children, Maria Lydia Fontenele Reis and Pedro Felipe Fontenele Reis.

== Career ==
Fontenele Reis joined the Brazilian Ministry of Foreign Affairs in 1978, and was promoted to the rank of First Class Minister (Ambassador) in 2006, after serving in Paris (Consul-General 2015-2017), Luanda (Ambassador, 2014), Rome, Tokyo, Dominican Republic, Argentina and temporary missions in New York, Jamaica and Barbados, and in several other countries. Fontenele Reis occupied positions in different areas of the Brazilian Ministry of Foreign Affairs, among which: Undersecretary for Asian Affairs and Multiregional Mechanisms (2010-2013), Brazilian Sherpa to BRICS (2010-2013); High Level Representative of Brazil to the IBSA Forum (2010-2014); Brazilian High Level Officer for the Forum East Asia-Latin America Cooperation (FEALAC); Regional Coordinator for the South America-Africa Forum (ASA) and the South America-Arab Countries Forum (ASPA)) from 2010 to 2013; Director-General of the Department of European Affairs (2006-2010); Coordinator of Modernization (2005); Assistant of the Undersecretary of Policy Planning (1991-1994). Fontenele Reis also participated as speaker in several academic conferences, seminars and workshops on issues related to Brazilian Foreign Policy and has several articles published about Brazil-China relations, BRICS, IBSA, and Brazil-European Union Strategic Partnership, among other issues.

From 2017 to 2019, she was Permanent Delegate of Brazil to UNESCO. Since 2019, she is the Ambassador of Brazil to Bulgaria and North Macedonia.
