= Antonio Patriota =

Brazilian diplomat (born 1954)

His Excellency Antonio Patriota
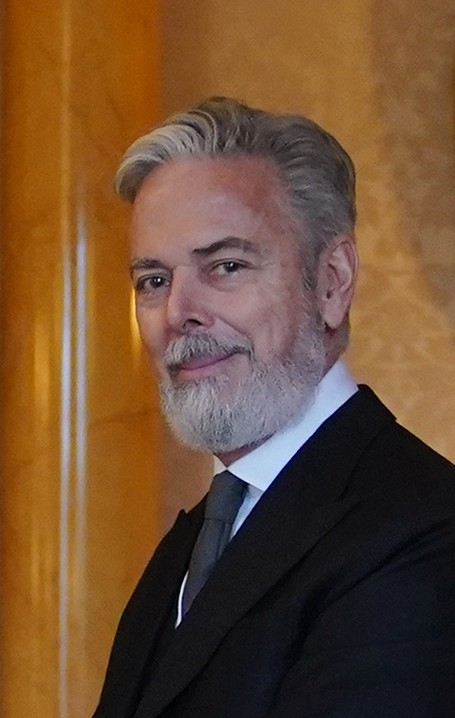

Brazilian ambassador to the United Kingdom
- Incumbent
- Assumed office 15 September 2023
- President: Luiz Inácio Lula da Silva
- Preceded by: Frederico Arruda

Brazilian ambassador to Egypt
- In office 4 July 2019 – 14 June 2023
- President: Jair Bolsonaro
- Preceded by: Ruy de Azevedo Amaral
- Succeeded by: Paulino de Carvalho Neto

Permanent Representative of Brazil in the United Nations
- In office 27 August 2013 – 11 November 2016
- President: Dilma Rousseff
- Preceded by: Luiz Alberto Figueiredo
- Succeeded by: Mauro Vieira

Minister of Foreign Affairs
- In office 1 January 2011 – 26 August 2013
- President: Dilma Rousseff
- Preceded by: Celso Amorim
- Succeeded by: Luiz Alberto Figueiredo

Brazilian Ambassador to the United States
- In office 21 December 2006 – 19 October 2009
- President: Luiz Inácio Lula da Silva
- Preceded by: Roberto Abdenur
- Succeeded by: Mauro Vieira

Personal details
- Born: Antonio de Aguiar Patriota; 27 April 1954 (age 72) Rio de Janeiro, Brazil
- Spouse: Tania Cooper (m. 1993)
- Education: University of Geneva (PhB)
- Profession: Diplomat
- Awards: Order of Military Merit (Commander - Comendador)

Antonio de Aguiar Patriota (born April 27, 1954) is a Brazilian diplomat who is the current ambassador of Brazil to the United Kingdom and former minister of foreign affairs. He took office as foreign minister on January 1, 2011, and remained in office until August 26, 2013. Ambassador Patriota is a member of the “Leaders for Peace” initiative under the chairmanship of former French prime minister Jean-Pierre Raffarin.

A graduate in philosophy from the University of Geneva and later international relations by the Rio Branco Institute, Patriota has taken prominent positions within the foreign service such as Brazil's ambassador to the United States between 2007 and 2009, deputy secretary general for political affairs of the Ministry of External Relations, cabinet chief of Foreign Minister Chancellor Celso Amorim and secretary general of the Ministry of External Relations. He was replaced as minister of external relations by Luiz Figueiredo. This replacement was caused by Patriota's deemed responsibility in the operation that transported Bolivian senator Roger Pinto Molina from the Brazilian embassy in La Paz to the Brazilian border. Senator Molina had sought refuge in the Brazilian embassy for 15 months.

== History ==
=== Positions held within the foreign service ===
- 1979-1982 Diplomat at the United Nations office in Brasília
- 1990-1992 Diplomat at the Foreign Policy Secretariat of the Ministry of External Relations
- 1992-1994 Diplomatic Adviser to the Presidency
- 1994-1999 Diplomatic Adviser to the Permanent Mission of Brazil to the United Nations in New York, USA
- 1999-2003 Minister at the Permanent Mission of Brazil to the United Nations in Geneva, Switzerland
- 2003-2004 Secretary of Diplomatic Planning of the Ministry of External Relations
- 2004-2005 Cabinet Chief of the Minister of External Relations
- 2005-2007 Under Secretary-General for Political Affairs of the Ministry of External Relations
- 2007-2009 Ambassador of Brazil to the United States in Washington, D.C.
- 2009-2010 Secretary General of Foreign Affairs of Brazil
- 2011-2013 Minister of Foreign Affairs of Brazil
- 2013-2016 Ambassador of Brazil to the Permanent Mission of Brazil to the United Nations in New York, USA
- 2016-2019 Ambassador of Brazil to Italy in Rome
- 2019-2023 Ambassador of Brazil to Egypt in Cairo
- 2023- Ambassador of Brazil to the United Kingdom

=== Biography ===
Antonio de Aguiar Patriota was born in Rio de Janeiro on April 27, 1954. He was Deputy Foreign Minister from October 2009 to December 2010; Ambassador of Brazil to the United States from 2007 to 2009; Under Secretary General for Political Affairs at the Foreign Ministry from 2005 to 2007; Chief of Staff to the Foreign Minister, in 2004; and Secretary for Diplomatic Planning at the Foreign Ministry, in 2003.

Overseas, he also served at Brazil's Permanent Mission to the International Organizations in Geneva (1999-2003), having acted for two years as Deputy Permanent Representative to the World Trade Organization; at Brazil's Permanent Mission to the United Nations in New York (1994-1999), where he was a member of the Brazilian Delegation to the U.N. Security Council; at the Embassies of Brazil in Caracas (1988-1990) and Beijing (1987-1988); and at Brazil's Permanent Mission in Geneva (1983-1987).

From 1992 to 1994, he was Deputy Diplomatic Advisor to then President Itamar Franco.

He graduated from Brazil's Diplomatic Academy, the Rio Branco Institute, in 1979. His thesis for the Advanced Studies Course at the Rio Branco Institute, titled “The Security Council After the Gulf War: articulating a new paradigm for collective security”, was published in 1988.

Minister Antonio Patriota is married to Tania Cooper Patriota, who was the Deputy Special Representative of the United Nations Secretary General for Colombia. They have two sons, Miguel and Thomas.

Diplomatic posts
Preceded by Roberto Abdenur	Brazilian Ambassador to the United States; 2006–2009	Succeeded by Mauro Vieira
Preceded by Luiz Alberto Figueiredo	Permanent Representative of Brazil in the United Nations; 2013–2016	Succeeded by Mauro Vieira
Preceded by Ruy de Azevedo Amaral	Brazilian ambassador to Egypt; 2019–2023	Succeeded by Paulino de Carvalho Neto
Preceded by Frederico Arruda	Brazilian ambassador to the United Kingdom; 2023–present	Incumbent
Political offices
Preceded by Celso Amorim	Minister of Foreign Affairs; 2011–2013	Succeeded by Luiz Alberto Figueiredo
