= Brazil–Pakistan relations =

- Pakistan: Brazil

Brazil–Pakistan relations are the bilateral relations between Brazil and Pakistan. Brazil maintains an embassy in Islamabad and Pakistan maintains an embassy in Brasília. Bilateral trade agreements between Pakistan and Brazil is in operation since 1982. Brazil is interested to improve trade volume with Pakistan. Pakistan's current Commercial Counsellor to Brazil is Dr Muhammad Babar Chohan.

In 2009, Brazil approved the sale of 100 MAR-1 anti-radiation missiles to Pakistan despite India's pressure on Brazil not to do so.

Brazil's Defense Minister Nelson Jobim called these missiles "very effective ways to monitor" areas flown by war planes, and said the deal with Pakistan was worth €85 million (US$167.6 million). He dismissed protests by India. "Brazil negotiates with Pakistan, not with terrorists," Mr Jobim said. "To cancel this deal would be to attribute terrorist activities to the Pakistani Government."

At the United Nations, India found itself in the dock at a meeting of the Intergovernmental Negotiations on Security Council reform when Pakistan and other delegates demanded some rationale for its bid. Brazil, Germany and Japan also supported Pakistan's stance for permanent membership of the fifteen members body.

Brazil supports the development of Pakistan's agriculture sector. Brazil having advanced agriculture technologies is helping Pakistan to develop its agriculture sector.

Pakistani students that are finishing their college can apply for an opportunity of having their University studies done in Brazil, with tuition costs covered by the Brazilian Government, through the Program for Exchange Students – Undergraduate (PEC-G). This Program has been in place since 2012.

== See also ==
- Foreign relations of Pakistan
- Foreign relations of Brazil
