= Rio Branco Institute =

University in Brasília, Brazil

Coordinates: 15°48′19″S 47°52′7″W

- Instituto Rio Branco
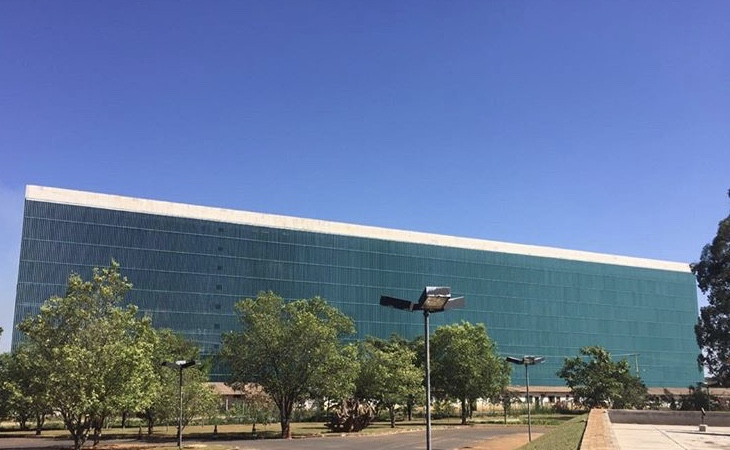
- Type: Brazilian Diplomatic Academy
- Established: April 18, 1945
- Director: Amb. Glivânia Maria de Oliveira
- Location: Brasília, Brazil
- Website: www.institutoriobranco.itamaraty.gov.br

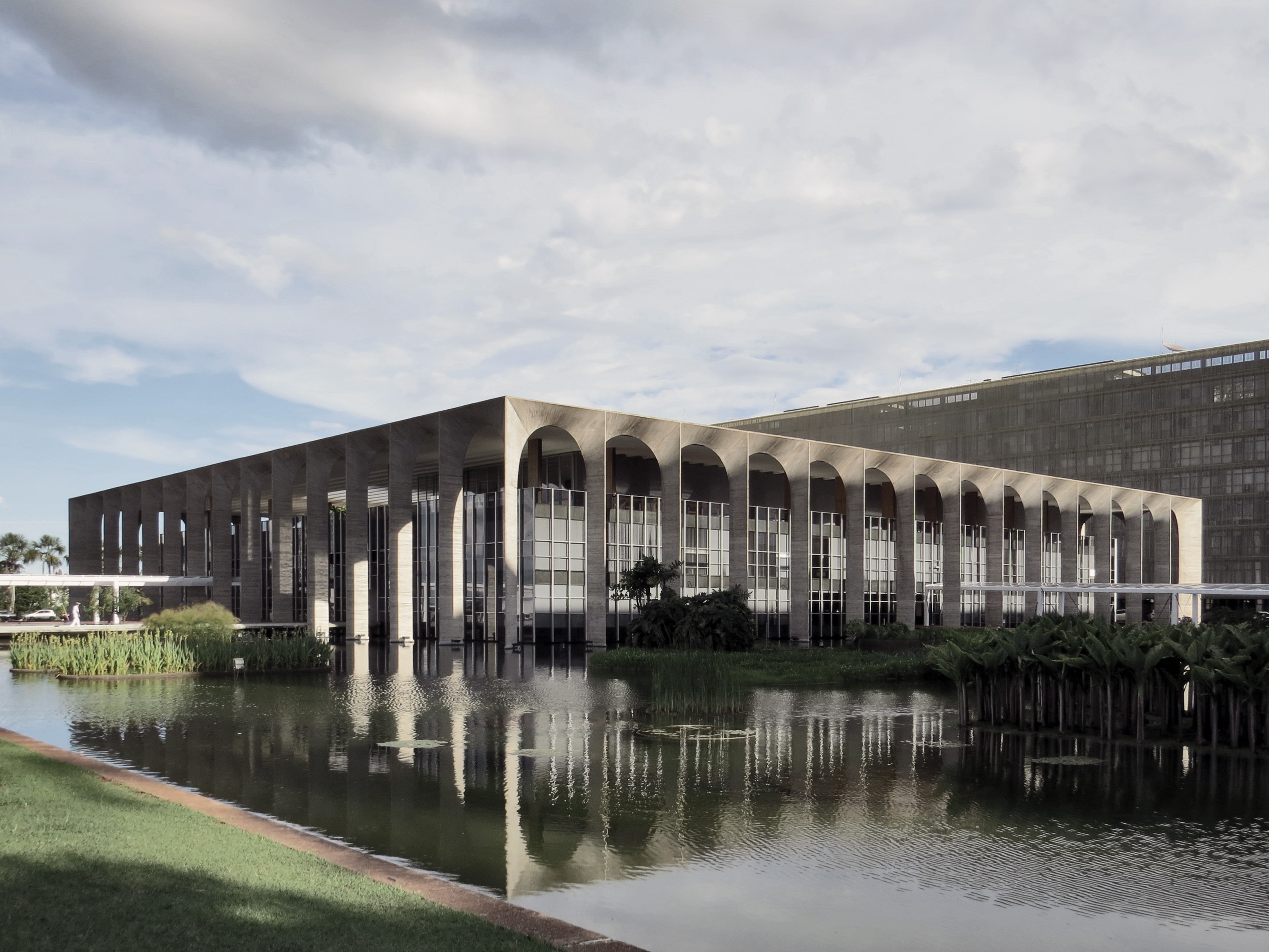
Itamaraty Palace, the Ministry of External Relations of Brazil, where all Brazilian diplomats work, after graduating from the Rio Branco Institute, before going to embassies and consulates.

The Rio Branco Institute (Portuguese: Instituto Rio Branco; Abbreviation: IRBr) is Brazil's diplomatic graduate school, internationally recognized as one of the best diplomatic academies in the world. It is the oldest government school in the country and the third oldest diplomatic training institution on the planet, located in Brasília. The institute was created on April 18, 1945, as part of the centennial celebration of the birth of the Baron of Rio Branco, the greatest and most important diplomat in the history of Brazil. The IRBr is run by the Ministry of External Relations of Brazil.

Graduation from the IRBr is the only possible entrance point into the diplomatic career in Brazil.

== Admission ==
=== Requirements ===
The Ministry of External Relations established the following prerequisites for admission:

- Possess Brazilian citizenship by birth;
- Be over 18 years old;
- Possess an undergraduate degree recognized by the Ministry of Education of Brazil;
- Be up-to-date with military and electoral obligations;
- Possess a clean criminal record.

=== Entry ===
Admission to IRBr is achieved through a three-phase entrance examination:

- First phase: pre-selection exam on Brazilian History, World History, Law, Economics, International Politics, Geography, Portuguese and English;
- Second phase: written exams on Portuguese, English, Brazilian History, Law, Economics, International Politics, Geography, and either Spanish or French.

The exam at the Rio Branco Institute is considered the most difficult public exam in Brazil and one of the most complex in the world. After being approved, the candidate must present the documents required by law and enroll in the Graduation and Improvement Program. Soon after, the candidate begins to study diplomacy at the Institute and becomes a career diplomat.

== Courses ==
Students at the Rio Branco Institute, in 1947.

The Rio Branco Institute offers a mandatory and intense career program and three advancement courses.

=== Graduate Course ===
The IRBr's Graduation and Improvement Program, Diplomat Training Course (CFD), is a one-year-and-a-half program of studies, encompassing studies in fields such as History, Economics, Politics, Law, Foreign Policy, English, French, Spanish, Chinese, Russian and Arabic. After successful completion of the course, students are confirmed in the Foreign Service as Third-Secretaries.

=== Postgraduate Course ===
The Diplomat Improvement Course (CAD) is maintained by the Rio Branco Institute as an integral part of the diplomat career training and qualification system, with the aim of deepening and updating the knowledge necessary for the performance of the functions performed by Seconds and First Secretaries. Possession of the CAD diploma is a requirement for the functional progression of its holder to First Secretary.

=== Higher Studies Course (PhD) ===
The Higher Studies Course (CAE) consists of the preparation of an analytical and propositional thesis, with functional relevance and utility for Brazilian diplomacy or that represents a contribution to Brazilian historiography or diplomatic thought. The thesis is evaluated by an examining board composed of first-class ministers and subsidized by opinions prepared by two rapporteurs, one internal and the other external to the institution. The examining board decides if the work is able to pass to the defense phase, when its authors are summoned to the argument. The Higher Studies Course is mandatory for a Brazilian diplomat to become an ambassador.

== Career ==
In Brazil, the diplomatic career is very hierarchical and after years of work based on meritocracy and completion of the Institute's courses, the diplomat moves up the career ladder. The six positions of Brazilian diplomacy are:

- Third-Secretary (initial career position, where the public servant will take the Diplomat Training Course);
- Second-Secretary (position where the civil servant will take the Diplomat Improvement Course);
- First Secretary;
- Minister-Counselor (position where the diplomat will take the Higher Studies Course);
- Second Class Minister;
- First Class Minister or Ambassador (highest position in the diplomatic career).

Brazilian diplomacy is internationally recognized as one of the most respected and prepared in the world.
