= Fátima Bezerra =

Brazilian politician

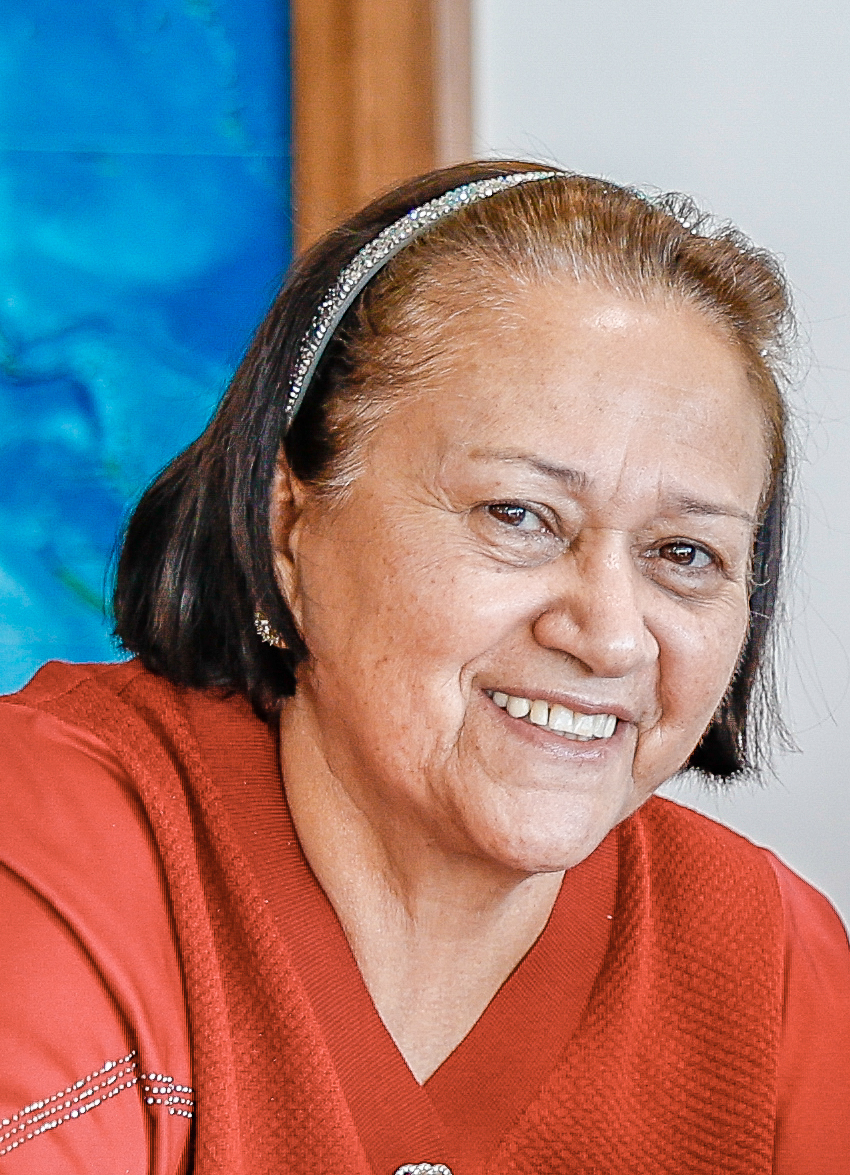
- Bezerra in 2023

Governor of Rio Grande do Norte
- Incumbent
- Assumed office 1 January 2019
- Vice Governor: Antenor Roberto (2019–2023); Walter Alves (2023–present)
- Preceded by: Robinson Faria

Senator for Rio Grande do Norte
- In office 1 February 2015 – 31 December 2018
- Preceded by: Ivonete Dantas
- Succeeded by: Jean Paul Prates

Federal Deputy for Rio Grande do Norte
- In office 1 February 2003 – 1 February 2015

State Deputy of Rio Grande do Norte
- In office 1 February 1995 – 1 February 2003

Personal details
- Born: 19 May 1955 (age 71) Nova Palmeira, Paraíba, Brazil
- Party: PT (since 1981)
- Education: Federal University of Rio Grande do Norte
- Profession: Teacher

Maria de Fátima Bezerra (born 19 May 1955) is a Brazilian politician who has served as Governor of Rio Grande do Norte since January 2019. Previously, she was a federal deputy representing the state from 1995 to 2015. A member of the Workers' Party, she is one of the first two openly LGBTQ governors in Brazil's history (alongside Eduardo Leite), identifying as a lesbian woman.

== Early life and education ==
Maria de Fátima Bezerra was born on 19 May 1955 in Nova Palmeira, in the state of Paraíba. She moved to Natal, Rio Grande do Norte, as a teenager.

In 1980, she graduated in Pedagogy from the Federal University of Rio Grande do Norte (UFRN), and soon after became a teacher in the public school system in the city of Natal and in the state government.

== Teaching and union activities ==
She also became a union leader, as vice-president (1980–1982) and then president (1982–1985) of the Association of Educational Advisers General Secretary of the Teachers' Association (1985–1987). From 1989 until 1991 she was general secretary, and until 1994 president, of the Education Workers Union. Both union organizations are in the state of Rio Grande do Norte.

== Political career ==
=== State representative ===
A member of the Workers' Party (PT) since 1981, Fátima Bezerra was elected state deputy for Rio Grande do Norte for two terms: in 1994, with 8,347 votes; and in 1998, with 30,697 votes. During the time that she remained in the Legislative Assembly of Rio Grande do Norte (ALRN), she was president of the Human Rights Commission and of the Consumer Protection, Environment and Interior Commission. She also represented the Legislative Power of Rio Grande do Sul in the State Council for the Defense of Human Rights and Citizenship and in the State Council for the Environment. As a parliamentarian, she was delegated to the IV World Conference on Women (Beijing, 1995) and the I and II World Social Forum (Porto Alegre, 2001 and 2002), and participated in the International Meeting in Solidarity with Cuban Women (Havana, 1998). In addition, in 1996, 2000, 2004 and 2008, Fátima Bezerra was a candidate for the municipal government of Natal, losing, respectively, to Wilma de Faria (twice), Carlos Eduardo Alves and Micarla de Sousa, until, in the year of 2012, gave up running for the position and launched the candidacy of Fernando Mineiro (PT), who also lost the election in 2012 and 2016.

=== Federal Deputy ===
In 2002, Fátima Bezerra ran for the post of federal deputy for Rio Grande do Norte and managed to get elected with the best vote in her state, reaching the sum of 161,875 votes. In 2006, she was re-elected with 116,243 votes and, in 2010, with 220,355 votes, the year in which she obtained the fifth best proportional vote in the country, in addition to achieving the largest vote that a deputy has ever received in Rio Grande do Norte. During his first term in the Chamber of Deputies, in August 2003, she voted in favor of the proposal for Pension Reform presented by the Government Luiz Inácio Lula da Silva (2003–2007), approved in two rounds in Congress and sent to the Federal Senate. In December of the same year, the constitutional amendment that changed the country's pension system was promulgated by the then president of the Senate, José Sarney (PMDB). In 2004, Fátima Bezerra served as the head of the Special Commission for the Year of Women, in 2005, she was chosen as chair of the Participatory Legislation Commission and, in March 2006, she became the head of the Permanent Commission for Education, Culture and Sport. Still in this last year, she served as the second vice president of the special commission for the constitutional amendment that created the Fund for Maintenance and Development of Basic Education and Valorization of Education Professionals (FUNDEB), approved by the National Congress in December. Already during her last term in the Federal Chamber, in 2011, Fátima Bezerra held the presidency of the Education Commission, in addition to serving on the Special Commission that discussed Bill 8035/10, referring to the 'National Education Plan' responsible for establishment of guidelines for Brazilian education by 2020.

=== Senator ===
In 2014, she ran for the position of senator for Rio Grande do Norte on the plate that supported Robinson Faria of the PSD for governor. Defeating the former governor Wilma de Faria of the PSB, Fátima Bezerra managed to be elected with the sum of 808,055 votes, representing 54.84% of the valid votes. In October 2017, Bezerra voted against maintaining the mandate of Senator Aécio Neves, showing himself favorable to the decision of the First Panel of the Supreme Federal Court in the process in which he is accused of corruption and obstruction of justice for requesting two million reais from the entrepreneur Joesley Batista. With his election to the state government, his first deputy, Jean-Paul Prates (PT) takes over the mandate.

=== Governorship ===
In the 2018 state elections, Fátima Bezerra ran for the government of Rio Grande do Norte through the coalition Do Lado Certo made up of PT, PC do B and PHS, with deputy attorney Antenor Roberto. In the first round, she was in 1st place by reaching 748,150 votes (46.17% of valid votes), defeating then Governor Robinson Faria (3rd) and ahead of former Mayor of Natal, Carlos Eduardo Alves (2nd ), with whom she disputed the second round. In the second round, she was elected governor of the state with the sum of 1,022,910 (57.60% of valid votes), becoming the holder of the largest vote among all the elected governors in the history of Rio Grande do Norte.

==== Request for annulment ====
Fátima Bezerra and Antenor Roberto were the targets of a lawsuit filed by the Electoral Public Prosecutor's Office (MPE) requesting the annulment or suspension of their ticket, along with the rejection of their accounts, which had already been approved with reservations by the Regional Electoral Court (TRE). The request is based on the fact that resources used to promote female candidates were used in the campaigns of 25 men and in a company contracted by Fátima that was created three days before submitting its first invoice to the governor's campaign.

Fátima's defense stated that suspicions raised by the Electoral Public Prosecutor's Office had already been analyzed by the Electoral Court when the accounts were approved, highlighting that the contracted company was created at the last minute due to tax issues and that the campaign funds for the women were transferred from the PCdoB to the governor.

The request for annulment filed by the Electoral Public Prosecutor's Office was denied in a decision by electoral judge Wlademir Capistrano, who defended the maintenance of the popular will exercised through the ballot box. The prosecutors who prepared the action requested an injunction to annul the electoral diploma of the ticket, without the respective defense being heard.

==== Attacks by opponents during the COVID-19 Pandemic ====
Amid the COVID-19 pandemic, physician Nelson Geraldo Freire Neto, cousin of former Rio Grande do Norte governor Fernando Freire, was ordered to delete four posts on Facebook and Instagram in which he attacked Fátima Bezerra at a rally in support of President Jair Bolsonaro in Brasília. In the posts, Nelson called the governor a drug trafficker and a practitioner of witchcraft, and also claimed that Fátima was practicing voodoo against the then-President of the Republic.

== Elections ==
Year	Election	Party	Office	Coalition	Partners	Party	Results
1994	RN	PT	State Deputy	None			
1996	Natal	PT	Mayor	Popular Front of Natal (PT, PCdoB, and PPS)	George Câmara	PCdoB	
1998	RN	PT	State Deputy	None			
2000	Natal	PT	Mayor	Popular Front of Natal (PT, PDT, PCdoB, PCB, PHS, and PTdoB)	Leonardo Arruda	PDT	
2002	RN	PT	Federal Deputy	None			
2004	Natal	PT	Mayor	Popular Front of Natal (PT, PTdoB, and PCB)	Adelmaro	PT	
2006	RN	PT	Federal Deputy	None			
2008	Natal	PT	Mayor	United for Natal (PSB, PT, PDT, PTN, PHS, PMDB, PRB, PCdoB, and PCB)	Luiz Eduardo Carneiro	MDB	
2010	RN	PT	Federal Deputy	None			
2014	RN	PT	Senator	Led by the People (PSD, PCdoB, PT, PP, PTC, PEN, PRTB, PPL, and PTdoB)	Jean Paul Prates	PT	
2014	RN	PT	Senator	Led by the People (PSD, PCdoB, PT, PP, PTC, PEN, PRTB, PPL, and PTdoB)	Teodorico Bezerra Neto	PT	
2018	RN	PT	Governor	On the Right Side (PT, PCdoB, and PPS)	Antenor Roberto	PCdoB	
2022	RN	PT	Governor	The Best will Begin! (FE Brasil (PT, PCdoB, and PV), MDB, PDT, Republicanos, and PROS)	Walter Alves	MDB	
