= Agnelo Alves =

Brazilian journalist and politician

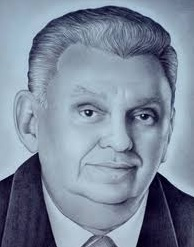

State deputy of Rio Grande do Norte
- In office 1 January 2011 – 21 June 2015

Mayor of Parnamirim
- In office 1 January 2001 – 1 January 2009
- Preceded by: Raimundo Marciano
- Succeeded by: Maurício Marques

Senator for Rio Grande do Norte
- In office 19 July 1999 – 31 December 2000

Mayor of Natal
- In office 8 April 1966 – 28 August 1969
- Preceded by: Tertius Rebelo
- Succeeded by: Ernani Silveira

Personal details
- Born: Agnelo Alves; 16 July 1932 Ceará-Mirim, Rio Grande do Norte, Brazil
- Died: 21 June 2016 (aged 83) São Paulo, Brazil
- Party: MDB (1966–1979); PMDB (1980–2001); PSB (2001–2009); PDT (2009–2015)
- Spouse: Celina Alves
- Children: Carlos Eduardo Alves
- Relatives: Aluízio Alves (brother); Garibaldi Alves (brother); Garibaldi Alves Filho (nephew); Ana Catarina Alves (niece); Henrique Eduardo Alves (nephew)

Agnelo Alves (16 July 1932 – 21 June 2015) was a Brazilian journalist and politician. He was both the mayor of the cities of Natal and Parnamirim at various points. He was also a senator from and state deputy in the state of Rio Grande do Norte. His son is Carlos Eduardo Alves, who would also later become the mayor of Natal.

== Biography ==
Alves, the son of Manoel Alves Filho and Maria Fernandes Alves, was born on 16 July 1932 in the city of Ceará-Mirim. He was afflicted with pulmonary sicknesses in his infancy. In his later youth, he became a part of the newspaper Tribuna do Norte, initially collaborating as a journalist before becoming a professional in the area.

In 1955, he began his public career as the Chief of the Cabinet of Dr. Reginaldo Fernandes at the National Tuberculosis Service in Rio de Janeiro. During his stay in the city, he worked at various periodicals such as Tribuna da Imprensa, Diário Carioca, Jornal do Brasil, and Diário de Pernambuco. On returning to Natal, Agnelo dedicated himself to the electoral campaign of his brother, Aluízio Alves, who would become governor. After Aluízio's electoral victory, Agnelo was invited by president Jânio Quadros to become a member of his press office in Brasília, along with Carlos Castelo Branco and José Aparecido de Oliveira. However, his plans changed when he received an invite by Manoel de Medeiros Brito to become the Chief of the Civil Cabinet of the state of Rio Grande do Norte. In the Aluízio Alves government, Agnelo took on various roles, including as the president of FUNDHAP, where he implemented the pioneering project Cidade da Esperança, meant to create public housing in Brazil.

He also wrote two books: “Crônicas de Outros Tempos e Circunstâncias”, and the second presenting his administrative experience: “Parnamirim e Eu”. Alves was a member of one of the most influential political families in the state of Rio Grande do Norte, including his brothers Aluízio Alves and Garibaldi Alves, his son Carlos Eduardo Alves, and his nephews Henrique Eduardo Alves and Garibaldi Alves Filho.

=== Mayoralty of Natal ===
Alves was elected as mayor of Natal by popular vote in 1965. He governed from 1966 to 1969 as part of the MDB, introducing bold plans for city-wide projects. In 1968, his administration was interrupted by Institutional Act Number Five (AI-5). He was imprisoned and had his political rights taken away, being the subject of 17 investigations, prison time, and interrogations. He invented various tactics to maintain his political influences, including becoming president of the deliberative council of the ABC Futebol Clube and publishing articles on Tribuna do Norte under the pseudonym "Neco", where he worked as a publisher and editor.

Prior to this, his brothers Aluízio and Garibaldi were also imprisoned. One of the most prominent works was the Estádio de Lagoa Nova, which, during the military dictatorship, was renamed the "Castelão" as tribute to former president Humberto de Alencar Castelo Branco. The stadium was renamed again to Machadão in tribute to lawyer and sports writer João Cláudio de Vasconcelos Machado.

=== Banco do Nordeste ===
Towards the end of the dictatorship, Agnelo actively participated in the campaign of Aluízio for his run for governor in 1982. Despite their efforts, they were not successful. Afterwards, Agnelo engaged in the Diretas Já campaign. With the defeat of the Dante de Oliveira Amendment in Congress, Agnelo continued work alongside his brother Aluízio. Tancredo Neves had been elected president, but died shortly before he could take office. Vice-president José Sarney, a close friend of both Aluízio and Agnelo, assumed the presidency. As a result of the friendship, Agnelo was appointed general director of the Banco do Nordeste (BNB), based in Fortaleza.

After accomplishing his goals in the federal government, Agnelo returned to political activities as the proprietor of an FM radio station in Parnamirim, outside of Natal, where he made frequent contacts with old political allies. In 1996, he ran for the mayoralty of the city, but was defeated by Raimundo Marciano by a close margin of 968 votes.

=== Federal Senate ===
During the 1998 elections, Alves was chosen by the PMDB as a subsititute for candidate Fernando Bezerra (PMDB), who was elected. In 1999, Bezerra was invited to become the Minister of National Integration by the Fernando Henrique Cardoso government, and thus resigned from the Senate. Due to this, Alves assumed the vacancy until 2000, when he decided to run again as mayor of Parnamirim. In the Senate, the second substitute, Tasso Rosado, assumed the vacancy subsequently left by Alves.

=== Mayoralty of Parnamirim ===
In the 2000 elections, he defeated the incumbent mayor, Raimundo Maciano (Progressistas), gaining more than 10,000 votes and becoming the mayor of the city of Parnamirim. During his mayoralty, he proposed a set of goals inspired by Juscelino Kubitschek's goals during his presidency. Alves' administration helped to install panels on houses in urban areas and in the further out districts in order to show the public the effects of the monthly municipal budget and have a more transparent government. In 2004, as part of the Brazilian Socialist Party (PSB), he was reelected with more than 70% of the vote against his previous opponent, former mayor Raimundo Marciano.

During his 8 years in office, there were almost a thousand roads paved, 13 news schools built and 12 children's centers. Along with these, 25 basic health facilities were reformed and broadened, and a new maternity hospital was inaugurated, offering 10 neonatal care beds. Alves' administration also began projects to expand water drainage to a number of neighborhoods in Parnamirim. Mortality among children 5 and under fell by 60% during his mayoralty. He had a 92% approval rating by the end of his term, and his vice-mayor, Maurício Marques, ran to succeed him as mayor as part of the PDT. Marques was elected with 35,661 votes (50.94%) against public speaker Gilson Moura of the PV, who received 32,988 votes (47.12%).

=== Legislative Assembly ===
As a member of the PDT, Alves was elected as a state deputy in 2010, being reelected in 2014. He introduced an amendment to the state constitution to establish obligatory budgeting provisions of legislative amendments in the state's budget, which passed in 2014 and became law in 2015. Along with this, in 2011, as president of the Constitution Justice, and Composition Commission, Alves brought attention and honed in on various pending projects to be evaluated. He presented more than 30 requirements and proposed laws, constitutional amendments, and resolutions.

On 21 June 2015, Alves died of cancer in São Paulo, having suffered from esophageal cancer for three years. He had been hospitalized at the Hospital Sírio-Libanês, where he had also been fighting a lung infection.

=== Electoral history ===
Year	Elections	Coalition	Party	Position	Votes	%	Result
1965	Natal Municipal Elections	PSD, PTB	PSD	Mayor	33,302	60.53%	Won
1996	Parnamirim Municipal Elections	PMDB, PL, PRN, and PSD	PMDB	Mayor	14,427	42.63%	Lost
1998	Rio Grande do Norte State Elections	PMDB, PPB, PPS, PSD, PAN, PMN, PRN, PRTB, and PTdoB	PMDB	1st Substitute for Fernando Bezerra	539,197	52.34%	Won
2000	Parnamirim Municipal Elections	PMDB, PSDB, PPB, PPS, PSB, and PSD	PMDB	Mayor	28,574	61.07%	Won
2004	Parnamirim Municipal Elections	PDT, PMDB, PSL, PTN, PSB, PSDB, PTdoB and PCO	PSB	Mayor	43,400	72.86%	Won
2010	Rio Grande do Norte State Elections	PDT, PCdoB and PRP	PDT	State Deputy	30,995	1.96%	Won
2014	Rio Grande do Norte State Elections	PMDB, PSB, PR, DEM, PDT, SD, and PROS	PDT	State Deputy	37,768	2.47%	Won
