= Garibaldi Alves =

Brazilian politician (1923–2022)

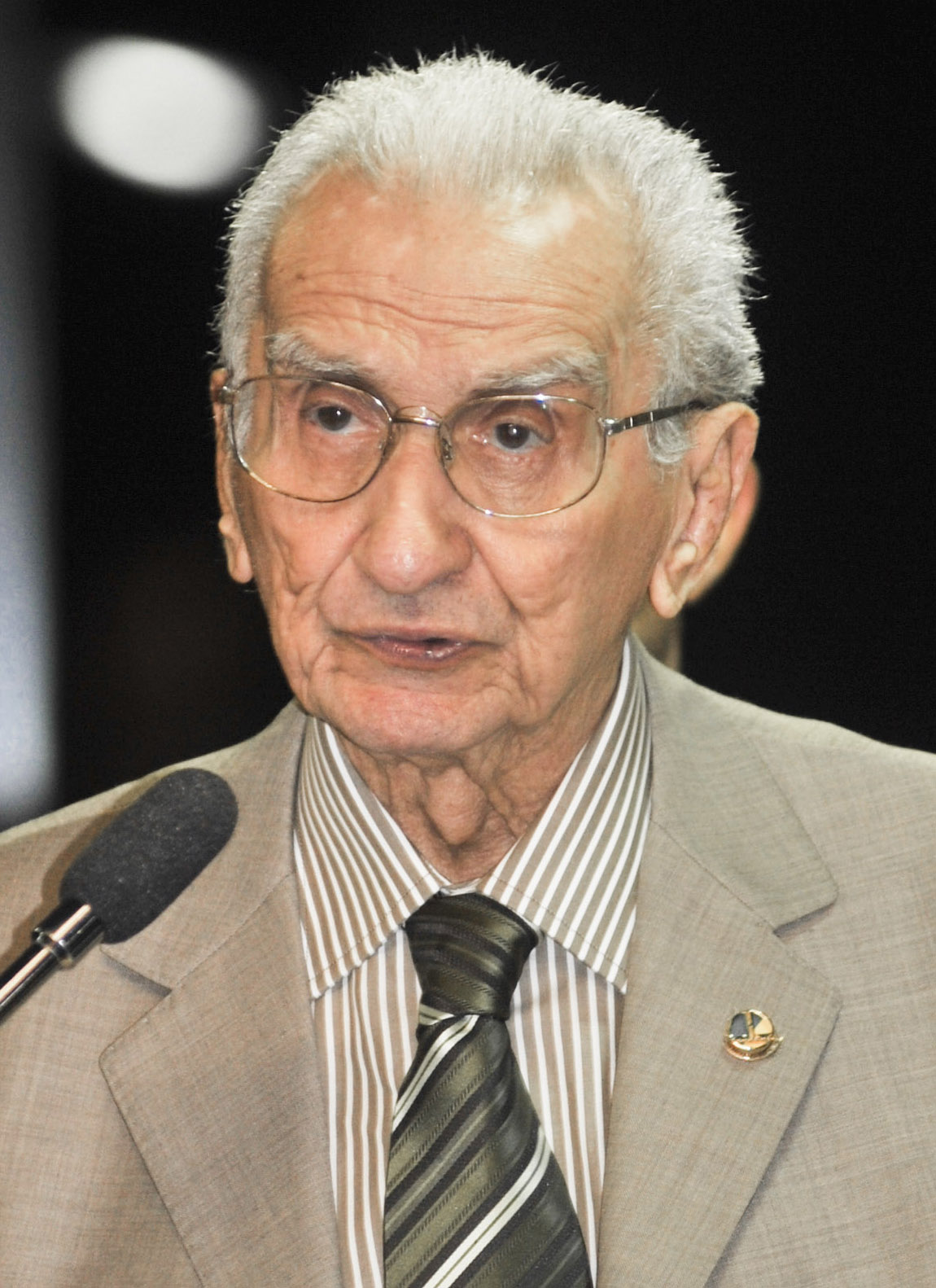

Senator for Rio Grande do Norte
- In office 5 January 2011 – 25 March 2014
- Preceded by: Rosalba Ciarlini
- Succeeded by: Ivonete Dantas

Vice Governor of Rio Grande do Norte
- In office 15 March 1987 – 15 March 1991
- Governor: Geraldo Melo
- Preceded by: Radir de Araújo
- Succeeded by: Vivaldo Costa

Member of the Legislative Assembly of Rio Grande do Norte
- In office 1 February 1957 – 1 February 1969
- Constituency: At-large

Personal details
- Born: 27 May 1923 Angicos, Rio Grande do Norte, Brazil
- Died: 7 April 2022 (aged 98) Natal, Rio Grande do Norte, Brazil
- Party: MDB
- Children: Garibaldi Alves Filho
- Relatives: Agnelo Alves (brother); Aluízio Alves (brother); Carlos Eduardo Alves (nephew); Ana Catarina Alves (niece); Henrique Eduardo Alves (nephew); Walter Alves (great-grandson)

Garibaldi Alves (27 May 1923 – 7 April 2022) was a Brazilian politician. He represented Rio Grande do Norte in the Federal Senate from 2011 to 2014. Previously, he was vice-governor of Rio Grande do Norte from 1987 to 1991. He was a member of the Brazilian Democratic Movement Party.
