= Ana Catarina Alves =

Brazilian businesswoman and politician

Federal deputy of Rio Grande do Norte
- In office 30 October 1997 – 31 January 2003

Councilwoman of Natal
- In office 1989–1993

Personal details
- Born: Ana Catarina Lira Alves; 9 December 1948 (age 77) Natal, Rio Grande do Norte, Brazil
- Party: PTR (1987–1992); PFL (1992–1994); PL (1994–1997); PMDB (1997–present)
- Parent: Aluízio Alves (father)
- Relatives: Henrique Eduardo Alves (brother); Garibaldi Alves (uncle); Garibaldi Alves Filho (cousin); Carlos Eduardo Alves (cousin); Walter Alves (cousin)

Ana Catarina Lira Alves (born 9 December 1948) is a Brazilian businesswoman and politician who was a federal deputy for the state of Rio Grande do Norte from 1997 to 2003. Prior to her election, she was also a councilwoman in the city of Natal from 1989 to 1993.

== Biography ==
Alves is the daughter of former governor of Rio Grande do Norte Aluízio Alves and Ivone Lira Alves. A descendant of one of many prominent political families in Brazil, she made a career for herself as a businesswoman before being elected as a city councilwoman in Natal for the Renovator Labour Party (PTR) in 1988. During her time as councilor, she became a member of the Liberal Front Party (PFL) and ran to become mayor of Natal in 1992, losing in the second round to her twin brother Henrique Eduardo Alves (PMDB) in an election won by Aldo Tinoco (PSB), who was supported by incumbent mayor Wilma de Faria.

She was elected as a substitute for federal deputy in 1994, she assumed office on 30 October 1997 to occupy Iberê Ferreira's seat, who for six months became the state secretary of Work and Social Action of the government of Garibaldi Alves Filho, Ana Catarina's cousin. She later became a long-term member after the death of Carlos Alberto de Sousa. She was elected in her own right in 1998 and left the PL for the PMDB. She was not reelected in 2002. She was later named to the Serviço de Patrimônio da União, an organization linked to the Ministry of Finance.
