= Álvaro Costa Dias =

Brazilian doctor and politician

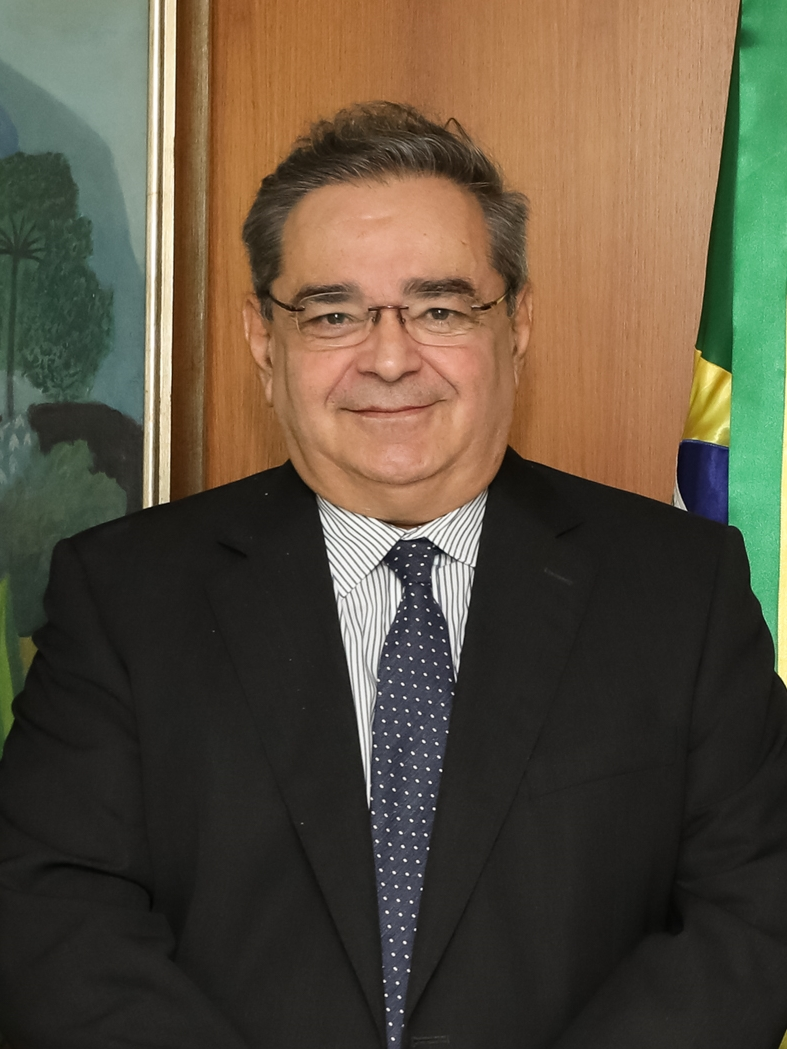

Mayor of Natal
- In office 6 April 2018 – 1 January 2025
- Vice-mayor: none (2017–2020); Aila Cortez (2021–2025)
- Preceded by: Carlos Eduardo Alves
- Succeeded by: Paulinho Freire

Vice-mayor of Natal
- In office 1 January 2017 – 6 April 2018
- Preceded by: Wilma de Faria
- Succeeded by: Aila Cortez (2021)

Federal deputy of Rio Grande do Norte
- In office 1 February 2003 – 31 January 2007

President of the Legislative Assembly of Rio Grande do Norte
- In office 1 February 1997 – 31 January 2003
- Preceded by: Leonardo Câmara
- Succeeded by: Robinson Faria

State deputy of Rio Grande do Norte
- In office 1 February 1991 – 31 January 2003
- In office 1 February 2007 – 31 January 2011
- In office 1 February 2015 – 31 December 2016

Vice-mayor of Caicó
- In office 1989–1990

Personal details
- Born: 4 September 1959 (age 67) Caicó, Rio Grande do Norte, Brazil
- Party: PMDB (1987–2003); PDT (2003–2011); MDB (2011–2020); PSDB (2020–2022); Republicanos (2022–present)
- Spouse: Amanda Diógenes Dias
- Education: Federal University of Rio Grande do Norte

Álvaro Costa Dias (born 4 September 1959), also known as just Álvaro Dias, is a Brazilian doctor and politician, affiliated with the Republicanos. He has been the mayor of the city of Natal since 2018.

He was elected vice-mayor of the city in the 2016 municipal elections, on the ticket led by Carlos Eduardo Alves of the Democratic Labour Party (PDT), but Dias assumed the position on 6 April 2018 after Alves' resignation. Before that, he was the vice-mayor of his hometown of Caicó, in the central region of the state of Rio Grande do Norte, and was a state deputy and federal deputy in and for the state of Rio Grande do Norte.

== Biography ==
Born on 4 September 1959 in Caicó, Dias is the son of Adjuto Dias de Araújo and Cleonice Costa Dias, Dias graduated with a degree in medicine from the Federal University of Rio Grande do Norte (UFRN).

He began his political career at 24 years old, in 1983, when he affiliated with the Brazilian Democratic Movement (PMDB). In 1987, he became the vice-mayor of Caicó, as well as the municipal secretary of health two years after.

In 1990, he became a candidate for state deputy and was elected for his first mandate to the Legislative Assembly of Rio Grande do Norte. He was reelected in 1994 and 1998.

In the 2002 state elections, he ran for federal deputy and gained the second best vote share in his state for the Chamber of Deputies, gaining 138,241 votes. Taking office in the National Congress in 2003, Dias switched parties to the PDT, and also spoke out against the proposal made by the Lula Government for social security reforms. The reforms were eventually approved by the Chamber of Deputies and enacted by then Federal Senate president, José Sarney (PMDB).

In 2004, Dias was elected vice-leader of the PDT and became the head of the special commissions that evaluates constitutional amendments (PECs) about reelections to the Congress, protections of economic rights, youth culture, and about the possibility of military personnel accumulating the payments for teachers, such as technical and science teachers, or for health professionals. He was later the lead member of the permanent councils on Agriculture and Rural Policies, and Education and Culture; and, in April he was chosen to compose the Parliamentary Inquiry Commission that was created to investigate supposed irregularities in the privatization of electricity, identified by the Tribunal de Contas da União (TCU) in the finances of the Brazilian Development Bank (BNDES) for the privatization of Eletropaulo.

In 2006, he became a candidate once again for state deputy for the PDT and was elected again, this time with 40,040 votes. In 2010, he became the vice-gubernatorial candidate in Rio Grande do Norte, on the ticket led by Carlos Eduardo Alves (PDT), but they were defeated by Rosalba Ciarlini. In 2011, Dias disaffiliated with the PDT and returned to the PMDB. He did not stand for any elected office in 2012, opting instead to host a radio program broadcast state-wide.

In 2014, Dias once again became a candidate for state deputy for the Union for Change coalition, made up of PMDB, PSB, PR, DEM, PDT, SD, and PROS. Obtaining 34,638 votes, or 2.09% of the vote, he was elected for the position once more, taking office on 1 February 2015.

During the 2016 Natal municipal elections, Dias became a candidate for vice-mayor of the city, with long-time associate Carlos Eduardo Alves once again at the head of the ticket. They received 225,741 votes, or 63.42% of votes, being elected in the first round. On 6 April 2018, with Alves' resignation to dispute the general elections later that year, Dias became the mayor of Natal.

=== Electoral history ===
Year	Election	Coalition	Party	Position	Votes	%	Result
1988	Caicó Municipal Elections	No Coalition	PMDB	Vice-prefeito			Won
1990	Rio Grande do Norte State Elections	No CoalitionRio Grande do Norte State Elections	No Coalition	PMDB	State deputy		Won
1994	Rio Grande do Norte State Elections	No Coalition	PMDB	State deputy	16,368	2.03	Won
1998	Rio Grande do Norte State Elections	No Coalition	PMDB	State deputy	45,260	4.03	Won
2002	Rio Grande do Norte State Elections	No Coalition	PMDB	Federal deputy	138,241	9.45%	Won
2006	Rio Grande do Norte State Elections	No Coalition	PDT	State deputy	40,040	2.43%	Won
2010	Rio Grande do Norte State Elections	PDT, PCdoB e PRP	PDT	Vice-governor	160,828	10.37%	Lost
2014	Rio Grande do Norte State Elections	PMDB, PSB, PR, DEM, PDT, SD e PROS	PMDB	State deputy	34,638	2.09%	Won
2016	Natal municipal elections	PDT, PMDB, PR, DEM, PTB, PRB, PSC, PROS e PSDC	PMDB	Vice-mayor	225,741	63.42%	Won
2020	Natal municipal elections	PSDB, MDB, DEM, PDT, Republicanos, REDE, Avante, PL e PSD	PSDB	Mayor	194,764	56.58%	Won

== Bibliography ==
- Câmara dos Deputados (2019). "ÁLVARO DIAS - Biografia".
- Eleições 2014 (2014). "Alvaro Dias 15555".
- G1 RN (2015). "Deputados estaduais tomam posse na Assembleia Legislativa do RN".
- G1 RN (2016). "Carlos Eduardo, do PDT, é reeleito prefeito de Natal".
- G1 RN (2018). "Prefeito de Natal anuncia renúncia ao cargo e pré-candidatura ao Governo do RN".
- Meu Congresso Nacional (2014). "Candidatos Eleições 2014".
- Pinheiro, Luciana (2013). "Verbete". Fundação Getúlio Vargas (FGV).
- Tribuna do Norte (2018). "Carlos Eduardo confirma renúncia e candidatura ao Governo do Estado".
- Tribuna do Norte (2022). "Álvaro Dias se filia ao Republicanos e assume comando do partido no RN".
