= Antônio Jácome =

Brazilian politician (born 1962)

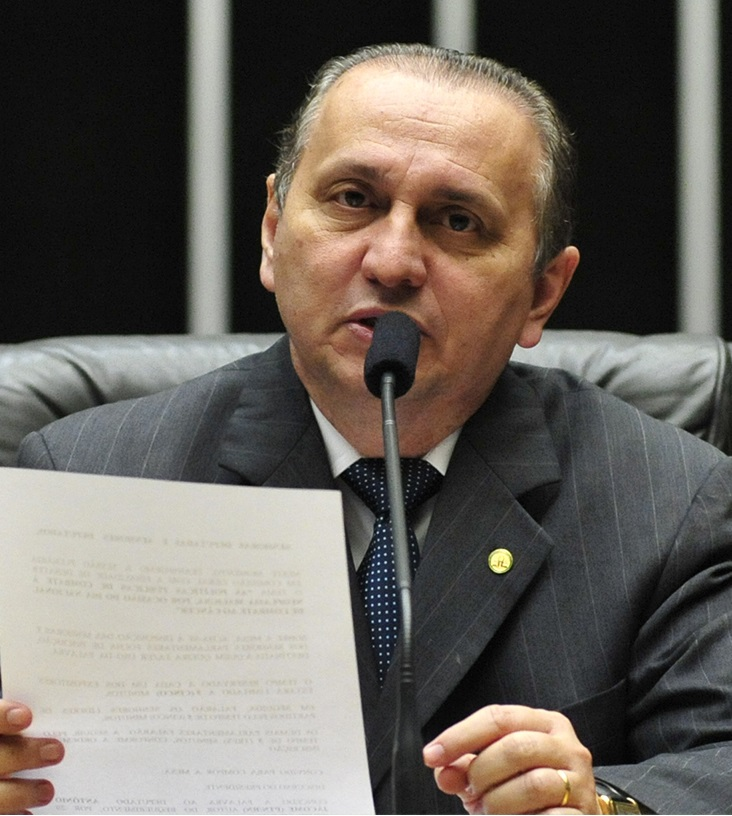
- Jácome in November 2016

Federal Deputy from Rio Grande do Norte
- In office 1 February 2015 – 1 February 2019

Vice–Governor of Rio Grande do Norte
- In office 1 January 2003 – 1 January 2007
- Governor: Wilma de Faria
- Preceded by: Fernando Freire
- Succeeded by: Iberê Ferreira

State Deputy of Rio Grande do Norte
- In office 1 February 1991 – 31 December 1994

Alderman of Natal
- In office 1 January 1989 – 31 January 1991

Personal details
- Born: 26 May 1962 (age 64) Sousa, Paraíba, Brazil
- Party: PODE (2017-present)
- Other political affiliations: PMN (2003–2017); PSB (–2017); PDT; MDB

Antônio Jácome de Lima Júnior (born 26 May 1962), better known as Antônio Jácome, is a Brazilian politician as well as a lawyer, medic, and theologian. Although born in Paraíba, he has spent his political career representing Rio Grande do Norte, having served as federal deputy representative from 2015 to 2019.

== Personal life ==
Jácome is the son of Francisco Xavier de Mesquita and Alda Jácome de Mesquita. Aside from being a politician Jácome has also worked as a lawyer, medic, and theologian. His son Jacó Jácome and nephew Eriko Jácome are both politicians in the state legislature of Rio Grande do Norte. In August 2017 Jácome published a book detailing his time in office.

He is a member and former pastor of the Assembleias de Deus, and became the first evangelical elected from Rio Grande do Norte as federal deputy. In 2011 Jácome was expelled from the role of pastor in the church after it was exposed that Jácome had impregnated a woman in an extra marital affair and later forced her to have an abortion.

== Political career ==
Jácome voted in favor of the impeachment of then-president Dilma Rousseff. Jácome voted in favor of 2015 tax reforms but against the 2017 Brazilian labor reform, and would vote in favor of a corruption investigation into Rousseff's successor Michel Temer.

Jácome contested the 2018 Brazilian general election in his state for the position of senator and garnered 307,399 votes, although it was not enough for him to be elected. In December 2018 Jácome was rumored for the position of Minister of Women, Family and Human Rights in the Bolsonaro government, a move that was controversial both with liberals and conservatives due to his anti-abortion views and his history of forcing a woman to have an abortion. Eventually Damares Alves was nominated instead.
