= List of mayors of Natal, Rio Grande do Norte =

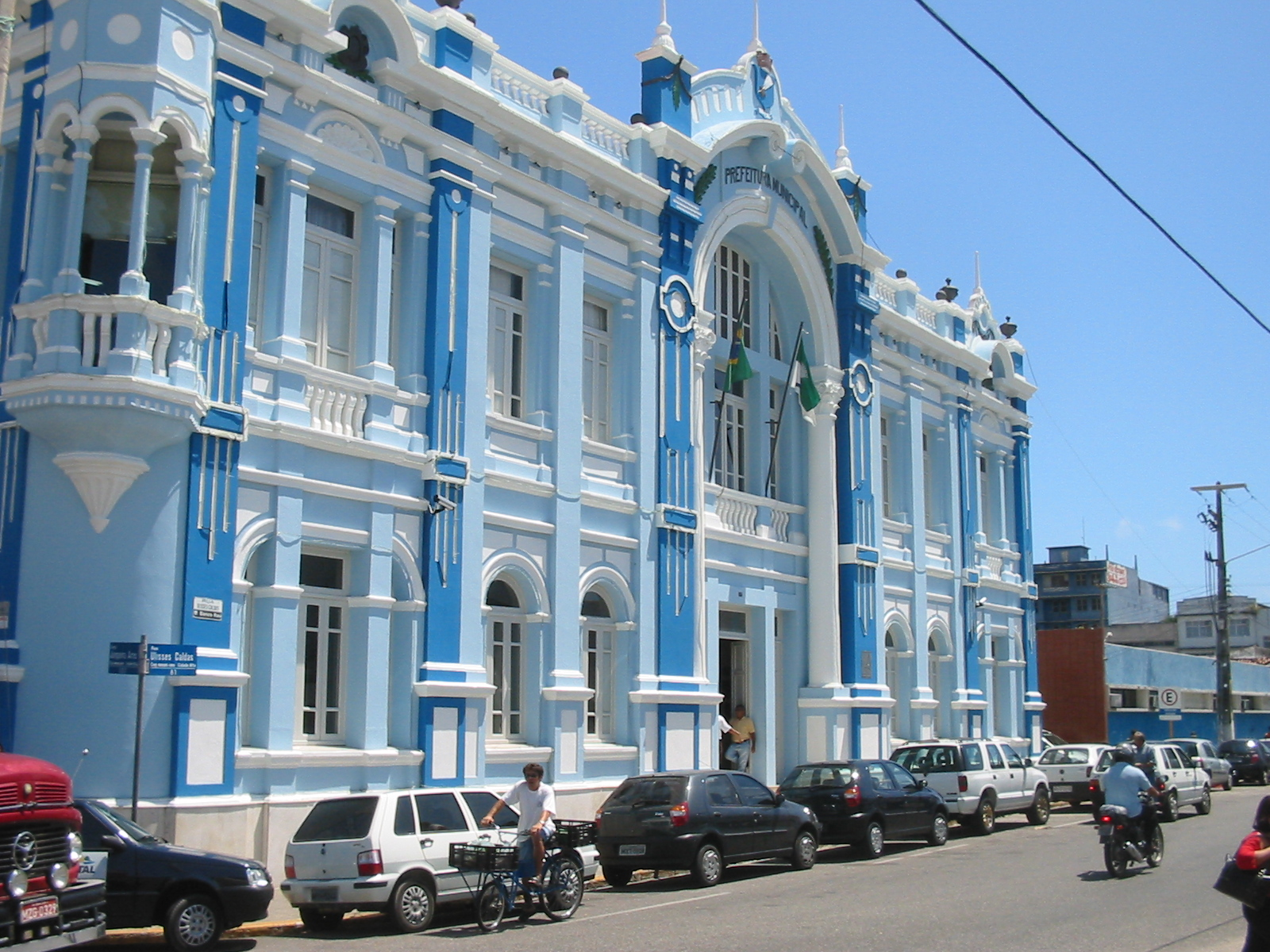
View of city hall Palácio Felipe Camarão, Natal (photo 2004)

The following is a list of mayors of the city of Natal, in the state of Rio Grande do Norte, Brazil.

- Fabrício Gomes Pedroza, 1890-1895
- Olímpio Tavares, 1895-1898
- Joaquim Manoel Teixeira, 1898-1909
- Romualdo Galvão, 1909-1916
- Vicente Inácio Pereira, 1916-1919
- Teodósio Paiva, 1919-1924
- Manoel Dantas, 1924
- Omar O'Grady, 1924-1930
- Pedro Dias Guimarães, 1930-1931
- Gentil Ferreira de Souza, 1931-1932, 1935-1940
- Sandoval Cavalcante, 1932-1933
- Anibal Martins Ferreira, 1933
- José Bilro, 1933-1935
- Joaquim Inácio Filho, 1940-1942
- Mário Eugênio Lira, 1942-1943
- José Augusto Varela, 1943-1946
- Sílvio Pizza Pedroza, 1946-1951
- Claudionor T. de Andrade, 1951
- Olavo João Galvão, 1951-1952
- Crezo Bezerra de Melo, 1952-1954
- Wilson de Oliveira Miranda, 1954-1956
- Djalma Maranhão, 1956-1959, 1961-1964
- José Pinto Freire, 1959-1961
- Tertius Rebelo, 1964-1966
- Agnelo Alves, 1966-1969
- Ernani Alvez da Silveira, 1969-1971
- Ubiratan Pereira Galvão, 1971-1972
- Jorge Ivan Cascudo Rodrigues, 1972-1975
- Vauban Bezerra, 1975-1979
- José Agripino Maia, 1979-1982
- Manoel Pereira dos Santos, 1982-1983
- Marcos César Formiga Ramos, 1983-1986
- Garibaldi Alves Filho, 1986-1989
- Wilma de Faria, 1989-1993, 1997-2002
- Aldo Tinoco, 1993-1997
- Carlos Eduardo Alves, 2002-2009, 2013-2018
- Micarla de Sousa, 2009-2012
- Paulinho Freire, 2012
- Ney Lopes Júnior, 2012-2013
- Álvaro Costa Dias, 2018-2025
- Paulinho Freire, 2025-present

== See also ==
- City Council of Natal (city council)
- Natal history
- Rio Grande do Norte history (state)
- History of Rio Grande do Norte (state)
- List of mayors of largest cities in Brazil (in Portuguese)
- List of mayors of capitals of Brazil (in Portuguese)
