= Ivonete Dantas =

Brazilian politician

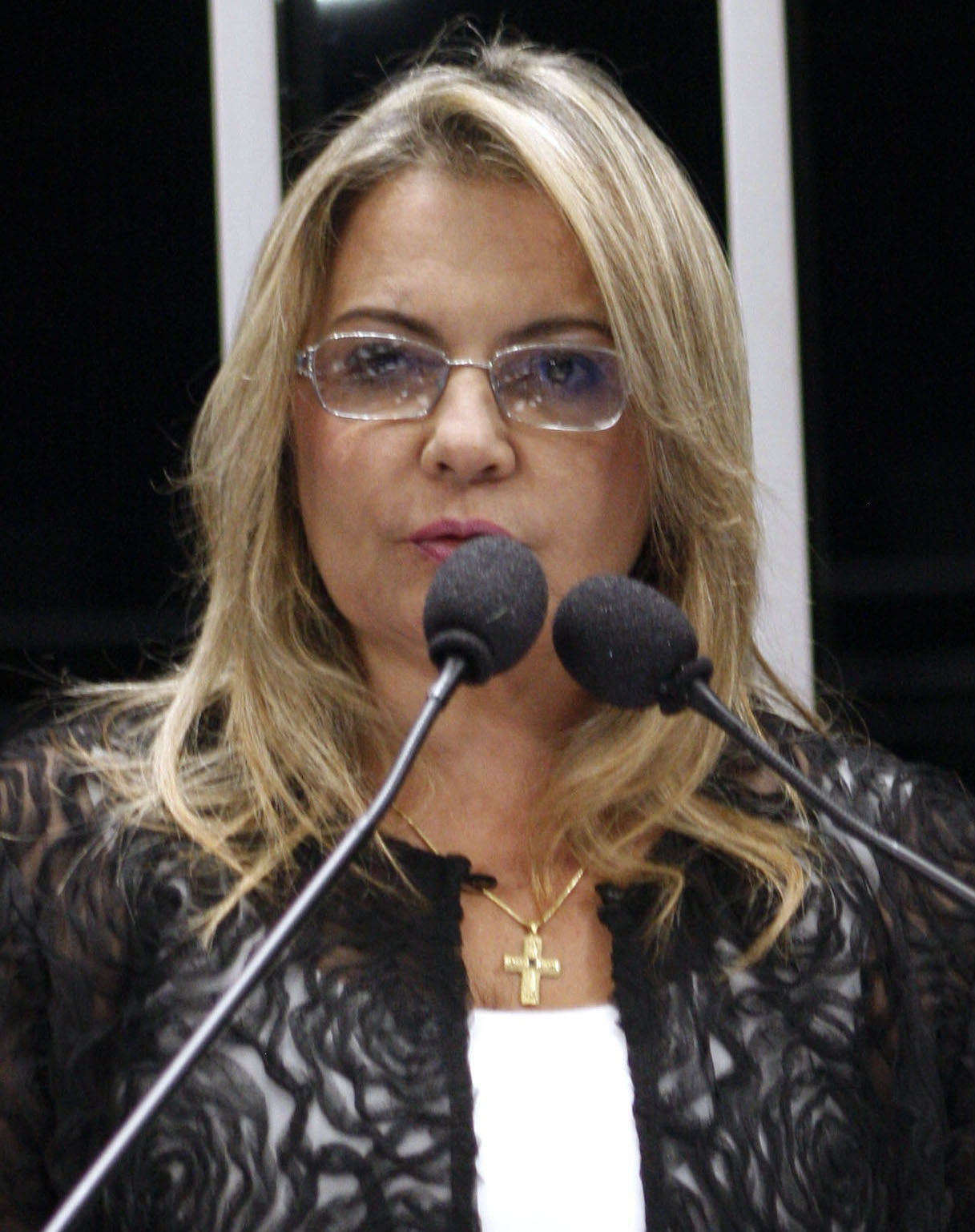
- Dantas in April 2011

Vereador for Caicó
- Incumbent
- Assumed office 1 January 2017

Senator for Rio Grande do Norte
- In office 8 December 2011 – 31 January 2015
- Preceded by: Garibaldi Alves
- Succeeded by: Fátima Bezerra

Secretary of Social Assistance for Caicó
- In office 1 January 2001 – 31 March 2004
- Preceded by: Roberto Germano

State Deputy for Rio Grande do Norte
- In office 1 January 1995 – 31 December 1998

Personal details
- Born: 16 August 1959 (age 67) Caicó, RN, Brazil
- Party: PMDB

Ivonete Dantas Silva (born 16 August 1959) is a Brazilian politician and businesswoman. The current assemblywomen for her hometown of Caicó, she served as the town's secretary of public assistance, as a state representative, and as a member of the federal senate of Brazil from 2011 to 2015.

== Personal life ==
Dantas was born to Tamires Silva and Maria Dantas Silva. She is one of 6 children. She married young and was a mother at 17 and a grandmother at 37. She was a businesswoman prior to entering politics.

== Political career ==
Dantas succeeded Garibaldi Alves after his retirement from the federal senate in 2014. She was elected to the city council in 2016 with 878 votes.
