= List of governors of Rio Grande do Norte =

Order	Portrait	Name	Political Party	Start of Term	End of Term	Notes
1		Pedro de Albuquerque Maranhão	-	November 17, 1889	December 6, 1889	Appointed temporarily head of the provisional government in Rio Grande do Norte .
2		Adolfo Afonso da Silva Gordo	-	December 6, 1889	February 8, 1890	Head of the Provisional Government appointed by Marechal Deodoro da Fonseca.
3		Jerome Américo Raposo Chamber	-	February 8, 1890	March 10, 1890	
4		Joaquim Xavier da Silveira Júnior	-	March 10, 1890	September 19, 1890	
5		Pedro de Albuquerque Maranhão	-	September 19, 1890	November 8, 1890	
6		John Gomes Ribeiro	-	November 8, 1890	December 7, 1890	
7		Castro and Manuel do Nascimento Silva	-	December 7, 1890	March 2, 1891	
8		Amintas Francisco da Costa Barros		March 2, 1891	June 13, 1891	
9		José Inácio Fernandes Barros	-	June 13, 1891	August 6, 1891	
10		Francisco Gurgel de Oliveira	-	August 6, 1891	September 9, 1891	
11		Miguel Joaquim de Almeida Castro	-	September 9, 1891	November 28, 1891	
12		*Francisco de Lima e Silva; *Joaquim Ferreira Chaves; *Manuel do Nascimento Castro and Silva	-	November 28, 1891	February 22, 1892	Governing Board following the resignation of Marshal Diodorus .
13		Jerome Américo Raposo Chamber	-	February 22, 1892	February 28, 1892	Appointed by Marechal Floriano Peixoto .
14		Pedro de Albuquerque Maranhão	-	February 28, 1892	March 25, 1896	First governor elected by the vote .
15		Joaquim Ferreira Chaves	-	March 25, 1896	March 25, 1900	First governor elected by direct vote .
16		Alberto Maranhão	-	March 25, 1900	March 25, 1904	
17		Augusto Tavares Lira	-	March 25, 1904	November 5, 1906	
18		Manuel Moreira Dias	-	November 5, 1906	February 23, 1907	
19		Antonio José de Melo e Sousa	-	February 23, 1907	March 25, 1908	
20		Alberto Maranhão	-	March 25, 1908	December 31, 1913	
21		Joaquim Ferreira Chaves	-	January 1, 1914	December 31, 1920	
22		Antonio José de Melo e Sousa	-	January 1, 1921	1 January 1924	
23		José Augusto Bezerra de Medeiros	-	1 January 1924	December 31, 1927	
24		Juvenal Lamartine de Faria	-	1 January 1928	October 5, 1930	Governor deposed by the Revolution of 1930
25		Luis Tavares Guerreiro; Abelardo Torres da Silva Castro; Julius Perouse Bridges	-	October 6, 1930	October 12, 1930	Military Governing Board
26		Irenaeus Jofili	-	October 12, 1930	January 28, 1931	Interventor appointed by Getulio Vargas
27		Aluisio de Moura Andrade	-	January 29, 1931	July 31, 1931	Interventor appointed by Getulio Vargas
28		Hercolino Cascardo	-	July 31, 1931	June 11, 1932	Interventor appointed by Getulio Vargas
29		Bertino Dutra da Silva	-	June 11, 1932	August 2, 1933	Interventor appointed by Getulio Vargas
30		Mario Leopoldo Pereira da Camera	-	August 2, 1933	October 27, 1935	Interventor appointed by Getulio Vargas
31		Liberato da Cruz Barroso	-	October 27, 1935	October 29, 1935	Interventor appointed by Getulio Vargas
32		Rafael Fernandes Gurjão	AL	October 29, 1935	July 3, 1943	
33		Antonio Fernandes Dantas	-	July 3, 1943	August 15, 1945	Interventor appointed by Getulio Vargas
34		José Avelino Georgino	-	August 15, 1945	November 7, 1945	Interventor appointed by Getulio Vargas
35		Miguel Seabra Fagundes	-	November 7, 1945	February 13, 1946	Interventor appointed by Getulio Vargas
36		Ubaldo Bezerra de Melo	-	February 13, 1946	January 15, 1947	Interventor appointed by Getulio Vargas
37		Orestes da Rocha Lima	-	January 15, 1947	July 31, 1947	He was general and was the last of 11 stakeholders of Rio Grande do Norte
38		José Augusto Varela	PSD	July 31, 1947	January 31, 1951	
39		Jerônimo Dix-Sept Rosado	PSD	January 31, 1951	July 12, 1951	
40		Sylvio Pedrosa	PSD	July 16, 1951	January 31, 1956	
41		Dinarte Mariz	UDN	January 31, 1956	January 31, 1961	
42		Aluízio Alves	PSD	January 31, 1961	January 31, 1966	
43		Walfredo Gurgel	PSD	January 31, 1966	March 15, 1971	
44		Jose Pereira de Araújo Cortez	ARENA	March 15, 1971	March 15, 1975	
45		Tarcisio Maia	ARENA	March 15, 1975	March 15, 1979	
46		Lavoisier Maia	ARENA	March 15, 1979	March 15, 1983	
47		José Agripino Maia	PDS	March 15, 1983	May 15, 1986	
48		Radir Pereira de Araujo	PDS	May 15, 1986	March 15, 1987	
49		Geraldo Melo	PMDB	March 15, 1987	March 15, 1991	
50		José Agripino Maia	PFL	March 15, 1991	April 2, 1994	
51		Vivaldo Costa	PL	April 2, 1994	1 January 1995	
52		Garibaldi Alves Filho	PMDB	1 January 1995	1 January 1999	
-		Garibaldi Alves Filho	PMDB	1 January 1999	April 6, 2002	(reelected)
53		Fernando Freire	PPB	April 6, 2002	January 1, 2003	
54		Wilma de Faria	PSB	January 1, 2003	January 1, 2007	
-		Wilma de Faria	PSB	January 1, 2007	March 31, 2010	(reelected)
55		Iberê Ferreira	PSB	March 31, 2010	January 1, 2011	
56		Rosalba Ciarlini	DEM	January 1, 2011	January 1, 2015	
57		Robinson Faria	PSD	January 1, 2015	January 1, 2019	
58		Fátima Bezerra	PT	January 1, 2019	present	
