= Tertius Rebelo =

Brazilian marine and politician (1915–1976)

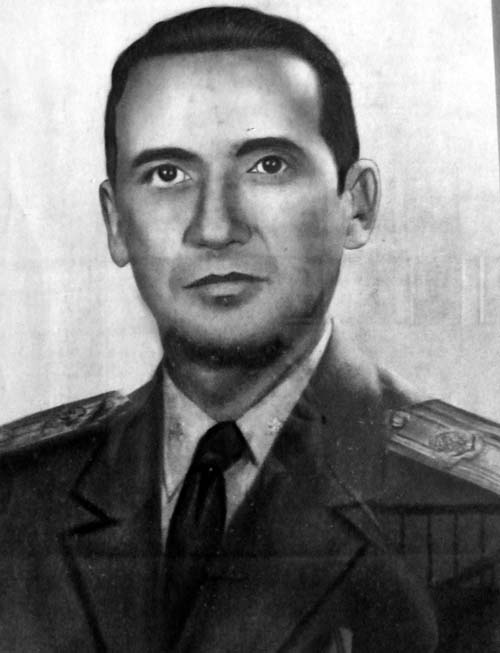

Vice-governor of Rio Grande do Norte
- In office 15 March 1971 – 15 March 1975
- Governor: Cortez Pereira
- Preceded by: Clóvis Motta
- Succeeded by: Genibaldo Barros

Mayor of Natal
- In office 3 April 1964 – 31 January 1966
- Preceded by: Djalma Maranhão
- Succeeded by: Agnelo Alves

Personal details
- Born: Tertius Cesar Pires de Lima Rebelo; 15 September 1915 Parnaíba, Piauí, Brazil
- Died: 27 June 1976 (aged 60) Natal, Rio Grande do Norte, Brazil
- Party: UDN

Tertius Cesar Pires de Lima Rebelo (9 September 1915 — 27 June 1976) was a Brazilian marine and politician who was the mayor of Natal from 1964 to 1966, and later became vice-governor of the state of Rio Grande do Norte from 1971 to 1975.

Rebelo was born on 9 September 1915 in Parnaíba, in the state of Piauí. He was a member of the Brazilian Marines, and was the captain of the Port of Natal during the Second World War. He retired as an admiral.

As a politician, he became mayor after the removal of then mayor Djalma Maranhão. He later became a state deputy and vice-governor of Rio Grande do Norte during the governorship of Cortez Pereira from 1971 to 1975. He died in 1976.

== See also ==
- List of mayors of Natal, Rio Grande do Norte
