= Rampa, Natal =

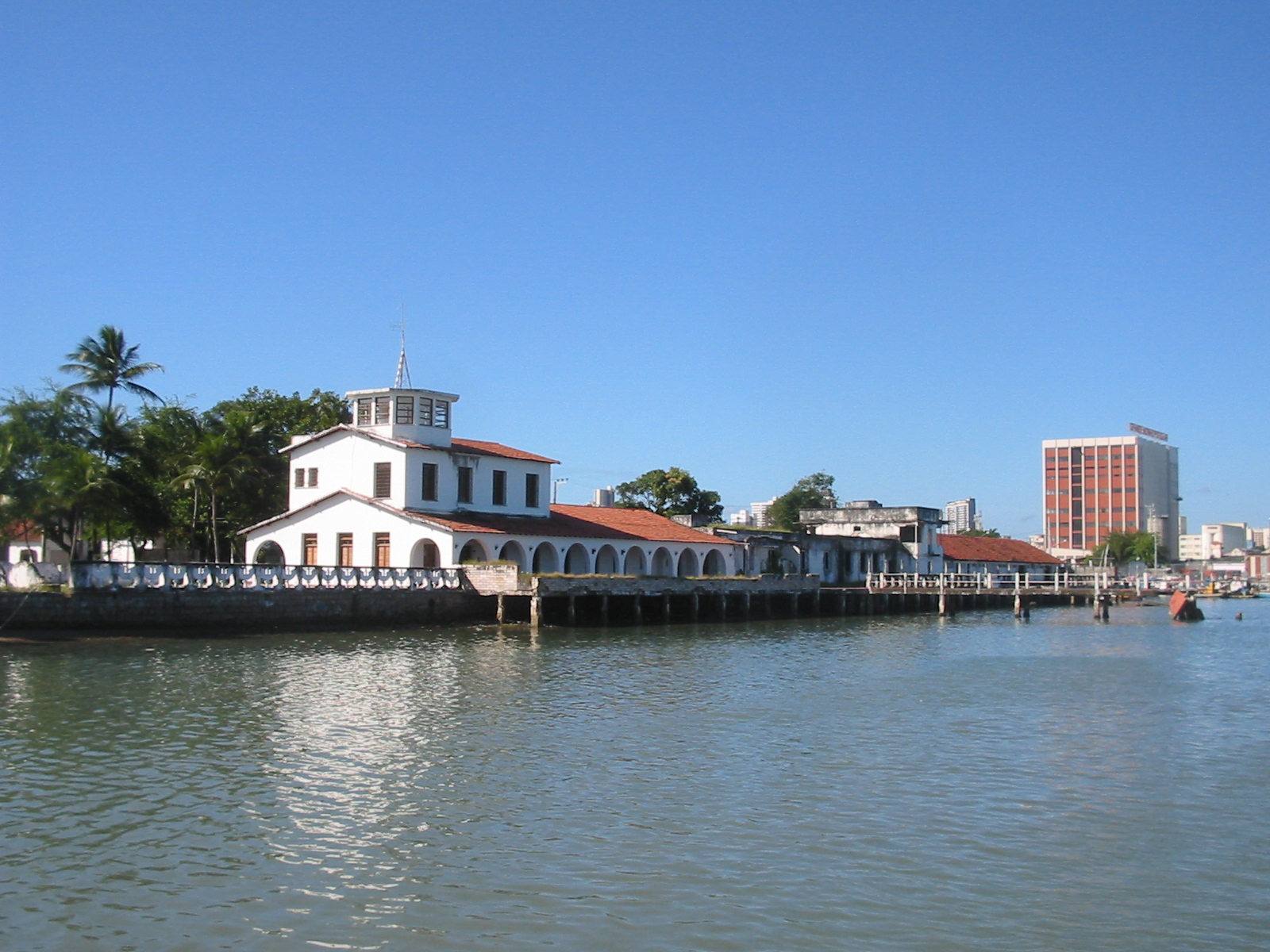
Rampa.

The Rampa (lit. "ramp") located in Natal (Brazil), is a former passenger station and transport connection, used as a seaplane base. Due to its strategic position in Natal, Rampa has been used for missions of war in South America since World War II. Currently, it houses a Museum of Aviation and World War II.
