= Marco Maia =

Brazilian politician (born 1965)

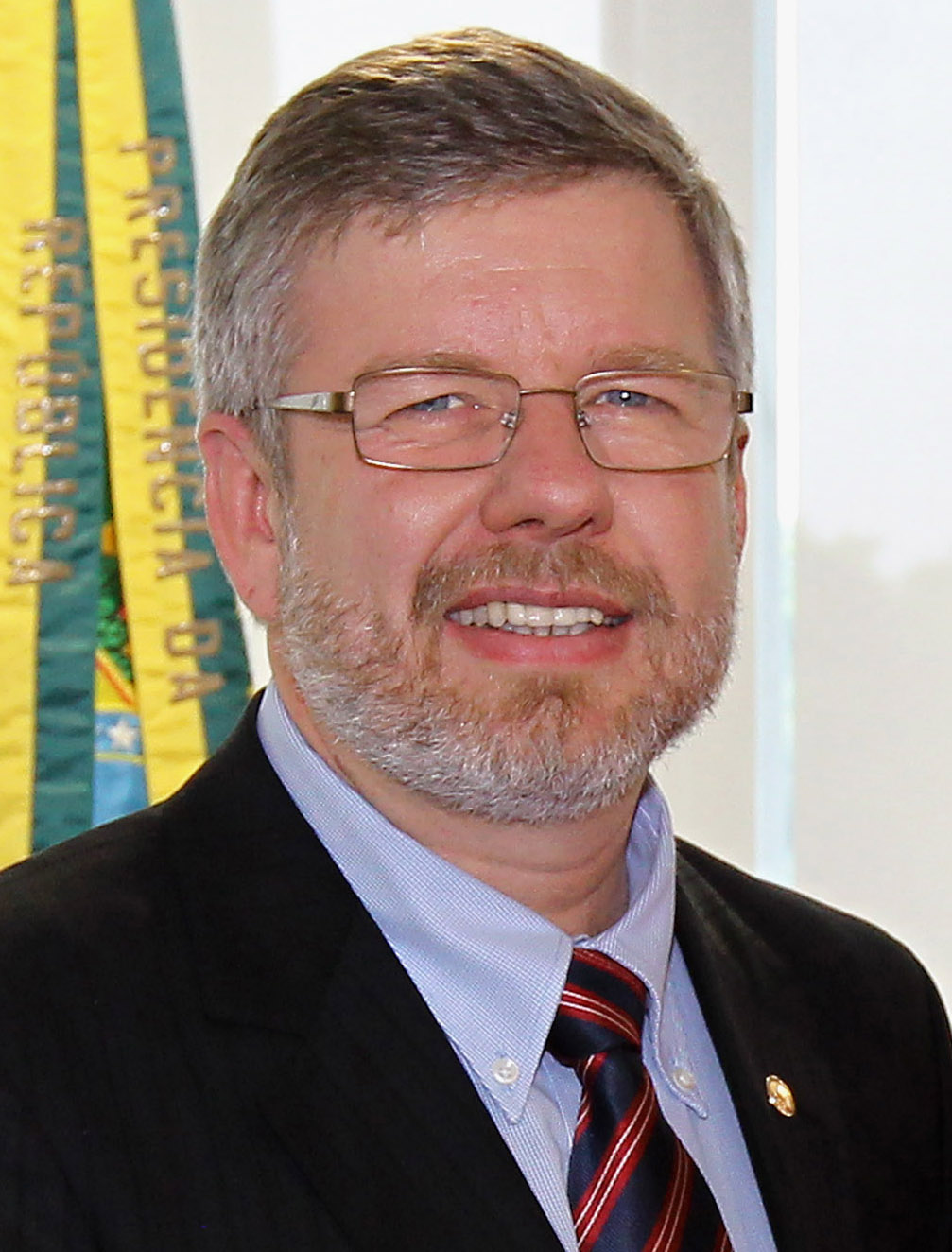

President of the Chamber of Deputies
- In office 1 February 2011 – 4 February 2013
- Preceded by: Michel Temer
- Succeeded by: Henrique Eduardo Alves

First Vice President of the Chamber of Deputies
- In office 2 February 2009 – 1 February 2011
- Preceded by: Nárcio Rodrigues
- Succeeded by: Rose de Freitas

Federal Deputy
- In office 3 January 2005 – 1 February 2019
- Constituency: Rio Grande do Sul

Personal details
- Born: 27 December 1965 (age 60) Canoas, Rio Grande do Sul, Brazil
- Party: Workers' Party

Marco Aurélio Spall Maia, better known as Marco Maia (born 27 December 1965), is a Brazilian politician, and the President of the Chamber of Deputies of Brazil from 2010 to 2013. A metalworker and union leader by trade, Maia joined the Workers' Party in 1985.

Political offices
Preceded by Michel Temer	President of the Chamber of Deputies; 2011–2013	Succeeded by Henrique Eduardo Alves
