= Walter Alves =

Brazilian administrator and politician

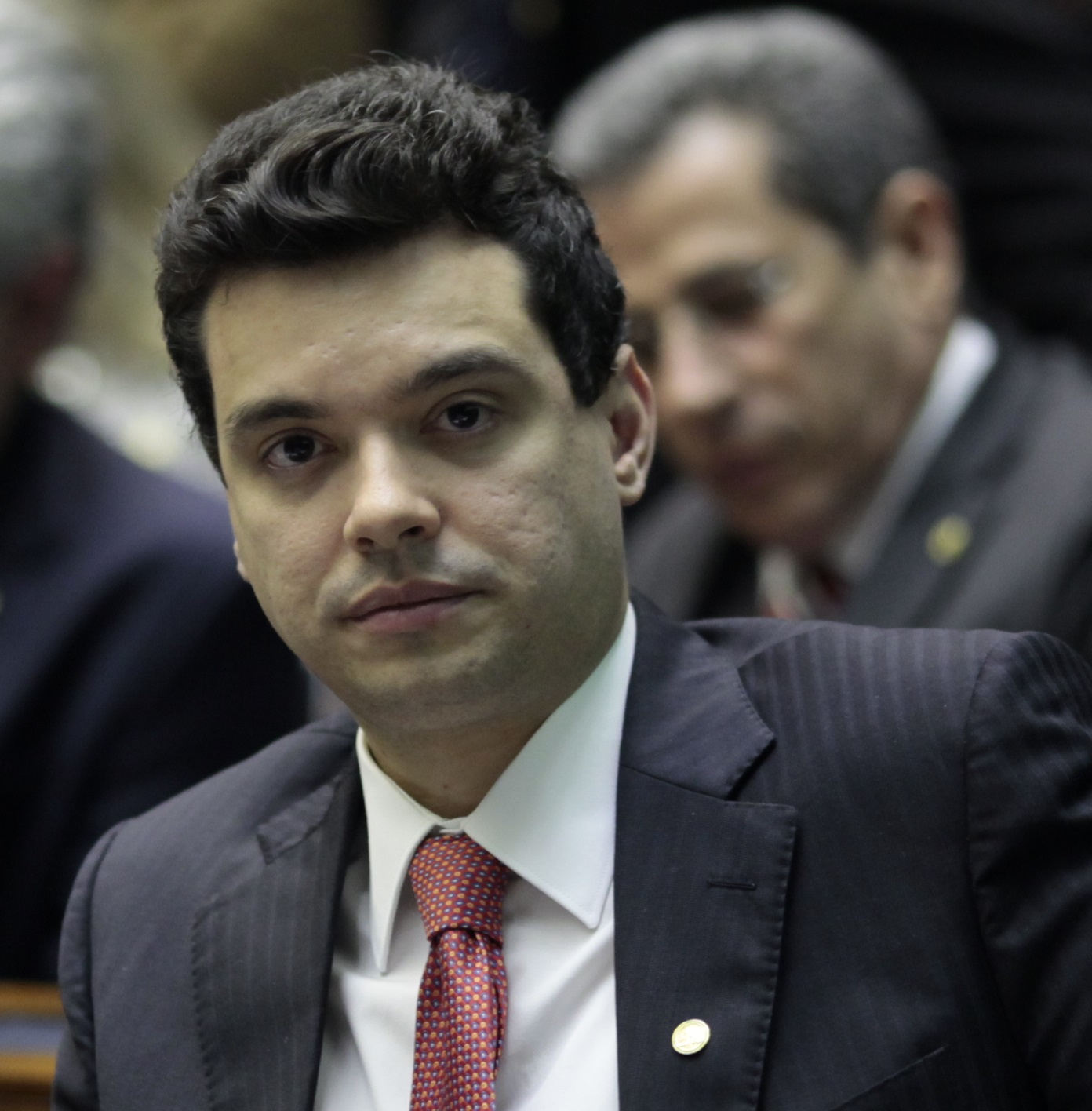

Vice-governor of Rio Grande do Norte
- Incumbent
- Assumed office 1 January 2023
- Governor: Fátima Bezerra
- Preceded by: Antenor Roberto

Federal deputy of Rio Grande do Norte
- In office 1 February 2015 – 1 January 2023

State deputy of Rio Grande do Norte
- In office 1 February 2007 – 31 January 2015

Personal details
- Born: Walter Alves Pereira; 27 February 1980 (age 45) Natal, Rio Grande do Norte, Brazil
- Political party: MDB (2003–present)
- Spouse: Carol Alves
- Children: 2
- Parent: Garibaldi Alves Filho (father)
- Relatives: Aluízio Alves (great-uncle); Garibaldi Alves (grandfather); Carlos Eduardo Alves (cousin); Ana Catarina Alves (cousin); Henrique Eduardo Alves (cousin)

Walter Pereira Alves (born 27 February 1980) is a Brazilian administrator and politician who is affiliated with the Brazilian Democratic Movement (MDB). He is currently the vice governor of the state of Rio Grande do Norte as of 1 January 2023, with Fátima Bezerra as governor. He was also a state deputy and a federal deputy.

Born in Natal, he is the son of former governor and senator Garibaldi Alves Filho and Denise Pereira Alves.

== Political career ==
Alves began his political career as a state deputy in Rio Grande do Norte as part of the PMDB in 2006.

In 2010, he was reelected. He was elected a federal deputy in 2014. As a federal deputy, he voted in favor of the impeachment proceedings against president Dilma Rousseff. During the Michel Temer administration, he voted in favor of the Constitutional Amendment of the Public Expenditure Cap. In August 2017, he voted against the opening of a similar investigation into president Michel Temer, helping to archive the complaint by the Public Prosecutor's Office.
