= Aldo Tinoco =

Aldo Tinoco Filho
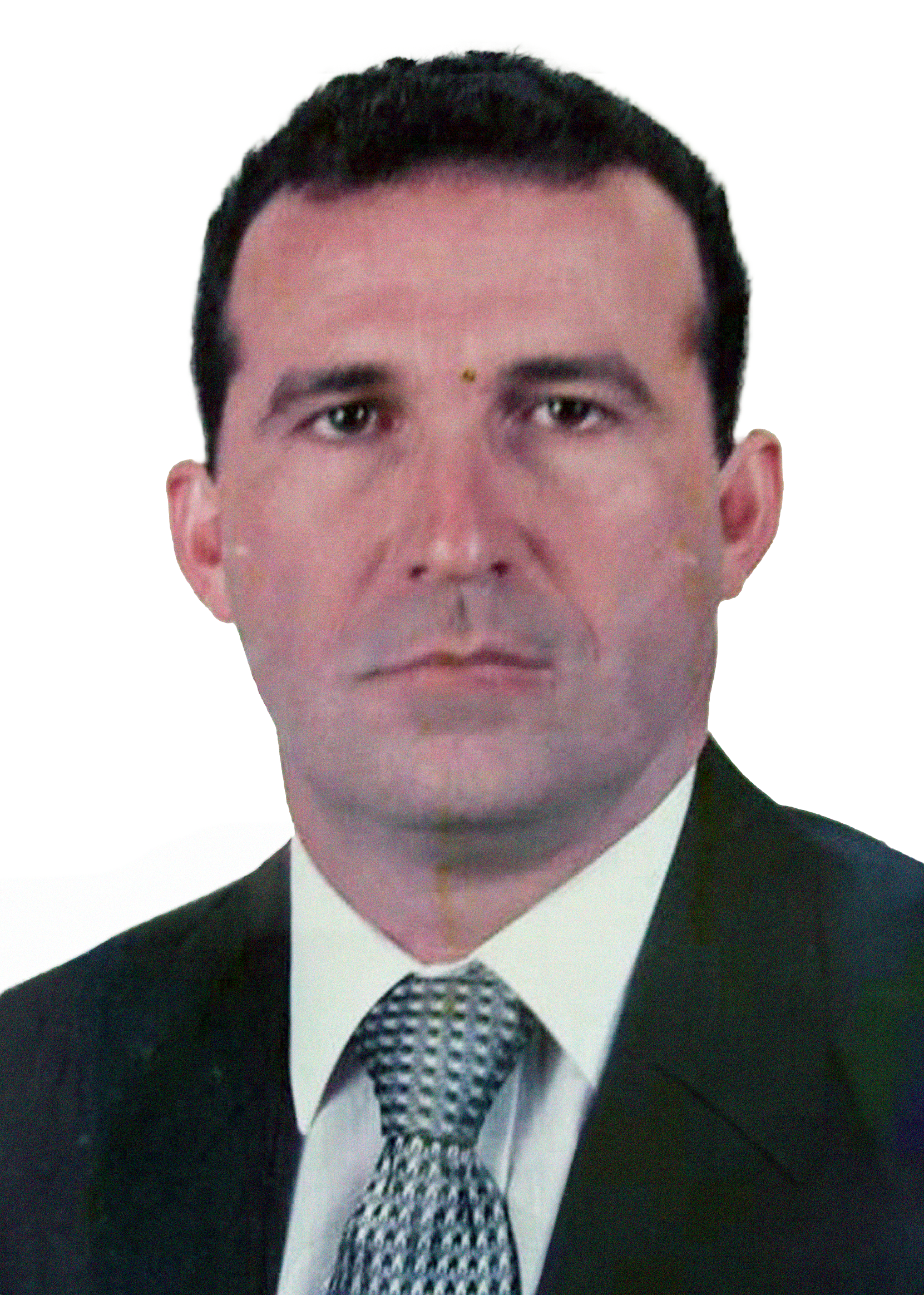

Mayor of Natal
- In office 1 January 1993 – 1 January 1997
- Preceded by: Wilma de Faria
- Succeeded by: Wilma de Faria

Personal details
- Born: 2 January 1957 (age 69) Natal, Rio Grande do Norte, Brazil
- Party: MDB MDB (1970–1979); PMDB (1980–1986); PDT (1986–1988); PSB (1988–1993); PSDB (1993–present)
- Education: University of São Paulo (B.S.); Federal University of Rio Grande do Norte (M.S.)

Aldo da Fonseca Tinoco Filho (born 2 January 1957) is a Brazilian civil engineer, sanitary engineer, and politician currently affiliated with the Brazilian Social Democracy Party (PSDB). He was the mayor of Natal, the capital of the state of Rio Grande do Norte.

== Biography ==
Tinoco was born on 2 January 1957 in Natal. He graduated with a degree in Civil Engineering from the University of São Paulo (USP). He would go on to do post-graduate work in hydraulic engineering at the Escola Politécnica da USP in 1989, and in 2007, earned a master's degree in Sanitary Engineering from Federal University of Rio Grande do Norte (UFRN). He first affiliated himself with the PSB in March 1992.

In 1992, with the support of Wilma de Faria, Tinoco was elected the mayor of Natal for the PSB, beating Henrique Eduardo Alves in the second round. In 1993, he switched affiliation to the PSDB. He left office in 1997. He supported Garibaldi Alves Filho despite being a member of the PSDB.

In 1995, Tinoco was awarded by President Fernando Henrique Cardoso the Order of Military Merit in the Special Commander class.
