= 2016 Brazilian municipal elections =

Local elections in Brazil

- 2 October 2016 (first round); 30 October 2016 (second round, if necessary)

5,570 mayors; 56,810 councillors
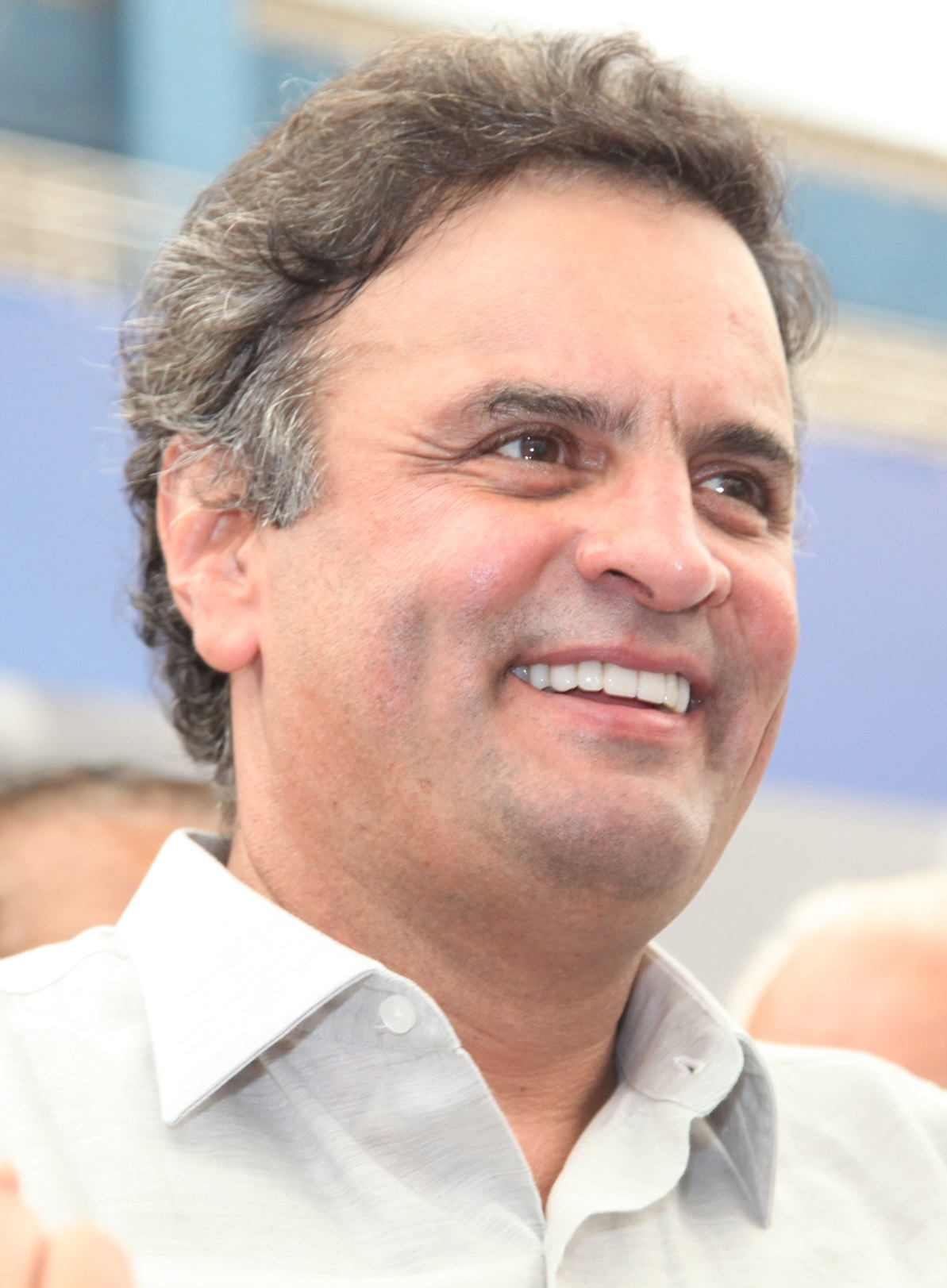

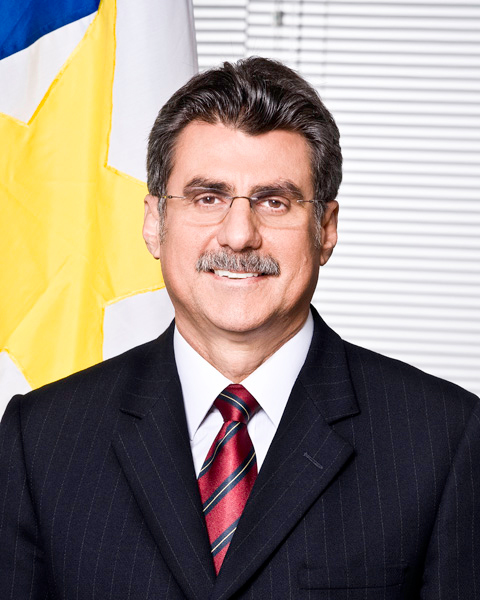

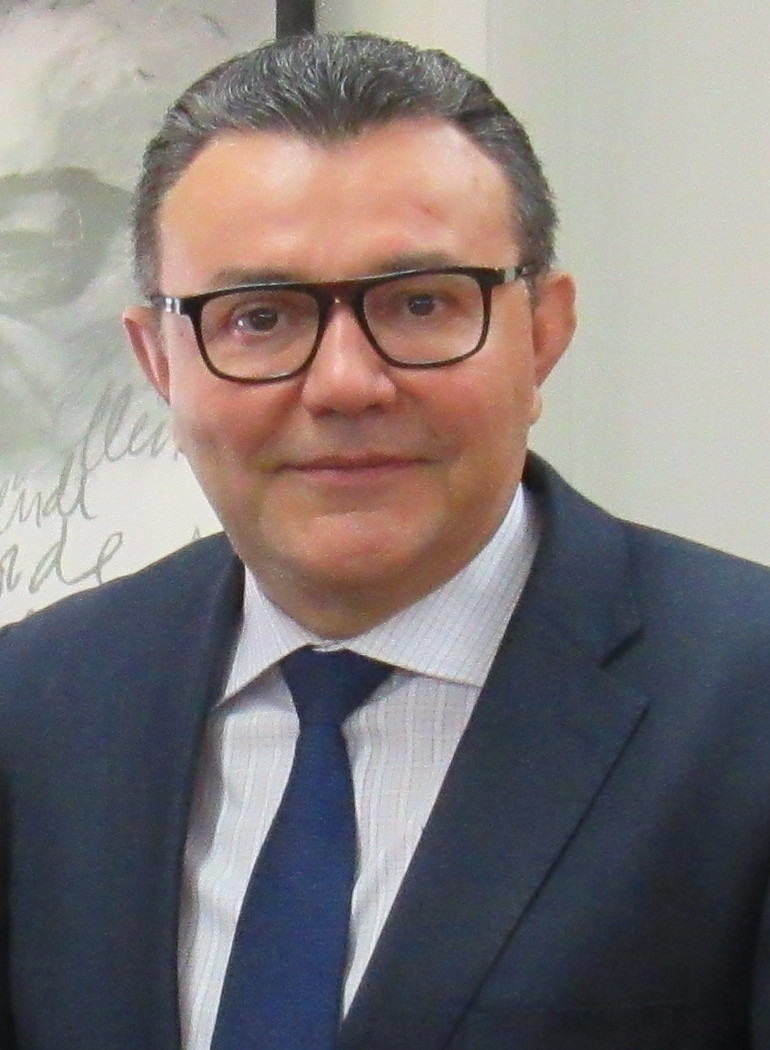

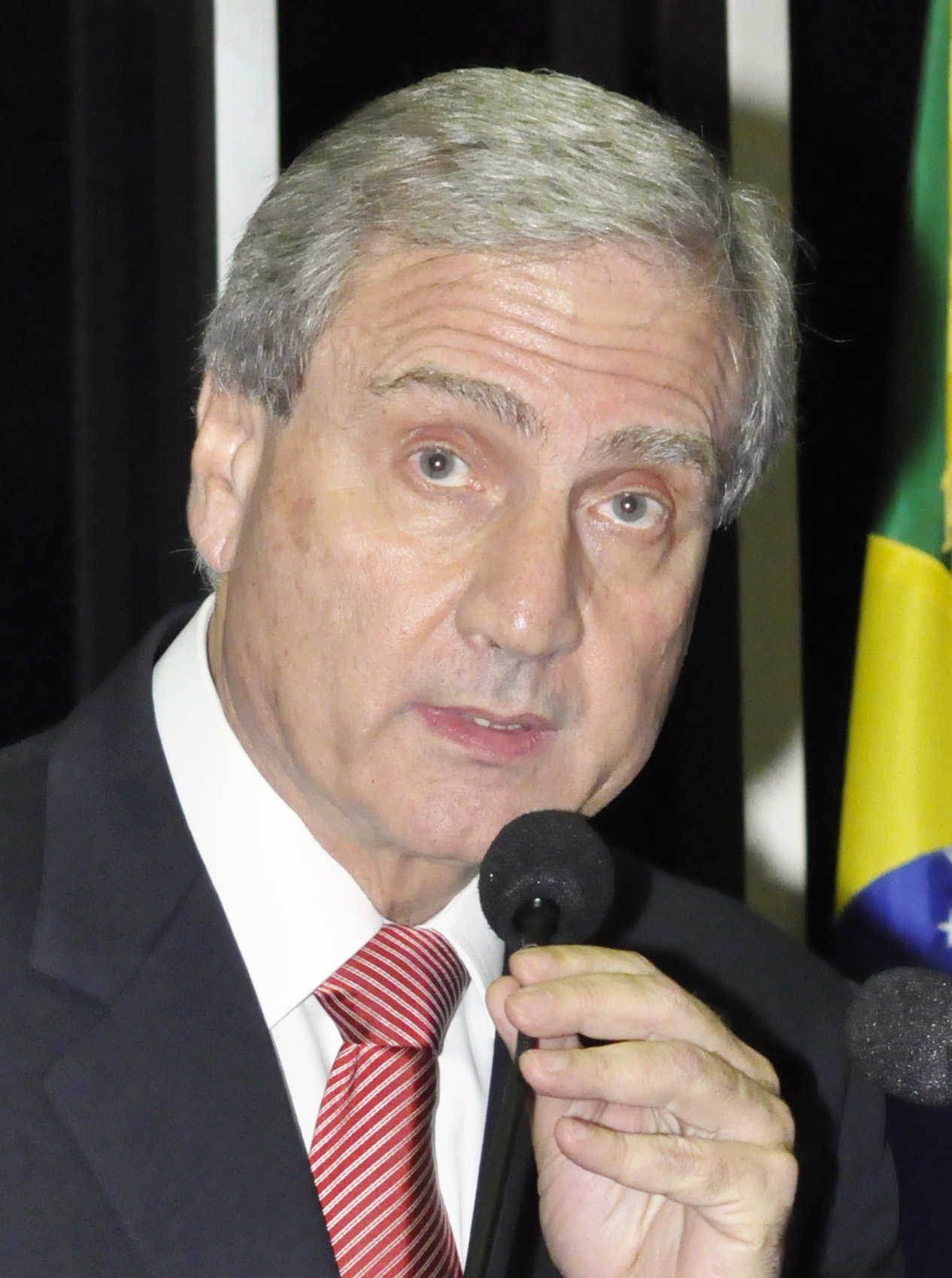

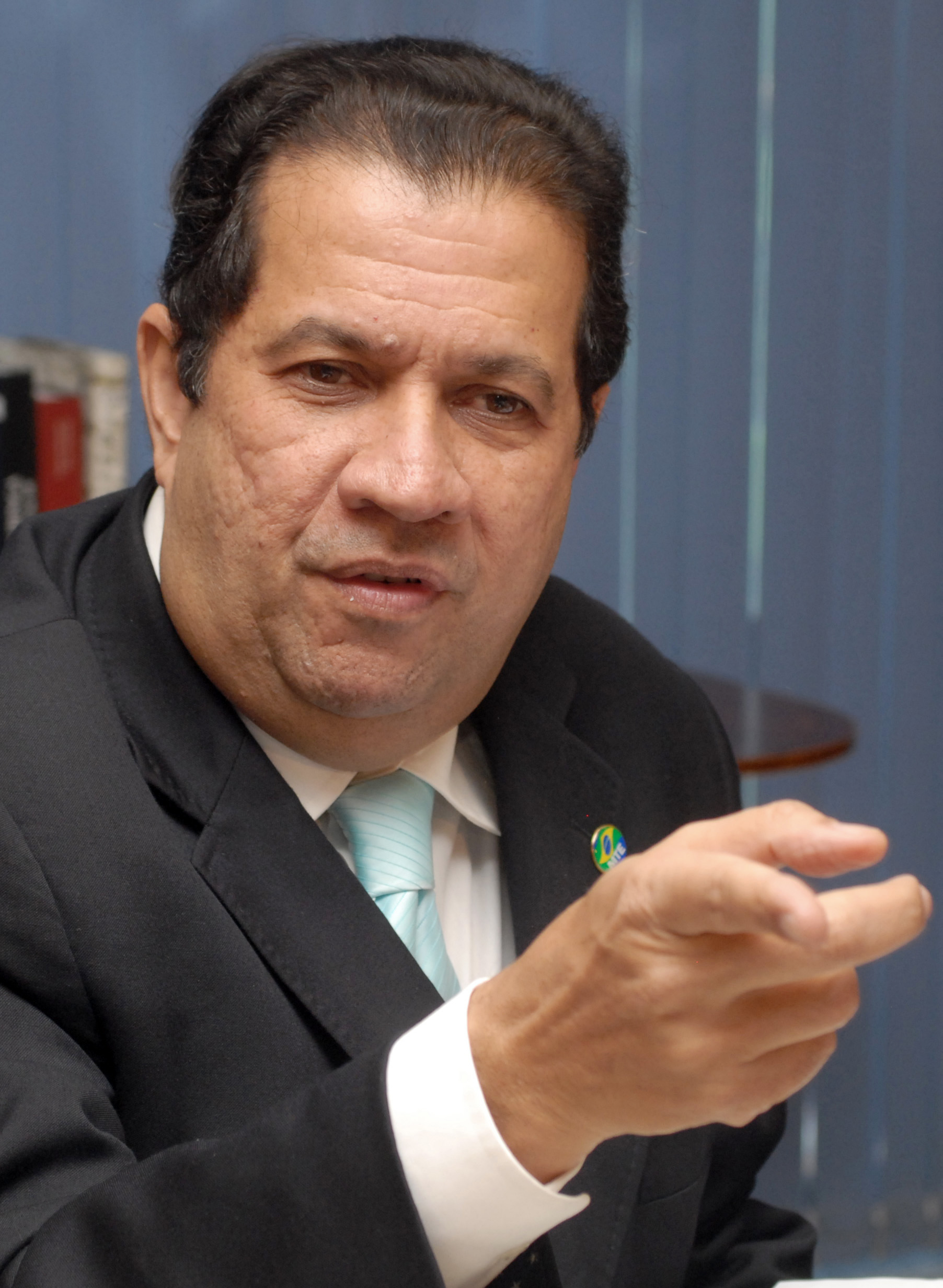

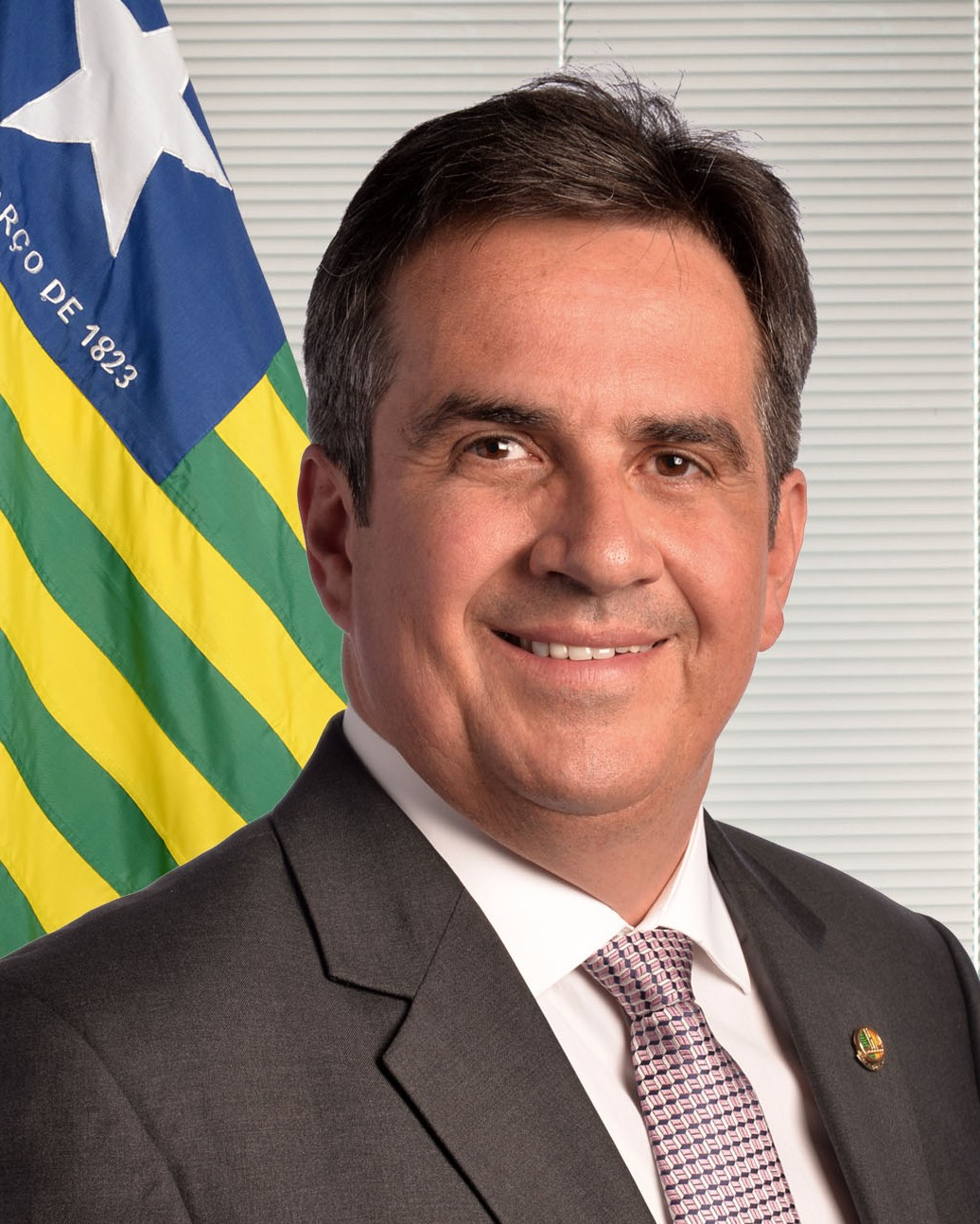
Leader	Aécio Neves	Romero Jucá	Carlos Siqueira
Party	PSDB	MDB	PSB
Leader since	18 May 2013	5 April 2016	13 October 2014
Popular vote	17,633,653	15,026,090	8,407,656
Councillors	5,355	7,551	3,625
Councillors +/–	▲115	▼403	▲75
Mayors	793	1,027	414
Mayors +/–	▲96	▲5	▼20
Leader	Alfredo Cotait Neto	Carlos Lupi	Ciro Nogueira
Party	PSD	PDT	PP
Leader since	8 June 2016	23 July 2004	11 April 2013
Popular vote	8,085,600	6,404,512	5,747,833
Councillors	4,623	3,756	4,730
Councillors +/–	▼23	▲97	▼197
Mayors	654	334	495
Mayors +/–	▼23	▲26	▲24

The Brazilian municipal elections of 2016 took place on 2 October 2016 and on 30 October 2016 (for cities with more than 200,000 voters, where the second round is available). Electors chose mayors, vice-mayors and city councillors of all 5,568 cities of the country. The partisan conventions took place between 20 July and 5 August. The party political broadcast started on 26 August and ended on 29 September. Until 2012, on Mondays, Wednesdays and Fridays there was the broadcast for candidates to city halls, 30 minutes long. The broadcasts for candidates for city councils were broadcast on Tuesdays, Thursdays and Saturdays, also 30 minutes long. At least 97 cities had only one candidate for mayor in these elections. Besides that, 48.8% of the cities of the country didn't have more than two candidates. These were the first elections in which recently registered parties Partido da Mulher Brasileira (PMB), Rede Sustentabilidade (REDE) and Partido Novo (NOVO) participated; they were recognized by the Superior Electoral Court (Portuguese: Tribunal Superior Eleitoral - TSE) in 2015. Some of the most highlighted elected candidates include liberal businessman João Doria (PSDB) in São Paulo and licensed bishop Marcelo Crivella (PRB) in Rio de Janeiro. The elections also took place after the impeachment of Dilma Rousseff and during the investigations of Operation Car Wash (Portuguese: Operação Lava Jato). However, it only affected the left-wing Workers' Party, with its reduction of elected mayors, while the centre-right Brazilian Democratic Movement Party and Progressive Party, with the most of its members investigated, had an increase of elected candidates.

== Results in capitals ==
Result
Capital	Federative unit	Mayor	Vice Mayor	Colligation
Aracaju	Sergipe	Edvaldo Nogueira (PCdoB)	Eliane Aquino (PT)	PCdoB; PT; PMDB; PSD; PRB; PTN; PTdoB; PRP
Belém	Pará	Zenaldo Coutinho (PSDB)	Orlando Reis (PSB)	PSDB; PSB; PTdoB; DEM; PR; PTB; PTN; PSC; SD; PEN; PTC; PSL; PSDC; PMN; PRP
Belo Horizonte	Minas Gerais	Alexandre Kalil (PHS)	Paulo Lamac (REDE)	PHS; REDE; PV
Boa Vista	Roraima	Teresa Surita (PMDB)	Arthur Henrique (PSD)	PMDB; PSD; PR; PSB; PPS; SD; PTdoB; PSDC; PSL; PPL
Campo Grande	Mato Grosso do Sul	Marquinhos Trad (PSD)	Adriane Lopes (PEN)	PSD; PEN; PTB; DEM; PTdoB; PMN; PHS
Cuiabá	Mato Grosso	Emanuel Pinheiro (PMDB)	Niuan Ribeiro (PTB)	PMDB; PTB; PP; PSC; PMB; PR; PROS; SD; PPL; PTdoB; PRP; PTC
Curitiba	Paraná	Rafael Greca (PMN)	Eduardo Pimentel (PSDB)	PMN; PSDB; PSB; DEM; PTdoB; PSDC; PTN
Florianópolis	Santa Catarina	Gean Loureiro (PMDB)	João Batista (PSDB)	PMDB; PSDB; PDT; PRB; PRTB; PSC; PTB; PTN; SD; PRP; PPS; PPL
Fortaleza	Ceará	Roberto Cláudio (PDT)	Moroni Torgan (DEM)	PDT; DEM; PP; PEN; PSC; PSDC; PRTB; PTC; PPS; PTN; PPL; PSL; PV; PTB; PSD; PROS; PMB; PCdoB
Goiânia	Goiás	Iris Rezende (PMDB)	Major Araújo (PRP)	PMDB; PRP; DEM; PDT; PRTB; PTC
João Pessoa	Paraíba	Luciano Cartaxo (PSD)	Manoel Junior (PMDB)	PSD; PMDB; PSDB; PP; SD; PCdoB; PSC; PRB; PSDC; PMB; PHS; PTN
Macapá	Amapá	Clécio Luís (REDE)	Telma Nery (DEM)	REDE; DEM; PSDB; PCdoB; PR; PSC; PPL; PTdoB
Maceió	Alagoas	Rui Palmeira (PSDB)	Marcelo Palmeira (PP)	PSDB; PP; PR; PPS; PDT; DEM; PROS
Manaus	Amazonas	Arthur Virgílio Neto (PSDB)	Marcos Rotta (PMDB)	PSDB; PMDB; PP; PTB; PPS; PV; PHS; PTN; PRP; PPL; PSL
Natal	Rio Grande do Norte	Carlos Eduardo Alves (PDT)	Álvaro Dias (PMDB)	PDT; PMDB; PR; DEM; PTB; PRB; PSC; PROS; PSDC
Palmas	Tocantins	Carlos Amastha (PSB)	Cinthia Ribeiro (PSDB)	PSB; PSDB; PTB; PMN; PSL; PTC; PCdoB; PRP
Porto Alegre	Rio Grande do Sul	Nelson Marchezan Júnior (PSDB)	Gustavo Paim (PP)	PSDB; PP; PMB; PTC; PV
Porto Velho	Rondônia	Hildon Chaves (PSDB)	Edgar do Boi (PSDC)	PSDB; PSDC
Recife	Pernambuco	Geraldo Júlio (PSB)	Luciano Siqueira (PCdoB)	PSB; PCdoB; PMDB; PRTB; PPL; PSC; PR; PMB; PTC; PP; PPS; PSD; PDT; PRP; SD; REDE; PSDC; PROS; PHS; PEN
Rio Branco	Acre	Marcus Alexandre (PT)	Socorro Neri (PSB)	PT; PSB; PTdoB; PPL; PRB; PSL; PRP; PHS; PDT; PROS; PTN; PSDC; PSOL; PV; PSTU
Rio de Janeiro	Rio de Janeiro	Marcelo Crivella (PRB)	Fernando Mac Dowell (PR)	PRB; PR; PTN
Salvador	Bahia	ACM Neto (DEM)	Bruno Soares Reis (PMDB)	DEM; PMDB; PMB; PSDB; PEN; PHS; PPS; PRB; PSC; PTdoB; PSDC; PTB; PTC; PV; SD
São Luís	Maranhão	Edivaldo Holanda Júnior (PDT)	Júlio Pinheiro (PCdoB)	PDT; PCdoB; PTB; PRB; PSC; PR; DEM; PROS; PTC; PSL; PEN; PT
São Paulo	São Paulo	João Doria (PSDB)	Bruno Covas (PSDB)	PSDB; PP; PSB; DEM; PTN; PMN; PR; PPS; PHS; PV; PSL; PMB; PRP; PTC; PTdoB
Teresina	Piauí	Firmino Filho (PSDB)	Luiz Júnior (PMDB)	PSDB; PMDB; PRB; PSB; PSDC; PP; PMB; PV; PSL; SD; PRP; PRTB; PCdoB; PTdoB; PPS; DEM; PDT; PEN; PSC; REDE; PPL
Vitória	Espírito Santo	Luciano Rezende (PPS)	Sérgio Sá (PSB)	PPS; PSB; PCdoB; PRB; PP; PHS; PRP; PPL; REDE; PV; PROS; PEN
