= Carlos Eduardo Alves =

Brazilian lawyer and politician

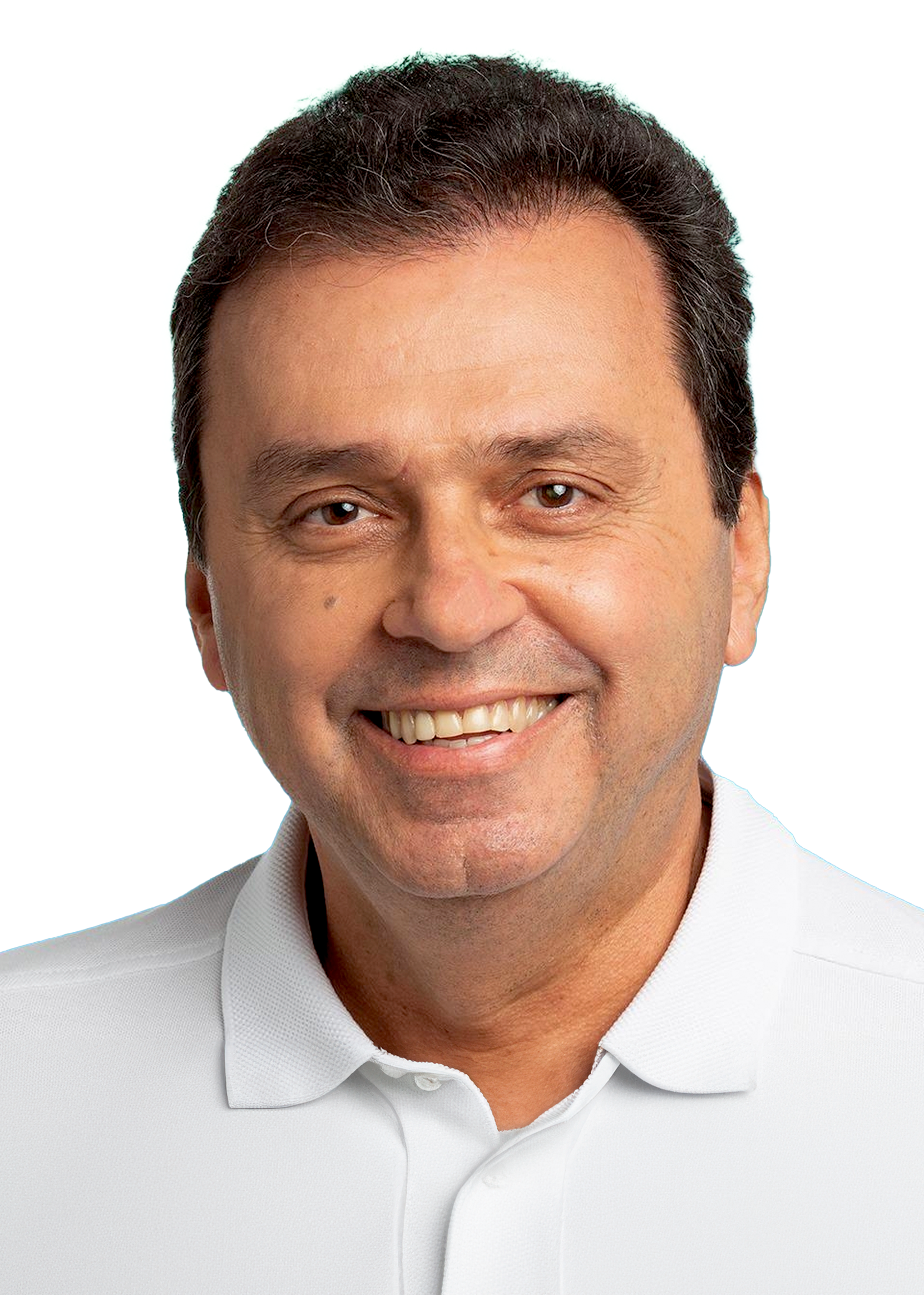

Mayor of Natal
- In office 1 January 2013 – 6 April 2018
- Vice-mayor: Wilma de Faria (2013–2017); Álvaro Costa Dias (2017–2020)
- Vice-mayor: None (2002–2005); Micarla de Sousa (2005–2007); None (2007–2009)
- Preceded by: Ney Lopes Júnior
- Succeeded by: Álvaro Costa Dias
- In office 5 April 2002 – 1 January 2009
- Preceded by: Wilma de Faria
- Succeeded by: Micarla de Sousa

Vice-mayor of Natal
- In office 1 January 2001 – 5 April 2002
- Preceded by: Marcílio Carrilho
- Succeeded by: Micarla de Sousa

Secretary of the Interior, Justice, and Citizenship of Rio Grande do Norte
- In office 1 January 1995 – 1 January 2001

State deputy of Rio Grande do Norte
- In office 1 February 1987 – 1 January 2001

Personal details
- Born: Carlos Eduardo Nunes Alves; 5 June 1959 (age 67) Rio de Janeiro, Brazil
- Party: PMDB (1980–2002); PSB (2002–2009); PDT (2009–2023); PSD (2023–present)
- Spouse: Andréa Ramalho Pereira de Araújo Alves
- Parent: Agnelo Alves (father)
- Relatives: Aluízio Alves (uncle); Garibaldi Alves (uncle); Garibaldi Alves Filho (cousin); Ana Catarina Alves (cousin); Henrique Eduardo Alves (cousin); Walter Alves (cousin)
- Education: Universidade Santa Úrsula

Carlos Eduardo Nunes Alves (born 5 June 1959) is a Brazilian lawyer and politician, who was the mayor of the city of Natal from 2002 to 2009, and again from 2013 to 2018. During his second term, he won the election in 2012, and began his mandate on 1 January 2013. He was reelected in the first round in 2016 with 63.42% of the vote, totaling 225,741 votes. On 6 April 2018, he announced his resignation to run to be governor of the state of Rio Grande do Norte that year.

== Biography ==
Alves graduated with a law degree from Universidade Santa Úrsula, though he never became a lawyer because he never had registered with the Order of Attorneys of Brazil (OAB). Coming from a politically prominent family, he is the son of former Natal mayor Agnelo Alves, who had been removed from office during the Brazilian military dictatorship due to his family's opposition to the regime. Carlos Eduardo Alves later entered into politics in Natal and became a state deputy in 1986. His uncles were ex-governor of Rio Grande do Norte Aluízio Alves, through whom Henrique Eduardo Alves is his cousin, and former senator Garibaldi Alves, through whom Garibaldi Alves Filho is also his cousin.

In 2000, he was elected vice-mayor of Natal, having assumed the mayoralty in 2002 after the resignation of then-mayor Wilma de Faria, to run for governor. He was reelected in his own right in 2004.

After ending his mandate, Alves was caught in scandals involving the expiration of eight tons of medicine that were stored by his administration that were later discarded.

In 2010, he ran for governor of Rio Grande do Norte as part of the Democratic Labour Party (PDT), receiving third place with 160,828 votes (10.37%) and not advancing to the second round. The winner was Rosalba Ciarlini of the Democrats.

During the 2012 municipal elections in Natal, Alves once again became a candidate for mayor for the PDT, with former governor Wilma de Faria of the PSB as his vice-mayoral pick. On 7 October, he came in first place with 153,464 votes (40.42%). He moved on to the second round on 28 October against Hermano Moraes of the PMDB. He was elected in the second round with 214,687 votes, or 58.31% of the vote.

Alves ran for reelection in 2016, and won reelection in the first round, with 225,741 votes, or 63.42% of the vote. He took office on 1 January 2017.

On 6 April 2018, he announced that he would resign from office to run to be governor of Rio Grande do Norte later that year. His vice-mayor, Álvaro Costa Dias, assumed the mayoralty. He advanced to the second round, but lost to then-senator Fátima Bezerra.

== Electoral history ==
Year	Election	Party	Position	Votes	%	Result	Ref
1986	Rio Grande do Norte state elections	PMDB	State deputy	24,367	2.62%	Won	
1990	Rio Grande do Norte state elections	PMDB	State deputy	14,920	1.57%	Won	
1994	Rio Grande do Norte state elections	PMDB	State deputy	21,556	2.67%	Won	
1998	Rio Grande do Norte state elections	PMDB	State deputy	41,689	3.71%	Won	
2000	Natal municipal elections	PMDB	Vice-mayor	178,016	57.71%	Won	
2004	Natal municipal elections	PSB	Mayor	137,664	37.30% (1st round)	Won	
2004	Natal municipal elections	PSB	Mayor	192,513	51.92% (2nd round)	Won	
2010	Rio Grande do Norte state elections	PDT	Governor	160,828	10.37%	Lost	
2012	Natal municipal elections	PDT	Mayor	153,464	40.42% (1st round)	Won	
2012	Natal municipal elections	PDT	Mayor	214,687	58,31% (2nd round)	Won	
2016	Natal municipal elections	PDT	Mayor	225,741	63.42%	Won	
2018	Rio Grande do Norte state elections	PDT	Governor	525,933	32.04% (1st round)	Lost	
2018	Rio Grande do Norte state elections	PDT	Governor	753,035	42.40% (2nd round)	Lost	
2022	Rio Grande do Norte state elections	PDT	Senator	565,235	33.40%	Lost	
2024	Natal municipal elections	PSD	Mayor	93,013	23.95%	Lost	
