= Cemitério Morada da Paz =

Cemetery in Pernambuco, Brazil

Coordinates: 5.8784387°S 35.2331738°W

Cemitério Morada da Paz is a cemetery located in Natal, Brazil.

== Notable interments ==
- Aluízio Alves – politician for the state of Rio Grande do Norte, Brazil
- Wilma de Faria - 54th governor of Rio Grande do Norte
- Armando Monteiro Filho – minister of Agriculture
- Cléber Santana Loureiro – footballer
- Ariano Vilar Suassuna – writer and playwright
