= Alessandro Teixeira =

Brazilian economist

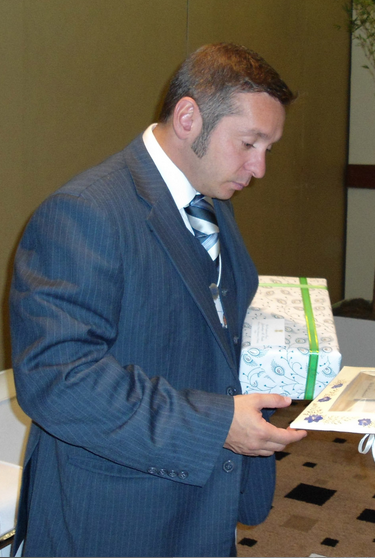

Minister of Tourism
- In office 22 April 2016 – 12 May 2016
- President: Dilma Rousseff
- Preceded by: Henrique Eduardo Alves
- Succeeded by: Henrique Eduardo Alves

Personal details
- Born: Alessandro Golombiewski Teixeira; 1972 (age 53–54) Porto Alegre, Rio Grande do Sul, Brazil
- Spouse: Milena Santos (m. 2016)
- Education: University of São Paulo (B.Ec.)

Alessandro Golombiewski Teixeira is a Brazilian economist. From April to May 2016, he was Brazil´s Minister of Tourism and left after Dilma Rousseff was impeached.

From 2015-2016 he was President of the Brazilian Agency for Industrial Development. From 2013 to 2014 Golombiewski Teixeira was Special Advisor of the President of Brazil and from 2010 to 2013 Deputy Minister of Development, Industry and International Trade.

He is a visiting scholar at Columbia University in New York City and is a member of the board of Suzano Group in São Paulo.

== Education ==
Mr. Golombiewski Teixeira holds a PhD in Management of Technology and Innovation from the University of Sussex, England, a master's degree in Latin American Economics from the University of São Paulo and a BA in Economics from the Federal University of Rio Grande do Sul.

== Career ==
As Deputy Minister, Golombiewski also spearheaded several trade negotiations. On the bilateral level, Golombiewski led the Brazil-Argentina trade dialogue, Brazil-Japan talks, Brazil-China, Brazil-India, Brazil-Mexico, Brazil-Venezuela among others. On the multi-lateral level, he helped Brazil’s efforts in the context of the BRICS as well as in different stages of the trade negotiation of the Doha Round Golombiewski Teixeira was also Executive Secretary of the U.S.-Brazil CEO Forum, the UK-Brazil CEO Forum, theIndia-Brazil CEO Forum and the US-Brazil Biofuels Forum as well as a member of the US-Brazil Innovation Partnership and World Economic Forum.

From 2000 to 2001, Golombiewski Teixeira was a consultant to the National Health Service (NHS) of the British Government, and to the International Academy of Sciences (ICSU), in Paris. From 1998 to 2000 he served as Director of Foreign Affairs of the state government of Rio Grande do Sul. From 1996 to 1998 Golombiewski Teixeira was an economic consultant for the Brazilian Foundation for Economic Studies (Fipe).

From 1995 to 1996, Golombiewski Teixeira was a project manager at RBS Telecommunications Group in Porto Alegre, Brazil. .gov.br/

=== Academic life ===
Golombiewski Teixeira presented over 900 lectures in five continents covering themes such as the Brazilian Economy, Latin American economy, international and industrial economy, management of innovation, international investments, development policies, international business strategy, and international trade, among many other topics.

He have also maintained academic involvement throughout his career. He held research and lecturing positions for the last 20 years in different Universities such as Columbia University-USA, University of Sussex-UK, University of São Paulo-Brasil, Federal University of Rio Grande do Sul- Brasil and University of Vale dos Sinos- Brasil in different disciplines such, economics, management of innovation, international trade strategy, business management, E-Business, Public Policy and Development Economics.

== List of prizes, medals and awards ==
- In 2014 Alessandro Golombiewski was nominated “Comendador da Ordem do Mérito da Defesa” [in the Portuguese original] these command of the Order of Defense was an award instituted in 2002 to acknowledge military as well as civil personalities considered to have given a substantial contribution to Brazil’s Development.
- Golombiewski was also nominated - February 2012 as one of the 40th youngest country Personality. He was the only public sector nominee contemplated by the Brazilian magazine, “Época”.
- In 2008, he also was nominated as “FDI Personality of the Year 2008 - Latin America” by the prestigious British newspaper The Financial Times.
- In April 2007, Golombiewski was granted with “Comenda da Ordem do Rio Branco” [in thePortuguese original]. This command award is granted by the Brazilian government to those who made relevant contributions to the country on the international stage. Subsequently, in 2012, Golombiewski was sealed with the utmost degree of Grand Official of this same order of the Rio Branco Baron (Rio Branco was Brazil’s most revered top diplomat).
- In 1998, Alessandro Golombiewski received a nomination and was awarded as “Young Leader” by the Japanese Sasakawa Foundation.

== Personal life ==
Alessandro Golombiewski Teixeira was born in Porto Alegre, 12-06-71 in the State of Rio Grande do Sul, Brazil. He is married to Milena Golombiewski.

Political offices
Preceded by Henrique Eduardo Alves	Minister of Tourism; 2016	Succeeded by Henrique Eduardo Alves
