= Garibaldi Alves Filho =

Brazilian politician

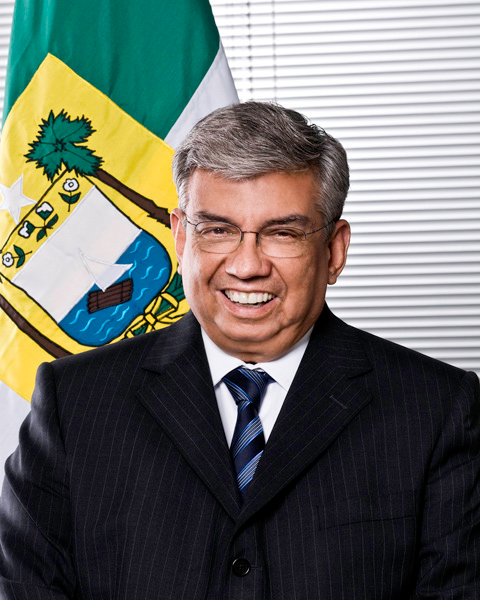

Senator for Rio Grande do Norte
- In office 1 January 2015 – 1 February 2019
- Preceded by: Paulo Davim
- Succeeded by: Styvenson Valentim
- In office 1 February 2011 – 3 February 2011
- Preceded by: João Faustino
- Succeeded by: Paulo Davim
- In office 13 November 2010 – 31 December 2010
- Preceded by: João Faustino
- Succeeded by: João Faustino
- In office 1 February 2003 – 14 July 2010
- Preceded by: Geraldo Melo
- Succeeded by: João Faustino
- In office 1 February 1991 – 1 January 1995
- Preceded by: Carlos Alberto de Sousa
- Succeeded by: Fernando Bezerra

Minister of Social Security
- In office 1 January 2011 – 1 January 2015
- President: Dilma Rousseff
- Preceded by: Carlos Eduardo Gabas
- Succeeded by: Carlos Eduardo Gabas

President of the Federal Senate
- In office 12 December 2007 – 1 February 2009
- Preceded by: Renan Calheiros
- Succeeded by: José Sarney

Governor of Rio Grande do Norte
- In office 1 January 1995 – 5 April 2002
- Vice Governor: Fernando Freire
- Preceded by: Vivaldo Costa
- Succeeded by: Fernando Freire

Mayor of Natal
- In office 1 January 1986 – 1 January 1989
- Vice Mayor: Roberto Furtado
- Preceded by: Marcos César Formiga
- Succeeded by: Wilma de Faria

Member of the Legislative Assembly of Rio Grande do Norte
- In office 1 February 1971 – 1 January 1986
- Constituency: At-large

Personal details
- Born: 4 February 1947 (age 79) Natal, Rio Grande do Norte, Brazil
- Party: MDB (1970–present)
- Spouse: Denise Pereira Alves
- Children: Walter Alves
- Parent: Garibaldi Alves (father)
- Relatives: Aluízio Alves (uncle); Agnelo Alves (uncle); Carlos Eduardo Alves (cousin); Ana Catarina Alves (cousin); Henrique Eduardo Alves (cousin)

Garibaldi Alves Filho (born 4 February 1947) is a Brazilian politician and former President of the Federal Senate.

Filho was born in Natal, Rio Grande do Norte. Prior to his appointment as President of the Senate, he served as a deputy to the Rio Grande do Norte Legislative Assembly for four legislative sessions (1971–1985), mayor of Natal (1986–1989), and governor of Rio Grande do Norte for two successive periods (1995–2002). One of the main focuses of his governorship was water resources: he succeeded in providing an estimated 1 million people with a clean water supply and in reducing infant mortality by almost 60%.

He is a member of the Brazilian Democratic Movement Party (PMDB), prior to which he belonged to its predecessor, the MDB. His current Senate term (his second, having previously been elected for the 1991–98 period) runs until 2011. He was elected President of the Senate on 12 December 2007, with 68 votes for, eight against, and two abstentions. He served as the President of Senate until 2009.

Garibaldi Alves Filho served the Minister of Social Welfare from 2011 to 2015.

== See also ==
- List of mayors of Natal, Rio Grande do Norte

Political offices
Preceded by Carlos Eduardo Gabas	Minister of Social Security; 2011–2015	Succeeded by Carlos Eduardo Gabas
Preceded by Tião Viana (acting)	President of the Federal Senate; 2007–2009	Succeeded by José Sarney
Preceded by Vivaldo Costa	Governor of Rio Grande do Norte; 1995–2002	Succeeded by Fernando Freire
Preceded by Marcos César Formiga	Mayor of Natal; 1986–1989	Succeeded by Wilma de Faria
