= Aluízio Alves =

Brazilian journalist and politician (1921–2006)

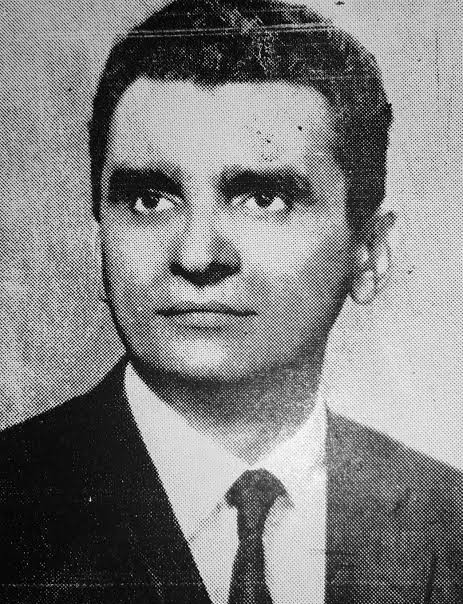

Governor of Rio Grande do Norte
- In office 31 January 1961 – 31 January 1966
- Preceded by: Dinarte Mariz
- Succeeded by: Walfredo Gurgel
- Vice Governor: Walfredo Gurgel (1961–1962); Theodorico Bezerra (1962–1966)

Minister of State Extraordinary for Administration Affairs
- In office 15 March 1985 – 4 September 1986
- Preceded by: Office established
- Succeeded by: Office abolished

Minister of Regional Integration
- In office 8 April 1994 – 1 January 1995
- Preceded by: Office established
- Succeeded by: Office abolished

Federal deputy of Rio Grande do Norte
- In office 5 February 1946 – 31 January 1961
- In office 1 February 1967 – 21 October 1969
- In office 1 February 1991 – 1 February 1995

Personal details
- Born: 11 August 1921 Angicos, Rio Grande do Norte, Brazil
- Died: 6 May 2006 (aged 84) Natal, Rio Grande do Norte, Brazil
- Party: UDN (1945–1957); PSD (1957–1965); MDB (2011–2020); ARENA (1965–1969); PP (1979–1980); PMDB (1980–2006)
- Spouse: Ivone Lira Alves (m. 1944-2003)
- Children: Ana Catarina Alves, Henrique Eduardo Alves
- Relatives: Agnelo Alves (brother); Garibaldi Alves (brother); Garibaldi Alves Filho (nephew); Carlos Eduardo Alves (nephew); Walter Alves (great-nephew)

Aluízio Alves (11 August 1921 – 6 May 2006) was a Brazilian journalist, lawyer, and politician. He was the governor of the state of Rio Grande do Norte, from 1961 to 1966, later being arrested by the Brazilian military dictatorship through Institutional Act Number Five (AI-5) in 1969. He was a member of the politically prominent Alves family, which has competed with the Maia family for dominance in the political scene for decades. His son is former federal deputy and minister Henrique Eduardo Alves. His other brothers Agnelo and Garibaldi, and their sons, including Carlos Eduardo and Garibaldi Filho, were and are major politicians in their own right.

== Early life and education ==
Alves was born on 11 August 1921 in Angicos. He was the son of Manuel Alves Filho and Maria Fernandes Alves. He was a lawyer who graduated with a degree in Juridical and Social Sciences from the School of Law of Maceió and a specialization in Social Services, returned to his journalistic activities after graduation.

He first worked as an employee at A Razão and A República, both based in Natal. He moved to Rio de Janeiro in 1949 and became editor in chief to Tribuna da Imprensa, owned by Carlos Lacerda. Returning to his home state the year after, he founded and led Tribuna do Norte. He also was a Cabinet Official with the state Intervenors office, chief of the State Service of Reeducation and Social Assistance (SERAS), and state director of the Brazilian Legion of Assistance. He went on to become the director of communication at Rádio Cabugi, TV Cabugi, and Rádio Difusora de Mossoró.

== Career ==
Alves with Abelardo de Araújo Jurema in 1963

Alves' political trajectory came in response to his professional activities and his debut on the political scene received the blessings of José Augusto Medeiros and Dinarte Mariz, chief leader of the state's UDN branch. Alves was elected to be a federal deputy in 1945 and participated in the Constituent National Assembly to promulgate the new post-Vargas Constitution on 18 September 1946. He was reelected in 1950, 1954, and 1958, and came to be the secretary-general of the UDN and vice-leader of the party's delegation.

The figurehead of Mariz' elevation to state government in 1955, he broke with his alliance in face of an episode where the recently elected governor ignored a series of actions by the government that were brought together by Alves in an extensive agreement. Angered, he withdrew politically from his mentor, became a member of the PSD, and was elected governor in 1960, beating deputy Djalma Marinho to the distaste of Mariz.

His political advertising during this election season, including the "Cruzada da esperança" campaign, is considered to be an early pioneering project in the state's political campaigns. His governance marked a period where populism was a driving force in the politics of Rio Grande do Norte. During his governorship, he implemented programs to bring access to electricity across the state through the São Francisco Hydroelectric Company (Chesf), expand literacy rates in the state, made major reforms to the state social welfare system, and with creating the Cidade da Esperança, the first subsidized housing project in Latin America.

The animosity between the two leaders grew as time went by, and Mariz came to command the political scene at the outset of the military dictatorship. This did not, however, prevent the return of Alves, with him joining ARENA and becoming a federal deputy again in 1966 after Mariz vetoed his candidacy for senator. In the year prior, Alves beat Mariz in the state elections with the election of monsignor Walfredo Gurgel for governor.

A setback came on 7 February 1969, as he was removed from office by the military dictatorship through AI-5 due to accusations of corruption which were documented in a case that had been dismissed in February 1973. Even without power, he began to participate directly in politics, using his experience and influence to take his acquaintances and followers to the MDB in 1970. His business connections also helped to maintain good relations with the ARENA establishment, save for Mariz.

An executive with the Union of Brazilian Businesses, Alves expanded his activities beyond the area of communications, and after the reintroduction of a multiparty system in Brazil in the waning days of the dictatorship, he became a member of the Peoples' Party. He soon became a member of the PMDB. He ran for governor of Rio Grande do Norte in 1982, but lost to José Agripino Maia of the PDS.

A strong supporter of Tancredo Neves' candidacy for president, he was nominated to be the Administrative Minister by the president-elect, later being confirmed for the position by his successor José Sarney, a post to which he served from 15 March 1985 to 15 February 1989. During his time as minister, the National School of Public Administration (ENAP) was created.

In 1990, he was once again elected to become federal deputy, a position in which he would soon briefly resign from during the Itamar Franco administration to become his Minister of Regional Integration from 8 April 1994 to 1 January 1995. As the minister in this office, he took over the transposition project with the São Francisco River.

== Personal life ==
Aluízio Alves married Ivone Lyra in 1944, with whom they had two children: twins Ana Catarina Alves and Henrique Eduardo Alves, both federal deputies and the latter also being a former Chamber of Deputies president and minister; and Henrique José Alves.

== Death & legacy ==
Alves died in Natal in 2006 due to cerebral ischemia. He is buried at Cemitério Morada da Paz.

The full name of Greater Natal International Airport is in part named after Alves.
