= Carlos Castello Branco =

Brazilian journalist and writer (1920–1993)

- Born: June 25, 1920; Teresina, Brazil
- Died: June 1, 1993 (aged 72); Rio de Janeiro, Brazil
- Occupations: Journalist and writer
- Spouse: Élvia Castello Branco
- Parents: Cristino Castello Branco (father); Dulcila Santanna (mother)

Carlos Castello Branco (Teresina, June 25, 1920 – Rio de Janeiro, June 1, 1993) was a Brazilian journalist and writer. He was a member of the Academia Brasileira de Letras and of the Academia Piauiense de Letras. The column that he maintained in the Jornal do Brasil is a landmark of political journalism. His collected papers are kept in the Archive-Museum of Brazilian Literature, part of the Fundação Casa de Rui Barbosa.

== Biography ==
Castelinho, as he was known, was born Teresina, in the Brazilian State of Piauí on June 25, 1920, the son of Cristino Castello Branco and Dulcila Santanna. He obtained a law degree in Minas Gerais (1943), but his life was dedicated to journalism. He started with Diários Associados in 1939 and, after assuming positions of leadership, resolved to dedicate himself to political reporting, initially in O Jornal (1949), then in Diário Carioca and in the magazine O Cruzeiro. He started his career in literature with Continhos Brasileiros (1952).

He was press secretary in the short government of Jânio Quadros in 1961. With the resignation of Quadros, he took over as head of the branch of the Jornal do Brasil, in Brasília from 1962 to 1972. There, the Coluna do Castello was born. It was read, appreciated and feared by politicians, since it was written by someone intimate with the backstage dealings of power and a shrewd interpreter of the political reality. He maintained this newspaper column until the end of his life. His column is considered the most important work of Brazilian political journalism to date.

His posthumously released work, A Renuncia de Jânio (1996) is considered one of the best accounts of the resignation of Jânio Quadros, due to his close involvement in the affair.

Invited by the journalists Armando Rollemberg, Hélio Doyle and Carlos Marchi, he agreed to be a candidate for the presidency of the Union of Journalists of the Federal District, which was currently dominated by a group sympathetic to the military dictatorship. His slate defeated that headed by Arnaldo Ramos, which was running for re-election in 1976. During his leadership of the Union, Castello constantly confronted the junta, but doing it with diplomacy, trying not to create friction.

After the issuing of Institutional Act Number 5 (Ato Institucional Número Cinco, in Portuguese) by the military dictatorship, the press in Brazil was severely censored and restricted. But even with all these setbacks, he was able to fulfil his term in 1981. The auditorium of the Union bears his name in his honor.

Because of his struggle for press freedom, he won various international awards, like the Maria Moors Cabot prize, from Columbia University and the Mergenthaler Prize from the Inter American Press Association, as well as the Nereu Ramos Prize from the University of Santa Catarina and the Prêmio Almirante.

He was a member of the Academia Piauiense de Letras, Pen Clube do Brasil and the Associação Nacional de Escritores.

Married for 44 years to Élvia Castello Branco (married December 11, 1948), minister of the Tribunal de Contas da União, they had three children, Rodrigo, Luciana and Pedro. Rodrigo died in a car accident in 1976 at age 25.

He had health problems beginning in 1986. Castelo died in 1993. He is buried in the Academia de Letras Brasileira's mausoleum in São João Batista Cemetery in Rio de Janeiro.

== Academia Brasileira de Letras ==
He was elected to chair 34 of the Academia Brasileira de Letras, in 1982.

== Bibliography ==
- Continhos brasileiros (1952)
- Arco de triunfo, romance (1959)
- Introdução à Revolução de 1964, 2 vols. (1975)
- Os militares no poder, 4 vols. (1977, 1978, 1980 and 1981)
- Retratos e fatos da história recente (1994)
- A renúncia de Jânio (1996)
- Retratos e fatos da história recente (1996)
