= Henrique Eduardo Alves =

Brazilian politician

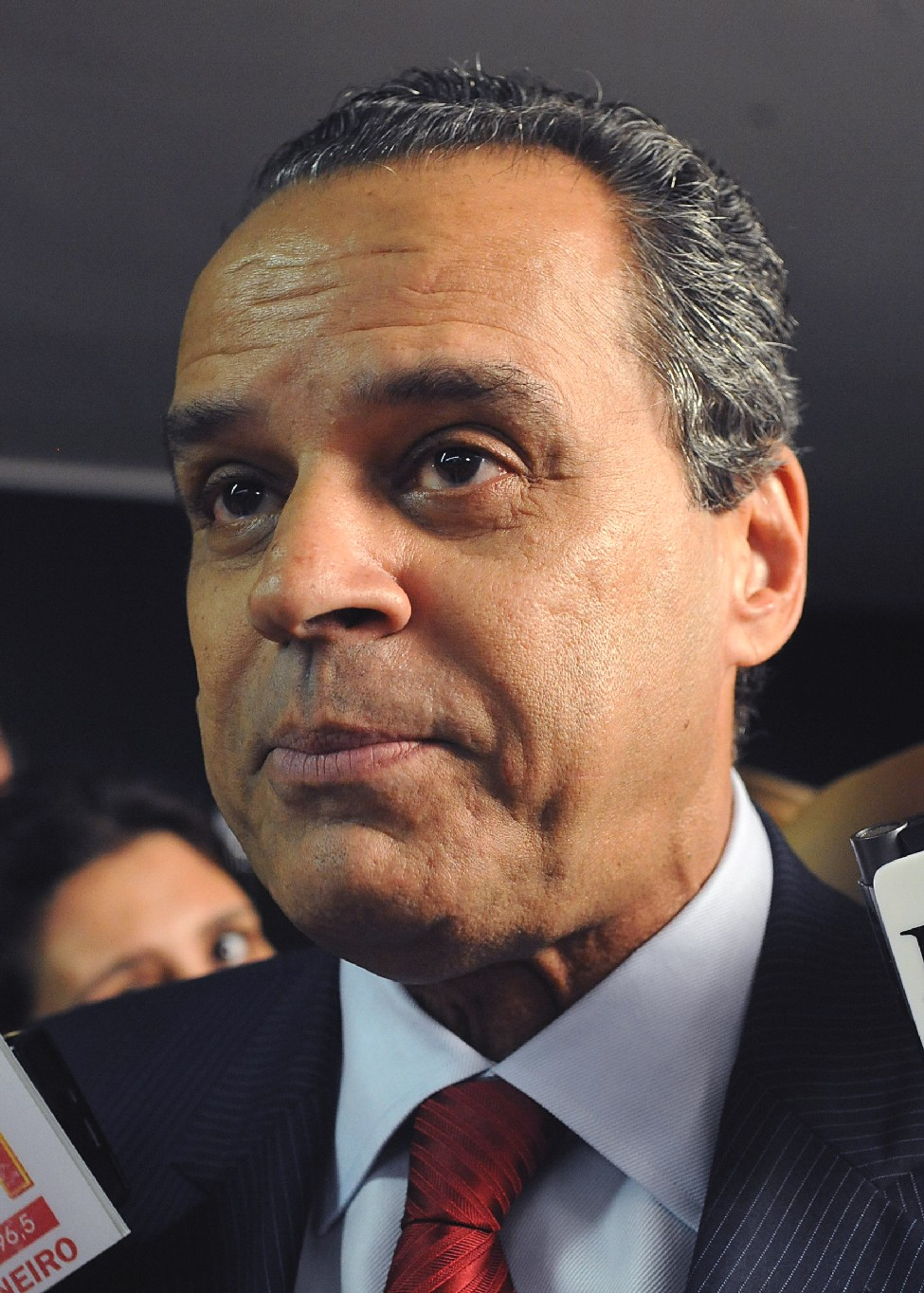

Minister of Tourism
- In office May 12, 2016 – June 16, 2016
- President: Michel Temer
- Preceded by: Alessandro Teixeira
- Succeeded by: Alberto Alves (Acting)
- In office April 16, 2015 – March 28, 2016
- President: Dilma Rousseff
- Preceded by: Vinicius Lages
- Succeeded by: Alberto Alves (Acting)

President of the Chamber of Deputies
- In office February 4, 2013 – February 1, 2015
- Preceded by: Marco Maia
- Succeeded by: Eduardo Cunha

Federal Deputy for Rio Grande do Norte
- In office February 1, 1971 – February 1, 2015

Personal details
- Born: December 9, 1948 (age 76) Rio de Janeiro, RJ, Brazil
- Political party: MDB (1970–1980); PP (People's Party) (1980); PMDB (1980–present)
- Spouse: Laurita Arruda Camara
- Parent: Aluízio Alves (father)
- Relatives: Ana Catarina Alves (sister); Agnelo Alves (uncle); Garibaldi Alves (uncle); Garibaldi Alves Filho (cousin); Carlos Eduardo Alves (cousin); Walter Alves (cousin)
- Occupation: Businessman, politician
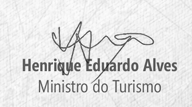
- Signature

Henrique Eduardo Lyra Alves (born December 9, 1948) is a Brazilian politician. A member of the Brazilian Democratic Movement Party, he was the President of the Chamber of Deputies (Speaker) of Brazil from 2013 to 2015. His father was Aluízio Alves.

Political offices
Preceded by Alessandro Teixeira	Minister of Tourism; 2016	Succeeded by Alberto Alves (acting)
Preceded by Vinicius Lages	Minister of Tourism; 2015–2016	Succeeded by Alberto Alves (acting)
Preceded by Marco Maia	President of the Chamber of Deputies; 2013–2015	Succeeded by Eduardo Cunha
