= Nova Palmeira =

- Municipality
- The Municipality of Nova Palmeira
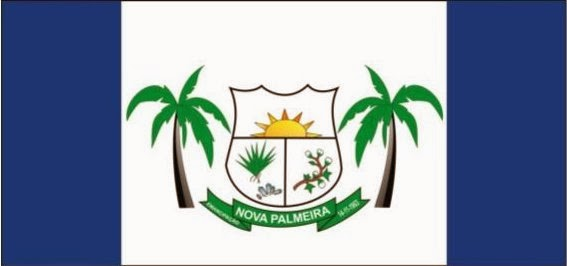
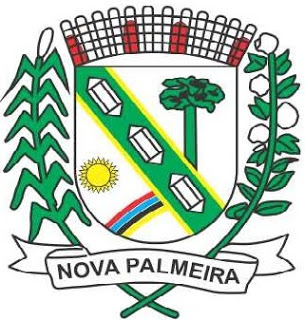
- Flag Coat of arms

- Location of Caiçara in the State of Paraíba
- Coordinates: 06°40′40″S 36°25′15″W
- Country: Brazil
- Region: Northeast
- State: Paraíba
- Founded: November 14, 1963

Government
  - Mayor: José Petronilo de Araújo (PP)

Area
  - Total: 310.348 km^{2} (119.826 sq mi)
- Elevation: 560 m (1,840 ft)

Population (2020)
  - Total: 4,959
  - Density: 15.98/km^{2} (41.38/sq mi)
- Time zone: UTC−3 (BRT)
- HDI (2000): 0.632 – medium

Nova Palmeira is a municipality in the Brazilian state of Paraíba.
