= Micarla de Sousa =

Brazilian journalist and politician

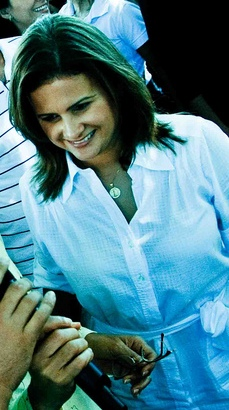
- Micarla de Sousa

Mayor of Natal
- In office January 1, 2009 – October 31, 2012
- Preceded by: Carlos Eduardo Alves
- Succeeded by: Paulinho Freire

Personal details
- Born: Natal
- Party: Green Party

Micarla Araújo de Sousa Weber is a Brazilian journalist, politician and former mayor of Natal. She is Natal's second female mayor.

She is affiliated with the Green Party. She graduated with a degree in journalism from the Federal University of Rio Grande do Norte.

In 2004, she was elected vice mayor of Natal plate by the then mayor, Carlos Eduardo Alves. In 2006, she resigned as vice mayor and applied the member state, the most voted. In 2008, she applied for and was elected mayor. Her term ended in 2012.

Natal was the first Brazilian capital in which the Green Party won a majority election.

== See also ==
- List of mayors of Natal, Rio Grande do Norte
