= Wilma de Faria =

Brazilian politician (1945–2017)

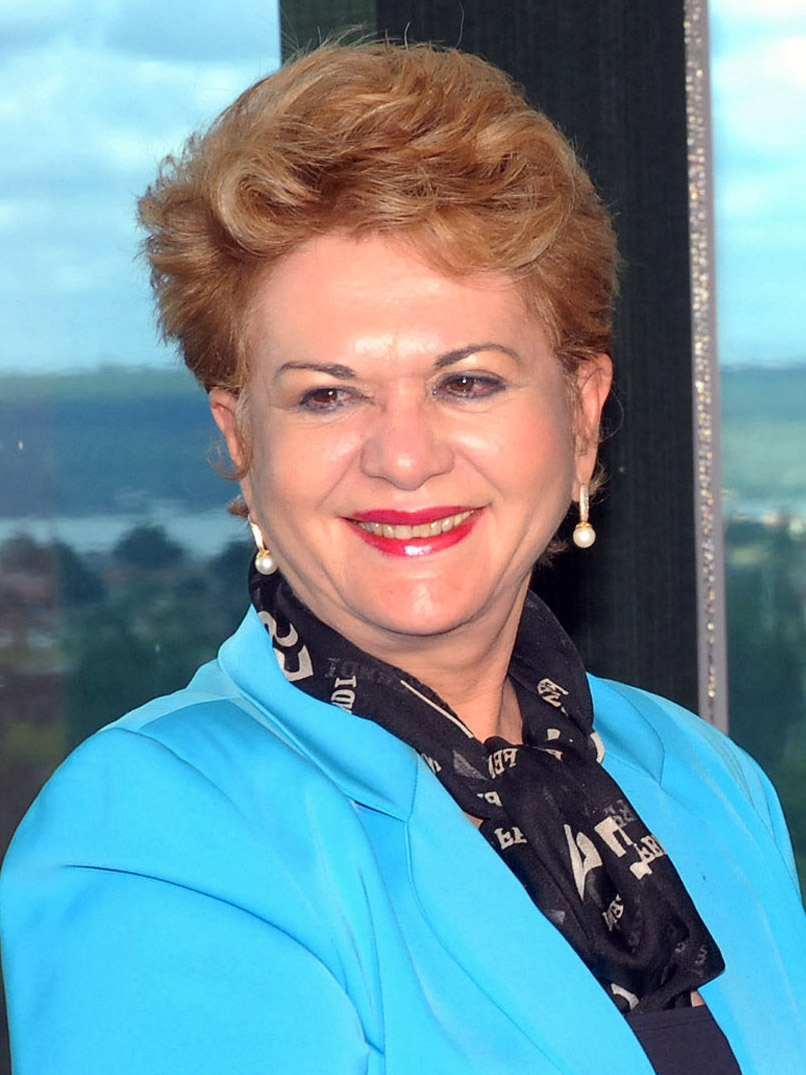
- Wilma de Faria in 2006

Natal City Alderman
- In office 1 January 2017 – 15 June 2017

Vice Mayor of Natal
- In office 1 January 2013 – 1 January 2017
- Preceded by: Paulinho Freire
- Succeeded by: Álvaro Costa Dias

54th Governor of Rio Grande do Norte
- In office 1 January 2003 – 31 March 2010
- Vice Governor: Antônio Jácome (2003-2007); Iberê Ferreira (2007-2010)
- Preceded by: Fernando Freire
- Succeeded by: Iberê Ferreira

38th Mayor of Natal, Rio Grande do Norte
- In office 1 January 1997 – 5 April 2002
- Preceded by: Aldo Tinoco
- Succeeded by: Carlos Eduardo Alves

36th Mayor of Natal, Rio Grande do Norte
- In office 1 January 1989 – 1 January 1993
- Preceded by: Garibaldi Alves Filho
- Succeeded by: Aldo Tinoco

Member of the federal Chamber of Deputies for Rio Grande do Norte
- In office 1986–1988

State Secretary of Labor and Social Well-being of Rio Grande do Norte
- In office 1983–1985

First Lady of Rio Grande do Norte
- In office 15 March 1979 – 14 May 1982
- Governor: Lavoisier Maia
- Preceded by: Teresa Maia
- Succeeded by: Anita Louise Catalão Maia

Personal details
- Born: 17 February 1945 Mossoró, Rio Grande do Norte, Brazil
- Died: 15 June 2017 (aged 72) Natal, Rio Grande do Norte, Brazil
- Party: AVANTE (2016–2017)
- Other party: ARENA (1965–1980); PDS (1980–1988); PDT (1988–1994); PSB (1994–2016); AVANTE (2016–2017)
- Spouse: Lavoisier Maia (m. 1959; div. 1991)
- Profession: Academic

Wilma de Faria (17 February 1945 – 15 June 2017) was a Brazilian politician. She served as the governor of the Brazilian state of Rio Grande do Norte from 2003 to 2010, the first woman to hold the position. She was a member of the AVANTE.

== Death ==
Wilma de Faria died on 15 June 2017, aged 72, at São Lucas Nursing Home, in Natal, due to multiple organ failure. She was also victim of a cancer in the digestive system, diagnosed two years before.

Her corpse was veiled at Our Lady of the Presentation Cathedral and later buried at Morada da Paz Cemetery.

== See also ==
- List of mayors of Natal, Rio Grande do Norte
