= Legislative Assembly of Rio Grande do Norte =

Coordinates: 9°47′5″S 35°12′28″W

Legislative Assembly of Rio Grande do Norte Assembleia Legislativa do Rio Grande do norte
- 60th legislature

Type
- Type: Unicameral

History
- Founded: February 2, 1835

Leadership
- President: Ezequiel Ferreira (pt), PSDB
- First Vice-President: Galeno Torquato (pt), PSD
- First Secretary: George Soares (pt), Liberal

Structure
- Seats: 24 deputies
- Political groups: PSDB (5); PSD (3); Liberal (3); Solidarity (3); PT (2); PSB 40 (2); PROS 90 (1); Forward (1); Social Christian (1); Republicans (1); Democrats (1); MDB (1)

Elections
- Last election: October 7, 2018 (pt)

Meeting place
- Palácio José Augusto, Natal

Website
- www.al.rn.gov.br

The Legislative Assembly of Rio Grande do Norte (Portuguese: Assembleia Legislativa do Rio Grande do Norte) is the unicameral legislature of the State of Rio Grande do Norte in Brazil. It is composed of 24 state deputies who are elected by proportional representation.

The legislature was founded on February 2, 1835. It began its 60th term in 2011. The legislature is currently located in the Plaza September 7 in Cidade Alta, Natal.

== See also ==
- City Council of Natal
