= 2013 in Brazil =

Events from the year 2013 in Brazil.

== Incumbents ==
=== Federal government ===
- President: Dilma Rousseff
- Vice President: Michel Temer
- President of the Chamber of Deputies: Henrique Eduardo Alves
- President of the Senate: Renan Calheiros

=== Governors ===
- Acre: Tião Viana
- Alagoas: Teotônio Vilela Filho
- Amapa: Camilo Capiberibe
- Amazonas: Omar Aziz
- Bahia: Jaques Wagner
- Ceará: Cid Gomes
- Espírito Santo: Renato Casagrande
- Goiás: Marconi Perillo
- Maranhão: Roseana Sarney
- Mato Grosso: Silval da Cunha
- Mato Grosso do Sul: André Puccinelli
- Minas Gerais: Antônio Anastasia
- Pará: Simão Jatene
- Paraíba: Ricardo Coutinho
- Paraná: Beto Richa
- Pernambuco: Eduardo Campos
- Piauí: Wilson Martins
- Rio de Janeiro: Sérgio Cabral Filho
- Rio Grande do Norte: Rosalba Ciarlini Rosado
- Rio Grande do Sul: Tarso Genro
- Rondônia: Confúcio Moura
- Roraima: José de Anchieta Júnior
- Santa Catarina – Raimundo Colombo
- São Paulo: Geraldo Alckmin
- Sergipe:
  - Marcelo Déda (until 2 December)
  - Jackson Barreto (starting 2 December)
- Tocantins: Siqueira Campos

=== Vice governors ===
- Acre: Carlos César Correia de Messias
- Alagoas: José Thomaz da Silva Nonô Neto
- Amapá: Doralice Nascimento de Souza
- Amazonas: José Melo de Oliveira
- Bahia: Otto Alencar
- Ceará: Domingos Gomes de Aguiar Filho
- Espírito Santo: Givaldo Vieira da Silva
- Goiás: José Eliton de Figueiredo Júnior
- Maranhão: Joaquim Washington Luiz de Oliveira
- Mato Grosso: Francisco Tarquínio Daltro
- Mato Grosso do Sul: Simone Tebet
- Minas Gerais: Alberto Pinto Coelho Júnior
- Pará: Helenilson Cunha Pontes
- Paraíba: Rômulo José de Gouveia
- Paraná: Flávio José Arns
- Pernambuco: João Soares Lyra Neto
- Piauí: Wilson Martins
- Rio de Janeiro: Luiz Fernando Pezão
- Rio Grande do Norte: Robinson Faria
- Rio Grande do Sul: Jorge Alberto Duarte Grill
- Rondônia: Airton Pedro Gurgacz
- Roraima: Francisco de Assis Rodrigues
- Santa Catarina: Eduardo Pinho Moreira
- São Paulo: Guilherme Afif Domingos
- Sergipe: Jackson Barreto
- Tocantins: João Oliveira de Sousa

== Events ==
- 2013 protests in Brazil

=== January ===
- January 1: Mayors and councilors, who were elected in the 2012 municipal elections, take office in all Brazilian cities.
- January 27: A nightclub fire in Santa Maria, Rio Grande do Sul kills at least 242 people.

=== March ===
- March 8:
  - Former goalkeeper Bruno Fernandes de Souza is sentenced to 22 years and three months in prison for the death of his ex-girlfriend Eliza Samudio.
  - Journalist Rodrigo Neto was killed by two unidentified men who were suspected militia members.
- March 13: Drug lord Fernandinho Beira-Mar is sentenced in Rio de Janeiro to 80 years in prison for crimes committed in 2002.
- March 14: Ex-boyfriend Mizael Bispo de Souza is sentenced to 20 years in prison for the death of lawyer Mércia Nakashima.
- March 19: The Federal Senate of Brazil unanimously approves the proposal to expand the rights of domestic workers.
- March 29-31: The second Brazilian version of the Lollapalooza music festival is held at the Jockey Club in São Paulo.

=== May ===
- May 4: Nhá Chica becomes the first laywoman and Afro-Brazilian to be declared blessed by the Catholic Church.
- May 7: The president of the Legislative Assembly of Mato Grosso, José Geraldo Riva is removed from office, after being accused of embezzling US$4.7 million.

=== June ===
- June 6: Demonstrations against the increase in public transport fares begin in São Paulo and other cities across the country.
- June 30: Brazil defeats Spain 3-0 at the Maracanã Stadium in Rio de Janeiro, to win their fourth FIFA Confederations Cup trophy.

=== July ===
- July 22: Pope Francis arrives in Brazil, for his first international trip.
- July 23
  - World Youth Day begins in Rio de Janeiro.
  - Snow falls in Curitiba for the first time since 1975.

=== November ===
- November 14: National Institute for Space Research (INPE) satellite data revealed a 30% increase of deforestation in the Amazon in 2013.

== Deaths ==
=== January ===
- January 10: Jorge Selarón, 65, painter and ceramist (Escadaria Selarón).
- January 15: Clayton Silva, 74, actor and comedian (A Praça é Nossa), cancer.
- January 18: Walmor Chagas, 82, actor (Xica da Silva, São Paulo, Sociedade Anônima), apparent suicide by gunshot.
- January 22: Lídia Mattos, 88, actress, pneumonia.
- January 24: Zózimo Bulbul, 75, actor (Quilombo, Sagarana: The Duel) and filmmaker, heart attack.

=== February ===
- February 14: Fernando Lyra, 74, politician, Minister of Justice (1985–1986), cardiopathy.

=== March ===
- March 6: Chorão, 42, musician (Charlie Brown Jr.), cocaine overdose.
- March 20: Emílio Santiago, 66, singer, complications from a stroke.

=== April ===
- April 8: Waldemar Esteves da Cunha, 92, carnival king, respiratory failure and Alzheimer's disease.
- April 15: Cleyde Yáconis, 89, film, stage and television actress, ischemia.
- April 28: Paulo Vanzolini, 89, zoologist, poet and samba composer (Onze sambas e uma capoeira), complications of pneumonia.
- April 30: Tito Buss, 87, Roman Catholic prelate, Bishop of Rio do Sul (1969–2000).

=== May ===
- May 5: Peu Sousa, 35, guitarist (Nove Mil Anjos, Pitty) and record producer, suicide by hanging.
- May 26: Roberto Civita, 76, businessman, CEO of Grupo Abril, heart failure.
- May 28: Silvério Paulo de Albuquerque, 96, Roman Catholic prelate, Bishop of Caetité (1970–1973) and Feira de Santana (1973–1995).

=== June ===
- June 3: Eugênio Izecksohn, 81, herpetologist (Izecksohn's Toad), professor and author.
- June 5: Scarlet Moon de Chevalier, 62, actress, journalist and writer, multiple system atrophy.
- June 7: Malu Rocha, 65, actress, prion.
- June 12:
  - José de Lima, 89, Roman Catholic prelate, Bishop of Itumbiara (1973–1981) and Sete Lagoas (1981–1999).
  - Teodoro Matos Santana, 66, footballer (São Paulo FC), pancreatic cancer.
- June 15: Tatiana Belinky, 94, children's writer
- June 21: Marcelo Grassmann, 88, engraver and draughtsman.
- June 26:
  - Edward Huggins Johnstone, 91, Brazilian-born American judge, member of the US District Court for Western Kentucky (since 1977).
  - Nilton Pacheco, 92, Olympic basketball player (1948).

=== July ===
- July 7: MC Daleste, 20, rapper, shot.
- July 8: Claudiney Ramos, 33, Brazilian-born Equatorial Guinean footballer, malaria.
- July 13: Bertha Becker, 82, geographer.
- July 23:
  - Dominguinhos, 72, composer and singer, infection and cardiac complications.
  - Djalma Santos, 84, footballer, two-time World Cup winner (1958, 1962), complications from pneumonia.

=== August ===
- August 2: Fernando Flávio Marques de Almeida, 97, geologist.
- August 5: Jaime Luiz Coelho, 97, Roman Catholic prelate, Bishop and Archbishop of Maringá (1956–1997).
- August 10: Joaquim Rufino do Rêgo, 87, Roman Catholic prelate, Bishop of Quixadá (1971–1986) and Parnaíba (1986–2001).
- August 13: Rui Moreira Lima, 94, military fighter pilot.
- August 24: Newton de Sordi, 82, World Cup champion footballer (1958), multiple organ dysfunction syndrome.
- August 25: Gylmar dos Santos Neves, 83, World Cup champion footballer (1958, 1962), complications from a heart attack.

=== September ===
- September 1: Joaquim Justino Carreira, 63, Roman Catholic prelate, Bishop of Guarulhos (since 2011).
- September 9: Champignon, 35, musician (Charlie Brown Jr., Revolucionnários, A Banca), suicide.
- September 13: Luiz Gushiken, 63, politician and union leader, member of the Chamber of Deputies (1987–1999); Minister of Communications (2003–2005), cancer.
- September 27: Oscar Castro-Neves, 73, bossa nova musician.

=== October ===
- October 8: José Faria, 80, football coach

=== November ===
- November 6: Jorge Dória, 92, actor and humorist, cardiorespiratory failure.

=== December ===
- December 2: Marcelo Déda, 53, politician, Governor of Sergipe (since 2007)
- December 20: Reginaldo Rossi, 69, singer-songwriter, lung cancer.

== See also ==
- 2013 in Brazilian football
