= 2014 Brazilian gubernatorial elections =

- October 5, 2010 (1st round); October 26, 2010 (2nd round)
- PMDB (7) PT (5) PSDB (4) PSB (3) PDT (2) PSD (2) PCdoB (1) PP (1) PROS (1)

Gubernatorial elections were held in Brazil on 5 October 2014 alongside nationwide general elections, with runoff elections held in several states on 26 October.

== Results ==
The Governors elected in 2014 were the following:

- Acre – Tião Viana from the Workers' Party (re-elected)
- Alagoas – Renan Filho from the Brazilian Democratic Movement Party
- Amapá – Waldez Góes from the Democratic Labour Party
- Amazonas – José Melo from the Republican Party of the Social Order
- Bahia – Rui Costa from the Workers' Party
- Ceará – Camilo Santana from the Workers' Party
- Espírito Santo – Paulo Hartung from the Brazilian Democratic Movement Party
- Federal District – Rodrigo Rollemberg from the Brazilian Socialist Party
- Goiás – Marconi Perillo from the Brazilian Social Democracy Party
- Maranhão – Flávio Dino from the Communist Party of Brazil
- Mato Grosso – Pedro Taques from the Democratic Labour Party
- Mato Grosso do Sul – Reinaldo Azambuja from the Brazilian Social Democracy Party
- Minas Gerais – Fernando Pimentel from the Workers' Party
- Pará – Simão Jatene from the Brazilian Social Democracy Party (re-elected)
- Paraíba – Ricardo Coutinho from the Brazilian Socialist Party (re-elected)
- Paraná – Beto Richa from the Brazilian Social Democracy Party (re-elected)
- Pernambuco – Paulo Câmara from the Brazilian Socialist Party
- Piauí – Wellington Dias from the Workers' Party
- Rio de Janeiro – Luiz Fernando Pezão from the Brazilian Democratic Movement Party
- Rio Grande do Norte – Robinson Faria from the Social Democratic Party
- Rio Grande do Sul – José Ivo Sartori from the Brazilian Democratic Movement Party
- Rondônia – Confúcio Moura from the Brazilian Democratic Movement Party (re-elected)
- Roraima – Suely Campos from the Progressive Party
- Santa Catarina – Raimundo Colombo from the Social Democratic Party (re-elected)
- São Paulo – Geraldo Alckmin from the Brazilian Social Democratic Party (re-elected)
- Sergipe – Jackson Barreto from the Brazilian Democratic Movement Party
- Tocantins – Marcelo Miranda from the Brazilian Democratic Movement Party
