= Mário Ursulino =

Brazilian ophthalmologist

Mário Ursulino Machado Carvalho
- Born: 1959; Aracaju
- Died: 2021 (aged 61–62)
- Education: Federal University of Sergipe (MD); Federal University of Rio de Janeiro (M.Sc)
- Medical career
- Profession: Ophthalmologist; Physician
- Institutions: Hospital de Olhos de Sergipe
- Sub-specialties: Ophthalmology
- Awards: Medalha da Ordem do Mérito Parlamentar em Sergipe

Mário Ursulino Machado Carvalho (born Aracaju) was a Brazilian ophthalmologist.

Ursulino graduated in Doctor of Medicine from the Federal University of Sergipe in 1976–1981, He completed a medical residency in ophthalmology and graduated with a master's degree in ophthalmology from the Federal University of Rio de Janeiro. He founded and was clinical director of Hospital de Olhos de Sergipe.
