= André David (Brazilian politician) =

Brazilian politician and police chief

Delegado André David
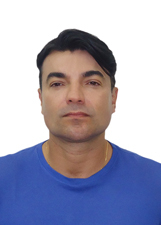

Personal details
- Born: André David Caldas Rosa Rodrigues; 29 September 1973 (age 53) Salvador, Bahia, Brazil
- Party: Republicans
- Occupation: Police chief
- Profession: Police chief

André David Caldas Rosa Rodrigues (born 29 September 1973), known as Delegado André David, is a Brazilian police chief and politician affiliated with the Republicans.

A career police chief with the Civil Police of Sergipe, he has worked in several municipalities in the state and in specialized units, including the Center for Special Police Operations (COPE) and the Department of Narcotics (DENARC). He later served as Municipal Secretary of Social Defense and Citizenship of Aracaju, during the administration of mayor Emília Corrêa.

In 2026, he was officially nominated by the Republicans as a candidate for the Federal Senate representing Sergipe, with Eduardo Amorim as his running mate for the state's two Senate seats.

== Biography ==
André David Caldas Rosa Rodrigues was born in Salvador, Bahia, on 29 September 1973. At a young age, he moved to Sergipe, where he lived in the municipalities of Estância and Aracaju.

According to a biography published by the Republicans, David has worked as a police chief for more than fifteen years and has served in several municipalities in Sergipe, including Monte Alegre de Sergipe, Nossa Senhora da Glória, Lagarto, Propriá, Carira, Itabaiana, and Estância.

During his police career, he also worked at the Center for Special Police Operations (COPE), a specialized unit of the Civil Police of Sergipe.

For his professional activities, he received honorary citizenship titles from municipalities in Sergipe. According to his party biography, he was awarded the titles of honorary citizen of Estância, Aracaju, and Sergipe.

== Police career ==
=== Department of Narcotics ===
André David headed the Department of Narcotics (DENARC), a specialized unit of the Civil Police of Sergipe responsible for investigating and combating drug trafficking.

During his time at the agency, he participated in operations against drug trafficking in Sergipe and other states. In 2021, for example, the Civil Police of Sergipe reported that a DENARC team had taken part in an operation in Rio de Janeiro, resulting in the arrest of a Sergipe-based drug trafficker identified as a member of a criminal organization. David was director of the department at the time.

According to statements made by David himself during the 2026 campaign, his tenure at DENARC was associated with the seizure of approximately four tonnes of drugs. The information was also reported by news outlets based on material from his campaign staff.

At a public hearing held in the Chamber of Deputies in 2023, David described his experience at DENARC and mentioned that one of the goals of his administration had been to capture one of Sergipe's main drug traffickers, who had escaped from prison.

== Political career ==
=== 2022 election ===
In the 2022 general election, André David ran for the Chamber of Deputies as a candidate for the Republicans in Sergipe. He received 31,597 votes.

In the initial vote count, André David was considered elected to one of the eight seats allocated to Sergipe in the Chamber of Deputies. His election, however, was connected to the legal status of the votes received by Eliane Aquino, a candidate for the Workers' Party (PT), whose candidacy had been rejected by the Regional Electoral Court of Sergipe (TRE-SE). Had Aquino's votes remained invalidated, the recalculation of the electoral quotient would have favored the Republicans and secured the seat for André David.

On 4 October 2022, however, Justice Sérgio Banhos of the Superior Electoral Court (TSE) approved Eliane Aquino's candidacy and ordered her 66,072 votes to be counted. The decision changed the composition of Sergipe's delegation in the Chamber of Deputies and effectively removed the seat initially attributed to André David.

The final ruling on Eliane Aquino's candidacy was subsequently concluded by the TSE, which upheld her candidacy. With her votes validated, the Workers' Party obtained the seat that had previously been assigned to André David, while João Daniel remained among the federal deputies elected in Sergipe. André David therefore never took office as a federal deputy.

The episode became a notable feature of André David's electoral career: although his vote total initially placed him among those elected in the 2022 count, a subsequent Electoral Court decision concerning the validity of another candidate's votes changed the calculation of the seats and prevented him from taking office.

== Municipal Secretariat of Social Defense and Citizenship of Aracaju ==
On 2 January 2025, André David was appointed by mayor Emília Corrêa as Municipal Secretary of Social Defense and Citizenship of Aracaju.

In the position, he was responsible for a municipal secretariat dealing with public security and social defense policies. Official documents of the Municipality of Aracaju listed André David as Municipal Secretary of Social Defense and Citizenship during 2025.

He remained in office until stepping down to run in the 2026 elections. In April 2026, the Municipality of Aracaju announced the appointment of Radamés Passos Santos to replace him, explicitly citing André David's departure from the position.

== 2026 Senate candidacy ==
In 2026, André David began campaigning for one of Sergipe's two seats in the Federal Senate. His candidacy was officially approved by the Republicans at a party convention held in Aracaju on 20 July 2026.

The Republicans also officially nominated Eduardo Amorim for the Senate, forming a ticket with two candidates from the same party for the state's two available seats.

During the campaign, David presented public security and combating organized crime as central themes of his political platform.

== Political positions ==
André David's political activity is strongly associated with public security. During the 2026 campaign, he advocated measures to combat organized crime and a tougher policy toward criminal organizations.

His professional experience as a police chief is one of the main elements used in his political communication, and he is frequently presented under the title "Delegado André David".

== Controversies ==
=== Political dispute over public security ===
During the 2026 election campaign, André David became involved in a public dispute with Sergipe's Secretary of Public Security, João Eloy. In June of that year, Eloy criticized David's statements about public security in the state and said that the police chief was using the issue as a political instrument.

The episode occurred amid the electoral dispute and involved public criticism concerning the actions of security forces and the experience of those involved in the field. Eloy also challenged David to a debate on public security.

=== Electoral complaint against radio host ===
In July 2026, the Electoral Court of Sergipe ruled in favor of a complaint filed by the Republicans against radio host Luiz Carlos Focca over a publication concerning André David.

According to a report on the ruling, the radio host had posted a video on Instagram questioning a public contract between the Municipality of Aracaju and a company whose owner was allegedly a relative of André David. The Electoral Court ordered the content to be permanently removed and imposed a fine of R$5,000 for negative premature electoral campaigning.

The ruling did not, in itself, establish any wrongdoing attributable to André David concerning the contract mentioned. The judicial dispute concerned the radio host's publication.

== Electoral history ==
Year	Election	Party	Office	Votes	Result	Refs
2022	General	Republicans	Federal deputy	31,597	Not elected	
2026	General	Republicans	Senator	—N/a	—N/a	—N/a
