= List of mayors of Aracaju =

The following is a list of mayors of the city of Aracaju, in Sergipe state, Brazil.

- Pedro Celestino de Rezende, 1892-1896
- Manuel Antonio Carneiro Leão, 1896-1898
- Jacinto Martins de Almeida Figueiredo, 1898-1900
- Ananias Azevedo, 1900-1902
- Francisco Monteiro de Carvalho Filho, 1902-1904
- Antônio Xavier de Assis, 1904-1906
- Alcino Fernandes de Barros, 1906-1908
- Francino de Andrade Melo, 1908-1910
- Antônio Teixeira Fontes, 1910-1912
- Aristides Napoleão de Carvalho, 1912-1913
- Francisco Antônio da Silva Costa, 1913-1914
- João de Góis Jr, 1914-1915
- Alexandre de Oliveira Freire, 1915-1918
- Jardelino Bittencourt, 1918-1919
- Antonio Batista Bittencourt, 1919-1923
- Adolfo Espinheira Freire de Carvalho, 1923-1925
- Hunald Santaflor Cardoso, 1925-1926
- Amintas José Jorge, 1926-1928
- Teófilo Correia Dantas, 1928-1930
- Marcelino José Jorge, 1930
- Camilo Calazans, 1930-1933
- Francisco de Souza Porto, 1933-1935
- Godofredo Diniz Gonçalves, 1935-1939
- Antonio Cabral, 1939-1941
- Carlos Alberto de Menezes Firpo, 1941-1942
- José Garcez Vieira, 1942-1945
- Mário Diniz Sobral, 1945-1946
- Josaphat Carlos Borges, 1946-1947
- Edgar Barroso, 1947
- Jorge de Oliveira Neto, 1947
- Sérgio Francisco da Silva, 1947
- Marcos Ferreira de Jesus, 1947-1951
- Walter de Assis Ferreira, 1951
- Aldebrando Franco de Menezes, 1951
- Antonio D’Ávila Nabuco, 1951-1952
- Mário Cabral, 1952
- Jorge Maynard, 1952-1955
- José Teixeira Machado, 1955
- Roosevelt Dantas Cardoso de Menezes, 1955-1959
- José Conrado de Araújo, 1959-1962
- José Pereira de Andrade, 1962-1963
- Godofredo Diniz Gonçalves, 1963-1964
- João Alves Bezerra, 1964-1967
- Gileno da Silveira Lima, 1967
- José Teixeira Machado, 1967-1968
- José Aloísio Campos, 1968-1971
- Cleovansóstenes Aguiar, 1971-1975
- João Alves Filho, 1975–1979, 2013-2017
- Heráclito Rollemberg, 1979-1985
- José Carlos Teixeira, 1985
- Jackson Barreto, 1986–1988, 1993-1994
- Viana de Assis, 1988
- Wellington Paixão, 1989-1992
- José Almeida Lima, 1994-1997
- João Augusto Gama, 1997-2000
- Marcelo Déda, 2001-2006
- Edvaldo Nogueira, 2006–2012, 2017-2026
- Emília Corrêa, 2026-present

== See also ==
- Aracaju municipal election, 2016
- Aracaju history (in Portuguese)
- List of mayors of largest cities in Brazil (in Portuguese)
- List of mayors of capitals of Brazil (in Portuguese)
