= Maria do Carmo Alves =

Brazilian politician (1941–2024)

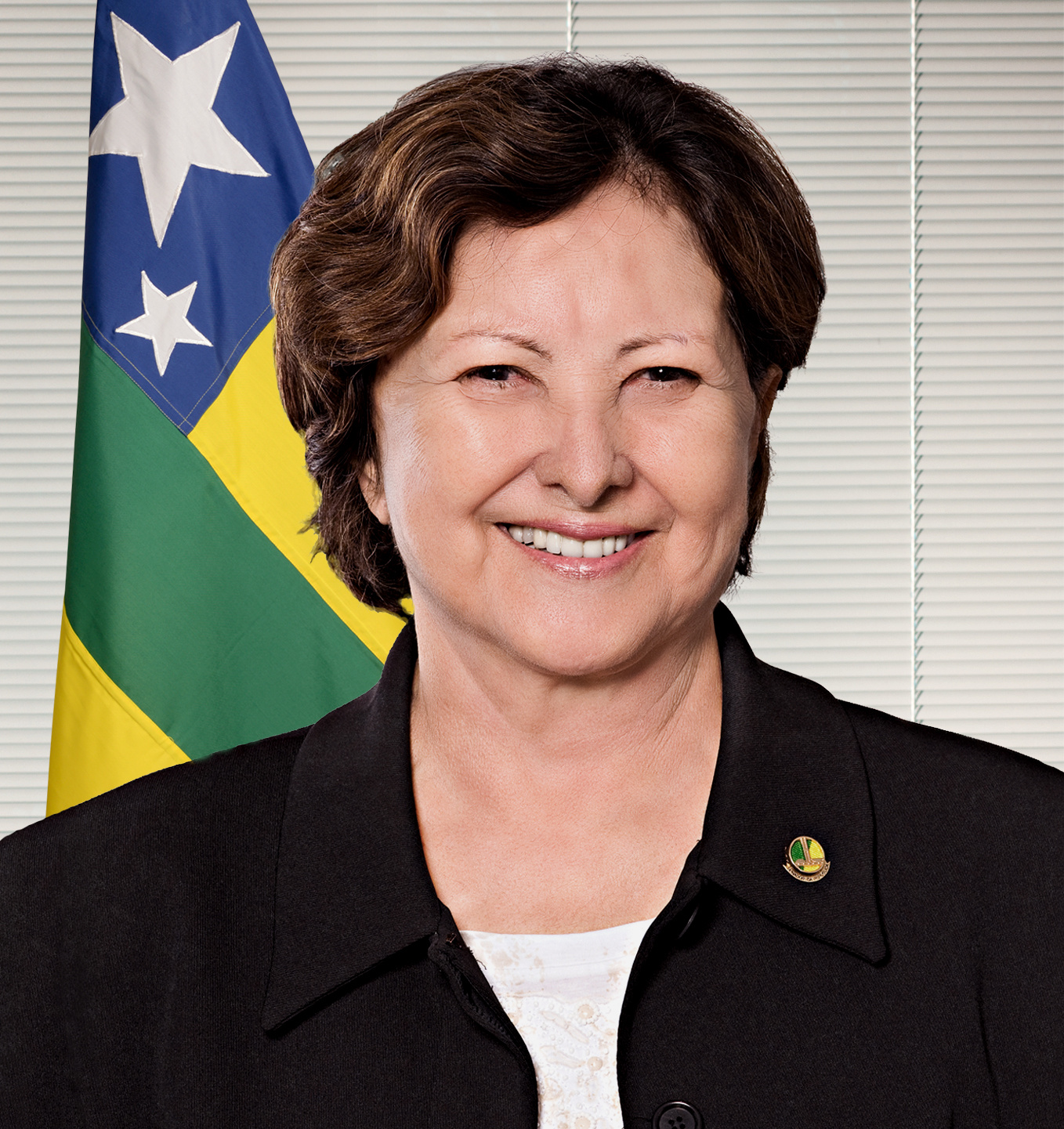
- Official portrait, 2019

Senator for Sergipe
- In office 1 February 1999 – 1 February 2023

First Lady of Sergipe
- In office 15 March 1991 – 1 January 1995
- Governor: João Alves Filho
- Preceded by: Leonor Franco
- Succeeded by: Eliane Aquino
- In office 15 March 1983 – 15 March 1987
- Governor: João Alves Filho
- Preceded by: Ana Luíza Valadares
- Succeeded by: Leonor Franco

Personal details
- Born: Maria do Carmo do Nascimento Alves; 23 August 1941 Cedro de São João, Sergipe, Brazil
- Died: 31 August 2024 (aged 83) Aracaju, Sergipe, Brazil
- Party: PP (2022–2024)
- Other political affiliations: PDS (1980–1985); PFL (1985–2007); DEM (2007–2022); UNIÃO (2022)
- Spouse: João Alves Filho (m. 1966; died 2020)
- Education: Federal University of Sergipe (LL.B.)
- Profession: Businesswoman, lawyer

Maria do Carmo do Nascimento Alves (23 August 1941 – 31 August 2024) was a Brazilian politician. She represented Sergipe in the Federal Senate from 1999 to 2023. She was a member of Progressistas (PP).

She voted in favor of impeaching Dilma Rousseff.

Alves died from pancreatic cancer on 31 August 2024, at the age of 83.

Honorary titles
Preceded by Ana Luíza Valadares	First Lady of Sergipe; 1983–1987	Succeeded by Leonor Franco
Preceded by Leonor Franco	First Lady of Sergipe; 1991–1995	Succeeded by Eliane Aquino
