= Campo do Crioulo =

- Village
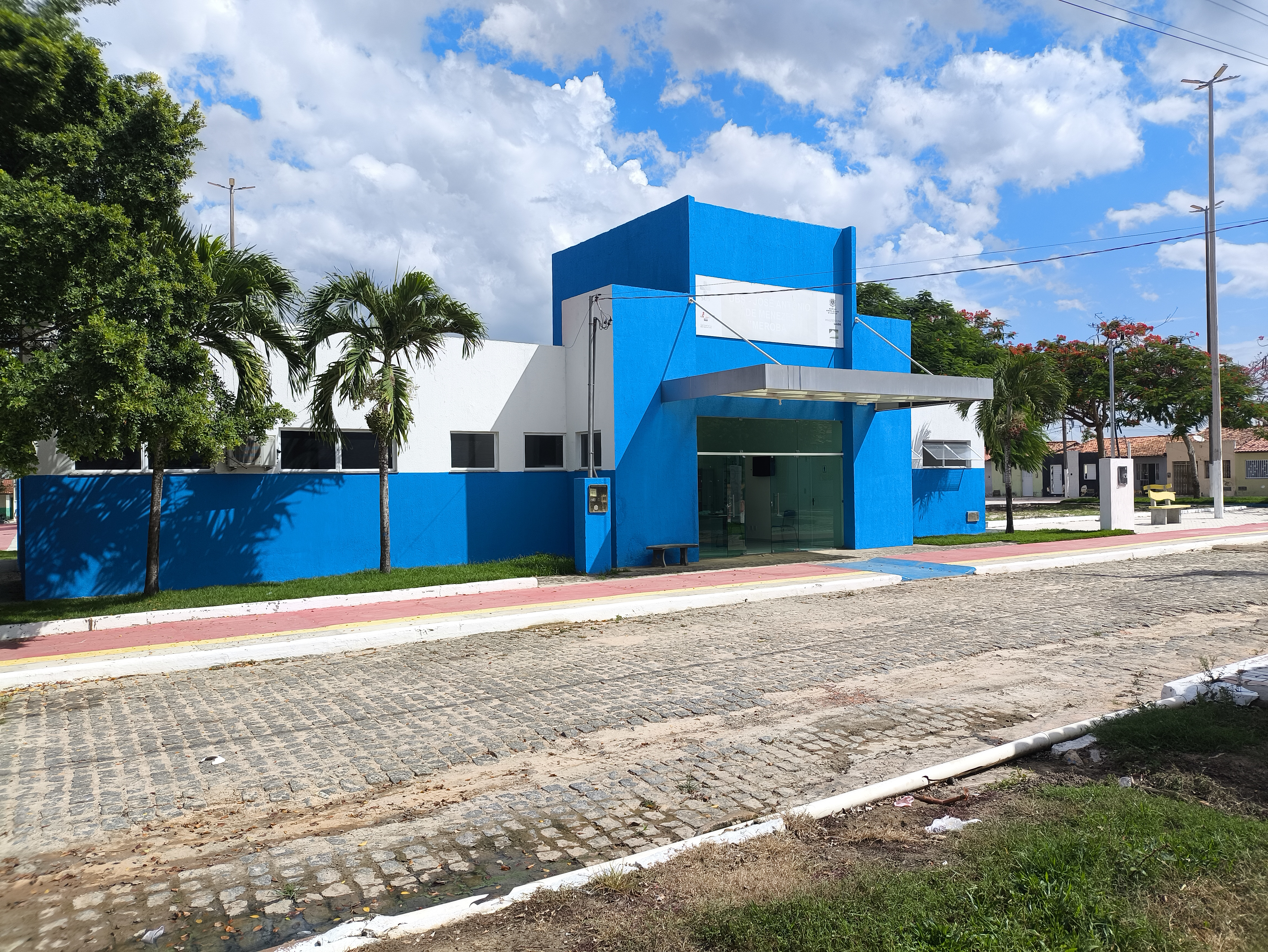
- Building in the main square of the village

- Location of Lagarto in Sergipe

- Location within Brazil
- Coordinates: 10°58′55″S 37°46′12″W
- Country: Brazil
- State: Sergipe
- Municipality: Lagarto
- Elevation: 173 m (568 ft)
- Population (2022): 502

Campo do Crioulo (Brazilian Portuguese pronunciation: [ˈkɐ̃pʊ ˈdʊ kɾiˈolʊ]) is a village and quilombo in the municipality of Lagarto, state of Sergipe, in northeastern Brazil. As of 2022 it had a population of 502. In Portuguese "campo do crioulo" means "creole's field".

== See also ==
- List of villages in Sergipe
