= 2014 Sergipe gubernatorial election =

- October 5, 2014
Nominee	Jackson Barreto (inc.)	Eduardo Amorim	Prof. Sônia Meire
Party	MDB	PSC	PSOL
Running mate	Belivaldo Chagas	Augusto Franco Neto	Roberto Aguiar
Popular vote	537,793	415,641	46,346
Percentage	53.52%	41.37%	4.61%
Governor before election
Jackson Barreto
MDB
Elected Governor
Jackson Barreto
MDB

The Sergipe gubernatorial election was held on 5 October 2014 to elect the next governor of the state of Sergipe. If no candidate had received more than 50% of the vote, a second-round runoff election would have been held on 26 October. Governor Jackson Barreto ran for his first full term after assuming the Governorship in December 2013 and won in the first round.
