= Marina Caskey =

Brazilian immunologist

- Born: 25 May 1974 (age 52); Aracaju, Sergipe, Brazil

Academic background
- Education: Universidade Federal de Sergipe (MD)

Academic work
- Institutions: Rockefeller University

Marina Fernandes De Barros Caskey (born 1978, Aracaju, Sergipe) is a Brazilian Physician-scientist, immunologist and professor at Rockefeller University.

She graduated with a degree in Medicine (MD) from the Federal University of Sergipe. After medical training in Brazil, she did an internal medicine residency at Mount Sinai Morningside (then known at St Luke's), and a fellowship in infectious disease at Cornell's NewYork–Presbyterian Hospital. After her medical training, she did clinical research work on HIV vaccine and vaccine adjuvant development in the lab of Nobel laureate Ralph M. Steinman. Now as a faculty member of Rockefeller, she has led in human clinical trials of neutralizing antibodies against HIV.

== Selected publications ==
- Caskey, Marina (2020). "Broadly Neutralizing Antihuman Immunodeficiency Virus Antibodies in Infants: Promising New Tools for Prevention of Mother-to-Child Transmission?". The Journal of Infectious Diseases. 222 (4): 525–527. Bibcode:1973PNAS...70.2974C. doi:10.1093/infdis/jiz536. PMC 7377284. PMID 31681956.
- Vasan S, Schlesinger SJ, Chen Z, Hurley A, Lombardo A, Than S, Adesanya P, Bunce C, Boaz M, Boyle R, Sayeed E, Clark L, Dugin D, Boente-Carrera M, Schmidt C, Fang Q, LeiBa Huang Y, Zaharatos GJ, Gardiner DF, Caskey M, Seamons L, Ho M, Dally L, Smith C, Cox J, Gill D, Gilmour J, Keefer MC, Fast P, Ho DD (2010). "Phase 1 safety and immunogenicity evaluation of ADMVA, a multigenic, modified vaccinia Ankara-HIV-1 B'/C candidate vaccine". PLOS ONE. 5 (1) e8816. Bibcode:2010PLoSO...5.8816V. doi:10.1371/journal.pone.0008816. PMC 2810329. PMID 20111599.
- Longhi MP, Trumpfheller C, Idoyaga J, Caskey M, Matos I, Kluger C, Salazar AM, Colonna M, Steinman RM (2009). "Dendritic cells require a systemic type I interferon response to mature and induce CD4+ Th1 immunity with poly IC as adjuvant". J Exp Med. 206 (7): 1589–602. doi:10.1084/jem.20090247. PMC 2715098. PMID 19564349.
- Trumpfheller C, Caskey M, Nchinda G, Longhi MP, Mizenina O, Huang Y, Schlesinger SJ, Colonna M, Steinman RM (2008). "The microbial mimic poly IC induces durable and protective CD4+ T cell immunity together with a dendritic cell targeted vaccine". Proc Natl Acad Sci U S A. 105 (7): 2574–9. doi:10.1073/pnas.0711976105. PMC 2268178. PMID 18256187.
- Morgan DJ, Caskey MF, Abbehusen C, Oliveira-Filho J, Araujo C, Porto AF, Santos SB, Orge GO, Joia MJ, Muniz AL, Siqueira I, Glesby MJ, Carvalho E (2007). "Brain magnetic resonance imaging white matter lesions are frequent in HTLV-I carriers and do not discriminate from HAM/TSP". AIDS Res Hum Retroviruses. 23 (12): 1499–504. doi:10.1089/aid.2007.0077. PMC 2593463. PMID 18160007.
- Caskey MF, Morgan DJ, Porto AF, Giozza SP, Muniz AL, Orge GO, Travassos MJ, Barrón Y, Carvalho EM, Glesby MJ (2007). "Clinical manifestations associated with HTLV type I infection: a cross-sectional study". AIDS Res Hum Retroviruses. 23 (3): 365–71. doi:10.1089/aid.2006.0140. PMC 2593454. PMID 17411369.
