= João Daniel (politician) =

Brazilian politician (born 1967)

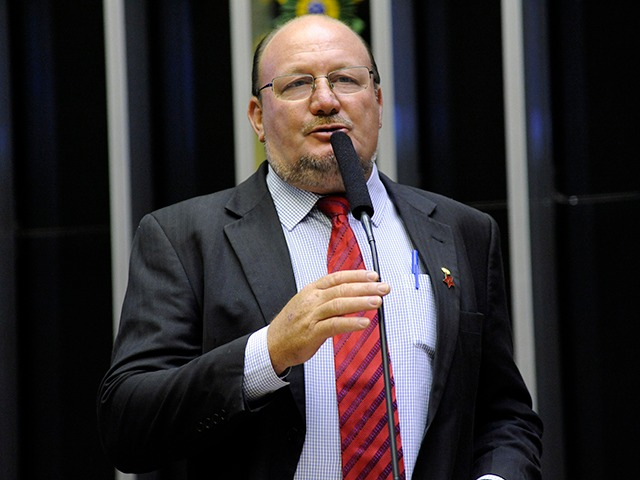
- Daniel in 2019

Member of the Chamber of Deputies
- Incumbent
- Assumed office 1 February 2015
- Constituency: Sergipe

Member of the Legislative Assembly of Sergipe
- In office 1 February 2011 – 1 February 2015
- Constituency: At-large

Personal details
- Born: João Somariva Daniel; 22 August 1967 (age 59) São Lourenço do Oeste, Santa Catarina, Brazil
- Party: PT (since 1994)

João Somariva Daniel (born 22 August 1967) is a Brazilian politician serving as a member of the Chamber of Deputies since 2015. From 2011 to 2015, he was a member of the Legislative Assembly of Sergipe.

In the preliminary election results, João Daniel was initially not included among the eight elected federal deputies from Sergipe, despite receiving 68,969 votes. The final seat was initially awarded to Republican candidate André David, who received 31,597 votes. The result was subsequently challenged after the candidacy of Workers' Party candidate Eliane Aquino was validated by the Superior Electoral Court (TSE). Aquino had received 66,072 votes, but her votes had initially been excluded from the calculation because her candidacy was under judicial review. Following the validation of her candidacy, the Regional Electoral Court of Sergipe (TRE-SE) retotaled the votes on November 18, 2022. The revised calculation awarded the seat to João Daniel, who was confirmed as elected, while André David was removed from the list of elected deputies and became a substitute. Daniel was subsequently elected to the Chamber of Deputies for another term beginning in 2023.
