= André Maurício Conceição de Souza =

Brazilian physicist (born 1976)

- Born: July 22, 1976 (age 50); Aracaju, SergipeBrazil
- Education: Universidade Federal de Sergipe (B.A., Physics., 1997) Centro Brasileiro de Pesquisas Físicas (MA.Ph.D, Physics., 1991)
- Scientific career
- Workplaces: Universidade Federal de Sergipe
- Thesis: Sistemas Estatísticos Complexos e Mecânica Estatística Não Extensiva
- Website: CNPq CV

André Maurício Conceição de Souza Aracaju Sergipe, Is a Brazilian experimental and theoretical physicist with interests in particle physics and general relativity, and a professor of physics at the Federal University of Sergipe.

== Biography ==
Professor André Maurício Conceição de Souza's degree in Bachelor and Bachelor of Physics from the Federal University of Sergipe;Masters and Ph.D. e by the Brazilian Center for Physics Research in Rio de Janeiro; Postdoctoral Fellow at the University of Stuttgart in Germany. Fellow researcher Productivity 1D of CNPq; Associated former researcher at the International Theoretical Physics Institute based in Italy and member of the National Institute of Complex Systems. He was Director of CCET, Research Coordinator and Information Technology of the UFS, as well as Coordinator of Physical Courses. Former member of the Scientific Committee FAPESE and FAPITEC. Advisor Scientific Initiation, Monograph, Master, Doctoral and Postdoctoral Fellow in physics. It has two book chapters in international scientific publishers, 56 articles published in international journal, 1 textbook and dozens of articles published in scientific congresses.
