= Eduardo Amorim =

Eduardo Amorim may refer to:

- Eduardo Amorim (footballer) (born 1950), Brazilian football manager and footballer
- Eduardo Amorim (politician) (born 1963), Brazilian politician

== See also ==
- Eduarda Amorim (born 1986), Brazilian handball player
