= Fábio Reis =

Brazilian politician (born 1977)

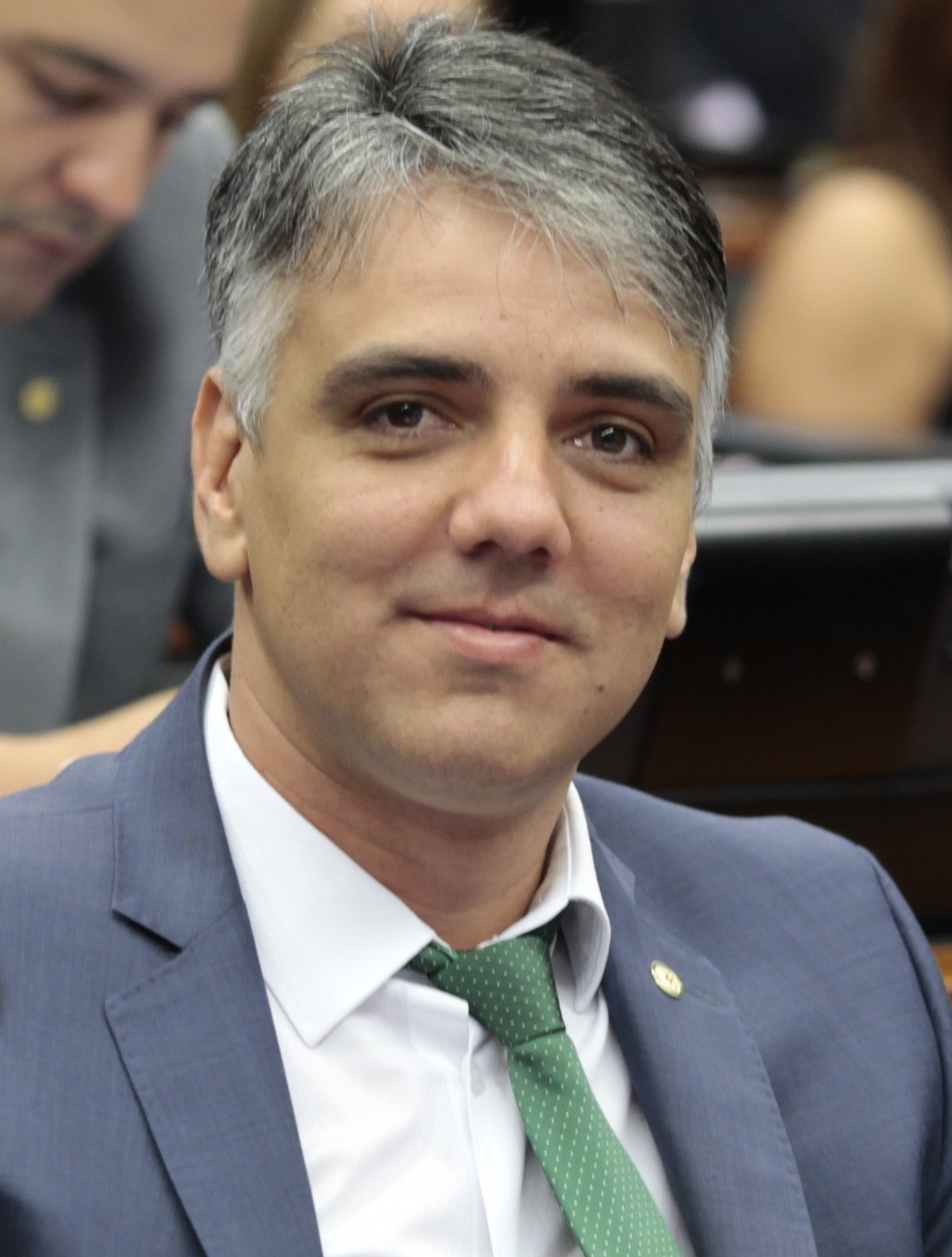
- Reis in 2015

Member of the Chamber of Deputies
- Incumbent
- Assumed office 3 January 2013
- Constituency: Sergipe

Personal details
- Born: Fábio de Almeida Reis; 15 April 1977 (age 49) Lagarto, Sergipe, Brazil
- Party: PSD (since 2022)
- Other political affiliations: MDB (until 2022)

Fábio de Almeida Reis (born 15 April 1977) is a Brazilian politician serving as a member of the Chamber of Deputies since 2013. He is the son of Jerônimo Reis, the brother of Sérgio Reis, the grandson of Artur Reis, and the nephew of Goretti Reis.
