= Déda =

Déda may refer to:

- Déda, Hungarian name of the village of Deda, Romania
- Déda, Brazilian surname
  - Marcelo Déda (1960–2013), Brazilian politician
