= Josué Modesto dos Passos Subrinho =

Brazilian Economist, and Professor

- Born: January 22, 1956; Ribeirópolis, SergipeBrazil
- Education: UFS Universidade Federal de Sergipe (B.Sc); UNICAMP Universidade Estadual de Campinas(MA, PhD)
- Known for: Regional economy
- Scientific career
- Workplaces: UFS Universidade Federal de Sergipe; Universidade Federal da Integração Latino-Americana
- Thesis: Reordenamento do Trabalho. Trabalho Escravo e Trabalho Livre no Nordeste Açucareiro. Sergipe
- Doctoral advisor: Prof. Luiz Felipe de Alencastro Ph.D
- Website: CNPq CV

Josué Modesto dos Passos Subrinho (born 22 January 1956 in Ribeirópolis, Sergipe) is a Brazilian professor of economics at the Federal University of Sergipe. He is currently Rector of the Universidade Federal da Integração Latino-Americana Brazil.

== Biography ==
He graduated with a degree in Economics from the Federal University of Sergipe in (1977). He has a master's degree (1983) and a PhD (1992) in Economics from the Universidade Estadual de Campinas UNICAMP.

He has taught at the Federal University of Sergipe, among other institutions.
