= Emília Corrêa =

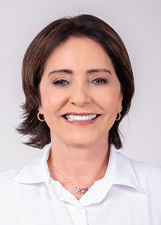

Mayor of Aracaju
- Incumbent
- Assumed office 1 January 2025
- Preceded by: Edvaldo Nogueira

Councilwoman of Aracaju
- In office 1 January 2017 – 1 January 2025

Personal details
- Born: Emília Corrêa Santos Bezerra; 28 July 1962 (age 64) Lagarto, Sergipe, Brazil
- Party: Republicans (2025–present)
- Other political affiliations: See list: PSB (2007–2011); DEM (2011–2015); PSDB (2015–2016); PATRI (2016–2023); PRD (2023–2024); PL (2024–2025)

Emília Corrêa Santos Bezerra (born 28 July 1962) is a Brazilian lawyer and politician who is the current mayor of the city of Aracaju. She is the first woman to become mayor of the state capital. She is a member of the Republicans and is the president of the state branch in the state of Sergipe.
