= Sérgio Reis (politician, born 1974) =

Brazilian politician (born 1974)

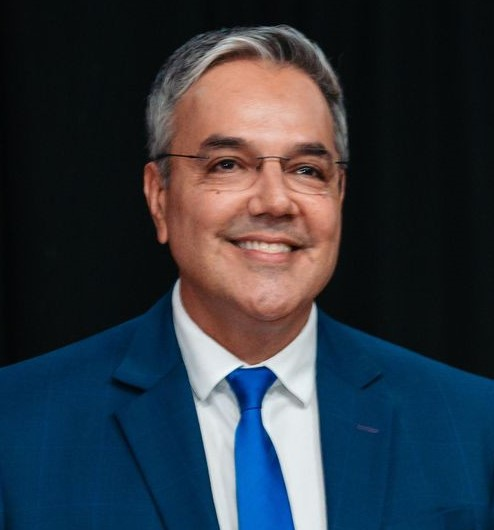
- Reis in 2024

Member of the Chamber of Deputies
- In office 1 February 1999 – 31 January 2003
- Constituency: Sergipe

Personal details
- Born: 18 August 1974 (age 52)
- Party: Social Democratic Party (since 2022)
- Parent: Jerônimo Reis (father)
- Relatives: Fábio Reis (brother); Artur Reis (grandfather); Goretti Reis (aunt)

Artur Sérgio de Almeida Reis (born 18 August 1974) is a Brazilian politician serving as mayor of Lagarto since 2025. From 1999 to 2003, he was a member of the Chamber of Deputies. He is the son of Jerônimo Reis, the brother of Fábio Reis, the grandson of Artur Reis, and the nephew of Goretti Reis.
