= Beatriz Góis Dantas =

Brazilian anthropologist

- Born: 1 December 1941 (age 84)
- Occupations: Academic, writer, professor.

Beatriz Góis Dantas (born 1 December 1941) is a Brazilian anthropologist, folklorist, sociologist, writer, and professor emeritus of Anthropology at the Federal University of Sergipe.

== Bibliography ==
- Nagô Grandma and White Papa: Candomblé and the creation of Afro-Brazilian identity. University of North Carolina Press. 2009. ISBN 978-0-8078-5975-9.
- Rendas e rendeiras no São Francisco: estudos e documentação sobre a renda de bilro de Poço Redondo-SE. Editora Fonte. 2006.
- Renda de Divina Pastora. Vol. 92 de Sala do Artista Popular. 2001. 2001.
