= Edvaldo Nogueira =

Brazilian politician (born 1961)

His Excellency Edvaldo Nogueira Filho
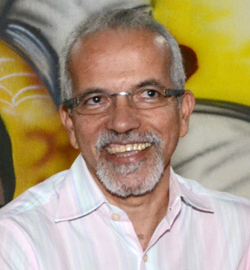

Personal details
- Born: 25 January 1961 Pão de Açúcar (Alagoas)
- Party: Workers' Party
- Education: Universidade Federal de Sergipe MD (Brazil)
- Profession: politician

Edvaldo Nogueira Filho (born 25 August 1961) is a Brazilian politician, He is currently Mayor of Aracaju, capital of Sergipe, a position he previously held between 31 March 2006 and 31 December 2012.
