= Medalha da Ordem do Mérito Parlamentar em Sergipe =

Awarded by the Government of Brazil
- Type: National order
- Eligibility: Brazilian and foreign personalities
- Awarded for: scientific and technical contributions to the cause and development of science in Brazil
- Status: currently awarded
- Grades: Grand Cross (Grã-cruz) GCOMNC; Commander (Comendador) COMNC

Precedence
- Next (higher): National Order of Juridicial Merit

The Medal of the Order of Parliamentary Merit in Sergipe (Portuguese: Medalha da Ordem do Mérito Parlamentar em Sergipe) is the highest distinction of the Legislative Assembly of the Brazilian state of Sergipe, jurídicas It is a medal intended for people or foreigners who, through services, in their spheres, have contributed to the enhancement of the economic, social and cultural development of the State of Sergipe and particularly the Legislative Power or exceptional merit, have become worthy of Special recognition.

== Notable recipients ==
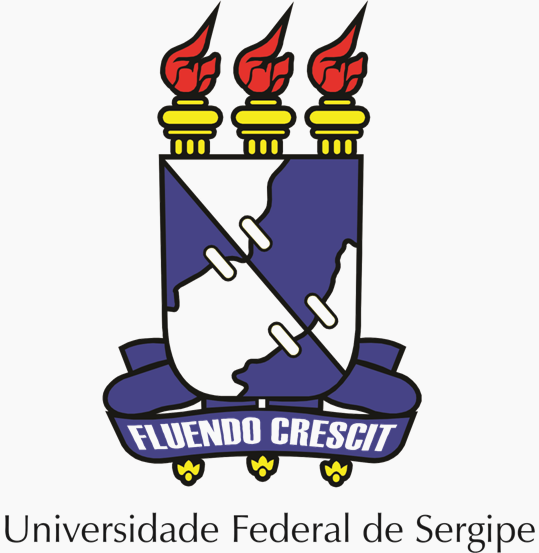
Federal University of Sergipe
