= João Alves Filho =

Brazilian politician and civil engineer (1941–2020)

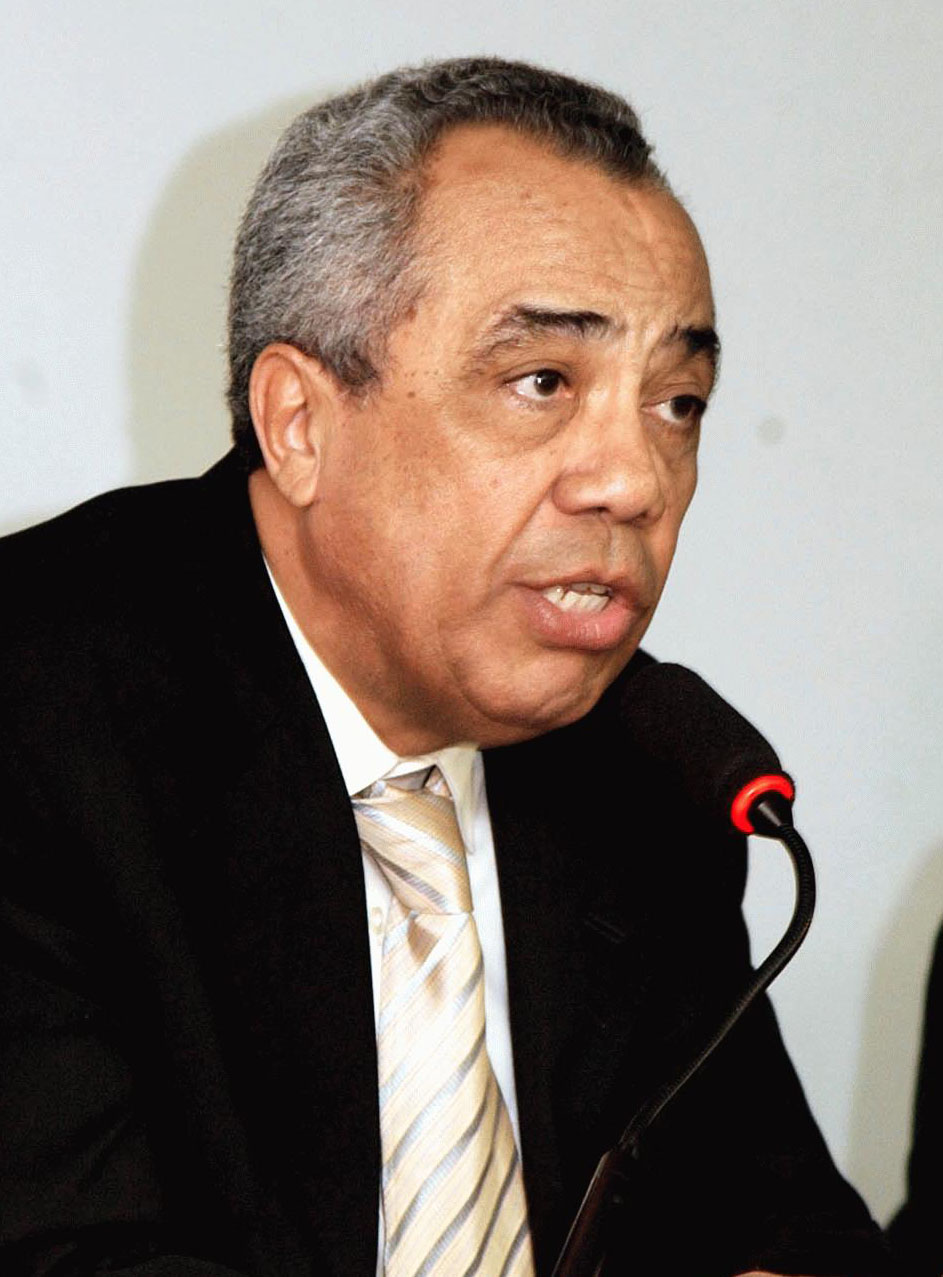
- João Alves Filho

Governor of Sergipe
- In office 1st: 15 March 1983 – 15 March 1987; 2nd: 15 March 1991 – 1 January 1995; 3rd: 1 January 2003 – 1 January 2007

Mayor of Aracaju
- In office 1st:1975 – 1979; 2nd: 1 January 2013 – 1 January 2017

Minister of the Interior of Brazil
- In office 7 August 1987 – 15 March 1990

Personal details
- Born: 3 July 1941; Aracaju, Sergipe, Brazil
- Died: 24 November 2020 (aged 79); Brasília, Federal District, Brazil
- Political party: ARENA (1975–80); PDS (1980–85); PFL (1985–2007); DEM (2007–20)
- Spouse: Maria do Carmo Alves (m. 1966)

João Alves Filho (3 July 1941 – 24 November 2020) was a Brazilian politician and civil engineer.

== Career ==
He served as governor of the state of Sergipe from 1983 to 1987, from 1991 to 1995, and from 2003 to 2007. From 1987 to 1990, he was Brazilian Minister of the Interior.

He was married to senator Maria do Carmo Alves. He was accused of accepting bribes in public works projects, as uncovered in Operação Navalha.

He died on 24 November 2020, aged 79, after being hospitalized at Sírio Libanês Hospital in Brasília due to a cardiac arrest and, posteriorly, diagnosed with COVID-19.

== See also ==
- List of mayors of Aracaju
