= Federal University of Sergipe =

Public university in the state of Sergipe, Brazil

Coordinates: 10.9248113°S 37.1005511°W

- Universidade Federal de Sergipe
- Official Seal
- Other name: UFS
- Motto: Fluendo Crescit
- Motto in English: Flowing Growth
- Type: Public
- Established: 1967
- Budget: US$200 million (2011)
- Rector: André Maurício Conceição de Souza and Silvana Aparecida Bretas
- Faculty: 2,072 non-medical 3,141 total
- Administrative staff: 1,154; 241 temporary
- Students: 30,832
- Undergraduates: 29,481; 1,171 in extension 6,498 long-distance
- Postgraduates: 3,461; 2503 in master 958 in doctorate
- Location: São Cristóvão (headquarters), Aracaju, Itabaiana, Lagarto, Laranjeiras and Estancia, Sergipe, Brazil
- Campus: Urban
- Colors: Blue; White
- Website: UFS.br

The Federal University of Sergipe (Portuguese: Universidade Federal de Sergipe, UFS) is a Brazilian public institution based in Sergipe, with campuses in São Cristóvão, Aracaju, Itabaiana, Laranjeiras, and Lagarto. Founded in 1967 by the junction of the state's existing colleges, it became its second university (the first being the University of Tiradentes, a private institution founded in 1962) and its first public one. It became the state's most reputable and competitive higher education institution, ranking among the country's 40 best universities and Latin America's top 200 list.

== History ==
Following national education reforms, the university became a new, unified campus in São Cristóvão throughout the 1980s. In 1987, the fully transferred UFS inaugurated its new campus, which became the institution's headquarters. During the 1990s, after the creation of 45 new undergraduate courses, there was an emphasis on technology and academic specialization: the Pólo de Novas Tecnologias (Department for New Technologies) and the Programa de Qualificação Docente (Academic Qualification Program; PQD) were formed. During this time, the university started its first master degree programs through the Department of Post-Graduation and Research. Independent scientific thinking was promoted by the Programa de Iniciação Científica (Scientific Initiation Program), a partnership between the UFS and the National Council for Scientific and Technological Development.

Since 2004, the UFS expanded again, based in the government's new social policies, which combine new courses, curricula expansion, reform, and expansion of infrastructure. Though generally praised for its scope, the Expansion Program is criticized for its execution, permeated by bureaucracy and enormous personnel costs, and efficiency. In 2012, the university had a total of 107 courses across six centres.

== Admissions ==
Like most Brazilian universities, admissions to UFS undergraduate courses are made by completing the Vestibular exam. Until 2011, the university independently commissioned the exam from Fundação Carlos Chagas and performed it over four consecutive days: three for each level in Brazilian secondary schools and one for writing.

Like most exams in other public universities (except ITA and IME), the questions do not present a particular level of difficulty; vacancies are the decisive factor for selection, given the process' competitive nature. In 2010, 28,340 students competed for 4,950 vacancies. Unlike admission systems seen in United States, in which the student chooses their line of study usually one year after their matriculation, enrollment to a course happens before the exam, and the student only competes for vacancies in the chosen course. Since 2012, UFS has adopted the Exame Nacional do Ensino Médio (ENEM) as its only form of admission.

In 2007, the university adhered to the controversial racial quota system, designating half of its vacancies to public school black students. The decision was added to the ongoing national controversy questioning the system's constitutionality. In 2012, Brazil's Supreme Court declared the quota system to be legal, and it was passed into law after President Dilma Rousseff's sanction.

=== Primary and secondary education ===
Aside from its higher education curricula, the UFS also ministers primary and secondary education through the Colégio de Applicação (Application School; CODAP), comprising 550 students: 210 primary ("Fundamental Education", levels 6 to 9, according to Brazilian denomination) and 240 secondary ("Mid-Level Education", levels 1 to 3). The school was founded in 1959 as part of the Sergipe College of Philosophy (former Catholic College of Philosophy) and was incorporated into the university in 1968. It was transferred to São Cristóvão Campus in 1981 but remained without a proper building until 1994.

The CODAP is the university's take on non-higher public education, a historically deficient system in Brazil. Aside from the usual curriculum, the school invests in extension programs (gathering 160 students in 2012) and the Projects for Scientific Initiation. Its academic staff comprises 30 permanent and 7 temporary teachers, plus 18 employees in the administrative staff. The school ranks as the State's and one of the country's best public schools: in 2012, it had the country's seventh and the State's best primary public education according to the Índice de Desenvolvimento da Educação Básica (Primary Education Development Index). In 2010 and 2011, the ENEM ranked its secondary education as the state's sixth-best, being the only public school among the top ten.

=== Rankings ===
UFS Law School is recognized as one of the country's best, ranking among the four best results in the Order of Attorneys of Brazil Exam from 2009 to 2012 (first place in 2010 and 2011). In 2012, the Law School received the OAB Quality Seal, given only to those with consistently exceptional performance in the exam.

== Veterinary hospital ==
Sergipe University Veterinary Hospital
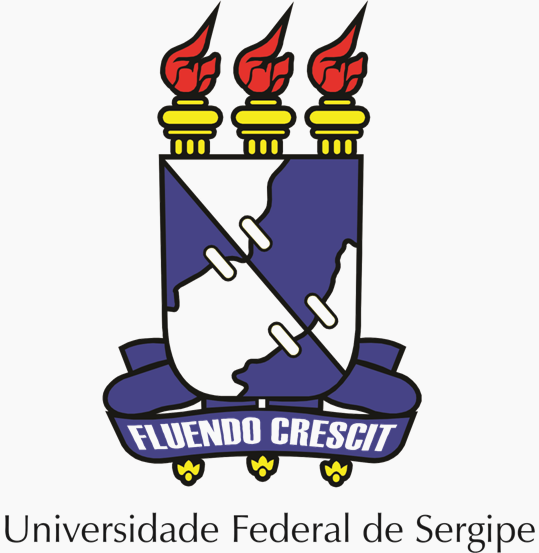

Geography
- Location: São Cristóvão, Northeast Region, Sergipe, Brazil

Organisation
- Type: Teaching
- Affiliated university: Federal University of Sergipe

Services
- Emergency department: 2
- Speciality: General medicine

History
- Constructed: 2015

The Veterinary Hospital of the Federal University of Sergipe (Portuguese: Hospital Veterinário Universitário da Universidade Federal de Sergipe, HVU-UFS) is a Brazilian public university veterinary hospital situated in the Sergipe city of São Cristóvão.

The hospital, founded in 2015, will provide veterinary care, and will have five surgical centers and will offer x-ray, ultrasound, tomography, radiology and electrocardiogram services. It will have hospitalization and rehabilitation rooms, as well as space for practical classes in the Veterinary Medicine course.

== Notable alumni and faculty members ==
- Josué Modesto dos Passos Subrinho
- Otaviano Canuto
- Marina Caskey
- Eduardo Amorim
- Rogério Carvalho Santos
- Marcelo Déda
- Antônio Carlos Valadares
- Carlos Ayres Britto
- Jackson Barreto
- Luciano José Cabral Duarte
- André Maurício Conceição de Souza
- Beatriz Góis Dantas

== See also ==
- List of federal universities of Brazil
