= 2014 Bahia general election =

2014 Bahia gubernatorial election
- October 5, 2014
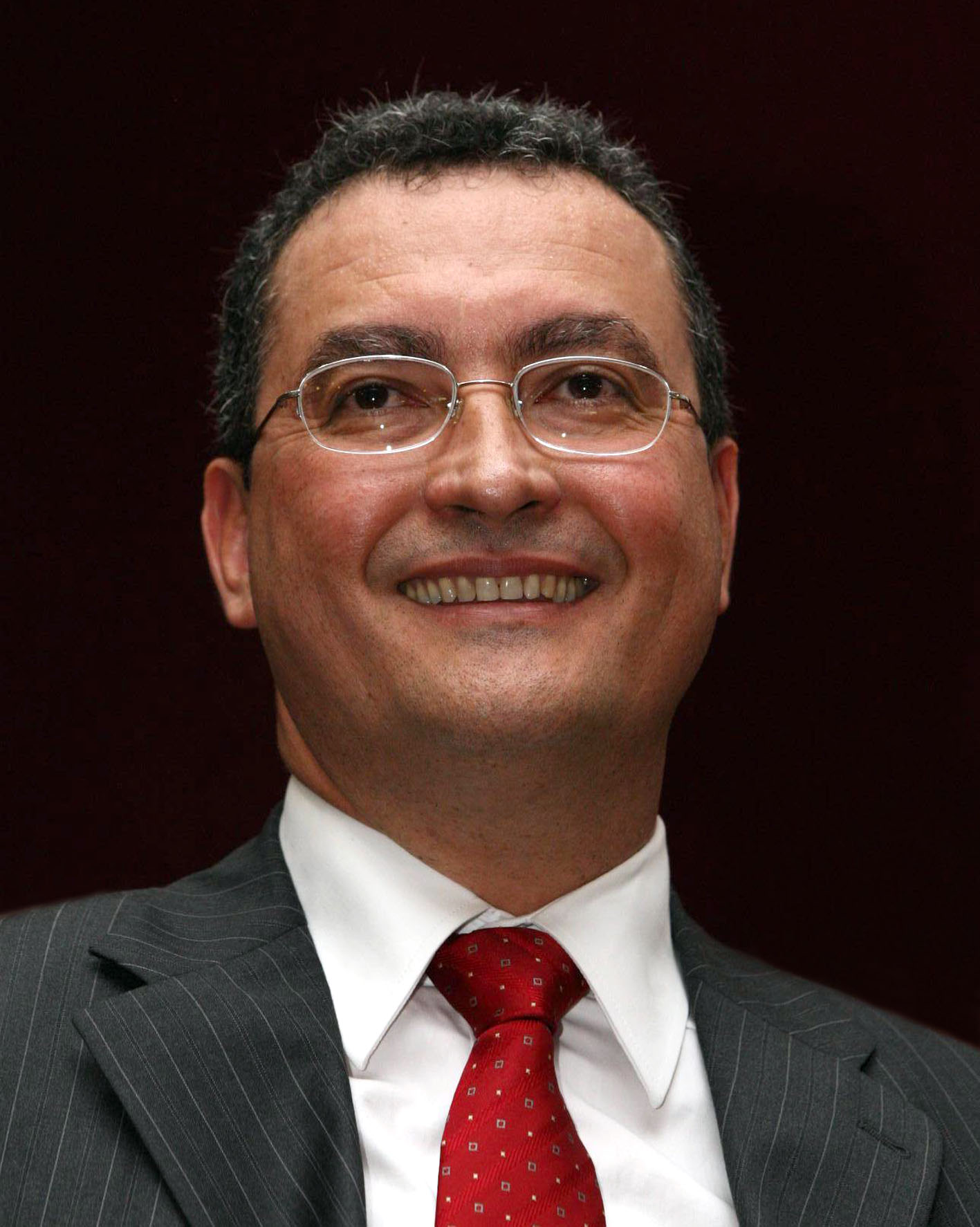

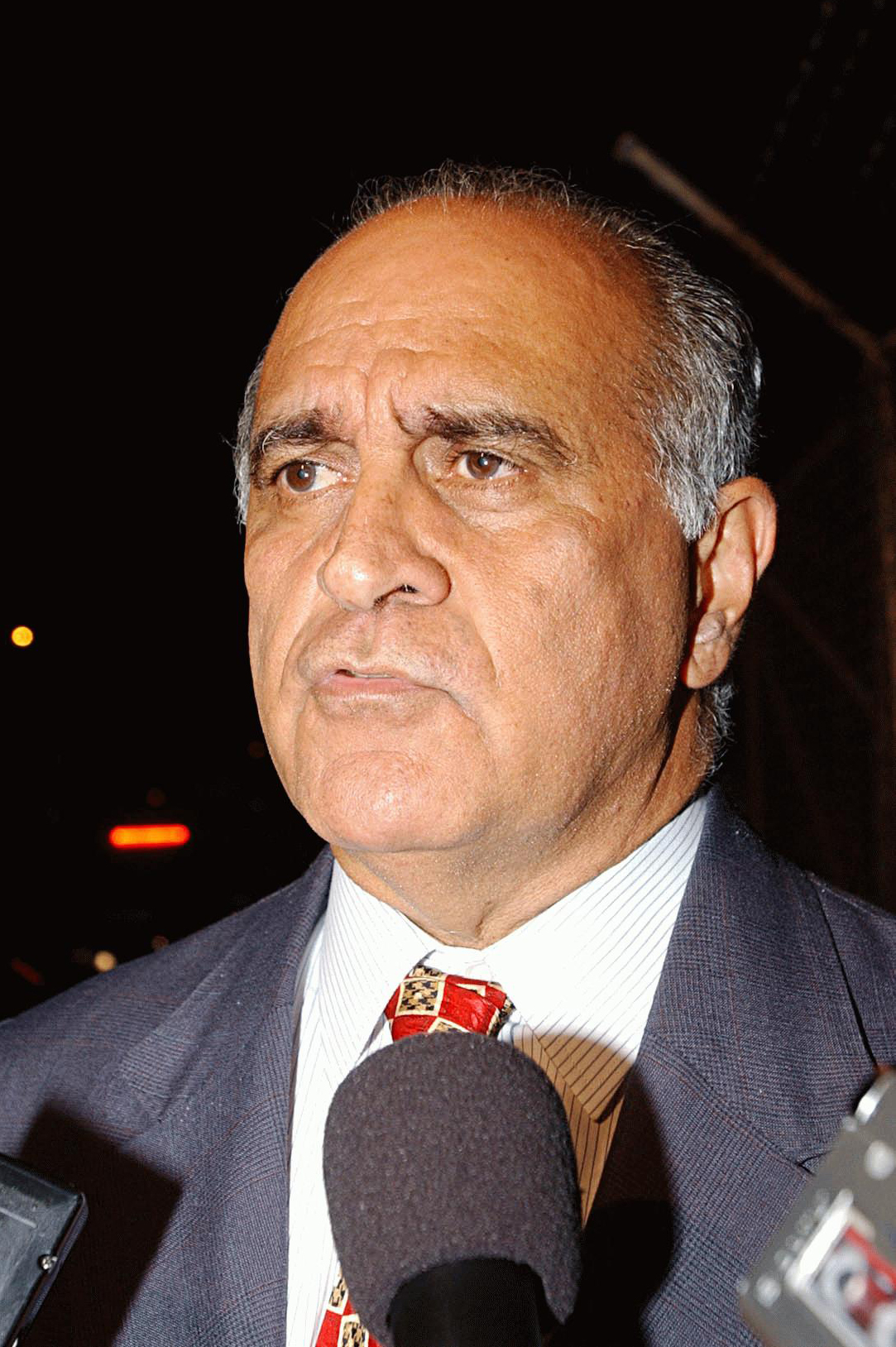

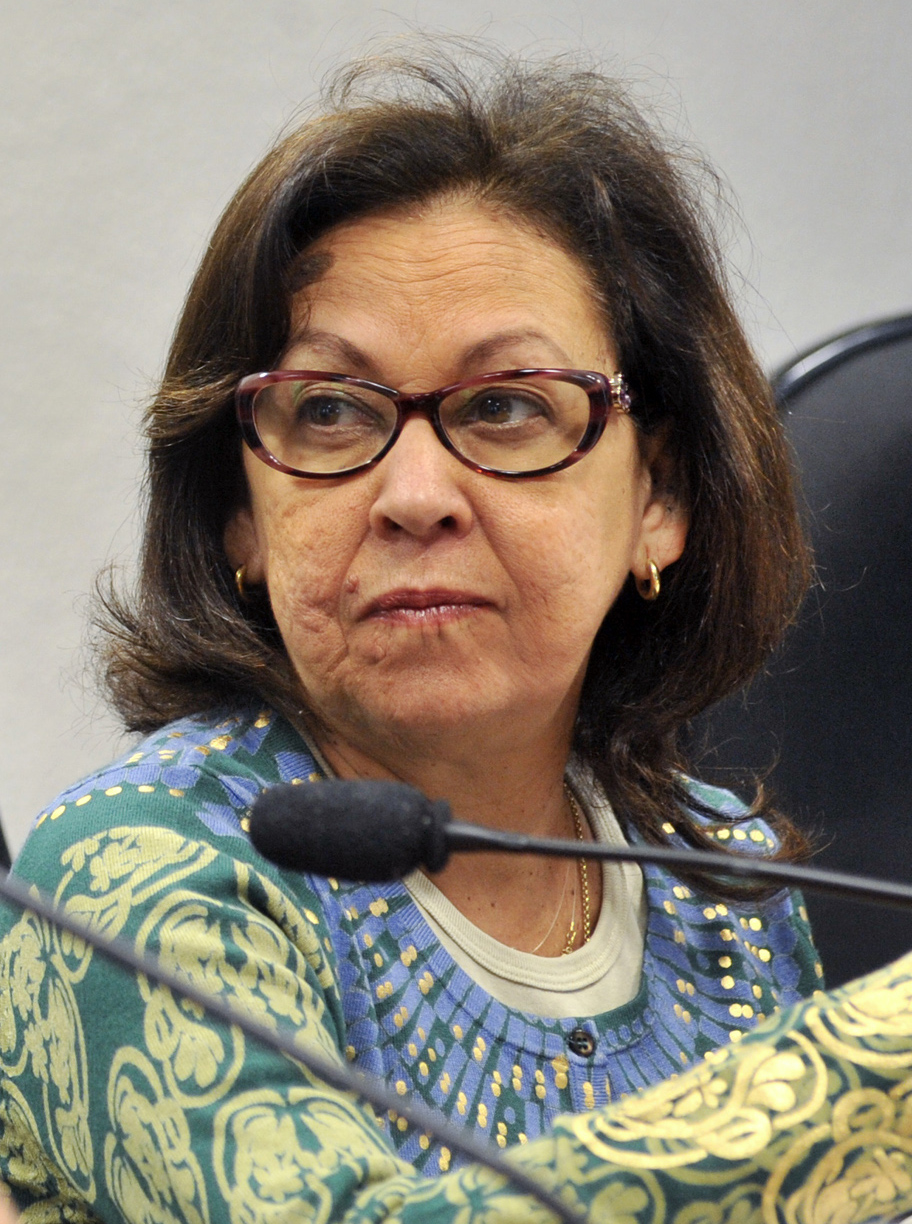
Nominee	Rui Costa	Paulo Souto	Lídice da Mata
Party	PT	DEM	PSB
Running mate	João Leão	Joaci Góes	Eduardo Vasconcelos
Popular vote	3,558,975	2,440,409	432,379
Percentage	54.53%	37.39%	6.62%
Governor before election
Jaques Wagner
PT
Elected Governor
Rui Costa
PT

The Bahia gubernatorial election was held on 5 October 2014 to elect the next governor of the state of Bahia. If no candidate receives more than 50% of the vote, a second-round runoff election will be held on 26 October. Governor Jaques Wagner is ineligible to run due to term limits (eight years). In a stunning upset, the PT nominee Rui Costa won the election with 54.5% of valid votes against 37.3% of Paulo Souto in the first-round.

== Candidates ==
Candidate	Running mate	Coalition
Rui Costa; PT	João Leão; PP	"Pra Bahia Mudar Mais" (PT, PP, PSD, PDT, PR, PCdoB, PTB, PMN)
Renata Mallet; PSTU	Carlos José Bispo do Nascimento; PSTU	-
Paulo Souto; DEM	Joaci Góes; PSDB	"Unidos pela Bahia" (DEM, PSDB, PMDB, SD, PTN, PROS, PRB, PSC, PTC, PV, PPS, PRP, PTdoB, PSDC)
Rogério Tadeu da Luz; PRTB	Antônio Gomes de Andrade Neto; PRTB	"Por uma Bahia Livre e Justa" (PRTB, PEN)
Lídice da Mata; PSB	Eduardo Lima Vasconcelos; PSL	"Um Novo Caminho para a Bahia" (PSB, PSL, PPL)
Marcos Mendes; PSOL	Ronaldo Santos; PSOL	-

== Opinion Polling ==
Date	Institute	Candidate						Blank/Null/Undecided
Date	Institute	Rui Costa (PT)	Paulo Souto (DEM)	Lídice da Mata (PSB)	Rogério da Luz (PRTB)	Marcos Mendes (PSOL)	Renata Mallet (PSTU)	Blank/Null/Undecided
September 29–October 4, 2014	Ibope	36%	36%	4%	1%	1%	1%	22%
September 23–29, 2014	Babesp	34%	35%	6%	-	-	-	25%
September 21–23, 2014	Ibope	27%	43%	7%	-	1%	1%	21%
September 16–21, 2014	Babesp	28%	37%	9%	-	-	-	26%
September 6–9, 2014	Ibope	24%	46%	6%	1%	1%	-	22%
