= Marcelo Grassmann =

Brazilian engraver (1925–2013)

Marcelo Grassmann (September 23, 1925 – June 21, 2013) was a Brazilian engraver and draughtsman.

== Biography ==
Initially interested in sculpture, Grassmann became a wood engraver in the 1940s and in the 1950s became famous as a metal engraver and draughtsman. He won several international first prizes, as in the I Salon of Modern Art of Rio de Janeiro (1953), the III Biennale of São Paulo (1955), the XXXI Biennale of Venice (1958)- prize for sacred art, III Biennale for Graphic Arts - Florence (1972).

Influenced by Austrian artist Alfred Kubin and Brazilian engravers Oswaldo Goeldi and Livio Abramo, Grassmann soon developed his own style of dreamlike figures including knights, maidens, death, horses, crabs and other fantastic creatures. Grassmann has also produced many drawings. His works figure, among others, in the collections of the MoMA in New York, the Bibliothèque Nationale in Paris, the Museum of Fine Arts in Dallas and the Pinacoteca do Estado in São Paulo.
