= Rodrigo Neto =

Brazilian journalist (1975–2013)

- Rodrigo Neto de Faria
- Born: ca. 1975; Brazil
- Died: March 8, 2013; Ipatinga, Minas Gerais, Brazil
- Cause of death: by firearm
- Occupation: Journalist
- Employer(s): Radio Vanguardia & Vale do Aço
- Known for: crime reporting
- Children: 1, a son

Rodrigo Neto (ca. 1975 – 8 March 2013), a Brazilian journalist for Radio Vanguardia and Vale do Aço newspaper in Ipatinga, Minas Gerais, Brazil, was killed by two unidentified men who were suspected militia members.

== Personal life ==
Neto left behind a son, this is the only relative that mentioned. A mass in honor of Neto was held at the Santuário de São Judas Tadeu.

== Career ==
At the time of his death, Neto was working as a host of a local radio show "Plant de Polícia" (Translated: Police Shift) on the station Radio Vanguardia in Ipatinga. The week before his death he had begun working as a reporter for the daily Vale do Aço. Neto also worked as a press aid for the mayor. A friend of Neto's, Fernando Benedito, says that Neto covered stories of police corruption throughout his career.

Neto had recently covered stories that caused him to receive threats. It was mainly when he was covering a case where a police officer was a suspect of being involved in a murder, when he would receive these threats. According to Durval Angelo, a congressman and president of the state assembly's Human rights commission, told media sources that Neto was working on a book about the cases he had covered throughout his career at the time of his death and that the planned title was "The Perfect Crime".

== Death ==
Rodrigo Neto was murdered in Ipatinga, Minas Gerais, Brazil.

Neto was murdered while leaving a community barbecue in Ipatinga, Minas Gerais, Brazil. Two unidentified men on motorcycles shot Neto as he was getting into his car in front of the Churrasquinho do Baiano, a local food stand. Three shots were fired at Neto and he took one to the head and the others to his torso. He was rushed to the hospital where he later died.

=== Investigation ===
Investigators arrested five suspects, who were police officers. These officers were suspected militia group members, who were operating in that area at the time of Neto's death. One of the arrested, was an investigator. Lúcio Lírio Leal, an investigator of the Civil Police, was sentenced to 12 years in prison for qualified homicide.

Lucia Lírio Leal, a former police officer, was sentenced to 12 years in prison for helping plan Neto's murder, in August 2014. Alessandra Neves Augusto, Pitote, was sentenced to 16 years in prison for carrying out the actions that killed Neto. Augusto decided the charges and says that he was framed by the local police. He was also charged with the murder of Carvalho.

At the same time of Neto's death a photojournalist was killed also. Walgney Carvalho was killed on April 14. Walgney Assis Carvalho was killed by Alessandro Neves Augusto because Caravlho had told several people he knew who was responsible for Neto's death. Augusto was falsely passing for a police officer at the time. There is no mention of what the verdict was for the other men arrested.

== Context ==
Neto's colleagues came together to raise awareness of the crime committed onto Neto. They wore black bands on their wrists put on shirts with his name on them, and protested in demand of justice for Neto. A week after the protest, a photojournalist, who may have had knowledge of the crime, was murdered.

== Impact ==
The Committee to Protect Journalists wants the murder of a journalist to be classified as a federal crime, that way cases will be investigated by federal offices, which are better equipped and prepared.

== Reactions ==
When there was no progress in his case for a month, around 1000 demonstrators rallied at the scene of his murder.

Irina Bokova, director-general of UNESCO, said, "I call on the authorities to investigate this crime and bring those responsible to justice. This is an essential step to reinforce public confidence that attacks on journalists will not be tolerated."

The Office of the Special Rapporteur requested that authorities conduct a prompt and diligent investigation to establish the motive of the crime, identify and appropriately punish the perpetrators.

Lúcio Lírio Leal said, "I said that even if I was imprisoned for 200 years, I could say the name of who killed Rodrigo Neto, because I did not know who that person was."

Maria José Braga said, "Impunity is a problem, and even though some have never been resolved, we are seeing advances, I think pressure from other journalists and journalism associations is also important and has made authorities more aware."

CJP spokes person said, "as with the majority of cases ... accountability has extended as far as the gunmen but not the mastermind."

The Committee to Protect Journalists issued a statement: "The murder of Rodrigo Neto has exemplified Brazil's entrenched impunity, and CPJ welcomes every step toward justice in his case."

== See also ==
- Human rights in Brazil
