= Marcelo Déda =

Brazilian politician (1960–2013)

His Excellency Marcelo Déda Chaga
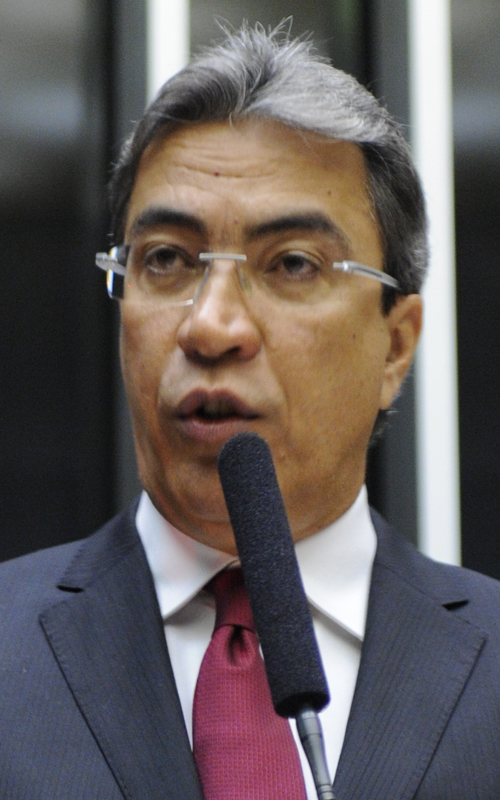

Personal details
- Born: 11 March 1960 Simão Dias, Sergipe
- Died: 2 December 2013 (aged 53) Rio de Janeiro
- Party: Workers' Party
- Education: Universidade Federal de Sergipe BA (Brazil)
- Profession: lawyer politician

Marcelo Déda Chagas (11 March 1960 – 2 December 2013) was a Brazilian politician. He was the mayor of Aracaju from 2000 to 2006, and was elected in 2006 and 2010 as Governor of Sergipe.

Déda was born in Simão Dias. His political career began during the Secondarist Movement (Movemento Secundarista). His first contact with the DCE was at the Federal University of Sergipe, during the lifetime of the student leftist political group in the university called "Action".

In 1982, in the first election of the Worker's Party (Partido do Trabalhador), Déda was nominated as a candidate for state representative. He was 22 years old, and he obtained almost 300 votes. In 1985, he was active during the elections for mayor in Aracaju and the present governor candidate. The campaign took off, and Marcelo Déda achieved second place at the ballot box, with approximately 19,000 votes.

He was chosen as a state representative in 1986, with the biggest voting of its legislature. His more than thirty thousand votes were so significant, that elected, also, was another partisan, Marcelo Ribeiro, who had little more than 1,000 votes.

It was disputed, in 1990, for the re-election for the assembly, but was defeated obtaining little more of 10% of the previous voting. Four years afterwards, in 1994, he ran for the Federal Chamber, being chosen federal representative, with the biggest voting of the state.

He represented Sergipe, arriving to the leadership of the Party of the Workers. In the sequence, in 1998, he was re-elected as a federal delegate, but resigned to assume the city hall of the Sergipe capital.

== Mayor of Aracaju ==
On 26 May 2000, Marcelo Déda became a candidate for mayor of Aracaju, being one of the last put in the polls. During the three months of the campaign, Déda began to jump in the polls, winning the election still in the first round, with 52.80% of the valid votes, beside the then vice-mayor Edvaldo Nogueira.

In 2004, Déda was reelected as mayor of Aracaju, with 71.38% of the valid votes.

== Governor of Sergipe ==
On 31 March 2006, Déda resigned as mayor of Aracaju to face the competition for governor of Sergipe. In historic victory, which symbolized a change in the political landscape of Sergipe, Marcelo Déda was elected governor, with 52.48% of the vote, next to the vice-governor Belivaldo Chagas also simãodiense. Déda was named governor, although João Alves Filho had won in the first round.

In 2010, Déda defeated João Alves Filho again in the first round, though in a disputed election: Marcelo Déda got 52% of the votes in re-election on October 3, along with Vice Jackson Barreto, who with the same name involved in some scandals, did not take the advantage in the very first voting intention polls.

The Electoral Prosecutor (Ministério Público) in December 2011 called for his impeachment for abuse of power.

On 2 December 2013, Déda passed away from cancer in a hospital in Sao Paulo.

== Impact ==
The political career of Marcelo Déda is marked as points his candidacy for mayor of Aracaju in 1985. At the time, still in his twenties, he challenged the policy of Sergipe strong names such as Baker and Jackson Gilton Garcia. He took second place, but is accredited to dispute a place in the state legislature shortly thereafter.

In the city of Aracaju, revitalized throughout the city, he built and renovated many health agencies, created two new hospitals, built several new avenues, the neighborhood Santa Maria (formerly Terra Dura) and planned the construction of the new bridge the day, a great work integration of several neighborhoods in Aracaju, and transformed the Cashew Forro in June festivities, as one of the largest in the country. During his administration, Aracaju, the capital was considered the best quality of life of the country, surpassing even Curitiba, which had until then, the title of best city in Brazil with Brasília.

In the Government of Sergipe, he developed important projects for the state, including the construction of two new regional hospitals and about 12 other municipal hospitals, in order to relieve the dire care Huse (Emergency Hospital of Sergipe). He succeeded recently with the Federal Government, the order of implementation of a campus health UFS in Lagarto, unprecedented since the medical school is only available throughout the state, the UFS of St. Christopher. The annual June festivities of Sergipe, that have become tradition, are one of the largest in the country.

Allied to Mr Baker and the Senator Jackson Valadares (PSB), countryman and friend, Marcelo Déda supported the reelection of the successor in the Municipality of Aracaju, Edvaldo Nogueira (PC do B), and emerged victorious in the election during the first round, choosing also more than 60 mayors of the 75 possible throughout the state.

== See also ==
- List of mayors of Aracaju
