= Jackson Barreto =

Brazilian politician

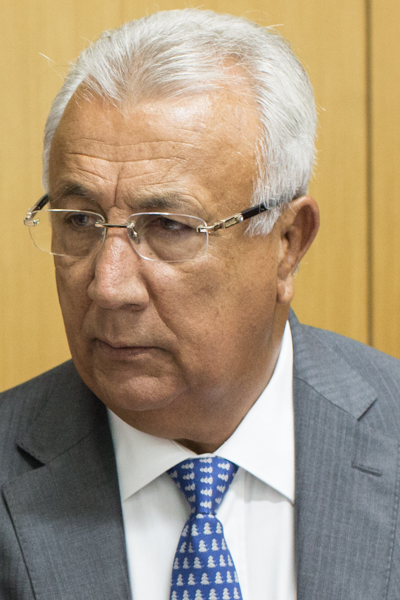
- Barreto in 2017

Governor of Sergipe
- In office December 2, 2013 – April 6, 2018
- Vice Governor: Vacant (2013–2015); Livaldo Chagas Silva (since 2015)
- Preceded by: Marcelo Déda
- Succeeded by: Belivaldo Chagas

Vice Governor of Sergipe
- In office January 1, 2011 – December 2, 2013
- Governor: Marcelo Déda
- Preceded by: Belivaldo Chagas
- Succeeded by: Livaldo Chagas Silva

Federal Deputy of Sergipe
- In office February 1, 2003 – February 1, 2011

Federal Deputy of Sergipe
- In office 1979–1983

Personal details
- Born: 6 May 1944 Santa Rosa de Lima, Sergipe, Brazil
- Party: PMDB

Jackson Barreto de Lima (born May 6, 1944) is a Brazilian lawyer, politician, and member of the PMDB. Barreto has served as the governor of Sergipe since December 2, 2013, following the death of his predecessor, Governor Marcelo Déda, who died in office.

He served as a Sergipe state deputy from 1975 to 1978. Barreto also served as the mayor of Aracaju, the state's largest city, from 1986 to 1988 and again from 1993 to 1994.

Barreto won re-election for a full term as governor in the Sergipe gubernatorial election on October 5, 2014. Governor Barreto received 53.51% of the vote, while his closest opponent, Eduardo Amorim of the PSC, placed second with 41.33% of the vote.

== See also ==
- List of mayors of Aracaju

Political offices
Preceded by Marcelo Déda	Governor of Sergipe; 2013 – Present	Incumbent
