= Nilton Pacheco =

Brazilian basketball player

Personal information
- Born: 26 July 1920 Salvador, Bahia, Brazil
- Died: 26 June 2013 (aged 92) Rio de Janeiro, Brazil
Medals
Men's basketball
Representing Brazil
Olympic Games
| Bronze medal – third place | 1948 London | Team |

Nilton Pacheco de Oliveira (26 July 1920 – 26 June 2013), commonly known as Nilton Pacheco, was a Brazilian basketball player who competed in the 1948 Summer Olympics in London, United Kingdom. There he won the bronze medal with the men's national basketball team under the guidance of head coach Moacyr Daiuto. He was born in Salvador, Bahia.
