= 2014 Santa Catarina gubernatorial election =

- October 5, 2014
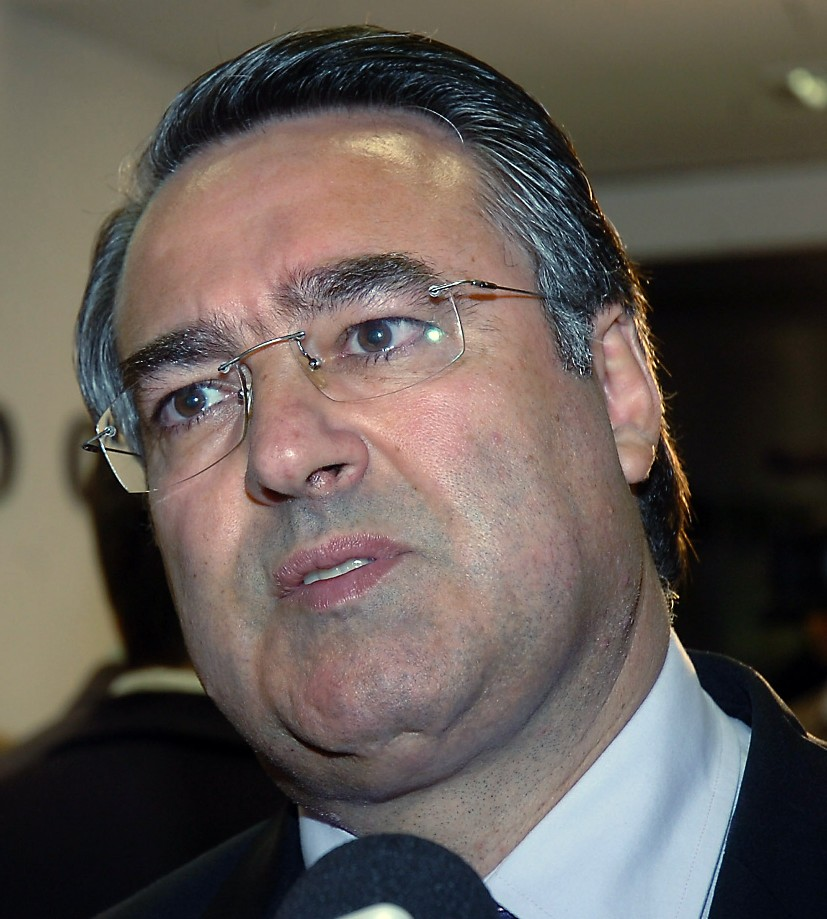

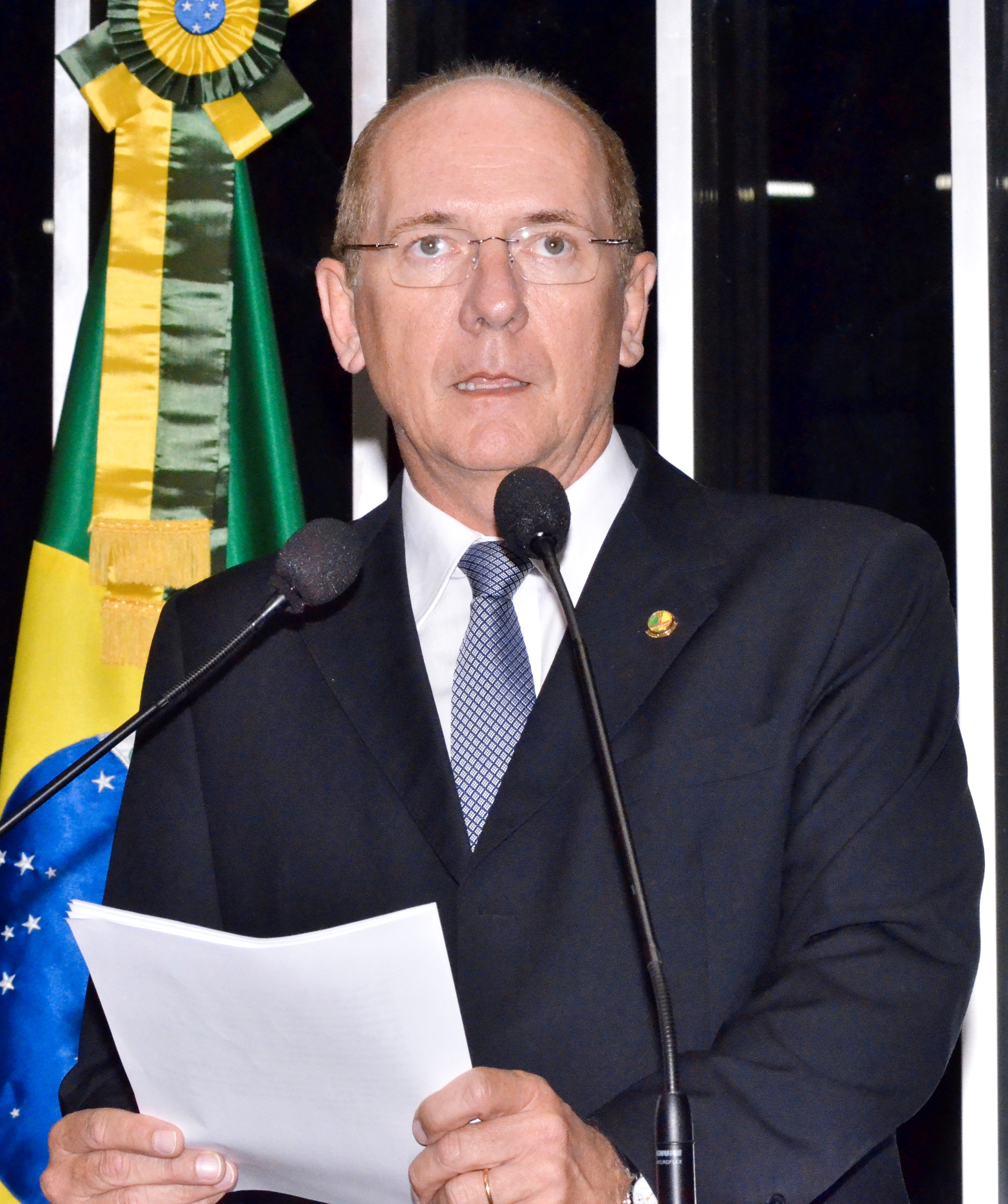

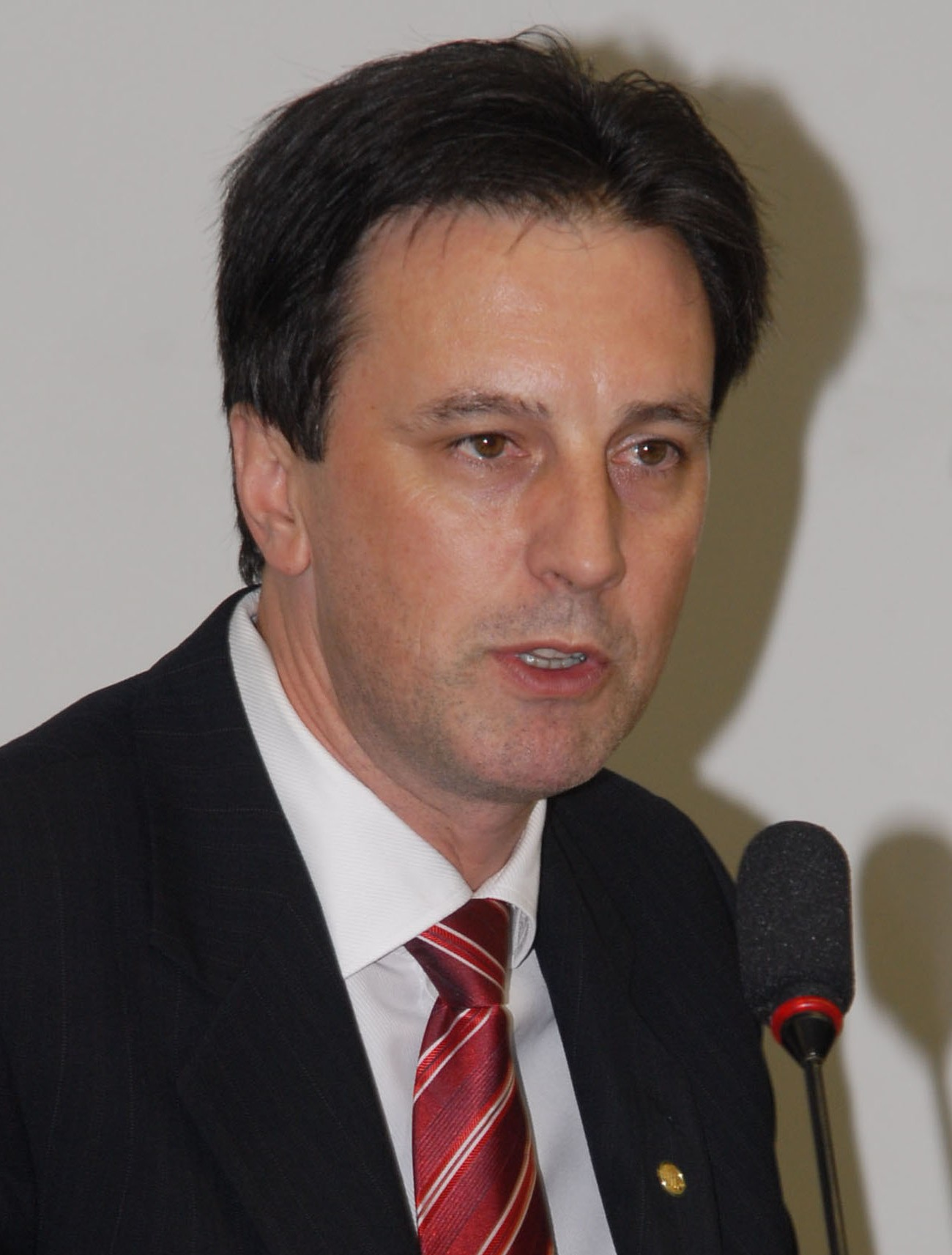
Nominee	Raimundo Colombo	Paulo Bauer	Cláudio Vignatti
Party	PSD	PSDB	PT
Running mate	Eduardo Pinho Moreira	Joares Ponticelli	Henrique Afonso
Governor before election
Raimundo Colombo
PSD
Elected Governor
TBD

The Santa Catarina gubernatorial election was held on 5 October 2014 to elect the next governor of the state of Santa Catarina. Governor Raimundo Colombo was re-elected to a second term.
