= Lagarto, Sergipe =

Municipality in Sergipe, Brazil

Lagarto
- City
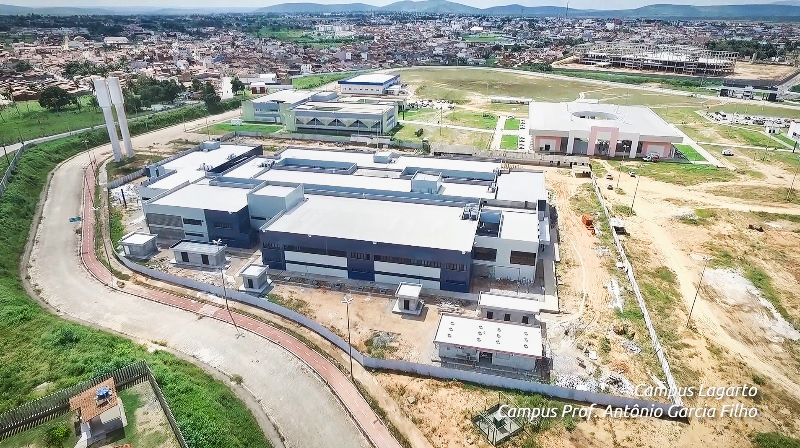
- Partial view of Lagarto

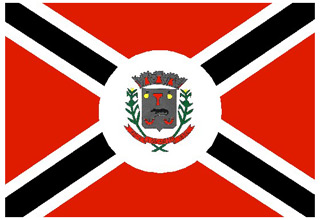
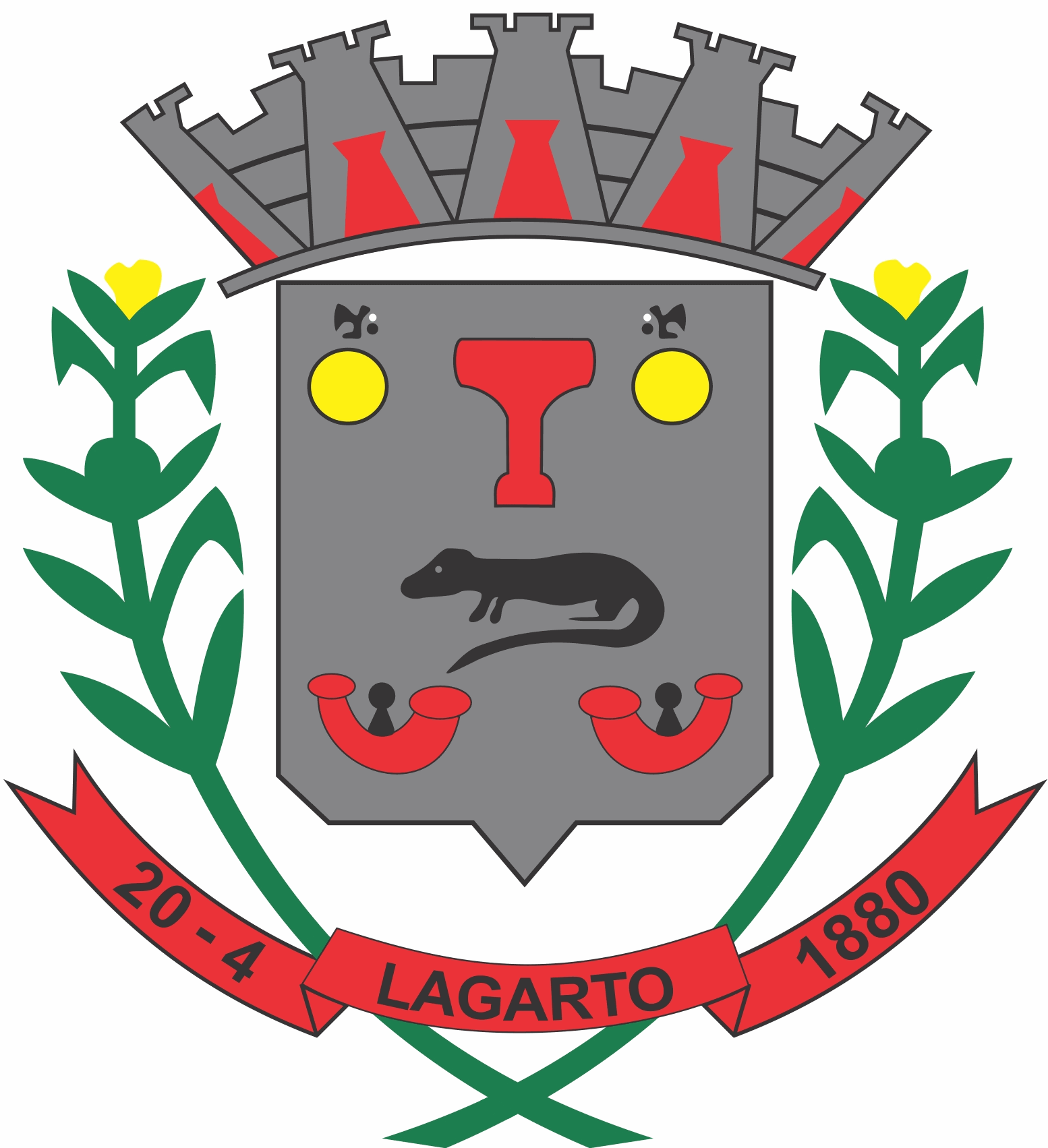
- Flag Coat of arms
- Nickname: Tenderness city

- Location in Brazil
- Coordinates: 10°55′01″S 37°39′00″W
- Country: Brazil
- Region: Northeast
- State: Sergipe
- Mesoregion: Agreste Sergipano
- Microregion: Agreste de Lagarto
- Settled: 1689

Government
  - Mayor: Sérgio Reis

Area
  - Total: 374 sq mi (969 km^{2})
- Elevation: 600 ft (183 m)

Population (2022 Census)
  - Total: 101,579
  - Estimate (2025): 105,957
- Time zone: UTC−3 (BRT)
- HDI (2010): 0.625
- Website: Official Website

Lagarto (Brazilian Portuguese pronunciation: [laˈɡaʁtu]) is a Brazilian municipality located in the center-south region of the state of Sergipe. It has an estimated population of 101,579 according to the 2022 Census conducted by the Brazilian Institute of Geography and Statistics (IBGE).
