= Eduardo Amorim (politician) =

Brazilian politician

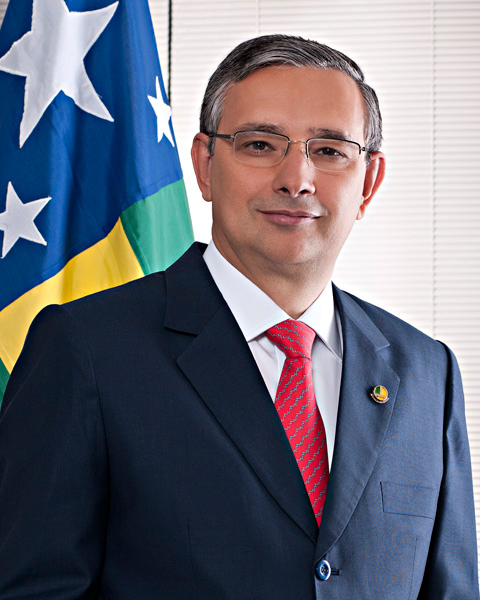

Senator for Sergipe
- In office February 1, 2011 – 31 January 2019

Federal Deputy for Sergipe
- In office February 1, 2007 – January 31, 2011

Secretary of State of Sergipe
- In office January 4, 2003 – December 29, 2004

Personal details
- Born: March 17, 1963 (age 63) Itabaiana, Sergipe
- Party: PSDB
- Other political affiliations: DEM (1995–2005); PSC (2005–2017); PSDB (2017–2022); PL (2022–2024)
- Profession: Doctor

Eduardo Amorim (born March 17, 1963) is a Brazilian politician. He has represented Sergipe in the Federal Senate since 2011. Previously he was a deputy from Sergipe from 2007 to 2011 and secretary of state of Sergipe from 2003 to 2004.
