= Aracaju =

Capital city of Sergipe, Brazil

- Municipality
- Municipality of Aracaju
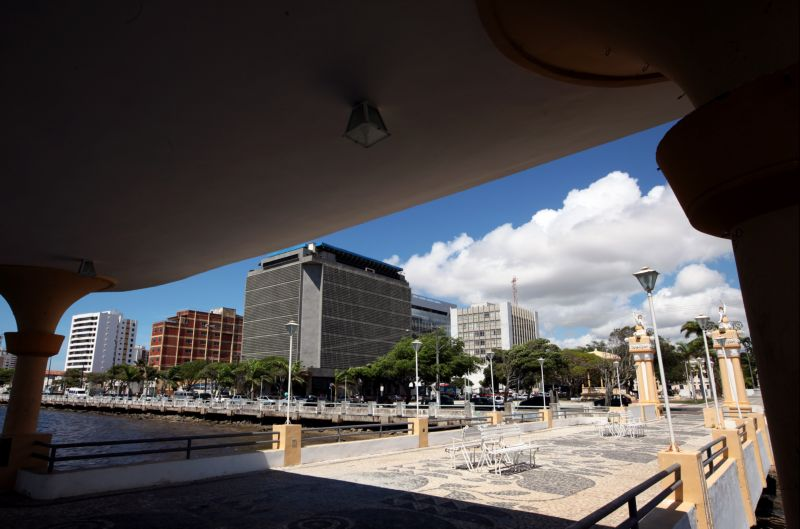
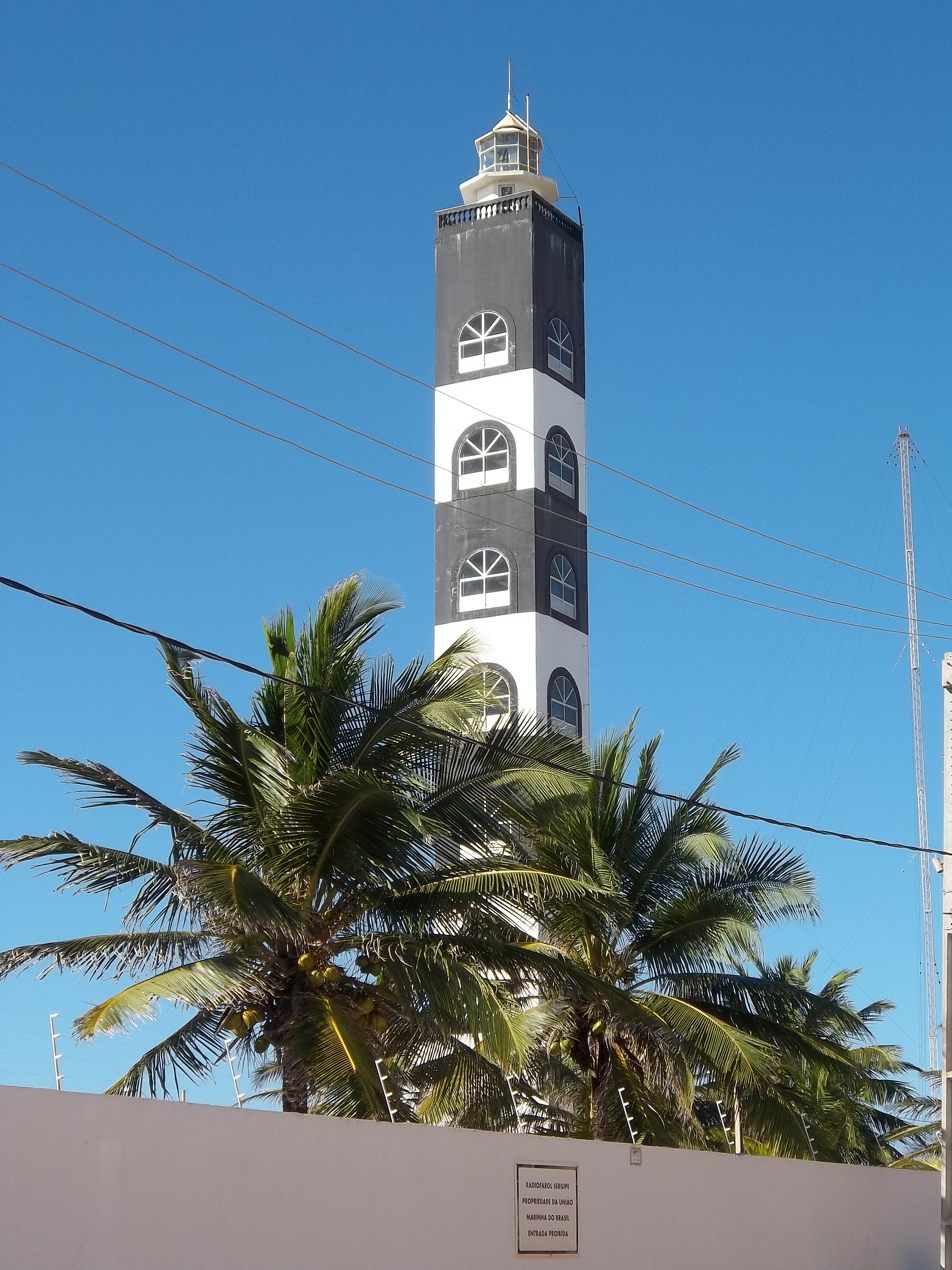
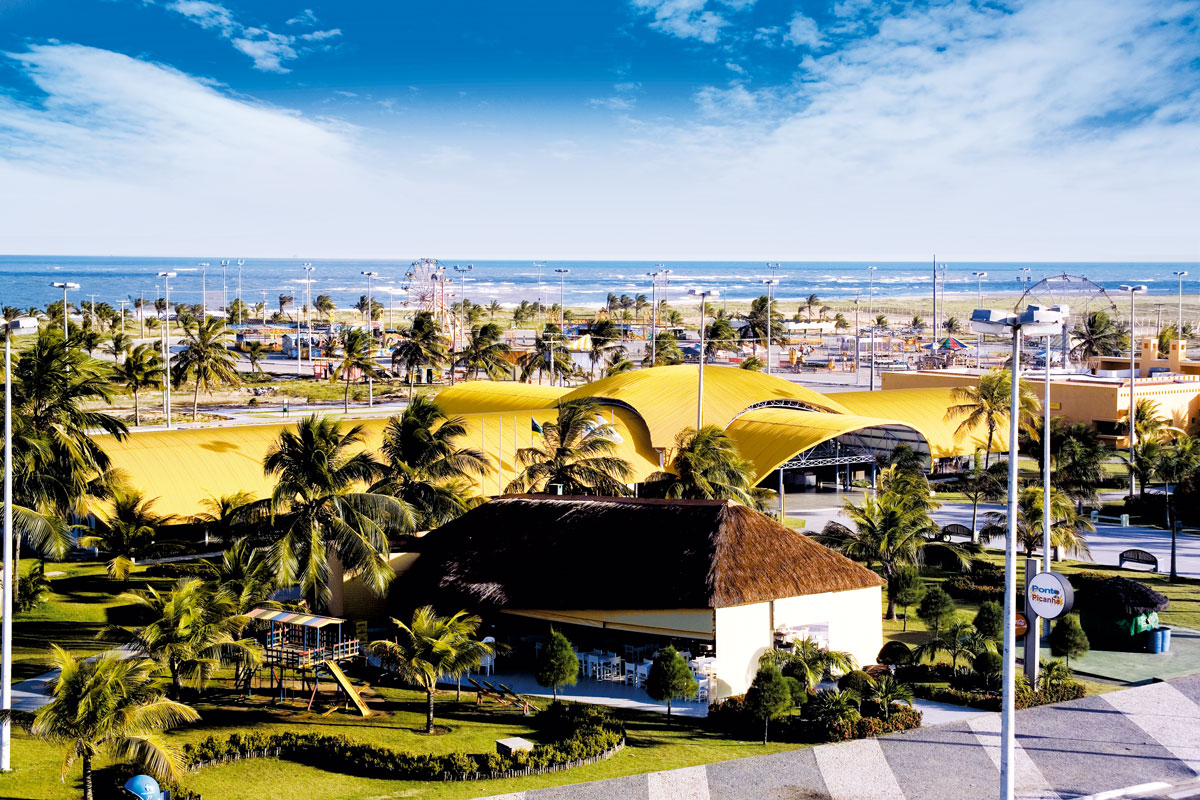
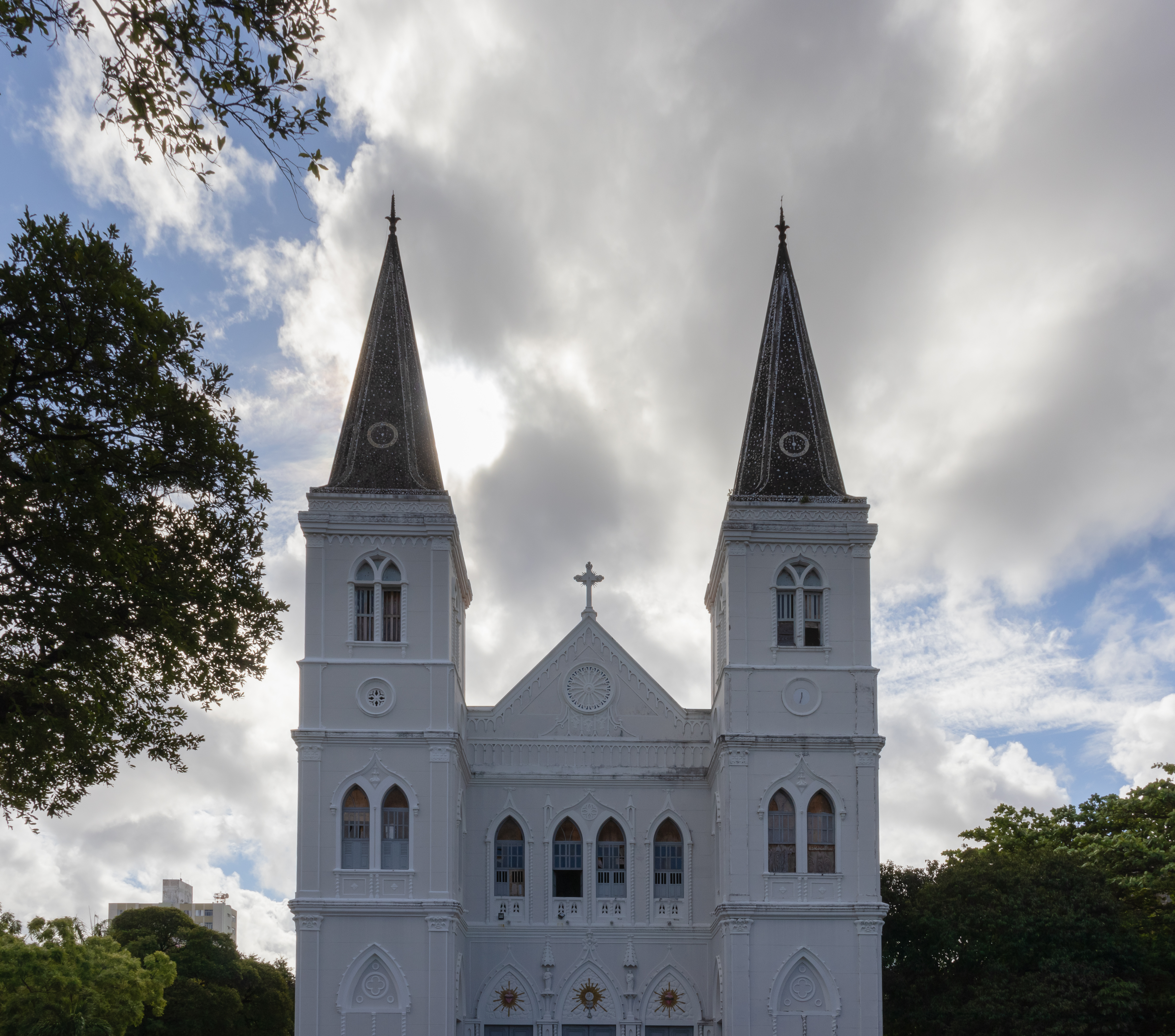
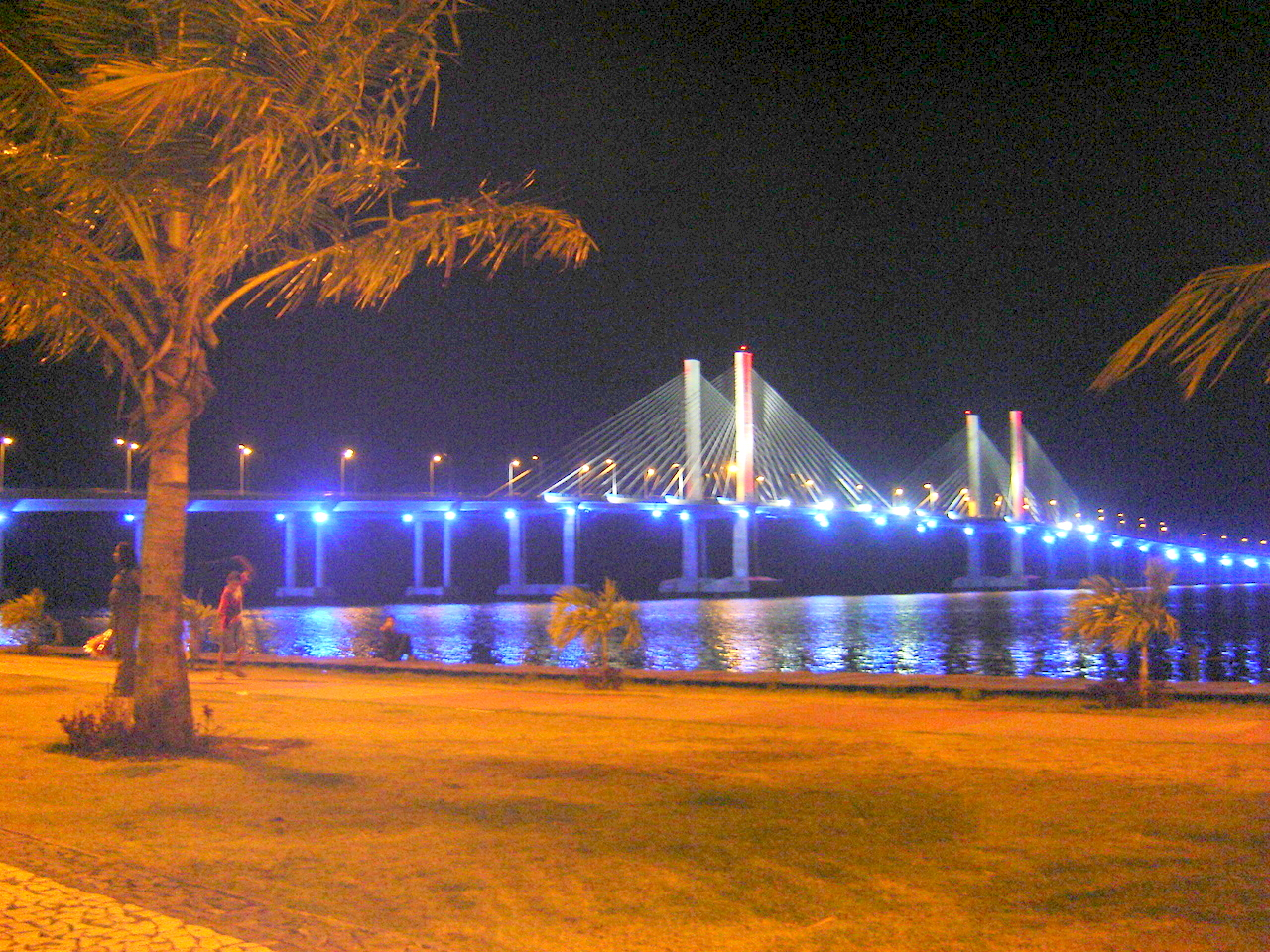
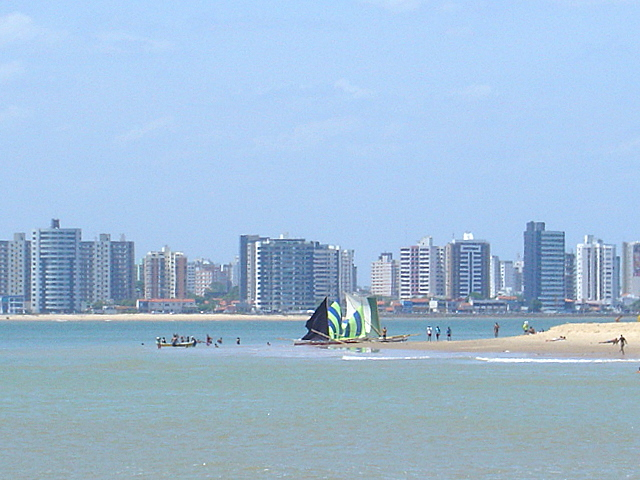
- From the top; clockwise: Aracaju seen from Imperador Bridge; Brazilian Navy Lighthouse; Aracaju Metropolitan Cathedral; Aracaju skyline and Sergipe River; Aracaju-Barra dos Coqueiros Bridge at night and Coast of Atalaia.

- Flag Coat of arms

- Location of Aracaju in Sergipe

- Coordinates: 10°54′36″S 37°04′12″W
- Country: Brazil
- Region: Northeast
- State: Sergipe
- Founded: 1592
- Incorporated (as capital): March 17, 1855

Government
  - Mayor: Emília Corrêa (PL)

Area
  - Total: 181.857 km^{2} (70.215 sq mi)
- Elevation: 4 m (13 ft)

Population (2025)
  - Total: 630,932
  - Density: 3,469.39/km^{2} (8,985.67/sq mi)
- Demonym: aracajuano or aracajuense (Portuguese)
- Time zone: UTC−3 (BRT)
- Postal code: 49000-001 a 49099-999
- Area code: +55 79
- HDI (2010): 0.770 – high
- Website: www.aracaju.se.gov.br

Aracaju (Brazilian Portuguese: [aɾakaˈʒu]; English: /ˌærəkəˈʒuː/ ARR-ə-kə-ZHOO) is the capital of the state of Sergipe, in northeastern Brazil, about 350 km (217 mi) north of Salvador. According to the 2020 estimate, the city has 664,908 inhabitants, which represents approximately 33% of the state population. Adding to the populations of the municipalities forming the Metropolitan area: Barra dos Coqueiros, Nossa Senhora do Socorro and São Cristóvão. Its Metropolitan Cathedral Nossa Senhora da Conceiçao, dedicated to Our Lady of Immaculate Conception, is the archiepiscopal see of the Roman Catholic Archdiocese of Aracaju.

== History ==
The land of present-day Aracaju was located in a sesmaria given to Pero Gonçalves by the Portuguese crown around 1602. The land consisted of 160 kilometres (99 mi) of coastline with small fishing villages. A village called Santo Antônio de Aracaju was recorded in 1699. It was located at the mouth of the Sergipe River at the Atlantic Ocean, and was founded by João Mulato, an indigenous Brazilian. The settlement saw little growth in the 18th century, and was part of the parish of Nossa Senhora do Perpétuo Socorro do Tomar do Cotinguiba. The capital of São Cristóvão presented numerous difficulties as the capital of Sergipe, primarily its inland location. São Cristóvão had only a small port on a river, and was accessed only with small boats. As a result, large ships were unable to land in Sergipe. Government officials in Sergipe began a search for land for a new capital in the 1850s. The beach that is now located in Aracaju near the mouth of the Sergipe River was a major point of interest. The state government transferred the customs and the Provincial Revenue Bureau to that location. They additionally built a post office and police sub-station. In addition, a port was built on the beach, called Atalaia.

The capital of the state of Sergipe was moved from São Cristóvão to Aracaju on March 17, 1855.

== Economy ==
The economy is based on services and industry.

The GDP for the city was R$13918124 (2013).

In recent years, the city has been invigorated by major investors from both eastern Europe (especially from Belarus and Russia) and China setting to be a key city on the BRICS relations worldwide as well as a 'Mercocity' (adopted from Mercosur).

=== Tourism and recreation ===
The city emerged as a choice for low-cost tourism and is recognized as one of the safest capitals in the Northeast region and the lowest costs of living in the country (63 murders per 100,000; No. 12 city in world; List of cities by murder rate). In more recent times, Aracaju has focused its tourism business by investing in quality accommodation such as world-renowned hostels. Planned public transportation improvements were also planned aiming to increase visitor's comfort and integration. In an effort to improve local facilities' access, bus lines have been reformed and can be monitored in real time here

Aracaju's main tourist area is the Atalaia waterfront, which combines the beach with cycle paths, sports and leisure facilities, the Arcos da Orla, the Passarela do Caranguejo and the Projeto Tamar Oceanarium. Cultural tourism is concentrated in the historic centre, where attractions include the Museu da Gente Sergipana, the Palácio-Museu Olímpio Campos, the Metropolitan Cathedral and the central markets, known for regional handicrafts and Sergipe cuisine. In the southern district of Mosqueiro, the Orla Pôr do Sol serves as a departure point for boat trips along the Vaza-Barris River to the Croa do Goré and Ilha dos Namorados.

=== Sports ===
At the 2016 Summer Olympics the city hosted teams from seven countries. Football athletes from Japan and gymnasts and swimmers curiously mostly from many eastern European countries like Poland, Austria, Belarus, Kazakhstan, Ukraine and Czech Republic established the city as home-base for training.

For the 2016 Summer Paralympics Games the city is accommodating athletes from Eurasian Economic Community countries such as the Kazakhstani paralympic team and the Belarus paralympic team, including paralympic swimmer champion Ihar Boki.

== Transportation ==
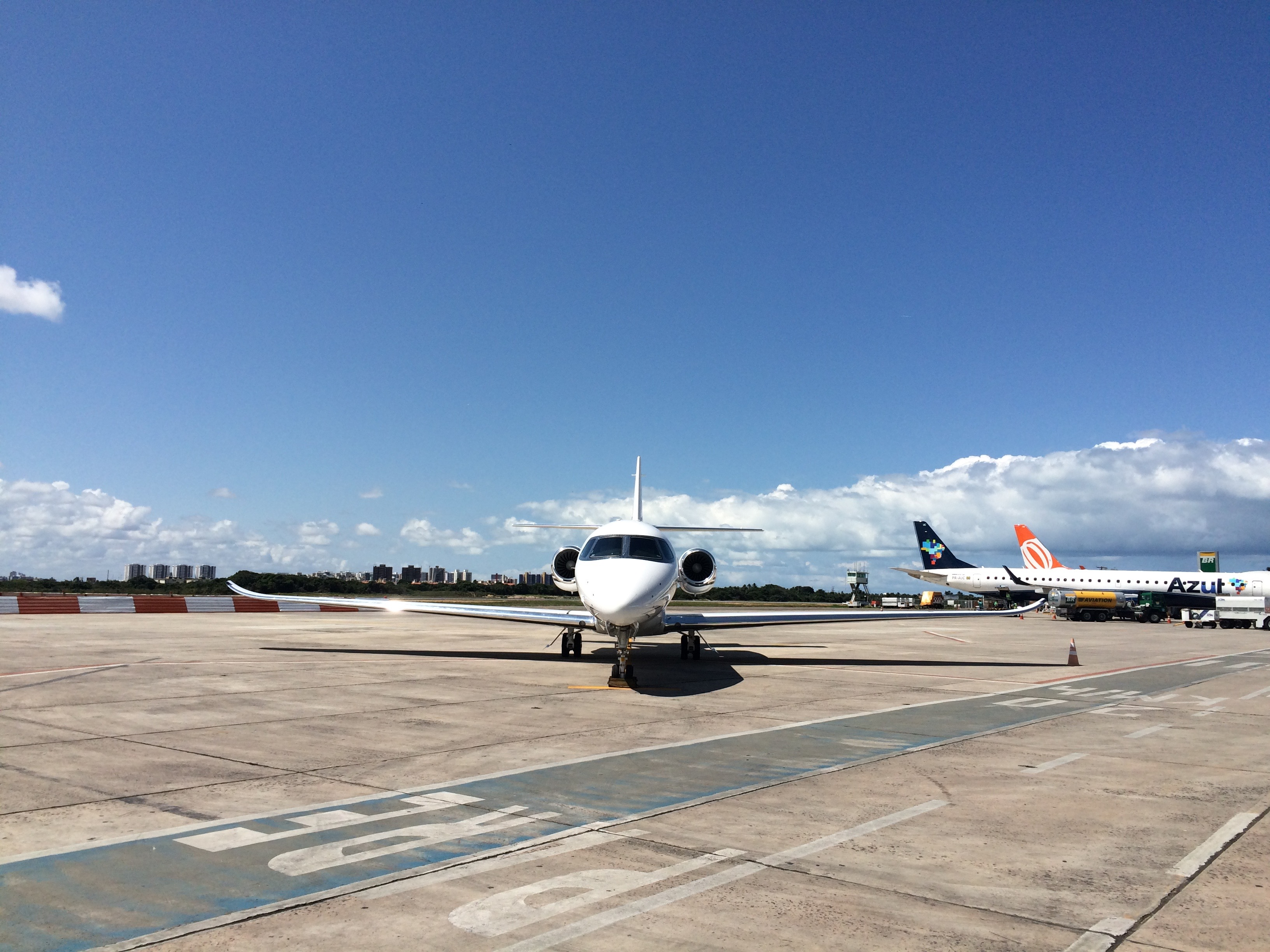
View of Santa Maria Airport

=== Air ===
Aracaju is served by Santa Maria Airport, a domestic commercial airport. It dates to 1952 and became fully functional in 1958. The airport is located in the Santa Maria neighborhood of the city and is located 12 kilometres (7.5 mi) from downtown Aracaju.

=== Roads ===
Aracaju is located on the northern segment of BR-101, a major north–south longitudinal highway in Brazil. It is also the easternmost point of BR-235, an incomplete highway which is projected to run from Aracaju west to Novo Progresso, Pará.

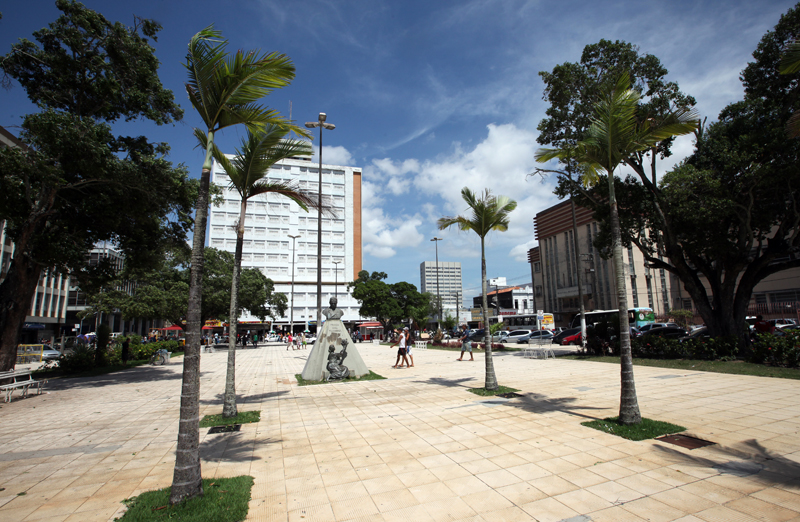
General Valadão square

== Educational institutions ==
- Federal University of Sergipe
- Universidade Norte do Paraná (Unopar)

== Geography ==
The geographical area containing Aracaju is antipodal with the more famous Mariana Trench in northern hemisphere.

=== Climate ===
Aracaju's climate is hot and humid, and the city experiences a tropical savanna climate. The average annual temperature is 26 °C or 78.8 °F and average annual rainfall is 1,695.3 millimetres or 66.74 inches.

The hottest months Aracaju experiences are January, February and March, with temperatures averaging 27 °C or 80.6 °F, while the average highs are 30 °C or 86 °F and the minimum is 24 °C or 75.2 °F. The mildest are July and August, with temperatures averaging 24 °C or 75.2 °F, with a mean maximum not exceeding 28 °C or 82.4 °F, and at night the temperature drops to 22 °C or 71.6 °F. However, it may happen that the temperature gets warmer in "winter" and cooler in "summer", as in 2002.

Aracaju experiences its wettest months between March and July, owing to the strong wind created by lower temperatures in the South and Southeast. During this period, the average amount of rainfall exceeds 200 millimetres or 8 inches per month, and the rainiest month of all is May, when rainfall averages approximately 334 millimetres or 13.15 inches. The driest months, between September and February, see the winds weakening and only really managing to bring light clouds. There is also less rain. The driest month is November, when rainfall averages approximately 52 millimetres or 2.05 inches. The average rainfall during these months is between approximately 50 and 100 millimetres (1.97 and 3.94 in).

Climate data for Aracaju (1991–2020 normals, extremes 1931–present)
Month	Jan	Feb	Mar	Apr	May	Jun	Jul	Aug	Sep	Oct	Nov	Dec	Year
Record high °C (°F)	34.2 (93.6)	34.3 (93.7)	36.9 (98.4)	36.4 (97.5)	36.4 (97.5)	31.9 (89.4)	30.9 (87.6)	30.6 (87.1)	31.7 (89.1)	32.6 (90.7)	33.7 (92.7)	34.8 (94.6)	36.9 (98.4)
Mean daily maximum °C (°F)	30.6 (87.1)	30.8 (87.4)	30.9 (87.6)	30.4 (86.7)	29.6 (85.3)	28.6 (83.5)	27.9 (82.2)	27.9 (82.2)	28.4 (83.1)	29.2 (84.6)	29.8 (85.6)	30.2 (86.4)	29.5 (85.1)
Daily mean °C (°F)	27.3 (81.1)	27.5 (81.5)	27.7 (81.9)	27.3 (81.1)	26.5 (79.7)	25.6 (78.1)	24.9 (76.8)	24.9 (76.8)	25.4 (77.7)	26.2 (79.2)	26.7 (80.1)	27.1 (80.8)	26.4 (79.6)
Mean daily minimum °C (°F)	23.9 (75.0)	24.1 (75.4)	24.0 (75.2)	23.7 (74.7)	23.0 (73.4)	22.3 (72.1)	21.9 (71.4)	21.8 (71.2)	22.5 (72.5)	23.1 (73.6)	23.5 (74.3)	23.8 (74.8)	23.1 (73.6)
Record low °C (°F)	18.4 (65.1)	18.8 (65.8)	19.5 (67.1)	18.1 (64.6)	17.8 (64.0)	17.3 (63.1)	16.4 (61.5)	14.6 (58.3)	17.1 (62.8)	17.0 (62.6)	16.6 (61.9)	16.0 (60.8)	14.6 (58.3)
Average precipitation mm (inches)	43.0 (1.69)	66.7 (2.63)	73.3 (2.89)	153.9 (6.06)	226.9 (8.93)	198.4 (7.81)	149.5 (5.89)	97.4 (3.83)	61.9 (2.44)	56.0 (2.20)	38.3 (1.51)	24.0 (0.94)	1,189.3 (46.82)
Average precipitation days (≥ 1 mm)	5.7	6.9	8.4	12.8	16.4	17.2	17.7	15.3	9.3	6.2	5.3	3.5	124.7
Average relative humidity (%)	74.0	74.2	74.3	75.3	77.7	77.9	77.7	76.8	76.2	75.9	75.7	74.7	75.9
Average dew point °C (°F)	22.8 (73.0)	23.0 (73.4)	23.2 (73.8)	23.0 (73.4)	22.7 (72.9)	21.8 (71.2)	21.1 (70.0)	20.9 (69.6)	21.3 (70.3)	21.9 (71.4)	22.3 (72.1)	22.5 (72.5)	22.2 (72.0)
Mean monthly sunshine hours	275.5	243.1	255.3	224.2	205.5	179.6	189.7	212.5	238.8	274.1	275.5	287.4	2,861.2
Mean daily daylight hours	12.7	12.4	12.2	11.9	11.6	11.5	11.5	11.8	12.1	12.4	12.6	12.8	12.1
Average ultraviolet index	7	7	7	7	7	6	6	6	7	7	7	7	7
Source 1: INMET(Temperatures), (Precipitation), (Humidity), (Dew Point), (Sun
Source 2: NOAA Weather atlas(Daylight-UV) Brazilian National Institute of Meteorology (INMET).
