= Operation Car Wash =

2014–2021 Brazilian criminal investigation into corruption

Operation Car Wash Operação Lava Jato
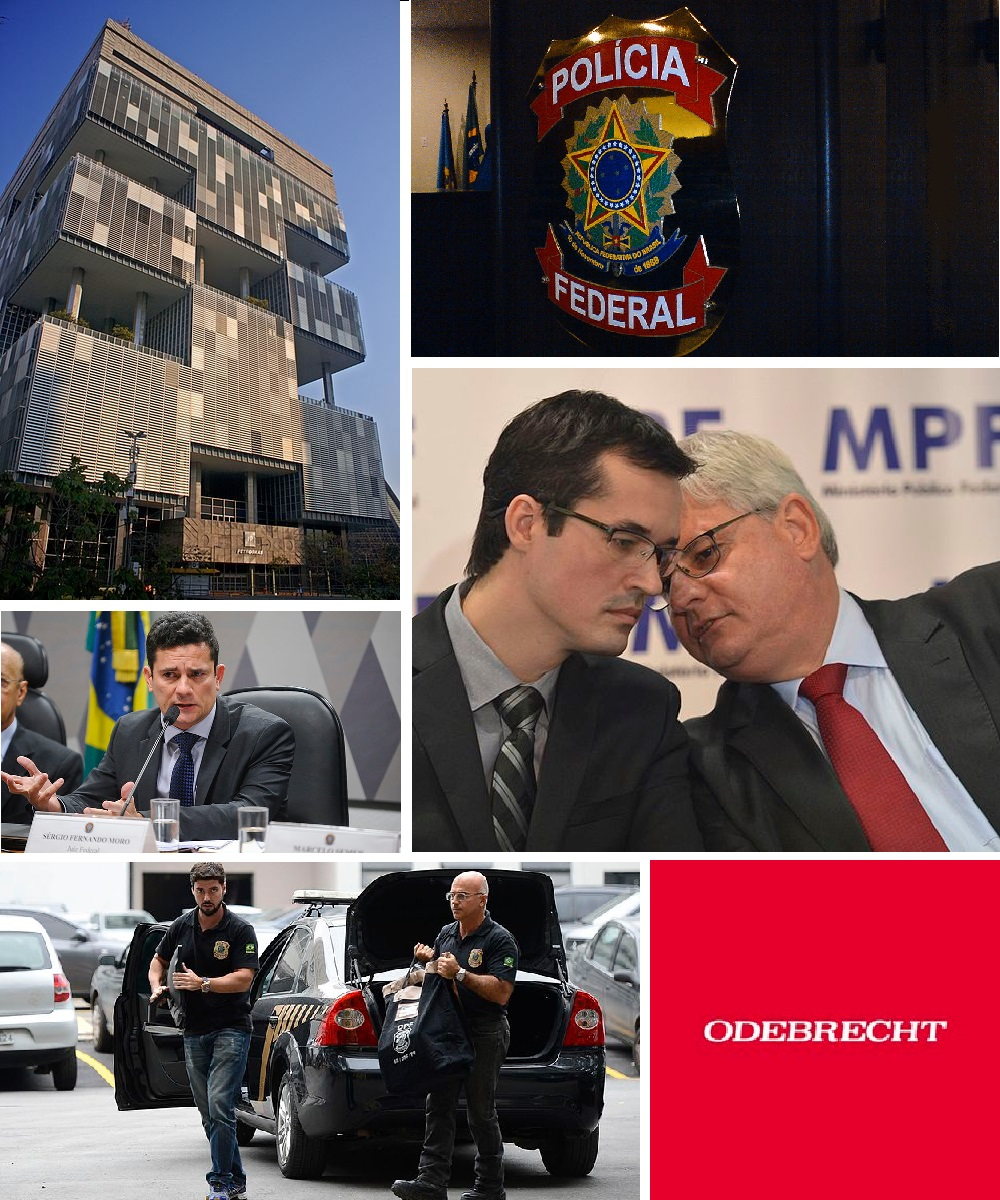
- Clockwise from top left: Headquarters of Petrobras in Rio de Janeiro; Emblem of the Federal Police of Brazil; Deltan Dallagnol with Rodrigo Janot; Odebrecht logo; Federal Police in an operation; Judge Sergio Moro
- Type: Anti-corruption
- Scope: Brazilian federal government

Participants
- Executed by: Lead prosecutor: Deltan Dallagnol (March 2014 – September 2020); Primary judge: Sergio Moro (March 2014 – November 2018); All judges: Judge: (Curitiba); Sergio Moro 17 March 2014 – 2 November 2018; Gabriela Hardt presiding as substitute 2019 to 6 March 2019; Luiz Antonio Bonat 6 March 2019 – 1 February 2021; Federal judge: (Rio de Janeiro); Marcelo Bretas (2015–2021); Federal judge: (Brasília); Vallisney de Souza Oliveira (2016–2021); Federal judge: (Porto Alegre); Leandro Paulsen (2015–2021); João Pedro Gebran Neto (2015–2021); Judge: (Superior Court of Justice); Felix Fischer (2015–2021); Judge: (Supreme Federal Court); Teori Zavascki (2014–2017); Edson Fachin (2017–2021)
- Countries participating: Brazil
- No. of countries participating: At least 11

Timeline
- Date begin: 2014
- Date end: 2021

Results
- Suspects: 429 individuals
- Indictments: 429
- Convictions: 159
- Miscellaneous results: Penalties paid by Petrobras: US$682.6 million to the Brazilian government; US$85.3 million to the US Department of Justice; US$85.3 million to the United States Securities and Exchange Commission; R$6.2 billion (US$2.5 billion) identified as misappropriated from Petrobras; R$46.3 billion (c. US$8 billion) reimbursement requested by Petrobras; R$3.28 billion (US$912 million) recovered

Operation Car Wash (Portuguese: Operação Lava Jato, pronounced [opeɾaˈsɐ̃w̃ ˈlavɐ ˈʒatu]) was a landmark anti-corruption probe in Brazil. Beginning in March 2014 as the investigation of a small car wash in Brasília over money laundering, the proceedings uncovered a massive corruption scheme in the Brazilian federal government, particularly in state-owned enterprises. The probe was conducted through Brazil's antitrust regulator. Evidence was collected and presented to the court system by a team of federal prosecutors led by Deltan Dallagnol, while the judge in charge of the operation was Sergio Moro. Eventually, other federal prosecutors and judges would go on to oversee related cases under their jurisdictions in various Brazilian states. The operation implicated leading businessmen, federal congressmen, senators, state governors, federal government ministers, and former presidents Collor, Temer and Lula. Companies and individuals accused of involvement have agreed to pay 25 billion reais in fines and restitution of embezzled public funds.

According to investigators, political appointees in state-owned enterprises systematically extorted bribes from private-sector suppliers. Part of these bribes was channeled to political parties (particularly the MDB, PT, PSDB and PP), in order to illegally fund political campaigns (via caixa dois), as well as for personal gain. The largest amounts of bribes were detected in oil giant Petrobras; company directors negotiated with contractors to receive illegal kickbacks ranging from 1% to 5% of disbursements. Due to its pervasiveness in Petrobras, the scandal is also known as Petrolão (Portuguese for "big oil"). Investigators have also stated that contractors formed a cartel, involving the country's largest engineering conglomerates such as Odebrecht, Grupo OAS, Andrade Gutierrez, and Carioca Engenharia, to share government contracts among themselves and collude with corrupt politicians. Allegedly, the cartel also operated in contracts signed directly with government agencies, in projects such as the construction of football stadiums for the 2014 FIFA World Cup, the Angra III nuclear power plant, the Belo Monte Dam, and the North-South and Fiol railways. Prosecutors also tracked overseas operations, and cooperated with authorities from 61 countries, among which Switzerland, the United States and Peru were the most frequent collaborating parties.

Appeals against rulings by Judge Sergio Moro were processed in the Brazilian justice system, in which the Supreme Federal Court (STF) is the court of last resort. Some of the contested issues were the stage at which convicted defendants would begin to serve their sentences, and the extensive use of plea bargains by prosecutors. In a 2016 decision penned by STF judge Teori Zavascki, the Court found that prison terms should be served once a sentence was confirmed by the local appeals court. This was welcomed by prosecutors as an incentive against illegal practices. Teori Zavascki, the judge overseeing the prosecution, died in a plane crash off the coast of Paraty, in January 2017, and the investigation lost a key backer in the Supreme Federal Court. In 2019, the STF reverted its ruling, and decided that prison sentences only take effect in Brazil after all possible appeals to higher courts are exhausted.

In January 2019, Sergio Moro announced that he would resign from his position as a federal judge, to join the incoming administration of right-wing president Jair Bolsonaro as Justice Minister. This move drew criticism, since Moro had sentenced former president Lula, Bolsonaro's leading rival in the presidential race. Moro fell out of favor with Bolsonaro and left his post in April 2020. He was replaced as the judge in the case by Luiz Bonat.

The probe's reputation was further damaged by revelations arising from a leak of personal conversations between investigators by hacker Walter Delgatti Neto. Delgatti hacked the investigative authorities' online communications over Telegram groups. Dubbed Vaza Jato, the leak purports to expose undue pre-trial coordination between Judge Moro and prosecutors in the case to produce evidence, direct hearings and discuss possible sentencing. The hacking leak was published in the press by The Intercept Brasil and journalist Glenn Greenwald, who claimed that Moro passed on "advice, investigative leads, and inside information to the prosecutors" to "prevent Lula's Workers' Party from winning" the 2018 Brazilian general election. Moro and Dallagnol deny any wrongdoing; they maintain that the contents of the leak have not been confirmed and that, furthermore, no proof of illegal conduct was present in the leaks. Nevertheless, the leaks marked a shift in public opinion, having caused the investigation to lose support. The task force was officially disbanded on 1 February 2021.

Over time, the methods of prosecutors came under strong criticism from Supreme Federal Court judges. In March 2019, judge Gilmar Mendes referred, in a Court session, to Operation Car Wash investigators as "gangsters and scum", adding that their "methods dishonor institutions". In September 2023, STF judge Dias Toffoli stated that the arrest of President Lula was a "setup", "one of the gravest errors in the country's judicial history", and declared all evidence obtained from a settlement with Odebrecht null and void, adding that Operation Car Wash acted as a "21st-century pau de arara". Chief prosecutor Augusto Aras believes that Operation Car Wash left a "cursed legacy".

== Investigation ==
The initial accusation came from businessman Hermes Magnus in 2008, who reported an attempt to launder money through his company, Dunel Indústria e Comércio, a manufacturer of electronic components. Ensuing investigations culminated in the identification of four large criminal rings, headed by: Carlos Habib Chater, Alberto Youssef, Nelma Kodama, and Raul Henrique Srour.

Investigation at first focused on the four black-market currency dealers and improper payments to Alberto Youssef by companies who had won contracts at Petrobras' Abreu and Lima refinery. After they discovered that doleiro (black-market dealer) Alberto Youssef had acquired a Range Rover Evoque for Paulo Roberto Costa, a former director of Petrobras, the investigation expanded nationwide. Once he was charged, Costa agreed to provide evidence to the investigation. A newly adopted law introduced 'rewarded collaboration' (Colaboração premiada) (Note: Colaboração premiada – literally, "rewarded collaboration"; the common name for the legal process known as delação premiada.) (Note: Delação premiada – "rewarded whistleblowing" (or, "informing"). A legal process by which a suspect is offered a specific reduced sentence prescribed by law, in return for turning in accomplices, or aiding in investigations. The common name for it in Brazil is Colaboração premiada ("rewarded collaboration"). The concept is similar to a plea bargain, in return for investigative assistance.) a type of plea bargaining involving sentence reductions for defendants who cooperate in investigations. Costa's deposition showed which political parties controlled Petrobras.

It also led to a wave of arrests. Fernando Soares, also known as "Fernando Baiano", a businessman and lobbyist, was allegedly the connection between major Brazilian construction firms and the government formed by the Workers’ Party (PT) and Brazilian Democratic Movement (PMDB). After Costa and Soares, many others agreed to collaborate with the prosecution; between 2014 and February 2016, the Federal Public Prosecutor's Office (Portuguese: Ministério Público da União) filed 37 criminal charges against 179 people, mostly politicians and businessmen. In December 2017, nearly three hundred people had been accused of crimes in the scandal. After Marcelo Odebrecht, grandson of the company founder, was sentenced to 19 years in prison, he and other Odebrecht executives were, due to the sentence reduction incentives of the 'rewarded collaboration' law, willing to act as witnesses and to give information about the broader corruption scheme. Odebrecht had a secret branch (Note: Setor de propina – lit., "bribery section", or "bribery department". This is a slang term or nickname for Odebrecht S.A.'s Structured Operations Division (Setor de Operações Estruturais), because it was that department within the company that was responsible for managing and paying kickbacks and bribes. There isn't sufficient usage in English sources to have settled on one term for it, but "bribery department" is present in a BBC report.) used to make illegal payments in several Latin American countries, from Hugo Chávez in Venezuela to Ricardo Martinelli in Panama. Odebrecht was given fines totalling $2.6 billion by authorities of Brazil, Switzerland, and the United States after the company admitted bribing officials in twelve countries with some $788 million.

Costa and Youssef entered into a plea bargain with prosecutors and the scope of the investigation widened to nine major Brazilian construction firms: Camargo Correa, Construtora OAS, UTC Engenharia, Odebrecht, Mendes Júnior, Engevix, Queiroz Galvão, IESA Óleo e Gás, and Galvão Engenharia, as well as politicians involved with Petrobras. Brazilian President Dilma Rousseff, who chaired the board of Petrobras from 2003 to 2010, denied knowledge of any wrongdoing. The Brazilian Supreme Court authorized the investigation of 48 current and former legislators, including former President Luiz Inácio Lula da Silva, in March 2016. Eduardo Cunha, president of the Chamber of Deputies from 2015 to 2016, was convicted of taking approximately $40 million in bribes and hiding funds in secret bank accounts and sentenced to 15 years in prison.

On 19 January 2017, a small plane carrying Supreme Court Justice Teori Zavascki crashed into the sea near the tourist city of Paraty in the state of Rio de Janeiro, killing the magistrate and four other people. Zavascki had been handling Operation Car Wash corruption trials.

A Miami Herald report noted in September 2017 that when Operation Car Wash began in 2014, fewer than 10,000 electronic monitoring bracelets were in use to enforce home detention sentences; by September 2017 the number had ballooned to more than 24,000.

== Effect on Petrobras ==
Petrobras delayed reporting its annual financial results for 2014, and in April 2015 released "audited financial statements" showing $2.1 billion in bribes and a total of almost $17 billion in write-downs due to graft and overvalued assets, which the company characterized as a "conservative" estimate. Had the report been delayed by another week, Petrobras bondholders would have had the right to demand early repayment. Petrobras also suspended dividend payments for 2015. Due in part to the impact of the scandal, as well as to its high debt burden and the low price of oil, Petrobras was also forced to cut capital expenditures and announced it would sell $13.7 billion in assets over the following two years.

The conviction of Aldemir Bendine, Petrobras' former CEO, on corruption charges was annulled by the Supreme Federal Court in 2019 due to objections to the trial procedure.

== Domestic politics ==
- The treasurer of the Workers' Party (PT), João Vaccari Neto, was arrested for receiving "irregular donations".
- The former chief of staff for President Lula, José Dirceu, was arrested for organising a large part of the bribery.
- The President of the Chamber of Deputies, Eduardo Cunha (PMDB-RJ), was investigated for receiving more than US$40 million in kickbacks and bribes.
- Former president (1990–1992) and senator (2007–2023) Fernando Collor de Mello was charged with corruption.

On 8 March 2016, Marcelo Odebrecht, CEO of Odebrecht and grandson of the company's founder, was sentenced to 19 years in prison after being convicted of paying more than $30 million in bribes to Petrobras executives.

In April 2018, former president Luiz Inácio Lula da Silva – after having been sentenced for passive corruption and money laundering in relation to a luxury apartment in Guarujá received from Grupo OAS – entered prison in Curitiba to serve his 12-year sentence. However, illegal communications between Car Wash prosecutors and its lead judge came to light in mid-2019, in which the parties suggested that their prosecutorial motive was to prevent Lula's re-election. There were calls to release the former president (see Leaked conversations below). As a result, he was released on 8 November 2019 after a Supreme Court ruling.

On 3 July 2018, failed Brazilian billionaire Eike Batista was convicted of bribing former Rio de Janeiro governor Sérgio Cabral Filho for state government contracts, having paid Cabral US$16.6 million, and was sentenced to 30 years imprisonment.

=== Political parties ===
==== Lula and the Worker's Party ====
Emílio Odebrecht said in a written report to the Attorney General of Brazil's Office (PGR) that he discussed donations to Worker's Party's (PT) campaigns with former PT president Lula. Financial support, according to the contractor, came even before Lula became president. Marcelo Odebrecht said that the "Amigo" account for former President Luiz Inácio Lula da Silva, was created in 2010 with a balance of R$40 million. In his statement, he said he gave the money to Antonio Palocci, former Finance Minister and Rousseff's chief of staff, who had been the PT's contact with Odebrecht since the prior administration, when Emílio Alves Odebrecht and Pedro Novis had handled payments. He said that in the middle of 2010, at the end of the Lula administration, he knew that Dilma Rousseff was going to take over and that the balance of the account would be "managed by her at her request". Thus, he set apart a sum that would be destined exclusively for the former president. He said that Lula never asked directly for donations and that everything was done through Palocci, but it became clear that the donations were ultimately for the former president.

On 4 March 2016, Lula was questioned for three hours as part of the fraud inquiry into the dealings of Petrobras, and his house raided by federal police agents. Lula, who left office in 2011, denied allegations of corruption. Police said they had evidence that Lula had received kickbacks. Lula's institute called actions against him "arbitrary, illegal and unjustifiable", since he had been cooperating with the investigations. Lula, convicted of accepting bribes worth 3.7 million reals (Note: Reals: A real is the Brazilian unit of currency. The plural form in Portuguese is reais, following the standard orthographic rules for pluralization of Portuguese nouns ending in -al. The plural in English is reals or reais.) (1.2 million dollars), was sentenced on 12 July to nine and a half years in prison. He appealed the sentence to the Federal Regional Court-4, which increased his sentence to twelve years and a month. On 5 April 2018, Moro ordered his imprisonment, and he surrendered two days later.

==== Temer and Brazilian Democratic Movement ====
The plea bargain testimony by Odebrecht Engenharia Industrial's former president Márcio Faria da Silva said that on 15 July 2010, President Michel Temer led a meeting about an agreement to pay approximately US$40 million in bribes to the Brazilian Democratic Movement in exchange for contracts with the international Board of Directors of Petrobras. According to Faria, Temer, who at the time was a candidate for vice-president on Dilma Rousseff's ticket, delegated to Eduardo Cunha and Henrique Eduardo Alves, then deputies and present at the meeting, the task of making the payments which represented 5% of the contract's value. The meeting took place in Temer's political office in São Paulo. He did not discuss any details about the financial agreement, limiting himself to trivial conversations about politics.

==== Aécio and Brazilian Social Democracy Party ====
Marcelo Odebrecht said in his plea bargain testimony that the Social Democratic (PSDB) party, led by Senator Aécio Neves (PSDB-MG), received at least 50 million reals in exchange for favoring the business contractor in energy deals. He said that improper payments were made due to business deals with two state companies: Furnas and Cemig. The first federal investigation was under the leadership of Dimas Toledo, an ally of Neves, in the early years of the Lula administration (2003–2005). The second state-run investigation was influenced by Aécio during the period when the PSDB was in power in Minas Gerais (2003–2014).

=== Political families ===
Odebrecht also discussed family involvement. In eleven cases under the jurisdiction of the Supreme Federal Court (STF), investigations implicate father and son, husband and wife, or siblings. The president of the Chamber, Rodrigo Maia (DEM-RJ), has the most family members implicated. Maia was charged in the same investigation as his father, councilor and former mayor Cesar Maia. According to the Odebrecht testimony, Rodrigo obtained cash resources both for his father's campaign and also for himself. The Brazilian Democratic Movement leader of the Senate, Renan Calheiros (AL), was charged along with his son, the governor of Alagoas Renan Filho (PMDB), in two inquiries. They allegedly participated in an agreement to divert resources from work on the Canal do Sertão and also received resources in the form of a slush fund they refer to as a caixa 2. In the case of the father, two other inquiries are ongoing.

The governor of Rio Grande do Norte, Robinson Faria (PSD), was charged along with his son, federal deputy Fábio Faria (PSD-RN). The two allegedly received contributions through a slush fund in return for defending Odebrecht Ambiental's interests in the area of basic sanitation in the state. The president of the PMDB, Senator Romero Jucá (RR), and his son Rodrigo Jucá both figured in one of the inquiries. The father helped Odebrecht negotiate a provisional measure and obtained an electoral donation of 150,000 reals for his son. Romero Jucá was also charged in four other inquiries. A father asking for a contribution for a son was also why former minister José Dirceu was investigated along with Zeca Dirceu, federal deputy. The father was able to raise the money for Zeca in exchange for the acting for Odebrecht's interests in the government.

In the Chamber of Deputies, the sons Antônio Britto (PSD-BA) and Daniel Vilela (PMDB-GO) were also investigated along with their parents, Edvaldo Brito (PTB-BA) and Maguito Vilela (PMDB-GO). Senator Kátia Abreu (PMDB-TO) was accompanied by her husband Moisés Pinto Gomes, who brokered cash payments for her in 2014. Senator Vanessa Grazziotin (PCdoB-AM) is accompanied by her husband, Eron Bezerra, said to have asked for slush fund cash donations for her. Federal Deputy Décio Nery de Lima (PT-SC) also requested slush funds for the Blumenau municipal campaign in 2012 of his wife, state deputy Ana Paula Lima (PT-SC). The Viana brothers of Acre, Governor Tião Viana (PT) and Senator Jorge Viana (PT), were also charged together. Jorge asked for and Odebrecht paid R$1.5 million in cash two for Tião's campaign in 2010.

=== Politicians and public figures implicated ===
==== Payments to Brazilian senators ====
The names of the senators cited in the report were:

- Romero Jucá (PMDB-RR)
- Benedito de Lira (PP-AL)
- Delcídio do Amaral (PT-MS)
- Beto Richa (PSDB)
- Aécio Neves da Cunha (PSDB-MG)
- Renan Calheiros (PMDB-AL)
- Fernando Bezerra Coelho (PMDB-PE)
- Paulo Rocha (PT-PA)
- Humberto Costa (PT-PE)
- Edison Lobão (PMDB-PA)
- Cássio Cunha Lima (PSDB-PB)
- Jorge Viana (PT-AC)
- Lídice da Mata (Brazilian Socialist Party) (PSB-BA)
- José Agripino Maia (DEM-RN)
- Marta Suplicy (PMDB-SP)
- Ciro Nogueira (PP-PI)
- Dalírio Beber Social Democrat (PSDB-SC)
- Ivo Cassol Progressistas (PP-RO)
- Lindbergh Farias (PT-RJ)
- Vanessa Grazziotin Communist Party (PCdoB-AM)
- Kátia Abreu (PMDB-TO)
- Fernando Collor de Mello (PTC-AL)
- José Serra (PSDB-SP)
- Eduardo Braga (PMDB-AM)
- Omar Aziz (PSD-AM)
- Valdir Raupp (PMDB-RO)
- Eunício Oliveira (PMDB-CE)
- Eduardo Amorim (PSDB-SE)
- Maria do Carmo Alves (DEM-SE)
- Garibaldi Alves Filho (PMDB-RN)
- Ricardo Ferraço (PSDB-ES)
- Antônio Anastasia (PSDB-MG)

===== Payments to federal deputies =====
The names of the federal deputies cited in the Odebrecht statement were:

- Dilceu Sperafico (PP-PR)
- Cândido Vaccarezza (AVANTE-SP)
- Carlos Magno Ramos (PP-RO)
- Cacá Leão (PP-BA)
- Arthur Lira (PP-AL)
- Valdemar Costa Neto (PR)
- Afonso Hamm (PP-RS)
- Aguinaldo Ribeiro (PP-PB)
- Aline Corrêa (PP-SP)
- André Luiz Vargas Ilário (Independent-PR)
- Aníbal Gomes (PMDB-CE)
- Rodrigo Maia (DEM-RM)
- Paulinho da Força Solidarity (SD-SP)
- Marco Maia (PT-RS)
- Carlos Zarattini (PT-SP)
- João Carlos Bacelar (PSC-BA)
- Milton Monti (PR-SP)
- Daniel Almeida (PCdoB-BA)
- Mário Negromonte Jr (PP-BA)
- Nelson Pelegrino (PT-BA)
- Daniel Vilela (PMDB-GO)
- Jutahy Júnior (PSDB)
- Felipe Maia (DEM-RN)
- Onyx Lorenzoni (DEM-RS)
- Pedro Paulo Teixeira (PMDB-RJ)
- Jarbas Vasconcelos (PMDB-PE)
- Celso Russomano (PRB-SP)
- Dimas Toledo (PP-MG)
- Alfredo Nascimento Party of Republic (PR-AM)
- Antonio Brito (PTB-BA)
- Arlindo Chinaglia (PT-SC)
- Heráclito Fortes (PSB-PI)
- Zeca Dirceu (PT-PR)
- Betinho Gomes Social Democrats (PSDB-PE)
- Zeca do PT (PT-SP)
- Fábio Faria (PSD-MS)
- José Carneiro (PSB-MA)
- Júlio Lopes (PP-RJ)
- Paulo Lustosa (PMDB-CE)
- Rodrigo Garcia (DEM-SP)
- Lúcio Vieira Lima Partido do Movimento Democrático Brasileiro (PMDB-BA)
- Vander Loubet (PT-MS)
- Vicente Cândido (PT-SP)
- Yeda Crusius (PSDB-RS)

==== Other Brazilian public figures ====
The names in the Odebrecht statement include other politicians and former public officials:

- Antonio Palocci (PT-SP)
- Eduardo Paes (PMDB) – Former mayor of Rio de Janeiro
- César Maia (DEM) – Former mayor of Rio de Janeiro
- Rosalba Ciarlini Rosado (PP) – former mayor of Mossoró, governor of Rio Grande do Norte.
- Guido Mantega (PT) – Former Finance Minister under Lula and Rousseff
- José Dirceu (PT) – Former Lula minister
- Napoleão Bernardes – Prefect of Blumenau for the PSDB
- Paulo Bernardo (PT) – Former Minister of Communication
- Luiz Maguito (PMDB) – Former senator and mayor
- Humberto Kasper – Former director of Trensurb in Rio Grande do Sul
- Marco Arildo Prates da Cunha – Former director of Trensurb
- Ana Paula Lima (PT)– Member
- Rodrigo Jucá (PMDB-AL) – Son of Senator Romero Jucá
- Oswaldo Borges da Costa – Businessman linked to Aécio Neves
- Vital do Rêgo Filho – minister of the Federal Court of Audits
- Eron Bezerra, Partido Comunista do Brasil (PCdoB) – Former state deputy for Amazonas
- Ulisses César Martins de Sousa – Lawyer and former attorney general of the State of Maranhão
- Edvaldo Pereira de Brito (PTB) – Former mayor of Salvador, linked to Deputy Antonio de Brito
- José Ivaldo Gomes
- Vado da Farmárcia – Former Mayor of Cabo de Santo Agostinho PE
- João Carlos Gonçalves Ribeiro – Former secretary of planning for the state of Rondônia, accused of taking a bribe in relationship to the Santo Antônio hydroelectric plant on the Madeira River
- José Feliciano de Barros Júnior.

== Dilma Rousseff's 2014 presidential campaign ==
Marcelo Odebrecht detailed the payment of 100 million reals for the 2014 presidential campaign of Rousseff, requested by then-minister Guido Mantega. The payment was allegedly tied to the approval of Provisional Measure 613, which assisted Braskem, an arm of Odebrecht, and dealt with the Special Chemical Industry Regime (Reiq), and tax incentives to stimulate ethanol production. The former executive said that this was not a direct exchange of favors as was, he says, the negotiation of the 50 million reals passed on to the government for the creation of Crisis Refis to solve the crisis caused by zero Imposto sobre Produtos Industrializados ("Industrialized Products Tax"; IPI), but that the then-minister knew that he was talking to someone who had given money to João Santana. The former executive said he often met Mantega and they both brought their lawsuits to meetings. According to him, the former minister had already asked the executive to "resolve issues" pending with publicist João Santana and the then-treasurer of the PT, João Vaccari. The advertiser always feared political campaigns because of the risk of getting into debt at the end. That's why he made advance payment on the account, to keep it quiet.

Former Odebrecht Institutional Relations Director Alexandrino Alencar stated that former minister Edinho Silva, when he became treasurer of Dilma Rousseff's campaign in 2014, asked for two donations from five parties to support the Force of the People, at 7 million reals each. The PCdoB, PDT, PRB, PROS, and PP received the illegal donations, according to the former director of Odebrecht. Together, these parties gave three minutes and twenty seconds of television time to the presidential ticket. In return, said the former director, the contractor hoped to obtain quid pro quos from the elected government. The informant detailed meetings with the politicians in his office and cash deliveries, always made in kind by messengers to hotel rooms or flats. Marcelo Odebrecht said he met with Silva a few times to handle the money for the parties that would join the coalition in 2014. The former Dilma minister allegedly instructed Alencar to directly seek party leaders to pass on the values. He clarified that the interest of the PT was the increase of the time of electoral time on the television, being in a total of eleven minutes and twenty-four seconds, being a third of that time coming from the parties purchased.

== Repercussions outside Brazil ==
During the many years it has been going on, the Car Wash scandal has expanded from its original roots in money laundering, to encompass wider corruption in Brazil, and outside its borders in at least ten other countries, even beyond South America.

=== Paradise Papers ===
On 5 November 2017, the Paradise Papers, a set of confidential electronic documents relating to offshore investment, revealed that Odebrecht used at least one offshore company as a vehicle for paying the bribes uncovered through the Operation Car Wash investigation. Marcelo Odebrecht, his father Emílio Odebrecht and his brother Maurício Odebrecht are all mentioned in the Paradise Papers.

=== Argentina ===
During the governments of Cristina Fernández de Kirchner and Néstor Kirchner, Odebrecht was awarded overvalued contracts worth at least US$9.6 billion.

=== Mexico ===
In Mexico, the former director of the state-owned oil company Pemex, a close ally of President Enrique Peña Nieto, is suspected of receiving US$10 million in bribes from Odebrecht.

=== Panama ===
Ramón Fonseca Mora, president of Panama's Panameñista Party, was dismissed in March 2016 due to his involvement in the scandal. The Panama Papers resulted from a hack of his law firm's computer systems.

Fonseca and his business partner Jürgen Mossack were arrested and jailed in February 2017. They were released in April 2017 after a judge ruled they had cooperated with the investigation and ordered them each to pay $500,000 in bail.

=== Peru ===
During the Peruvian presidential election in February 2016, a report by the Brazilian Federal Police implicated President Ollanta Humala in bribery by Odebrecht for public works contracts. President Humala denied the charge and has avoided questions from the media on this matter. In July 2017, Humala and his wife were arrested and held in pre-trial detention following investigations into his involvement in the Odebrecht scandal. Investigations revealed that Brazilian president Lula da Silva pressured Odebrecht to pay millions of dollars toward Humala's presidential campaign.

In December 2017 Peru's President Pedro Pablo Kuczynski appeared before Congress to defend himself against impeachment over allegations of covering up illegal payments of $782,000 from Odebrecht to Kuczynski's company Westfield Group Capital Ltd. Keiko Fujimori, who had lost the 2016 presidential elections to Kuczynski by a margin of fewer than 50,000 votes, was championing impeachment; her party had already forced out five government ministers. Fujimori herself was later implicated in the Odebrecht scandal over alleged campaign contributions and on 31 October 2018, a judge sent her to 36 months of pretrial detention. Kuczynski resigned from the Presidency on 21 March 2018 and was sent to pretrial detention on 10 April 2019.

On 17 April 2019, Alan García, a former President of Peru who was also implicated in the scandal, died by suicide after shooting himself in the head while police attempted to arrest him.

Former president Alejandro Toledo (2001–2006) was also implicated in the bribery scandal, and was arrested in Redwood City, California in July 2019 for allegedly taking bribes in connection with a highway construction contract.

=== Venezuela ===
In late 2017, Euzenando Prazeres de Azevedo, president of Constructora Odebrecht in Venezuela, told investigators that Odebrecht had made $35 million in campaign contributions to Nicolas Maduro's 2013 presidential campaign in return for Odebrecht projects receiving priority in Venezuela, that Americo Mata, Maduro's campaign manager, initially asked for $50 million for Maduro, settled in the end for $35 million. In May 2018, Transparency International showed that only 9 of 33 projects started by Odebrecht in Venezuela between 1999 and 2013 were completed.

=== Singapore ===
One of Singapore's prominent government-linked companies, Keppel Corporation, is also implicated in the Petrobras' corruption scandals. Information of involvement is confirmed in the plea bargain Keppel Corporation reached with US DOJ. Keppel and US DOJ however failed to release the names of all people involved in this corruption scandal. Details are available on the US DOJ site here.

== Leaked conversations ==
On 9 June 2019, Glenn Greenwald and other journalists from investigative journalism magazine The Intercept Brasil started publishing several leaked chat messages exchanged via the Telegram app between members of the Brazilian judiciary system. Some, including then Car Wash judge and former Minister of Justice Sergio Moro and lead prosecutor Deltan Dallagnol are accused of violating legal procedure during the investigation, trial and arrest of former president Luiz Inácio Lula da Silva allegedly for the sake of preventing him from running for a third term in the 2018 Brazilian general election, among other crimes. Other news agencies, such as Folha de São Paulo and Veja, confirmed the authenticity of the messages and worked in partnership with The Intercept Brasil to sort the rest of the material in their possession before releasing it.

On 23 July, Brazilian Federal Police made public that they had arrested and were investigating a hacker from Araraquara, Walter Delgatti Neto, for breaking into the authorities' Telegram accounts. Neto confessed to the hack and to having given the chat logs to Greenwald. Police said the attack had been perpetrated by abusing Telegram's phone number verification and exploiting vulnerabilities in voicemail technology in use in Brazil using a spoofed phone number. The Intercept neither confirmed nor denied that Neto was their source and cited provisions for freedom of the press in the 1988 Brazilian Constitution.

Greenwald has faced death threats and homophobic harassment from supporters of President Jair Bolsonaro due to his reporting on the Telegram messages. A New York Times profile of Greenwald and his husband David Miranda, a left-wing congressman, said the couple have become targets of homophobia from Bolsonaro supporters as a result of the reporting. The Washington Post reported that Greenwald had been targeted with tax investigations by the Bolsonaro government as retaliation for the reporting, while AP called Greenwald's reporting the first test case for a free press in the Bolsonaro era.

The Guardian, reporting on retaliation against Greenwald from the Bolsonaro government and its supporters, said the articles published by Greenwald and The Intercept "have had an explosive impact on Brazilian politics and dominated headlines for weeks," adding that the exposés "appeared to show prosecutors in the sweeping Operation Car Wash corruption inquiry colluding with Sergio Moro, the judge who became a hero in Brazil for jailing powerful businessmen, middlemen and politicians."

After Bolsonaro explicitly threatened to imprison Greenwald for this reporting, Supreme Court justice Gilmar Mendes ruled that any investigation of Greenwald in connection with the reporting would be illegal under the Brazilian constitution, calling freedom of the press a "pillar of democracy".

Greenwald reported that the leaked file is bigger than the one in the Snowden case. Fernando Haddad considered the leaks to have the potential to become the "greatest institutional scandal in the history of the Brazilian republic".

In response to the leaks, several top jurisprudence authorities and experts in Europe and the Americas, such as Susan Rose-Ackerman (praised by Car Wash prosecutor Deltan Dallagnol as the world's top corruption expert), Bruce Ackerman, and Luigi Ferrajoli, voiced their shock at the conduct of the Brazilian authorities and described former President Lula as a political prisoner, calling for his release.

In March 2020, the Intercept reported that Brazilian prosecutors had secretly collaborated with the US Department of Justice and Federal Bureau of Investigation in a manner "that may have violated international legal treaties and Brazilian law". The Brazilian Ministry of Justice had not been informed; making this collaboration illegal. They also found that money paid by Brazilian companies in the US was funnelled back into Brazil; chief prosecutor Deltan Dallagnol said he would use part of this sum to set up an "independent fund to fight corruption". This attempt was then deemed unconstitutional by Brazil's Supreme Court. It was reported that Mr. Dallagnol had called Lula da Silva's arrest "a gift from the CIA". Leslie Backschies, the head of the US FBI's international corruption unit, alluded to this incident when discussing the sensitivity of anti-corruption investigations in a 2019 interview with AP news, saying "We saw presidents toppled in Brazil".

== Winding down ==
As of September 2020, there were fears that political forces were about to bring an end to Operation Car Wash, according to prosecutors in Brazil. Chief prosecutor Deltan Dallagnol said, "Today there is a very strong alignment of political forces against the Operation Car Wash investigation. Much more than [just] an operation, the Brazilian effort against corruption itself is at risk." One of the reasons Jair Bolsonaro was elected president in 2018, was because of his promises to attack corruption, but since he and his family members became embroiled, he has cooled on it. Bolsonaro's attorney general Augusto Aras complained that the investigations went too far, and were biased politically, and campaigned against it, gaining support from Bolsonaro family members such as their son Flavio who was caught up in it. Dallagnol claimed that the slowdown and efforts to stop the investigations were because the investigations were getting close to revealing corruption at the highest levels. Other branches of government also oppose the investigations, including Congress and the Supreme Court, which have been targets, as well as political parties. Analysts see a concerted effort to back down from aggressive anti-corruption efforts in Brazil.

== In popular culture ==
Dramatizations of Operation Car Wash include the 2017 film Polícia Federal: A Lei É para Todos (Federal Police: The Law Is for Everyone) directed by Marcelo Antunez and Netflix series The Mechanism (2018–2019).

== See also ==
- Brazilian Anti-Corruption Act
- Impeachment of Dilma Rousseff
- Impeachment proposals against Michel Temer
- List of scandals in Brazil
- Mani pulite, Italian judicial investigation into political corruption
- Odebrecht–Car Wash leniency agreement
- Odebrecht Case
- Offshoots of Operation Car Wash
- Offshoots of Operation Car Wash outside Brazil
- Phases of Operation Car Wash
- Vaza Jato ("Car Wash Leaks")
