= 2014 Rio Grande do Norte gubernatorial election =

2014 Rio Grande do Norte Gubernatorial Election
- October 5, 2014
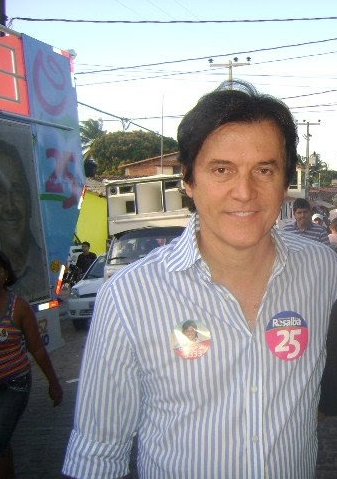

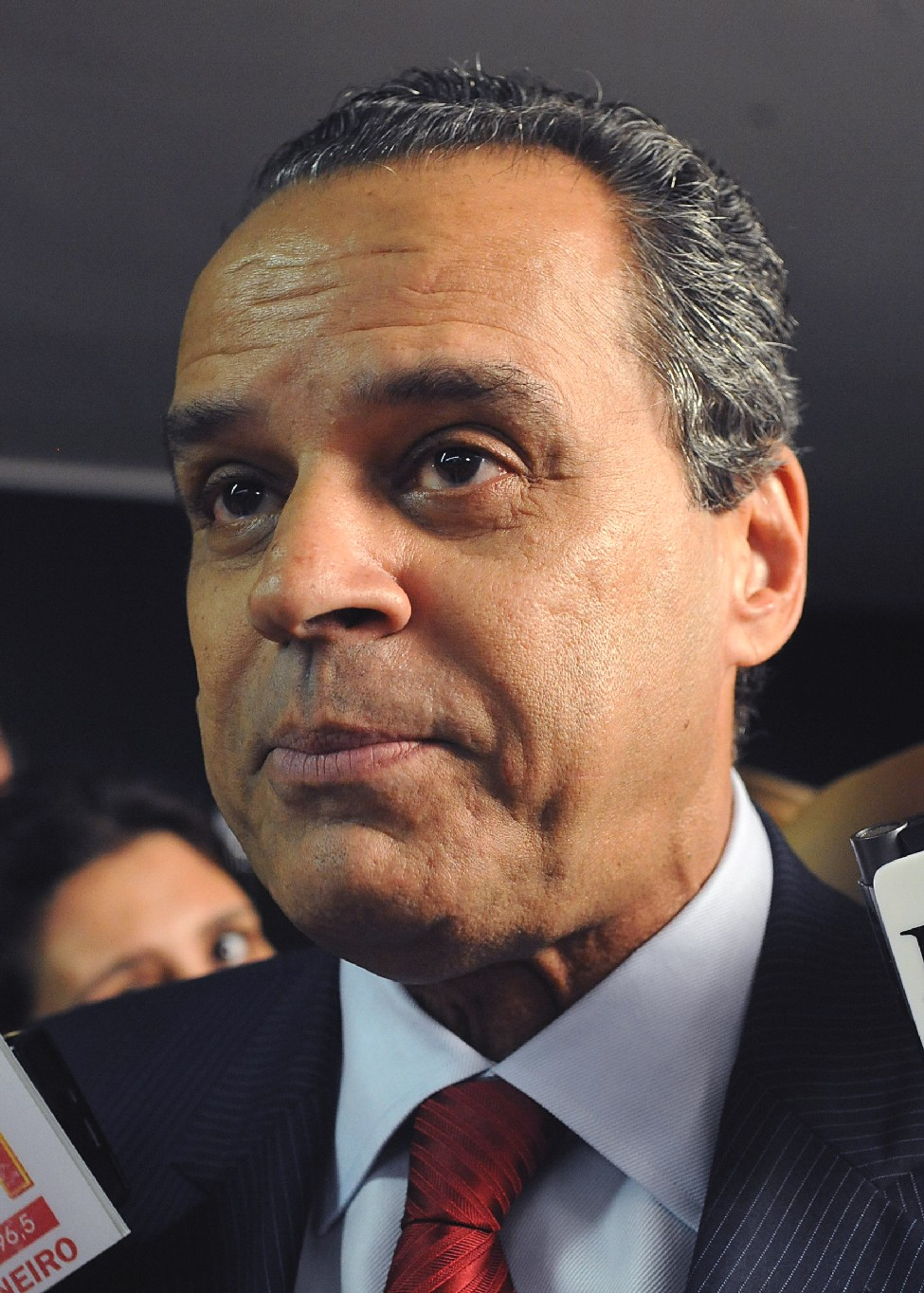
Nominee	Robinson Faria	Henrique Eduardo Alves
Party	PSD	MDB
Running mate	Fábio Dantas	João Maia
Popular vote	877.286	734.801
Percentage	54,42%	45,58%
Governor before election
Rosalba Ciarlini
DEM
Elected Governor
Robinson Faria
PSD

The Rio Grande do Norte gubernatorial election was held on 5 October 2014 to elect the governor of Rio Grande do Norte.

Incumbent Governor Rosalba Ciarlini sought nomination for a second term, but her candidacy was vetoed by her party due to her low approval ratings.

Robinson Faria was announced as the victor with 54,38% of the vote, who had been elected as Vice-Governor in 2010 alongside Governor Ciarlini.

Following the election, Henrique Alves returned to his duties in the Chamber of Deputies.

== Candidates ==
Candidate	Running mate	Coalition
Henrique Eduardo Alves; PMDB	João Maia; PR	"União pela Mudança" (PMDB, PR, PSB, DEM, PSDB, SD, PROS, PDT, PPS, PTB, PRB, PSC, PV, PHS, PMN, PSDC, PRP, PTN)
Simone Dutra; PSTU	Socorro Ribeiro; PSTU	-
Araken Dantas; PSL	Paulo Roberto; PSL	-
Robério Paulino; PSOL	Ronaldo Garcia; PSOL	-
Robinson Faria; PSD	Fábio Dantas; PCdoB	"Liderados pelo Povo" (PSD, PCdoB, PT, PP, PTC, PEN, PRTB, PPL, PTdoB)
