= Pinato =

Pinato is an Italian surname. Notable people with the surname include:

- Davide Pinato (born 1964), Italian footballer and coach
- Fausto Pinato (born 1977), Brazilian politician and lawyer
- Marco Pinato (born 1995), Italian footballer
