= Görgen =

Görgen is a surname. Notable people with the surname include:

- Sérgio Görgen (1954–2026), Brazilian politician
- Zafer Görgen (born 2000), Turkish footballer
