= Fausto Pinato =

Brazilian politician

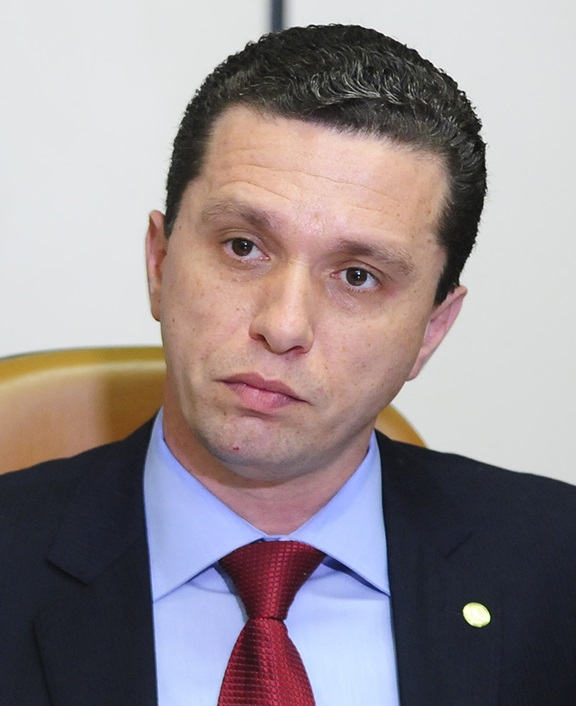
- Pinato in November 2015

Federal Deputy for São Paulo
- Incumbent
- Assumed office 1 February 2015

Chair of Chamber Agriculture, Livestock, Supply and Rural Development Committee
- Incumbent
- Assumed office 13 March 2019
- Preceded by: Afonso Hamm

Personal details
- Born: Fausto Ruy Pinato; 1 June 1977 (age 49) Fernandópolis, São Paulo, Brazil
- Party: PP (2016–present)
- Other political affiliations: PRB (2013–2016)

Fausto Ruy Pinato (born 1 June 1977) is a Brazilian politician and lawyer. He has dedicated his political career representing São Paulo and has served as a federal deputy representative since 2015.

== Personal life ==
He was a lawyer before entering politics. His brother, Gustavo Pinato, is a member of the São Paulo State Senate, serving as a councilman representing Fernandópolis. He is affiliated with the Christian Congregation in Brazil and is a musician in the church.

== Political career ==
Pinato was elected as a federal deputy of São Paulo in 2014, with the endorsement of his predecessor Celso Russomanno as the candidate for the Brazil Republican party. Pinato was investigated during Operation Car Wash for allegedly taking R$ 117 thousand in bribes from Brazilian company Queiroz Galvão during his election campaign. Pinato was initially part of an ethics committee investigation into Eduardo Cunha, but he resigned early on due to switching his party allegiance from the PRB to the PP.

Pinato voted in favor of the impeachment against then-president Dilma Rousseff and political reformation. He would later vote in against opening a corruption investigation against Rousseff's successor Michel Temer, and voted in favor of the 2017 Brazilian labor reforms.

Chamber of Deputies (Brazil)
Preceded by Afonso Hamm	Chair of Chamber Agriculture, Livestock, Supply and Rural Development Committee; 2019–present	Incumbent
