= Edvaldo Brito =

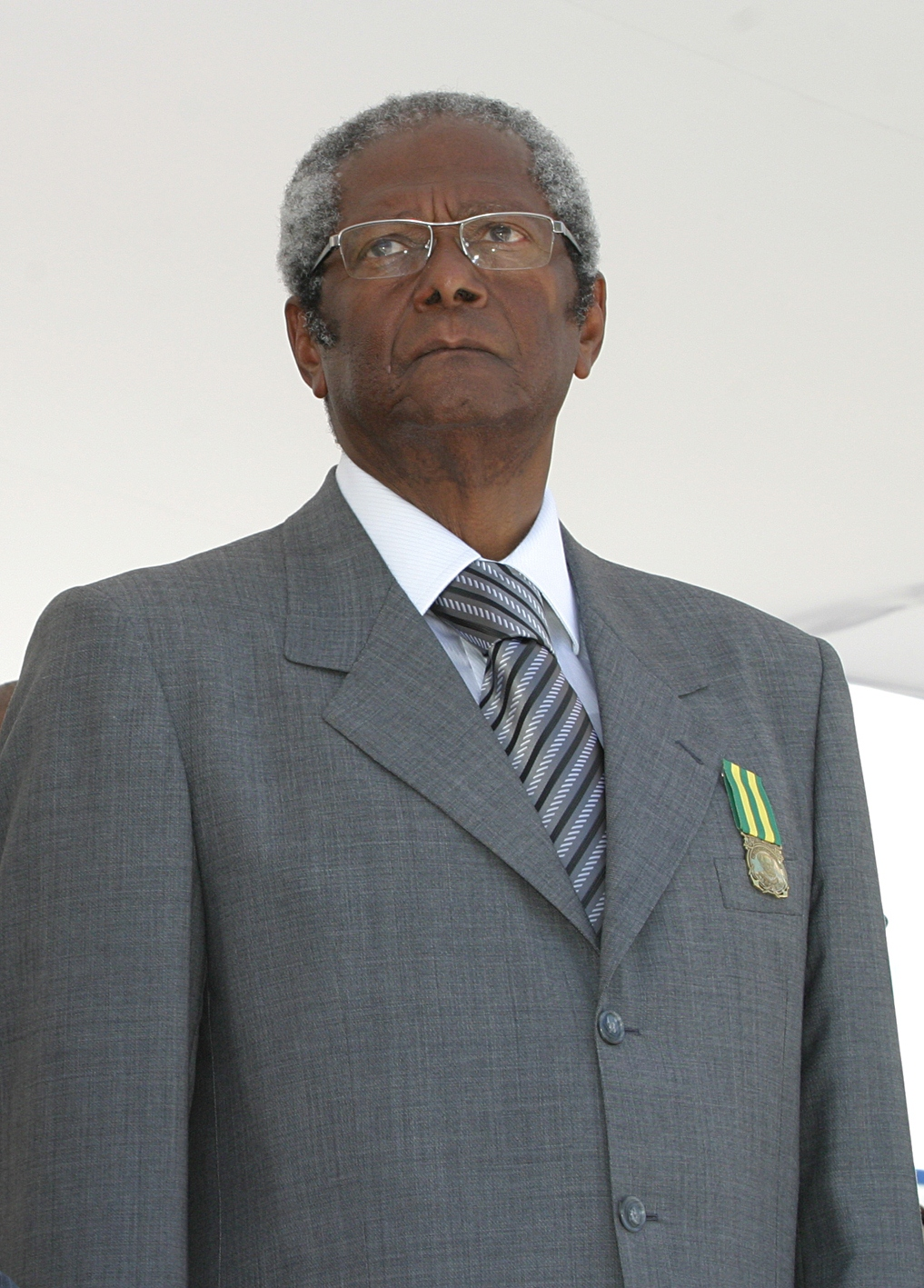
- Brito in 2012

Councilman of Salvador
- In office 1 February 2013 – 1 February 2025

State Secretary of Strategic Subjects of Bahia
- In office 2014–2014
- Governor: Jaques Wagner

Vice-mayor of Salvador
- In office 1 January 2009 – 1 January 2013
- Preceded by: Marcelo Duarte
- Succeeded by: Célia Sacramento

Mayor of Salvador
- In office August 1978 – March 1979
- Preceded by: David Mendes Pereira
- Succeeded by: Mário Kertész

Municipal Secretary of Juridical Matters of São Paulo
- In office 1 January 1997 – 1 January 2001

State Secretary of Justice of Bahia
- In office 1977–1978
- Governor: Roberto Santos

State Secretary of Education and Culture of Bahia
- In office 1967–1970
- Governor: Luís Viana Filho

State Secretary of Health of Bahia
- In office 1962–1963
- Governor: Juracy Magalhães

Personal details
- Born: Edvaldo Pereira de Brito; 3 October 1937 (age 89) Muritiba, Bahia, Brazil
- Party: PTB (1985–2016); PSD (2016–present)
- Spouse: Reginalda Brito
- Children: Antonio Brito
- Education: Faculdade de Olinda

Edvaldo Pereira de Brito (born 3 October 1937) is a Brazilian professor, tax lawyer, jurist, and politician. He is currently affiliated with the Social Democratic Party (PSD). He is a doctor and senior lecturer of law at the University of São Paulo, as well as a professor emeritus at the Federal University of Bahia and at Mackenzie Presbyterian University. He is a permanent member of the Academia de Letras da Bahia, occupying seat number 3.

He was the mayor of the city of Salvador from 1978 to 1979, and later was vice-mayor from 2009 and 2012 and city councilor from 2013 to 2025. He was also State Secretary for Justice, Education, Health, and Strategic Subjects of the state of Bahia, along with becoming the Secretary of Juridical Matters of the City of São Paulo.

In 2003, he was set to be chosen by President Luiz Inácio Lula da Silva to be nominated to become a Justice of the Brazilian Supreme Federal Court, but his nomination was impeded due to him having already turned 65 year old, the maximum age for Supreme Court positions as outlined by the Brazilian Constitution.

== Biography ==
Brito was born on 3 October 1937 in Muritiba, Bahia. He grew up in the Recôncavo Baiano region, where he had a humble childhood, the son of mason João Sobrinho and clothes washer Edite. Edvaldo credits his mother as a great inspiration for his life, where her advice was instrumental in him being able to continue on his career. He is the father of lawyer Edvaldo Filho and federal deputy Antonio Brito. He has 5 grandchildren and is married to Civil Rights professor Reginalda Paranhos de Brito.

== Juridical and academic career ==
In 1962, Brito graduated with a law degree from the Federal University of Bahia (UFBA), where he was the president of the Centro Acadêmico Ruy Barbosa and where he was a student of prominent jurists at the time, such as Aliomar Baleeiro, Josaphat Marinho, and Orlando Gomes, of whom he is considered an academic and cultural disciple.

Under the advisory of Baleeiro, Brito went into academia in 1974, when he was selected from an array of candidates and was selected to be a professor at the Department of Public Law with the Federal University of Bahia's Faculty of Law with the thesis "Juridical Problems of the ICM".

In 1980, under the advisory of Gomes, he obtained a Masters of Law at UFBA, with his dissertation titled “Economic Development and the Fiscal and Tax Systems”. In 2010, he became a professor emeritus at UFBA, currently serving as the Dean of the Faculty of Law.

While in São Paulo, Brito earned his doctorate in law from the University of São Paulo (USP) in 1997, defending his thesis "The Concept of Taxes". He also obtained, while at USP, the title of senior lecturer in 1998 and was approved for two competitions to which he entered, one to become the Titular Professor of Civil Law and the other for Titular Professor of Tax Legislation at the Law School of the University of São Paulo. Around this time, he was also named the Municipal Secretary of Juridical Matters by the mayor of São Paulo Celso Pitta (PPB).

He was, for almost 20 years, a professor of Civil Law at the Mackenzie Presbyterian University where he became professor emeritus in 2003.

He is a member of Academias de Letras, including in the following: Academia Brasileira de Letras Jurídicas; Academia de Letras da Bahia; Academia Internacional de Direito e Economia; Academia Brasileira de Direito Tributário; Academia Nacional de Economia; Academia de Letras Jurídicas da Bahia; Academia Paulista de Letras Jurídicas, Academia de Letras de Ilhéus.

He is also an updater of the works of Orlando Gomes, which includes Introdução ao Direito Civil (in collaboration with Reginalda Paranhos de Brito); Obrigações, Contratos (in collaboration with Reginalda Paranhos de Brito), and Responsabilidade Civil.

He currently is an active professional at his law office and is a professor of Master's and Doctorate courses in law at UFBA; He lectures, in different semesters, the Philosophy of Law, the General Theory of Law, Constitutional Jurisdiction, Tax Law, and Special Topics of State Law.

== Political career ==
At the beginning of his public life, Brito participated in the state governments of Juracy Magalhães, Luís Viana Filho, and Roberto Santos, having been the State Secretary for Education, Health, and Justice.

Between August 1978 and April 1979, he was named the mayor of Salvador by governor Santos after an indirect election in the Legislative Assembly of Bahia, despite not being part of the group led by Antônio Carlos Magalhães. He was succeeded by Mário Kertész.

He became a candidate for the mayoralty of Salvador in 1985 as a member of the PTB, with the support of the then-governor of the state João Durval Carneiro, but lost the election to Kertész.

In 1986, he became a candidate for a Constituent Federal Deputy, and was elected as a substitute. He actively participated in the Brazilian Constituent Assembly, being invited to participate in the creation of the Brazilian tax system as laid out in the 1988 Constitution alongsideIves Gandra Martins and José Souto Maior Borges (v. Diário da Assembleia Nacional Constituinte, Supl.85, ed. 27 June 1987, pp.82 e segs.). He was part of the Notables Commission that assessed the preparation of the Constitution of the State of Bahia, released on 5 October 1989. He was again a candidate for the Chamber of Deputies in 1990, but without success.

In 1996, he was named the Municipal Secretary of Juridical Matters in São Paulo during the administration of Celso Pitta, completing a campaign promise to nominate more Black people to positions of power to his government. With Pitta being removed from the mayoralty, Brito was a witness in his impeachment trial, which did not lead to Pitta's impeachment. At the end of May 2000, however, a judicial decision by the Superior Court of Justice allowed for Pitta to return to his position on 13 June 2000. Brito decisively worked alongside Pitta's lawyers, among them the renowned defense lawyer Antônio Cláudio Mariz de Oliveira.

Brito returned to public life as he was elected as the vice-mayor for the ticket led by Salvador's mayor João Henrique Carneiro, who was running for reelection. He worked in the vice-mayoralty as a coordinator of various projects, including as the coordinator for Salvador's Carnaval from 2010 to 2012. During Carneiro's mayoralty, however, he had been removed from his position by the administration.

In 2010, he became a candidate for Senator in Bahia as part of the "A Bahia Tem Pressa" (PTB/PMDB/PTN/PSC/PR/PPS/PSDC/PRTB/PMN/PTC/PRP/PT do B) coalition. He came in 6th place with 810,261 votes and was not elected.

In 2012, as a member of the PTB, he initially ran as a candidate to become the mayor of Salvador, but eventually supported the PT candidate Nelson Pelegrino. He was elected as a city councilor in Salvador, but resigned in 2014 to become the State Secretary of Strategic Subjects as part of the Jaques Wagner government.

In 2016, together with his son, federal deputy Antonio Brito, Brito became a member of the PSD, being reelected to the city council, where he was designated as the one leading the modernization and new composition of the Interim Regiment, as well as the Organic Law of the Municipality. He is also the author of the proposal, which became law, dealing with the tax revenue on abandoned buildings.

After three terms as a city councilor, Brito opted to not run for reelection in 2024, but still remained as the president of the municipal branch of the PSD in Salvador.

== Bibliography ==
=== Books ===
- BRITO, Edvaldo. Opiniões jurídicas. Salvador, BA: [s.n.], 1974.
- BRITO, Edvaldo. Problemas jurídicos do ICM. Salvador, BA Ed. LJF, 1974
- BRITO, Edvaldo. Reflexos jurídicos da atuação do Estado no domínio econômico: (desenvolvimento econômico, bem-estar social). São Paulo, SP: Saraiva, 1982. 2ª edição, 2016. 3ª edição, 2022.
- BRITO, Edvaldo. Limites da revisão constitucional. Porto Alegre: Sérgio Antonio Fabris, 1993.
- BRITO, Edvaldo; ROSAS, Roberto. Dimensão jurídica do tributo: homenagem ao professor Dejalma de Campos. São Paulo, SP: Meio Jurídico, 2003.
- BRITO, Edvaldo. Direito tributário: imposto, tributos sinalagmáticos, contribuições, preços e tarifas, empréstimo compulsório. São Paulo, SP: Atlas, 2015.
- BRITO, Edvaldo. Direito tributário e constituição: estudos e pareceres. São Paulo, SP: Atlas, 2016
- BRITO, Edvaldo. O contrato com pessoa a declarar, no Brasil, é um pacto: transversalidade entre Direito Privado e Direito Tributário. São Paulo, SP: Noeses, 2023.
- BRITO, Edvaldo. Decadência e prescrição tributárias no Direito brasileiro. São Paulo, SP: Noeses, 2024.
- BRITO, Edvaldo. Estudos sobre jurisdição constitucional comparada - I. Salvador: EDUFBA, 2024.

=== Articles ===
- BRITO, Edvaldo. O imposto sobre serviços (ISS) e os 'Apart-Service' condominais. Revista Ângulos, Salvador, n. 19, p.144-151, jan. 1988.
- BRITO, Edvaldo. A tributação no império. Revista dos Mestrandos em Direito Econômico da UFBA, Salvador, BA, n. 4, jul. 1993.
- BRITO, Edvaldo. Aspectos jurídicos da democracia participativa como uma revisão do processo decisório. Revista da Faculdade de Direito da UFBA, Salvador, v. 36, jan. 1996.
- BRITO, Edvaldo. Perda da propriedade para o Estado. Revista Brasileira de Direito Comparado, Rio de Janeiro, dez. 2009.
- BRITO, Edvaldo. ICMS, crédito fiscal: direito subjetivo público do consumidor e os efeitos dos incentivos fiscais. Direito Tributário em Questão: revista da FESDT, Porto Alegre, n. 5, jan. 2010.
- BRITO, Edvaldo. 30 anos da Constituição federal: avanços e retrocessos em interpretação tendências para o futuro. Revista da Academia de Letras Jurídicas da Bahia, Salvador, BA, v. 21, n. 23, jan. 2018.
- BRITO, Edvaldo. A responsabilidade civil no atual direito positivo brasileiro. Revista dos Tribunais, São Paulo, SP, Ano 107, vol.997, nov.2018.
