= Srour =

Srour is a surname. Notable people with the surname include:

- Ali Srour (born 1994), Lebanese-Norwegian boxer
- Bashar Srour (born 1972), Syrian footballer
- Heiny Srour (born 1945), Lebanese film director
- Mohamed Srour (born 1986), Egyptian gymnast
- Raul Henrique Srour (born 1961), Brazilian businessman
- Saad Hayel Srour (born 1947), Jordanian politician
