= Tânia Martins =

Afro-Brazilian poet

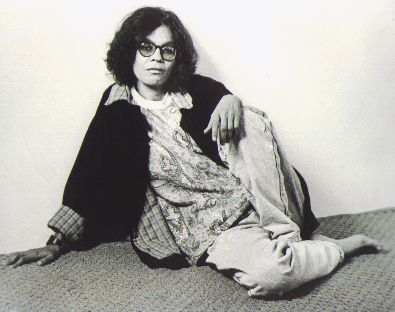
Tânia Martins (c. 1990)

Tânia Martins (née Elvira Tânia Lopes Martins; born January 23, 1957) is an Afro-Brazilian poet.

== Biography ==
Elvira Tânia Lopes Martins was born in Licínio de Almeida, Bahia, on January 23, 1957. Her parents are Edvardes Santana Martins and Ana Evangelina Lopes Martins. Since the 1970s, she is based in Caetité, Bahia.

Martins attended primary school in Licínio de Almeida, coming to Caetité, a city with a centuries-old educational tradition, to study at the intermediate level. From the age of eleven, she began to versify, and recited her works on civic dates and solemn ceremonies of her homeland. In Caetité, she published her first poem, "Sou" (I am), in the Universidade Salvador newspaper, O Shalom. Majoring in Education, she obtained her bachelor's degree in 1975.

Returning to the district where she was born, Martins taught until 1985. There, she helped in the founding of the "Centro Educacional Cenecista Padre Anchieta", of which she became deputy director. In 1986, she returned to Caetité, for family reasons. She taught for a brief period at the "Instituto de Educação Anísio Teixeira" (IEAT), and in the "G. E. Monsenhor Bastos". Martins began to publish her poems in the Tribuna do Sertão newspapers, O Tibagi (in Telêmaco Borba, Paraná) and O Impacto (in Vitória da Conquista, Bahia). Starting in the 1990s, she published her poetry in the newspaper Imagem, and also did some writing and editing work for the publication.

In 1993, she released his first book of poems, Folha Solta, with the support of Francisco Adauto R. Prates. In this poetry collection, she gathered some of the poems written throughout her life. In August 2000, she published the book Velas, which was adopted as a para-didactic book for educational activities in the city of Caetité. In 2002, she released her third book of poetry, Questão de Escolha, exposing the maturity of her lyrical voice.

For years, she made plans to create an academy of letters in Caetité. In 2001, with others, it was finally established. She was seated in Chair Number 3 at the "Academia Caetiteense de Letras", whose patron is the educator Anísio Teixeira, joining its first board as secretary. There, she also works in the editorial secretariat, which includes the magazine Selecta Acadêmica, writing verses and editing. In October of the same year, she participated in the production of the book alhos e Retalhos, by the Municipal Department of Education, a pioneering work in the dissemination and encouragement of the art of writing in the public schools of Caetité. In 2005, after almost four years of work, she led in the development of the first edition of the collective book of the "Academia Caetiteense", entitled Broto.

== Selected works ==
- Folha Solta, 1993
- Velas, 2000
- Questão de Escolha, 2002
- Verso Natural, 2004
- Pura Beleza, 2004
- O Medo e a Ternura, 2005
