= Iberê Ferreira =

Brazilian politician (1944–2014)

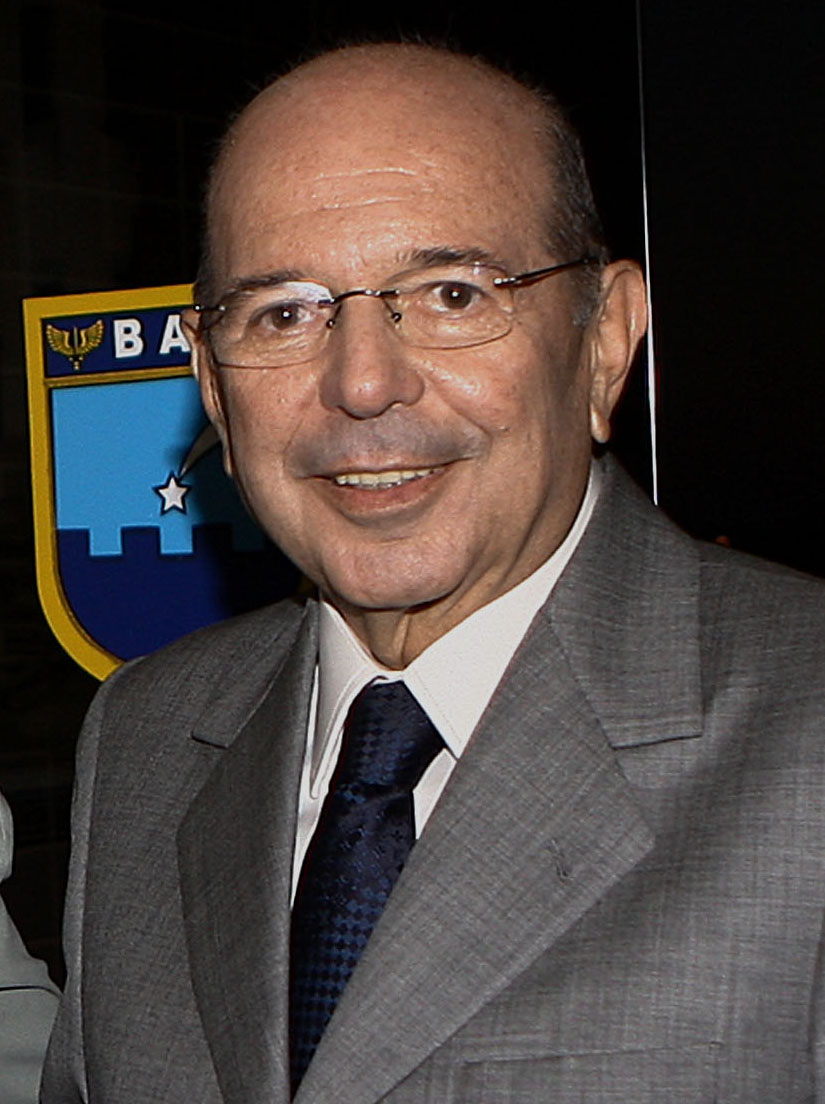

Governor of Rio Grande do Norte
- In office January 1, 2007 – January 1, 2011
- Preceded by: Wilma Maria de Faria
- Succeeded by: Rosalba Ciarlini

Vice Governor of Rio Grande do Norte
- In office January 1, 2007 – March 30, 2010
- Preceded by: Antônio Jácome
- Succeeded by: Robinson Faria

Personal details
- Born: February 27, 1944; Natal, Rio Grande do Norte, Brazil
- Died: September 13, 2014 (aged 70); São Paulo, Brazil
- Political party: PSB
- Spouse: Celina Maia Ferreira de Souza

Iberê Paiva Ferreira de Souza (February 27, 1944 – September 13, 2014) was a Brazilian politician and lawyer. Ferreira served as the Governor of Rio Grande do Norte from March 31, 2010, until January 1, 2011, as well as the Vice Governor of Rio Grande do Norte from January 1, 2007, until March 30, 2010. He also held office as a federal deputy in the Chamber of Deputies for five terms from 1987 until 2006 and a member of the Rio Grande do Norte state legislature from 1971 to 1979.

He studied law at the Universidade Federal do Rio Grande do Norte (UFRN) and business law at Fundação Getúlio Vargas in Rio de Janeiro. Ferreira entered politics in 1970, when he was elected to the Rio Grande do Norte state legislature as a member of the now defunct Brazilian Democratic Movement (MDB).

He was elected Vice Governor of Rio Grander do Norte in 2006 and took office on January 1, 2007. Ferreira became Governor of Rio Grande do Norte in March 2010 following the departure of Governor Wilma Maria de Faria, who resigned from office to run for the Federal Senate. Ferreira ran for the remainder of the term later in 2010, but was defeated in the Rio Grande do Norte gubernatorial election. His opponent, Rosalba Ciarlini of the DEM, won the election with 52.46% to win the first round outright, with Governor Ferreira placed second with 36.25% of the vote. He largely retired from politics after leaving office on January 1, 2011.

Iberê Ferreira died from complications of cancer at Hospital Sírio-Libanês in São Paulo on September 13, 2014, at the age of 70. He had been diagnosed with cancer in 2010. He had also been hospitalized on June 2, 2014, for bacterial meningitis.

Political offices
Preceded by Wilma Maria de Faria	Governor of Rio Grande do Norte; 2010–2011	Succeeded by Rosalba Ciarlini
