= Sérgio Görgen =

Brazilian politician (1954–2026)

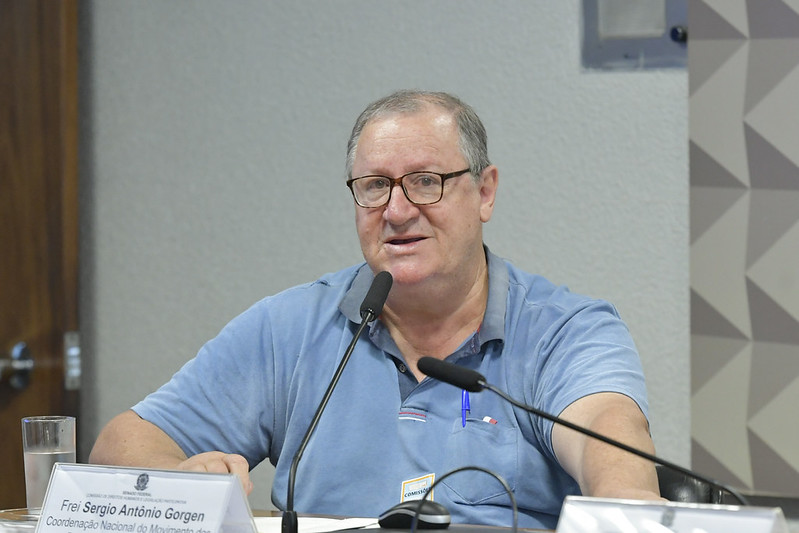
- Görgen in 2024

Member of the Legislative Assembly of Rio Grande do Sul
- In office 1 February 2003 – 31 January 2007

Personal details
- Born: Sérgio Antonio Görgen; 29 January 1954 Não-Me-Toque, Rio Grande do Sul, Brazil
- Died: 3 February 2026 (aged 72) Hulha Negra, Rio Grande do Sul, Brazil
- Party: PT
- Occupation: Priest

Sérgio Antonio Görgen (29 January 1954 – 3 February 2026) was a Brazilian politician. A member of the Workers' Party, he served in the Legislative Assembly of Rio Grande do Sul from 2003 to 2007.

Görgen died of a heart attack in Hulha Negra, on 3 February 2026, at the age of 72.
