= Jutahy Magalhães =

Brazilian politician

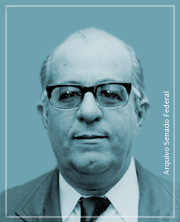

Councillor of Itaparica
- In office 1959–1963

State Representative for Bahia
- In office 1963–1967

14th President of the Legislative Assembly of Bahia
- In office 1965–1967
- Preceded by: Orlando Spinola
- Succeeded by: Sacramento Neto

Vice Governor for Bahia
- In office 1967–1971
- Governor: Luís Viana Filho
- Preceded by: Orlando Moscoso
- Succeeded by: Menandro Minahim

Federal Deputy for Bahia
- In office 1975–1979

Senator from Bahia
- In office 1979–1995
- Preceded by: Hector Dias
- Succeeded by: Waldeck Ornelas

Personal details
- Born: August 6, 1929 Rio de Janeiro, Brazil
- Died: January 31, 2000 (aged 70) Salvador, Bahia, Brazil
- Spouse: Mercedes Carvalho Brito Magalhães
- Children: Jutahy Júnior
- Parents: Mother: Lavínia Borges Magalhães; Father: Juracy Magalhães

Jutahy Borges Magalhães (Rio de Janeiro, August 6, 1929, Salvador – January 31, 2000) was a Brazilian politician.

== Political career ==
The son of the politician Juracy Magalhães, from an early age he suffered paternal influence and joined the UDN, a party of which his father was one of the leaders and founders. Elected city councilor in Salvador in 1958 and state deputy in 1962, he was anointed vice-governor of Bahia during Luís Viana Filho's term in office (1967–1971) when he was already a member of ARENA. Re-elected state deputy in 1970 and elected federal deputy in 1974. In 1978 he was nominated for the vacancy of "bionic senator" reserved for his state having migrated to the hosts of the PDS with the party reform undertaken with the end of bipartisanship. The cycle of military governments with the election of Tancredo Neves as President of the Republic in 1985, Magalhães joined the PMDB and was re-elected senator in 1986 in an election marked by the victory of Waldir Pires to the government. This fact, however, did not prevent him from changing his party affiliation to the PSDB a few years later.

A civil servant working at the Bahia State Server Assistance and Welfare Institute (IAPSEB), he was inspector general of the State Welfare and Assistance Institute (IPASE) for Bahia, Sergipe and Espírito Santo. Later he lived abroad and was a student at the University of Washington where he studied Public and Commercial Administration.

His son, Jutahy Magalhães Júnior, has been in political activity for more than thirty years; being elected federal deputy seven times, Minister of Social Welfare (1992–1993) and candidate for governor of Bahia in 1994.
