= Antonio Brito =

Brazilian politician

- Brito in 2019

Member of the Chamber of Deputies
- Incumbent
- Assumed office 1 February 2011
- Constituency: Bahia

Personal details
- Born: Antonio Luiz Paranhos Ribeiro Leite de Brito; 17 January 1969 (age 57) Salvador, Bahia, Brazil
- Party: PSD (2016–present)
- Other political affiliations: PTB (1999–2016)
- Parent: Edvaldo Brito (father)
- Education: Universidade Salvador
- Profession: Business administrator

Antonio Luiz Paranhos Ribeiro Leite de Brito, or simply Antonio Brito (born 17 January 1969) is a Brazilian business administrator and politician, member of the Social Democratic Party (PSD). He is a federal deputy for Bahia and former president of the Conselho Nacional de Assistência Social (CNAS).

He is the leader of the PSD in the Chamber of Deputies. He was also president of the Social Security and Family Committee three times (2015, 2019 and 2020), the second largest committee in the Chamber at the time, in terms of number of deputies. He chairs the Brazil–Portugal Parliamentary Group, as well as coordinating the Parliamentary Front to Support for Santa Casa da Misericórdia, Hospitals and Philanthropic Entities and the Parliamentary Front to Fight Tuberculosis.

He is the son of the jurist, former mayor and former councilor of Salvador, Edvaldo Brito.

== Biography ==
=== Early years and education ===
Born in Salvador, capital of the state of Bahia, Antonio Brito graduated in Business Administration from the Universidade Salvador in 1990. He then moved to Rio de Janeiro to study at Universidade Gama Filho in 1993, where he specialized in Economic and Financial Auditing.

=== Work ===
Since the 1990s, he has served on the management boards of government institutions and the executive committees of representative bodies for Santas Casas and philanthropic hospitals. His roles include: President of the Municipal Council of Social Assistance of Salvador (1996-2000); President of the Union of Santas Casas and Philanthropic Entities of Bahia (1999-2002); President of the National Council of Social Assistance (2001-2003); Member of the university council of the Federal University of Bahia (2003-2005); Member of the Management Conselho Nacional de Assistência Social (2004-2006); President of the Federation of Santas Casas de Misericórdia, Hospitals, and Philanthropic Entities of Bahia (2004-2010); Member of the State Health Council of Bahia (2005-2008); President of the National Confederation of Santas Casas de Misericórdia, Hospitals, and Philanthropic Entities (2005-2011); Member of the Municipal Health Council of Salvador (2006-2008); Member of the National Health Council (2008); and President of the International Confederation of Misericórdias (2012-2015).

== Politics ==
Between 2009 and 2010, he took on the role of Secretary of Labor, Social Assistance and Citizen's Rights at Salvador City Hall. In 2010, he was elected Federal Deputy by the Brazilian Labour Party (PTB), standing for re-election in 2014. In 2016, he left the PTB and joined the Social Democratic Party (PSD), at the invitation of Otto Alencar. As a member of parliament, he voted against the impeachment of Dilma Rousseff.

Affiliated to the PSD, he was elected to office again in 2018 and 2022. He became leader of the PSD in the Chamber. In the 2025 President of the Chamber of Deputies of Brazil election, his name was widely rumored to be in the running for president of the Chamber of Deputies. He withdrew his candidacy to support Hugo Motta, the candidate supported by Arthur Lira. In the 2026 election, he sought another term and was elected after receiving more than 200,000 votes, placing second in the vote count behind only Pastor Sargento Isidório (Avante).

=== Odebrecht ===
An article published on the G1 news portal indicates that in 2010 the congressman received 100,000 reais from the Odebrecht company for his campaign, through the construction company's computerized payment system, and that he was codenamed “Misericórdia” on the company's list of bribes. However, after the Supreme Federal Court (STF) opened an inquiry and more than a year of investigation, the Public Prosecutor's Office (MP) concluded that the complaint should be dropped because there was no material evidence of the company receiving unaccounted for funds in the 2010 election campaign.
