= João Maia (politician) =

Brazilian politician (1941–2024)

Member of the Chamber of Deputies of Brazil for Acre
- In office 6 October 1988 – 21 May 1997

Personal details
- Born: João Maia da Silva Filho; 4 November 1941 Santa Branca, São Paulo, Brazil
- Died: 1 March 2024 (aged 82) Rio Branco, Acre, Brazil
- Political party: PT; MDB; PP; PSDB; PFL
- Education: Université de Montréal
- Occupation: Philosopher

João Maia da Silva Filho (4 November 1941 – 1 March 2024) was a Brazilian philosopher and politician. A member of several political parties, he served in the Chamber of Deputies from 1988 to 1997.

Maia died in Rio Branco on 1 March 2024, at the age of 82.
