= Universidade Salvador =

Private university in Salvador, Brazil

Universidade Salvador (UNIFACS)
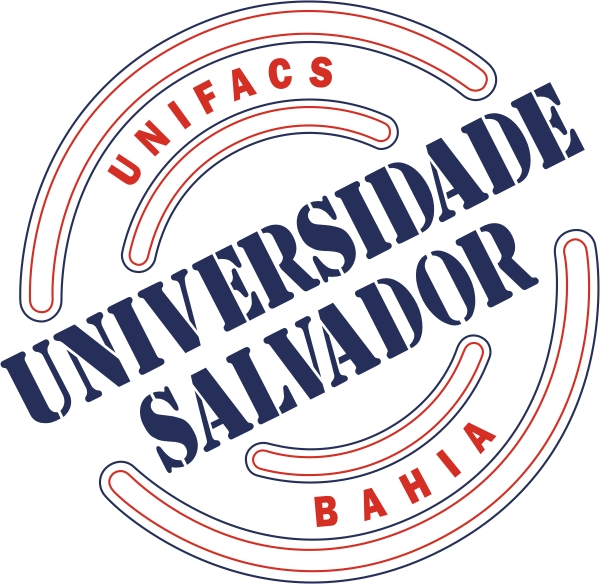
- Type: University
- Established: 1972
- Dean: Manuel Joaquim Fernandes de Barros Sobrinho
- Location: Salvador, Bahia, Brazil
- Affiliations: Laureate International Universities
- Website: https://www.unifacs.br

Universidade Salvador (UNIFACS) is a university in the city of Salvador, state of Bahia in the northeast of Brazil. It was founded on 1972 as "Escola de Administração de Empresas da Bahia" (Business school of Bahia), later changed to FACS (Faculdade Salvador), and on 1997 when it became a university, to UNIFACS (Universidade Salvador).

UNIFACS is the biggest private university on Salvador and offers graduate programs that mostly vary from 4 to 5 years and post-graduate programs. UNIFACS has also been a pioneer in the state of Bahia, being the first to offer distance education and short (2-year) technological courses.

UNIFACS is ranked 71st in Brazil and 3258th globally by Unirank.

== Graduation programs ==
UNIFACS Offers 23 different graduation programs, among them: Medicine, Law, Business, Architecture, Psychology, and many others, including many degrees on Engineering.

== Post-graduation programs ==
UNIFACS began offering post-graduate programs on 1993 and since then became the major college from the north-northeast of Brazil on that kind of education. Since 1997, the important Brazilian magazine VOCÊ S.A. has held yearly awards of the best post-graduate programs in Brazil, and UNIFACS has been the only college from Bahia to appear on it, and has been present on all editions of the prize. On the last year of the prize, 2010, UNIFACS has secured a second place, a third, two fourths, one fifth, one seventh and one tenth, on the different programs offered. Unifacs, today, offers 42 different post-graduate courses including MBAs, Specialisations, Masters and Doctorates.

== Infra-structure ==
UNIFACS has 11 campus in Bahia, where the courses are distributed, being 10 in the city of Salvador, and 1 in Feira de Santana, 120 km from Salvador.

== Exchange programmes ==
Since 2010, UNIFACS have been incorporated into Laureate International Universities, with over 50 colleges, including units in USA, Brazil, and Australia.

Students from any university of the Laureate group have easy access and discounts on exchange programs, summer courses and other educational activities. For instance, an architecture student in Brazil can easily choose to study 1 or 2 semesters on Spain, USA, Turkey, Chile and other colleges from the Laureate group that has the architecture course and will continue paying the same as he would in Brazil. After that he can choose to return to Brazil or do 1 or 2 semesters on another university.

On the end of each semester, Laureate publicize a list with short-courses from the universities linked to the group. Any student from the Laureate group can assist to these classes, that mostly lasts from 2 to 6 weeks.

== Notable alumni ==
- Tânia Martins (born 1957), poet
