= Jutahy Júnior =

Brazilian politician

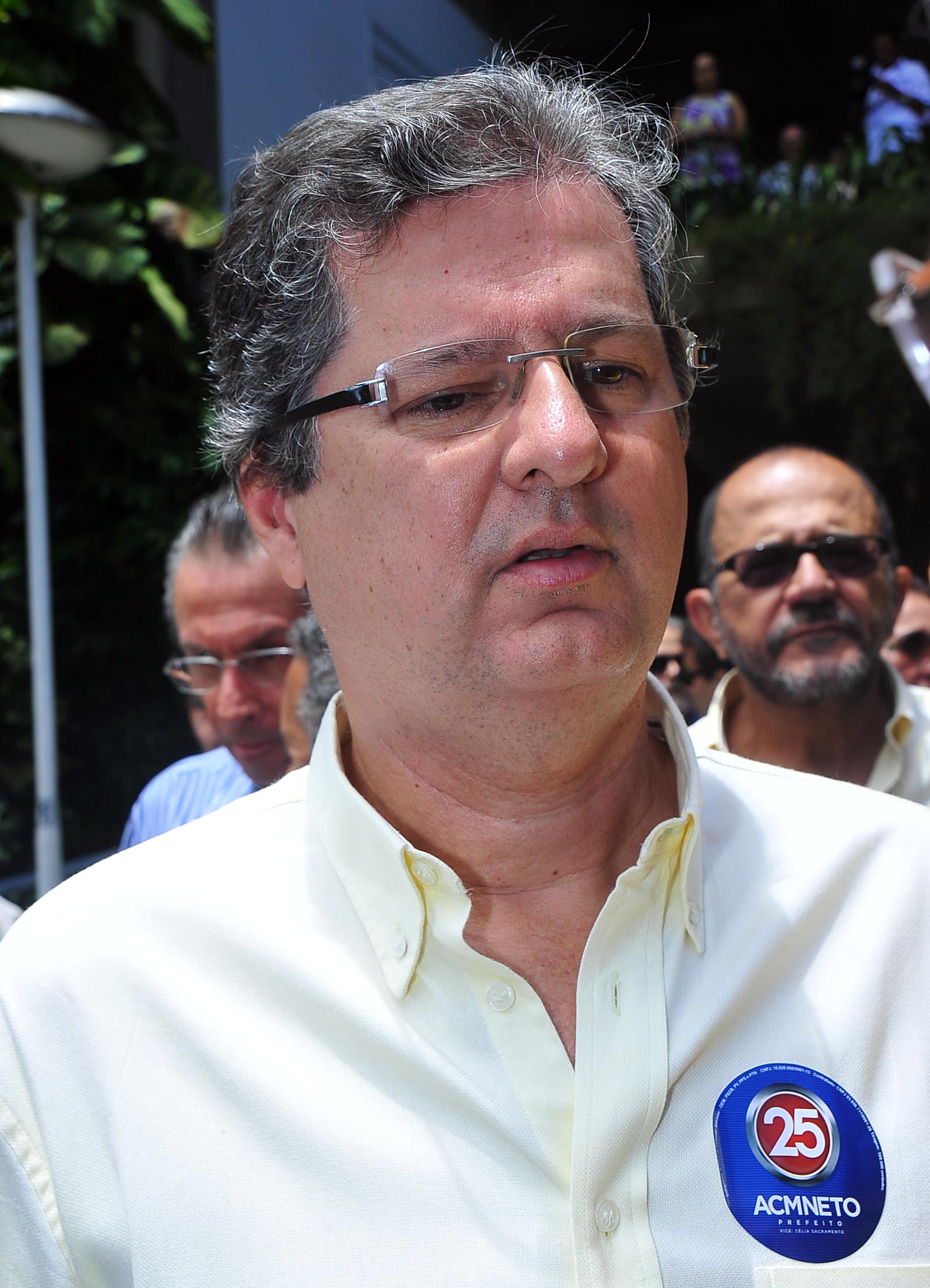
- Jutahy Júnior

State Representative for Bahia
- In office 1979–1983

Federal Deputy for Bahia
- In office 1983–1995

Federal Deputy for Bahia
- In office 1999–2019

Personal details
- Born: October 14, 1955 Salvador, Bahia, Brazil
- Parents: Grandfather: Juracy Magalhães; Father: Jutahy Magalhães; Mother: Mercedes Carvalho Brito Magalhães

Jutahy Magalhães Júnior (born October 14, 1955) is a Brazilian politician, affiliated with the Brazilian Social Democracy Party (PSDB). He was a state deputy and is in his sixth term as a federal deputy. In 2016, he voted in favor of the impeachment process of then President Dilma Rousseff. In April 2017 he voted in favor of Labor Reform. In August 2017, he voted in favor of the process calling for the opening of an investigation by then President Michel Temer.

In the 2018 elections, he was a candidate for the position of senator, but he was in 4th place with about 8% of the valid votes.
