= Juracy Magalhães =

Brazilian politician

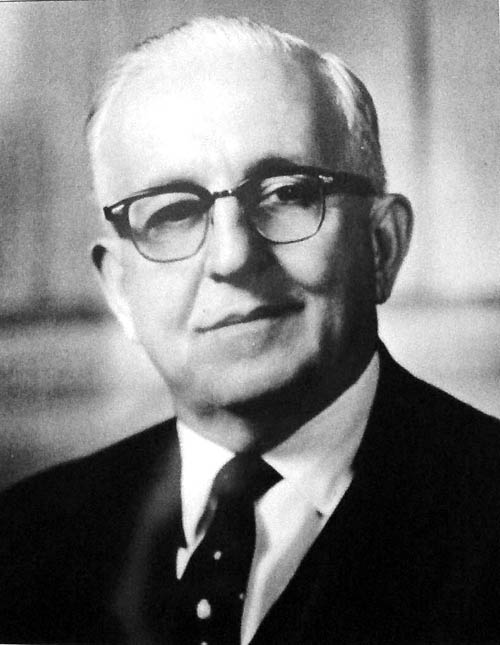
- Juracy Magalhães

24th Governor of Bahia
- In office 1931–1937
- Preceded by: Raimundo Rodrigues Barbosa
- Succeeded by: Antônio Fernandes Dantas

34th Governor of Bahia
- In office 1959–1963
- Preceded by: Lomanto Júnior
- Succeeded by: Antônio Balbino

Minister of Justice and Internal Affairs
- In office 19 October 1965 – 14 January 1966
- President: Humberto Castelo Branco
- Preceded by: Luís Viana Filho
- Succeeded by: Mem de Azambuja Sá

Minister of Foreign Affairs of Brazil
- In office 17 January 1966 – 15 March 1967
- President: Humberto Castelo Branco
- Preceded by: Vasco Leitão da Cunha
- Succeeded by: José de Magalhães Pinto

Senator of Bahia
- In office 1 February 1955 – 7 April 1959

1st President of Petrobras
- In office 2 April 1954 – 2 September 1954
- Preceded by: None (job created)
- Succeeded by: Artur Levy

Personal details
- Born: 4 August 1905 Fortaleza, Ceará, Brazil
- Died: 15 May 2001 (aged 95) Salvador, Bahia, Brazil
- Party: União Democrática Nacional
- Spouse: Lavínia Borges Magalhães
- Children: Jutahy Magalhães; Jutahy Júnior (Grandson)
- Parent: Mother: Júlia Montenegro Magalhães Father: Joaquim Magalhães
- Profession: Political and military

Military service
- Allegiance: Brazil
- Branch/service: Brazilian Army
- Years of service: 1927–1967
- Rank: General

Juracy Montenegro Magalhães GCC • GCIH (4 August 1905 – 15 May 2001) was a Brazilian military officer and politician. During his career, Magalhães was the state governor of Bahia twice: between 1931—1937 (federal interventor appointed by Getúlio Vargas) and 1959—1963 (elected); senator for Bahia (1955–1959), Minister of Justice (1965–66) and Minister of External Relations (1966–67) under president Humberto de Alencar Castello Branco, and Brazilian Ambassador to the United States. He was also the chairman of state oil company Petrobras (1954) and chairman of then state-run mining company Vale do Rio Doce.

== Biography ==
He was the son of Joaquim Magalhães and Júlia Montenegro Magalhães. Having completed high school at the Lyceum of Ceará, he entered the military career. In 1927 he became an aspirant. A member of the tenentist movement, at the age of 25 he stood out during the so-called Revolution of 1930, leading a military column that traveled the northeast along the coast, entering the territories of Alagoas, Pernambuco, Sergipe and Bahia.

His military career was successful. In 1933 he reached the rank of Captain; in 1940, that of Major; Lieutenant Colonel in 1945; Colonel in 1950 and General in 1957.

Despite being born in Ceará, it was in Bahia that he found his definitive address. He won a house of friends, in the capital of Bahia, at Monte Serrat – the same one where his son, Juracy Magalhães Júnior, committed suicide. His other son Jutahy Magalhães was also a politician and his grandson Jutahy Magalhães Júnior is a federal deputy.

His political trajectory was greatly benefited by his proximity to the military. He held the following positions: senator of the Republic, federal deputy, military attaché and ambassador of Brazil to the United States, Minister of Justice and Foreign Affairs. He was also the first President of Petrobras and chaired the Vale do Rio Doce Company.

== Government of Bahia ==
Magalhães occupied the government of the State of Bahia for three terms (the first, initiated as an intervener, was later endorsed by the Legislative Assembly – here considered as a single term, since there was no continuity solution).

=== Intervention ===
Getúlio Vargas and Juracy Magalhães, on 4 January 1954. Media under the custody of Arquivo Nacional.

Juracy Magalhães was a lieutenant in the Army when he took over the government, appointed interventor by Getúlio Vargas – a position that promoted him as one of the articulators of the coup that ended, in Brazil, the Old Republic. He took over on 19 September 1931, and remained there until 25 April 1935, when he resumed – this time through an indirect election, by the Legislative Assembly – remaining in office until 10 November 1937.

The task was not, at first, easy: the position was claimed by the old politician JJ Seabra, who had supported Getúlio and had already been governor. Juracy was then a young lieutenant, only 25, almost 26 years old. His condition as an "outsider" only aggravated the reaction of the old chiefs of local politics, who aroused great opposition to him. But since then he has shown great ability to overcome these challenges, leaving them even more strengthened. Juracy also led a secret life: he had been an FBI informant during the last Vargas administration and confided to Adolf Berle that he had conspired against him in 1945. A noteworthy fact was that, during his tenure, the first arrest of the future leftist leader, Carlos Marighella, occurred, for having written a poem that criticized the interventor.

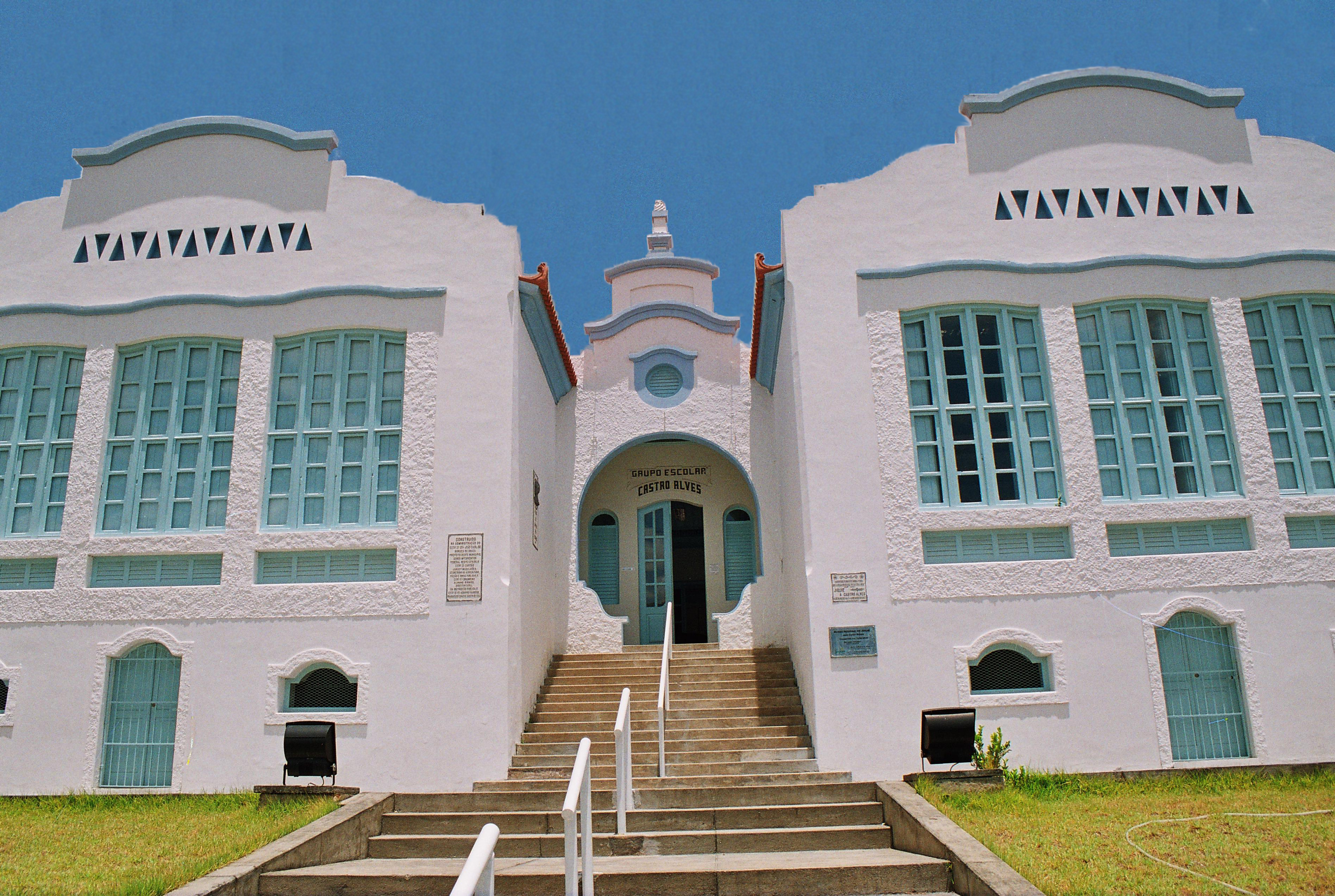
The building where the "Grupo Escolar Castro Alves" was located, in Jequié, was built by Juracy and opened by him in 1934.

Among his accomplishments, he started the construction works of the Rui Barbosa Forum – interrupted by the interventionist Landulfo Alves, who followed him, and finally resumed and concluded by Otávio Mangabeira .

In the place where the home of the tribune Cezar Zama had been, in Praça de Piedade, he built the headquarters of the Public Security Secretariat – the centralizing body of repression, in the totalitarian regime that lived in the country at that time.

Inaugurated the Bahia Cocoa Institute in 1936, a ceremony attended by Getúlio Vargas himself.

In 1935/1936, the government of Juracy Magalhães interrupted the activities of the Integralist Brazilian Action – AIB (1932–1937), a movement idealized by the politician, poet and journalist Plínio Salgado, in the State of Bahia, with numerous conflicts with the police forces over the Integralists in an attempt to continue promoting their activities, with numerous arrests and deaths occurring [ 5 ], later on, justice guarantees the right of Integralists to continue their activities in the region.

On 10 November 1937, President Getúlio Vargas established the Estado Novo, a unitary dictatorial regime . Despite being loyal to the government, Juracy was opposed to that action by the president, which was in fact characterized as a coup . On the same day, he made a statement on Rádio Sociedade da Bahia and, on the 11th, he transmitted the position to the military commander in the State, leaving the Government Palace.
