= Robinson Faria =

Brazilian politician

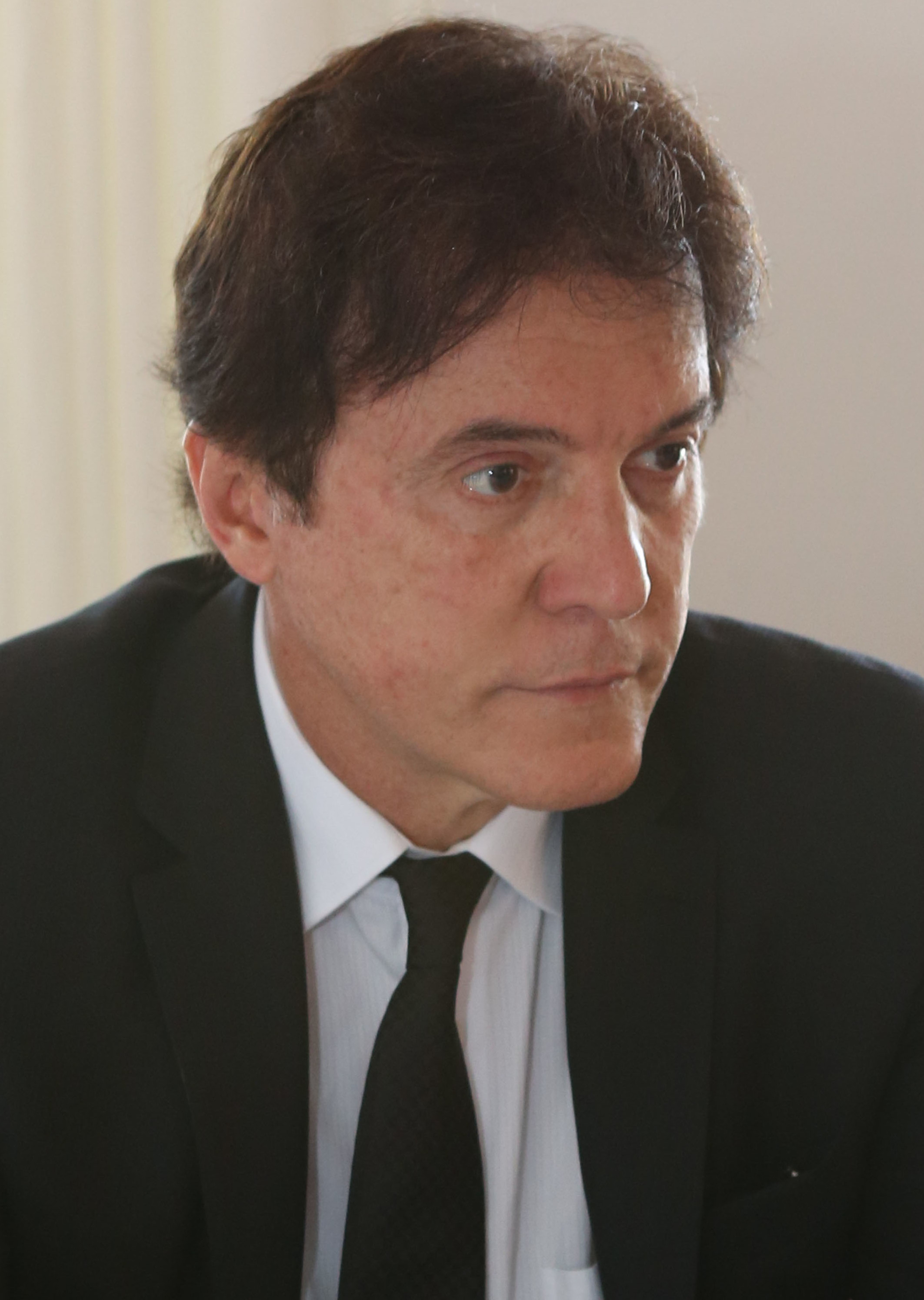

Member of the Chamber of Deputies
- Incumbent
- Assumed office 1 February 2023
- Constituency: Rio Grande do Norte

Governor of Rio Grande do Norte
- In office 1 January 2015 – 1 January 2019
- Vice Governor: Fábio Dantas
- Preceded by: Rosalba Ciarlini
- Succeeded by: Fátima Bezerra

Vice Governor of Rio Grande do Norte
- In office 1 January 2011 – 1 January 2015
- Governor: Rosalba Ciarlini
- Preceded by: Iberê Ferreira
- Succeeded by: Fábio Dantas

Member of the Legislative Assembly of Rio Grande do Norte
- In office 1 February 1987 – 1 January 2011
- Constituency: At-large

Personal details
- Born: Robinson Mesquita de Faria; 12 April 1959 (age 67) Natal, Rio Grande do Norte, Brazil
- Party: PL (2022–present)
- Other political affiliations: PMDB (1980–93); PFL (1993–2004); PMN (2004–11); PSD (2011–22)
- Spouse: Julianne Faria
- Children: 6, including Fábio
- Relatives: Patrícia Abravanel (daughter-in-law)
- Education: Federal University of Rio Grande do Norte
- Profession: Lawyer

Robinson Mesquita de Faria is a Brazilian politician. He had served as governor of Rio Grande do Norte state in Brazil (2015–2018).

== Biography and early career ==
Born in Natal, Rio Grande do Norte, on April 12, 1959, Robinson Mesquita de Faria is married to Julianne Faria and is father of six children.

One of his sons, Fábio Faria, is married to Patrícia Abravanel, daughter of TV presenter and entrepreneur Silvio Santos; they have a son.

Faria graduated in Law from the Federal University of Rio Grande do Norte. For 24 years, he was a state representative and the last two mandates held the Presidency of the state legislature.

On his own initiative, he embraced a political career in the Agreste region, from where his family originates. Faria was elected the youngest state deputy in 1986. He worked in the private sector before turning to political activity.

Faria is state president of the Party of National Mobilization (PMN) and leads the largest party in the Legislative Assembly of Rio Grande do Norte.

In the 2006 elections, he was the most voted parliamentary in state for the second time, and the 2nd best-rated in proportionate numbers in the country, with 70,782 votes. In the Assembly, Faria held the positions of Chairman of the Committee on Constitution and Justice (twice), 1st Secretary, Vice President and President.

In recent years, Robinson presided over debates on Agribusiness, Shrimp and Fruit Crops; the installation of an oil refinery; the construction of the São Gonçalo do Amarante International Airport and the General Law of micro and small businesses.

== Vice Governor ==
He was elected vice governor in 2010 as Rosalba Ciarlini's running mate, with 52.46% of the votes.

== Governor ==
Faria was elected governor in 2014 with 54.42% of the votes against 45.58% for his main opponent, Henrique Eduardo Alves.
