= Raul Henrique Srour =

Brazilian businessman

Raul Henrique Srour (born July 1, 1961) is a Brazilian businessman who headed a criminal ring in Operation Car Wash, a corruption scandal.
