= Afonso Hamm =

Brazilian politician (born 1962)

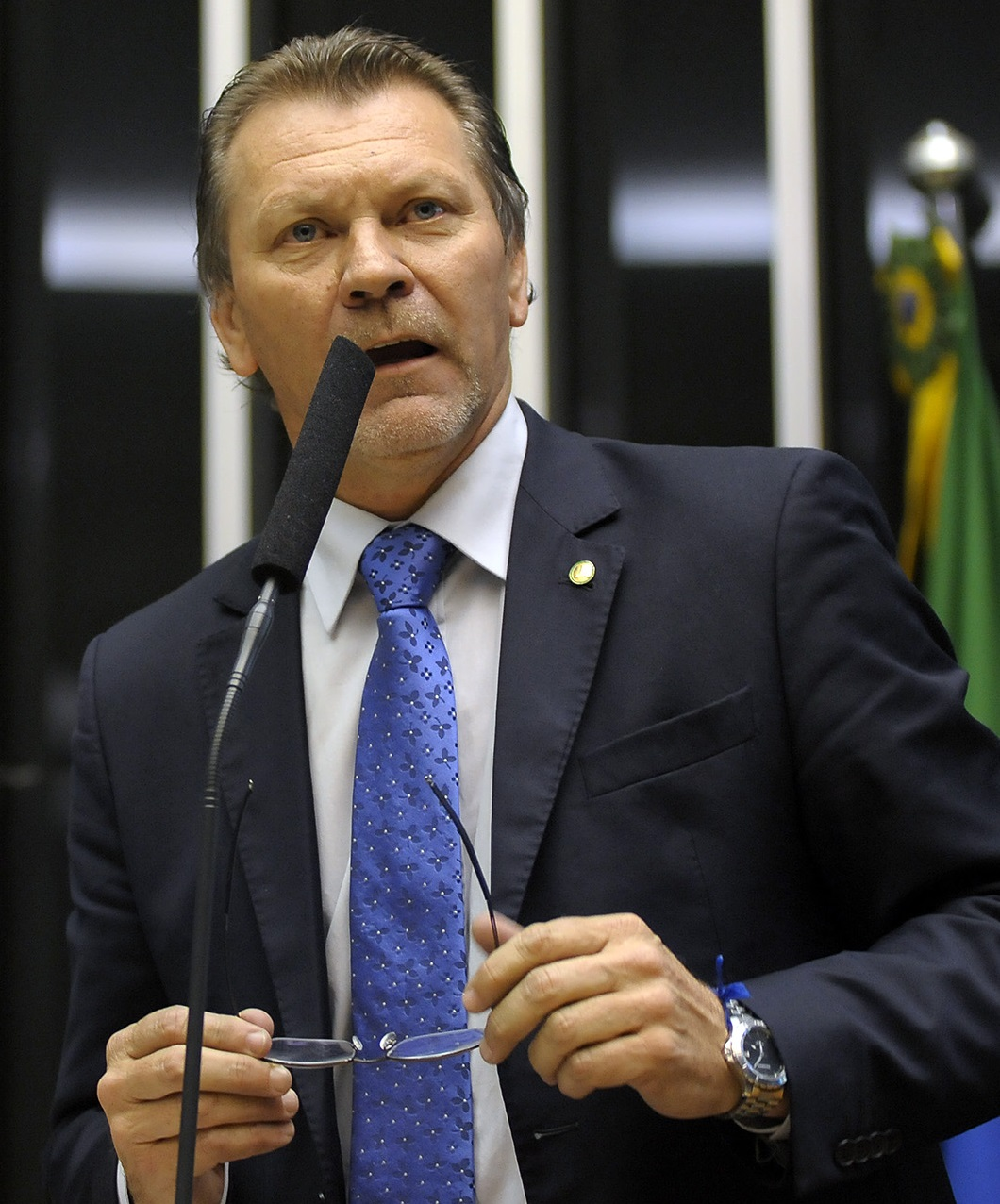
- Hamm in 2015

Member of the Chamber of Deputies
- Incumbent
- Assumed office 27 September 2005
- Constituency: Rio Grande do Sul

Personal details
- Born: José Afonso Ebert Hamm; 25 April 1962 (age 64) Hulha Negra, Rio Grande do Sul, Brazil
- Party: PP (since 1995)
- Profession: Engineer

José Afonso Ebert Hamm (born 25 April 1962) is a Brazilian politician serving as a member of the Chamber of Deputies since 2005. From 2009 to 2010, he served as chairman of the tourism and sports committee.
