= Hulha Negra =

Municipality of Rio Grande do Sul, Brazil

Coordinates: 31°24′S 53°53′W

- Municipality
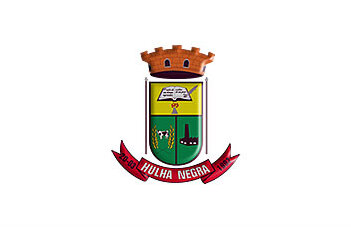
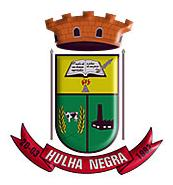
- Flag Coat of arms

- Location of Hulha Negra in Rio Grande do Sul
- Country: Brazil
- Region: South
- State: Rio Grande do Sul
- Mesoregion: Sudoeste Rio-Grandense
- Microregion: Campanha Meridional
- Founded: 20 March 1992

Government
  - Mayor: Renato Machado (PP, 2021 - 2024)

Area
  - Total: 822.608 km^{2} (317.611 sq mi)

Population (2021)
  - Total: 6,894
  - Density: 8.381/km^{2} (21.71/sq mi)
- Demonym: Hulhanegrense
- Time zone: UTC−3 (BRT)
- Website: Official website

Hulha Negra is a municipality in the state of Rio Grande do Sul, Brazil. As of 2020, the estimated population was 6,836.

== See also ==
- List of municipalities in Rio Grande do Sul
