= Rosalba Ciarlini =

Brazilian politician

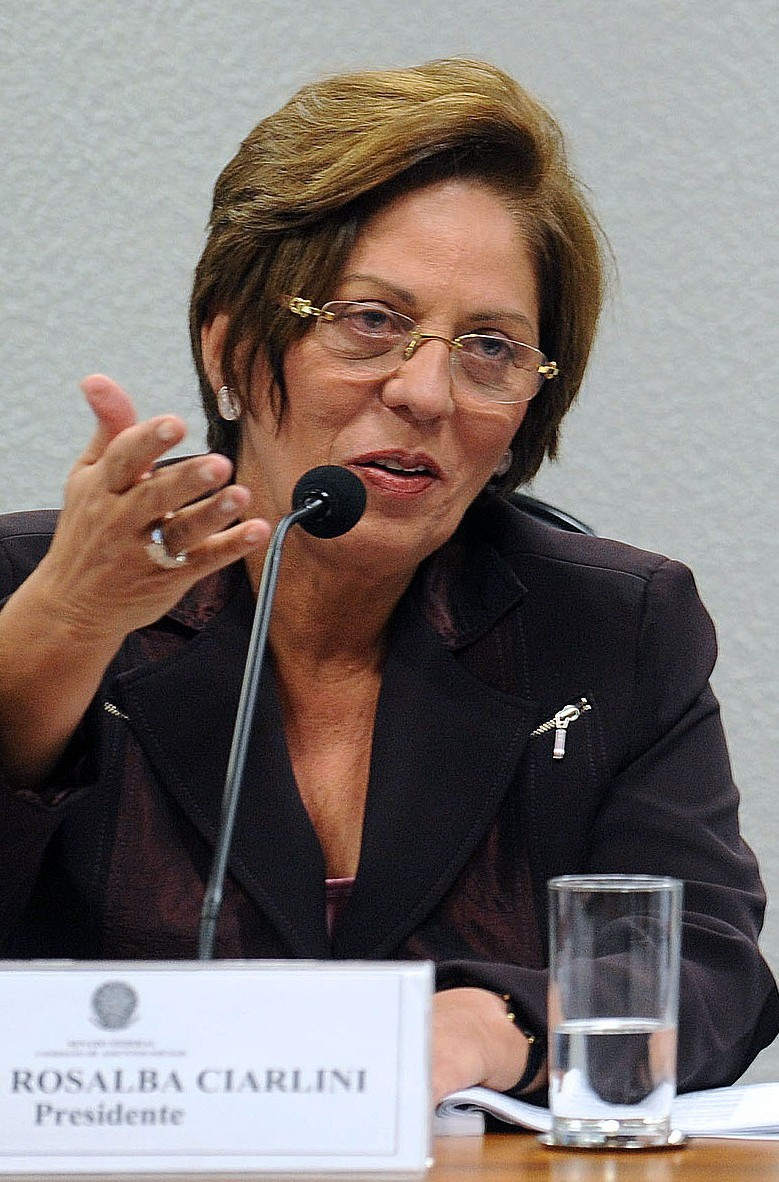

56th Governor of Rio Grande do Norte
- In office January 1, 2011 – January 1, 2015
- Preceded by: Iberê Ferreira
- Succeeded by: Robinson Faria

Senator for Rio Grande do Norte
- In office February 1, 2007 – December 31, 2010

Mayor of Mossoró
- In office January 1, 1989 – December 31, 1992; January 1, 1997 – December 31, 2004; January 1, 2017 – December 31, 2020

Personal details
- Born: October 26, 1952 (age 73) Mossoró, RN
- Party: PDT (1986–1992); PFL (1992–2007); DEM (2007–2016); PP (2016–present)
- Profession: Doctor

Rosalba Scotia Ciarlini Rosado (Mossoró, October 26, 1952) is a medical doctor and Brazilian politician. Affiliated with the PP, she was the governor of the state of Rio Grande do Norte.

== Early years ==
Rosalba Ciarlini was born on October 26, 1952, in Mossoró, Ciarlini is of Italian descent, and granddaughter of Italian Pietro Ciarlini, one of the first professional soccer players in Rio Grande do Norte. She is a pediatrician with a degree from Federal University of Rio Grande do Norte. She was president of the branch of Unimed in Mossoró.

She is married to Carlos Augusto Rosado, son of former Governor Dix-Sept Rosado and has four children. Her husband's sister, Ruth Ciarlini, was a state representative and is now deputy mayor of Mossoró.

== Political career ==
=== Prefect of Mossoró ===
She made her political debut in 1988 when she was elected mayor of Mossoró, for the first time, under the Democratic Labor Party banner. In 1994, she ran for vice governor on the gubernatorial ticket headed by Lavoisier Maia Sobrinho, but was defeated by Garibaldi Alves Filho in the first round. She was elected mayor again in 1996 and re-elected in 2000.

=== Senator ===
In 2006 she was elected senator for Rio Grande do Norte after a hard race against then-Senator Fernando Bezerra, with a margin of 0.76% of the votes. She was chairwoman of the Senate Social Affairs Committee from 2009 to 2010.

=== Governor ===
In state elections in Rio Grande do Norte in 2010, she was elected governor in the first round with 52.46% of the votes. Her vice governor is Robinson Faria.
