= Tonheca Dantas =

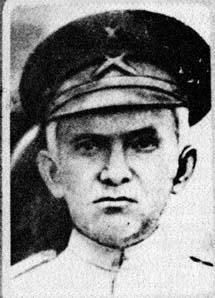
- Tonheca Dantas.

Background information
- Birth name: Antônio Pedro Dantas
- Born: June 13, 1871
- Origin: Acari, Rio Grande do Norte, Brazil (Empire of Brazil)
- Died: February 7, 1940 (aged 68); Natal, Rio Grande do Norte, Brazil
- Genres: Choro, Polka, Brazilian Tango, March, Waltz, Dobrado, Maxixe, Xote, Hymns
- Occupation(s): Composer, Bandleader, Conductor
- Instrument(s): Clarinet, Conducting

Antônio Pedro Dantas (June 13, 1871 – February 7, 1940), better known as Tonheca Dantas, was a prolific Brazilian composer and bandleader (maestro), author of an estimated repertoire of over a thousand musical pieces. Born in the locality of Carnaúba de Baixo, then part of the municipality of Acari, (Note: The locality of Carnaúba de Baixo, where he was born, belonged to the municipality of Acari at the time. This area would later give rise to the municipality of Carnaúba dos Dantas, which only became a district in 1938 and a municipality in 1953.) Rio Grande do Norte, he was the son of João José Dantas, a lieutenant colonel in the National Guard, and Vicência Maria do Espírito Santo, a formerly enslaved woman. He belonged to a family with a musical tradition, being the cousin of fellow composer and conductor Felinto Lúcio Dantas.

== Education and Early Career ==
He showed an interest in music from an early age, learning the fundamentals with his brothers, particularly José Venâncio, in a local music band in his hometown. He was a self-taught musician, never having received formal musical training in academic institutions. He developed his skills through constant practice and interaction with local musicians, learning to play various instruments, especially wind instruments. His skill and dedication made him an influential figure in his community from a young age, even inspiring his cousin Felinto Lúcio Dantas to pursue a career in music.

== Career as Conductor ==
=== Rio Grande do Norte Military Police Band ===
In 1898, he moved to Natal, the capital of Rio Grande do Norte, where he was hired as the conductor of the Security Battalion's Music Band, which would become the band of the Military Police of Rio Grande do Norte (PMRN). His official appointment as music master occurred on May 30, 1898, with an initial three-year contract. His renowned musical talent exempted him from the soldier training course. In recognition of his contribution, the auditorium of the PMRN Music Band was named in his honor.

An anecdote, recorded in the biography written by Cláudio Galvão, illustrates his versatility: during the audition for conductor, when asked which instrument he would choose to play a presented score, Dantas confidently replied: ‘Any one... You tell me which one you want’. The examining committee, surprised, challenged him to perform the piece on various instruments of the band, which he did, demonstrating great musical mastery.

=== Belém and Paraíba ===
In 1903, Tonheca Dantas moved to Belém, in the state of Pará, where he took over the direction of the Military Firefighters Corps Music Band. He remained in this position until 1910. Subsequently, in 1910, he moved to the state of Paraíba, where he led the music bands of the cities of Alagoa Grande and Alagoa Nova for approximately one year.

=== Return to Natal ===
In 1911, he returned definitively to Natal and rejoined the Music Band of the Military Police of Rio Grande do Norte.

== Compositions and Style ==
Tonheca Dantas left a vast body of work, estimated at over a thousand compositions, notable for its diversity of genres. Although best known for his waltzes, he also composed dobrados, maxixes, hymns, xotes, polkas, marches, and other orchestral pieces. His music continues to be present in the repertoire of philharmonic bands throughout Brazil and is occasionally performed abroad.

=== Waltz "Royal Cinema" ===
One of his most celebrated creations is the waltz Royal Cinema. The piece was commissioned by José Petronilo de Paiva, owner of the namesake cinema in Natal, to be played at the opening of film screenings. The waltz gained unexpected international notoriety during World War II, when it was frequently broadcast by BBC Radio in London and, according to reports, also by Radio Berlin. However, in these broadcasts, the authorship was often omitted, being announced as "author unknown".

=== Other Notable Works ===
Besides "Royal Cinema," his output includes pieces such as the Waltz Delírio (Delirium), the suite Melodia do Bosque (Melody of the Woods), the Waltz A Desfolhar Saudades (Shedding Longings), the solemn march Republicana (Republican), and the dobrado Tenente José Paulino (Lieutenant José Paulino). The presence of his waltzes Delírio and Odette in the sheet music archive of the military police band of Ceará demonstrates the circulation of his music beyond the borders of Rio Grande do Norte. His compositions have been recorded over time by various artists and groups, such as the Music Band of the 14th Infantry Regiment of Paraíba, saxophonist Ivanildo (known as Ivanildo do Sax de Ouro), musician Zé de Elias, the String Quartet of the Federal University of Rio Grande do Norte (UFRN), and the Rio Grande do Norte Symphony Orchestra. In 1983, UFRN released the LP "Tonheca Dantas – Royal Cinema," dedicated to his work. His great-grandson, musician Antônio José Madureira, also paid tribute to him by recording the "Suíte retreta" in 1997.

== Legacy and Recognition ==
Tonheca Dantas is recognized as a central figure in the musical history of Rio Grande do Norte, having achieved "the highest position among the musicians of Rio Grande do Norte" and enjoyed popularity throughout Northeast Brazil and other regions of the country. The former mayor of Natal, Djalma Maranhão, affectionately called him "Strauss Papa-Jerimum." The nickname combined a laudatory comparison to the famous Austrian waltz composer, Johann Strauss II, with the regional term "Papa-jerimum" (literally "pumpkin eater," a designation for natives of Rio Grande do Norte), highlighting the fusion of European style with local identity in his music.

The Government of the State of Rio Grande do Norte paid him posthumous tribute by inaugurating the Sala Tonheca Dantas (Tonheca Dantas Hall) in the prestigious Teatro Alberto Maranhão in Natal. In 2021, on the occasion of the sesquicentennial (150 years) of his birth, various celebrations were held, including the unveiling of a statue in his honor in the city of Carnaúba dos Dantas.

== Bibliography ==
- Galvão, Cláudio (1998). A desfolhar saudade: uma biografia de Tonheca Dantas (in Portuguese). Natal: Departamento Estadual de Imprensa/Gráfica Santa Maria. (Note: The book was reissued in 2021 by the Legislative Assembly of Rio Grande do Norte.)
