= Dantas =

Dantas is a Portuguese language surname. It may refer to:

- Alexandre Dantas (born 1979), Brazilian mixed martial arts fighter
- Allan Dellon dos Santos Dantas (born 1979), Brazilian football player
- António Vitalino Dantas (1941–2026), Portuguese Roman Catholic bishop
- Beatriz Góis Dantas (born 1941), Brazilian anthropologist
- Damiris Dantas (born 1992), Brazilian basketball player
- Daniel Dantas (actor) (born 1954), Brazilian actor
- Daniel Dantas (entrepreneur) (born 1954), Brazilian banker
- Eduardo Dantas (born 1989), Brazilian mixed martial artist
- Gustavo Dantas (born 1974), Brazilian martial artist
- Isidore Dantas (born 1947), Indian writer
- Ivonete Dantas (born 1959), Brazilian politician
- Júlio Dantas (1876–1962), Portuguese writer
- João Rodrigues Dantas, Portuguese nobleman
- João Vitor Silva Dantas de Oliveira (born 2004), Brazilian footballer
- Leandro Teixeira Dantas (born 1987), Brazilian football player
- Lucas Marcolini Dantas Bertucci (born 1989), Brazilian football player
- Luiz Martins de Souza Dantas (1876–1954), Brazilian diplomat
- Marcello Dantas (born 1967), Brazilian artist
- Maria Dantas (born 1969), Spanish politician
- Mercedes Dantas Lacombe (1888–1966), Argentine poet and teacher
- Nelson Dantas (1928–2006), Brazilian actor
- Pedro Iarley Lima Dantas (born 1974), Brazilian football player
- Rodrigo Correa Dantas (born 1989), Brazilian football player
- Rubem Dantas (born 1954), Brazilian musician
- San Tiago Dantas (1911–1964), Brazilian diplomat and Minister of Foreign Affairs
- Welington Dantas de Jesus (born 1982), Brazilian football player

== See also ==
- Francisco Dantas, municipality in the state of Rio Grande do Norte, Brazil
- Poço Dantas, a municipality in the state of Paraíba, Brazil
- Riachão do Dantas, municipality in the state of Sergipe, Brazil
