= Ayrton Lucas =

Brazilian footballer (born 1997)

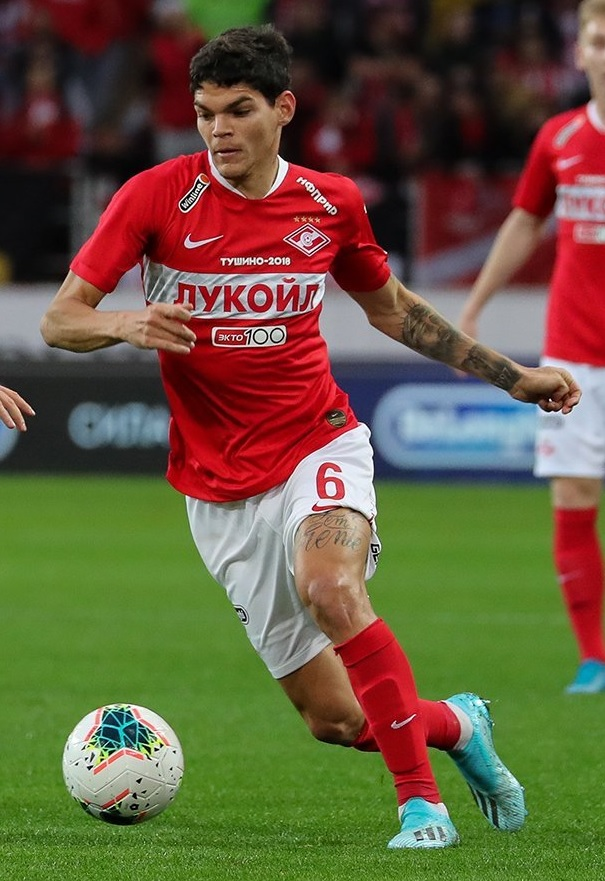
- Ayrton Lucas with Spartak Moscow in 2019

Personal information
- Full name: Ayrton Lucas Dantas de Medeiros
- Date of birth: 19 June 1997 (age 29)
- Place of birth: Carnaúba dos Dantas, Brazil
- Height: 1.80 m (5 ft 11 in)
- Position: Left back

Team information
- Current team: Flamengo
- Number: 6

Youth career
- 2012–2014: ABC
- 2014–2015: Fluminense

Senior career*
Years	Team	Apps	(Gls)
2015–2018	Fluminense	34	(0)
2016	→ Madureira (loan)	9	(0)
2017	→ Londrina (loan)	33	(2)
2018–2022	Spartak Moscow	88	(3)
2022	→ Flamengo (loan)	31	(2)
2023–	Flamengo	119	(13)

International career^{‡}
2016	Brazil U20	3	(0)
2019	Brazil U23	1	(0)
2023	Brazil	2	(0)
- * Club domestic league appearances and goals as of 7 April 2026 ‡ National team caps and goals as of 20 June 2023

Ayrton Lucas Dantas de Medeiros (born 19 June 1997), known as Ayrton Lucas, is a Brazilian footballer who plays as a left back for Campeonato Brasileiro Série A club Flamengo.

== Club career ==
=== Fluminense ===
Born in Carnaúba dos Dantas, Rio Grande do Norte, Ayrton Lucas started his youth career with the academy of ABC Futebol Clube and joined the academy of Fluminense in October 2014. On 8 August 2015, he was promoted to the senior team. However, he soon lost his position to Léo Pelé and Giovanni and was subsequently loaned out to Madureira on 23 February 2016 for the Campeonato Carioca. In April, he returned to his parent club.

On 4 January 2017, Ayrton Lucas was loaned out to Londrina. Twenty-five days later, he made his first team debut in a 1–1 draw against Prudentópolis. On 13 April, he scored his first goal for the club in a 3–0 victory against Rio Branco. Londrina went on to win the Primeira Liga, with Ayrton Lucas finding the net during the penalty shoot-out in the final against Atlético Mineiro.

After returning from loan, Ayrton Lucas was included in the Fluminense squad for the 2018 Florida Cup. He was issued the number 6 jersey for the Série A season.

=== Spartak Moscow ===
On 17 December 2018, Ayrton Lucas signed a long-term contract with Russian club Spartak Moscow. He scored his first goal for Spartak against FC Tambov on 26 September 2020. He followed up with his second in the same match and led the team to a 2–0 win.

On 19 January 2022, he extended his contract with Spartak until May 2026.

=== Flamengo ===
On 31 March 2022, Ayrton Lucas joined Flamengo on loan until the end of 2022, with a conditional obligation to buy.

In 2022 Ayrton Lucas had the best season of his career winning Copa do Brasil and Copa Libertadores with a total of six assists and two goals in 41 appearances for Flamengo.

On 16 December 2022, Flamengo announced the permanent transfer of Ayrton Lucas with a €7m transfer fee, he signed a contract with the club until December 2027.

== International career ==
In April 2016, Ayrton Lucas was called to the under-20 national team for the Suwon JS Cup.

== Career statistics ==
=== Club ===
As of match played 4 September 2026

Appearances and goals by club, season and competition
Club	Season	League			State league		National cup		Continental		Other		Total	
Club	Season	Division	Apps	Goals	Apps	Goals	Apps	Goals	Apps	Goals	Apps	Goals	Apps	Goals
Fluminense	2015	Série A	4	0	0	0	0	0	—		—		4	0
Fluminense	2016	Série A	2	0	0	0	0	0	—		1 (Note: Appearances in Primeira Liga)	0	3	0
Fluminense	2018	Série A	28	0	11 (Note: Appearances in Campeonato Carioca)	0	2	0	10 (Note: Appearance in Copa Sudamericana)	0	—		51	0
Fluminense	Total		34	0	11	0	2	0	10	0	1	0	58	0
Madureira (loan)	2016	Carioca	—		9	0	0	0	—		—		9	0
Londrina (loan)	2017	Série B	33	2	16 (Note: Appearances in Campeonato Paranaense)	1	0	0	—		4	0	53	3
Spartak Moscow	2018–19	Russian Premier League	13	0	—		1	0	—		—		14	0
Spartak Moscow	2019–20	Russian Premier League	27	0	—		4	0	4 (Note: Appearances in the UEFA Europa League)	0	—		35	0
Spartak Moscow	2020–21	Russian Premier League	27	2	—		2	1	—		—		29	3
Spartak Moscow	2021–22	Russian Premier League	21	1	—		1	0	8 (Note: Two appearances in the UEFA Champions League, six appearances in the UEFA Europa League)	0	—		30	1
Spartak Moscow	Total		88	3	0	0	8	1	12	0	0	0	108	4
Flamengo (loan)	2022	Série A	31	2	—		4	0	6 (Note: Appearances in Copa Libertadores)	0	—		41	2
Flamengo	2023	Série A	35	4	10	3	8	0	7	0	5 (Note: One Appearance in Supercopa do Brasil, two appearances in Recopa Sudamericana, two appearances in FIFA Club World Cup)	0	65	7
Flamengo	2024	Série A	32	3	11	1	8	0	9	1	—		60	5
Flamengo	2025	Série A	18	2	5	0	4	0	7	0	4 (Note: Three Appearances in FIFA Club World Cup, one appearance in FIFA Intercontinental Cup)	0	38	2
Flamengo	2026	Série A	16	0	3	0	1	0	6	0	2 (Note: One Appearances in Supercopa do Brasil, one appearance in FIFA Intercontinental Cup)	0	28	0
Flamengo	Total		101	9	29	4	21	0	29	1	11	0	191	14
Career total			287	16	65	5	35	1	57	1	16	0	450	23

=== International ===
As of match played 20 June 2023

Appearances and goals by national team and year
National team	Year	Apps	Goals
Brazil	2023	2	0
Total		2	0

== Honours ==
Londrina

- Primeira Liga: 2017

Spartak Moscow

- Russian Cup: 2021–22

Flamengo

- FIFA Challenger Cup: 2025
- FIFA Derby of the Americas: 2025
- Copa Libertadores: 2022, 2025
- Campeonato Brasileiro Série A: 2025
- Copa do Brasil: 2022, 2024
- Supercopa do Brasil: 2025
- Campeonato Carioca: 2024, 2025, 2026
