= Thabatta Pimenta =

Brazilian politician, activist and radio presenter

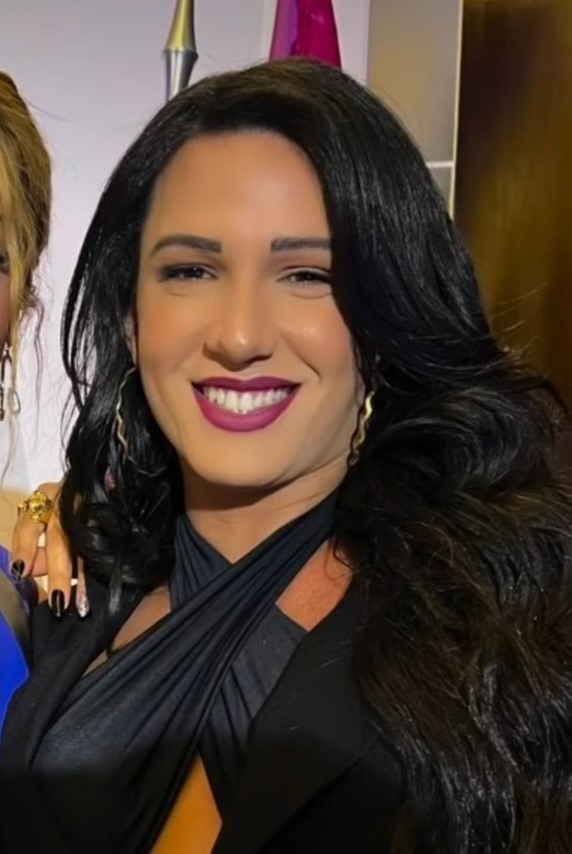

Councilwoman of Natal
- Incumbent
- Assumed office 1 January 2025
- Constituency: At-large

Councilwoman of Carnaúba dos Dantas
- In office 1 January 2021 – 1 January 2025
- Constituency: At-large

Personal details
- Born: Thabatta Pimenta de Medeiros Silva; 15 January 1992 (age 34) Carnaúba dos Dantas, Rio Grande do Norte, Brazil
- Party: PV (2026–present)
- Other political affiliations: PSDB (2016–2020); PROS (2020–2022); PSB (2022–2023); PSOL (2024–2025)
- Relatives: Maria Aparecida de Medeiros Silva (mother); Elton Fernandes da Silva (father)
- Occupation: Politician; activist; radio broadcaster

Thabatta Pimenta de Medeiros Silva (Carnaúba dos Dantas, 15 January 1992) is a Brazilian politician, activist and radio broadcaster, affiliated with the Socialism and Liberty Party (PSOL). She serves as a councilwoman in Natal, Rio Grande do Norte.

== Career ==
=== Radio broadcasting ===
She began her career as a radio personality in 2008 when participating in a beauty pageant. She then received an invitation to work in radio, using this platform for entertainment while also promoting issues affecting people with disabilities and the LGBTQ community.

=== Political life and activism ===
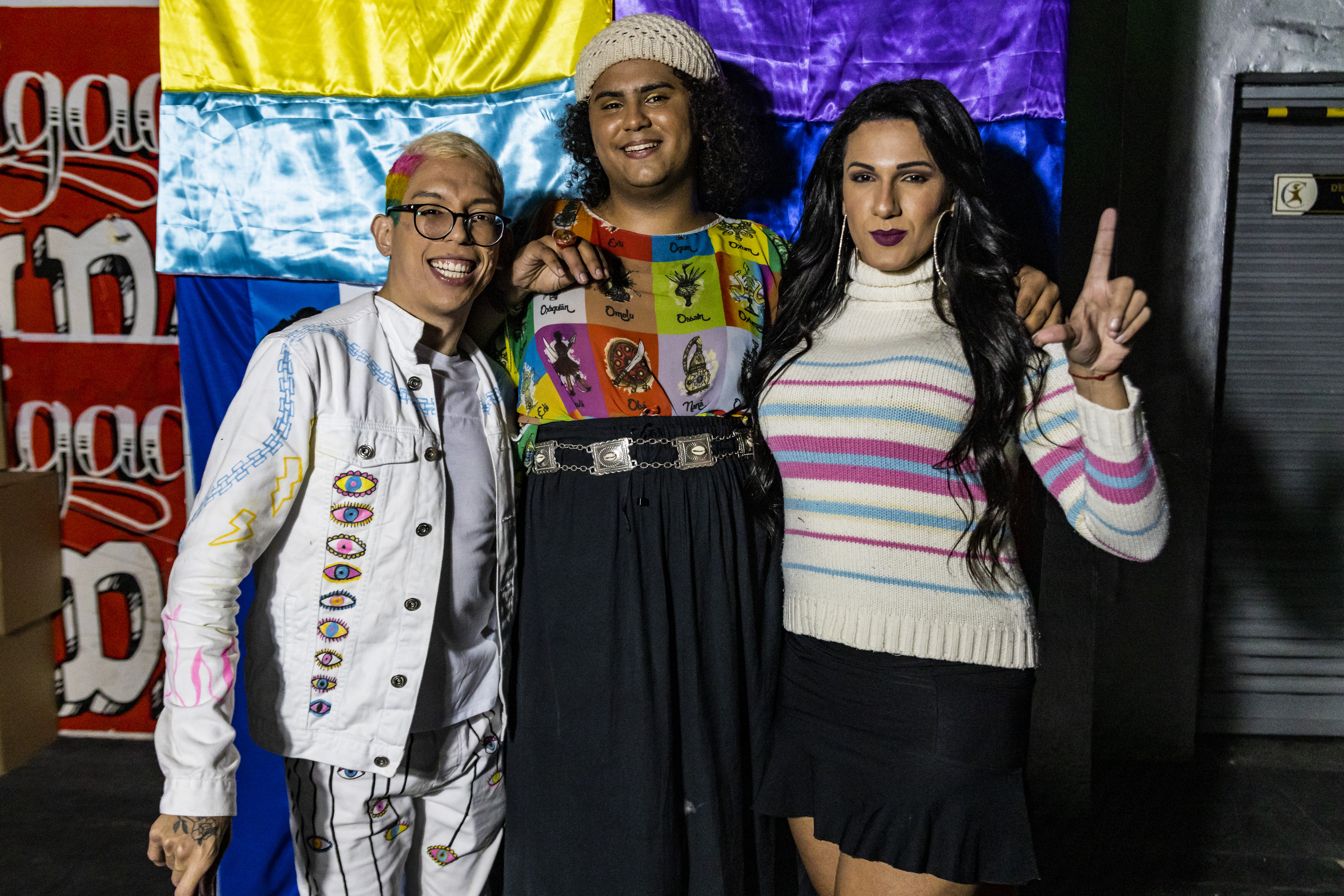
Thabatta doing the L next to Ivan Baron and Ágata Pauer, in front of the bisexual and pansexual flags

She began her career in institutional politics during the 2016 Brazilian municipal elections, running for councilwoman under the Brazilian Social Democracy Party (PSDB). She received the seventh-highest vote count but wasn't elected as the party did not reach the Hare quota.

In 2020, she ran again for councilwoman and was elected under the Republican Party of the Social Order, achieving the eighth-highest vote count. Elected as the first transgender councilwoman of Carnaúba dos Dantas in the 2020 Brazilian municipal elections, she also became the first transgender councilwoman in Rio Grande do Norte state history. In the 2022 elections, she ran for federal deputy under the Brazilian Socialist Party (PSB), declaring herself "a travesti voice, an LGBTQIA+ voice. A young voice from Rio Grande do Norte."

During the 2022 elections, she ran for federal deputy representing Rio Grande do Norte under the PSB, receiving 40,533 votes and ranking as the 14th most voted candidate for the position in the state. As councilwoman of Carnaúba dos Dantas, she advocated for issues concerning pregnant and lactating transgender individuals and chaired the Committee on Education, Culture, Health and Social Assistance in the Municipal Chamber. As an activist for disability rights, she approved projects focused on people with reduced mobility and against ableism.

One of Pimenta's inspirations for her activism against ableism comes from her brother, who has cerebral palsy and uses a wheelchair. In her political career, she also advocates for human rights. She was one of the Brazilian leaders invited to participate in the 6th LGBTI Political Leadership Meeting of the Americas and Caribbean, held in Mexico City in 2023. In 2024, she was elected as the first transgender councilwoman of Natal, Rio Grande do Norte and the most voted woman in the municipal council. In 2026, she joined the Green Party (PV), and that same year she was elected federal deputy, becoming the first transgender woman to be elected deputy for Rio Grande do Norte and the Northeast.

== Political violence and transphobia ==
=== Attacks and conviction of Bolsonaro supporter for fake news ===
As councilwoman of Carnaúba dos Dantas, Pimenta faced political and transphobic attacks from conservative groups. One incident occurred in 2020 when the legislator proposed a bill against LGBTQ hate crimes. One of her main critics, Abraão Cândido — a supporter of Jair Bolsonaro, Brazil's far-right former president — spread fake news accusing her of promoting a "gay parade" in the city, aiming to incite hatred against her, particularly among evangelical communities.

The situation escalated in 2021 when Pimenta organized an event for Pride Month, distributing 40 food baskets to vulnerable LGBT community members with support from the Government of Rio Grande do Norte. Cândido spread false claims that the baskets had been misappropriated, leading to an investigation by the Public Prosecutor's Office. After proving her innocence, Pimenta filed a lawsuit for moral damages.

In April 2022, the Rio Grande do Norte Court of Justice ordered Cândido to pay R$3,000 in pain and suffering. The ruling emphasized that the false information aimed to damage Thabatta's reputation. The councilwoman considered the decision a victory against LGBTQ hate crimes.

=== Shopping center discrimination case ===
In September 2022, during the 2022 Rio Grande do Norte state election, Pimenta was barred from using the women's restroom at Shopping Via Direta in Natal's South Zone. Security personnel and the mall manager questioned whether her gender marker matched her identification documents. The incident, witnessed and recorded, gained widespread attention.

Thabatta filed a lawsuit against the shopping center for discrimination. In April 2024, the Rio Grande do Norte Court of Justice ordered the establishment to pay R$5,000 in hedonic damages, emphasizing the severity of transphobia and its psychological impact.

As Northeast Brazil's only transgender councilwoman at the time, Pimenta stated the incident revived childhood traumas. She subsequently intensified advocacy for transgender rights, emphasizing basic rights recognition and inclusive dignity.

=== Online attacks during the 2022 elections ===
During the 2022 elections, Pimenta, then a federal deputy candidate for the PSB in Rio Grande do Norte, became a target of transphobic attacks, primarily on social media. A case study by the Transfobia em Dados project identified 665 transphobic attacks against transgender candidates, perpetrated by 591 users (demonstrating relative diversity among attackers). These attacks mainly occurred after the first election round and in the wake of the discrimination case regarding bathroom use involving the politician.

The same study conducted by the São Paulo State University (UNESP) found that attacking accounts predominantly featured bios with terms like "Family", "God", and "Conservative" — a pattern consistent across gender identity attacks. The attacks involved challenges to gender identity, reflecting increasing violence against transgender people in Brazil, particularly in electoral contexts. According to MonitorA research, Twitter was the most used platform for spreading these attacks.

=== Transphobia during the 2024 elections ===
During a cultural parade in the Cidade Alta neighborhood amid Natal's 2024 municipal elections, Pimenta was targeted with transphobic slurs and survived an attempted vehicular assault while distributing campaign materials. The unidentified aggressor verbally attacked the candidate before attempting to run her over. Thabatta shared footage of the incident on social media, exposing the threat to her personal security.

The case sparked discussions about political violence in Rio Grande do Norte, highlighting increased attacks against transgender individuals and LGBTQIA+ activists. In 2024, the state recorded a significant rise in assaults against these groups, reflecting growing intolerance.

== See also ==
- LGBTQ rights in Rio Grande do Norte
