= Tico Mineiro =

Brazilian footballer (born 1976)

Personal information
- Full name: Dilmar dos Santos Machado
- Date of birth: 26 January 1976 (age 50)
- Place of birth: Belmonte, Brazil
- Height: 1.77 m (5 ft 10 in)
- Position: Forward

Youth career
- Democrata-GV

Senior career*
Years	Team	Apps	(Gls)
1992–1993	Democrata-GV		
1993–1994	1. FC Heidenheim		
1995	Democrata-GV		
1996	Desportiva-ES		
1997	Alverca		
1998	Botafogo		
1999	Rio Branco-SP		
1999	Criciúma		
2000–2001	Portuguesa Santista		
2001	Chunnam Dragons		
2002	Francana	25	(16)
2002–2003	Chunnam Dragons		
2004	Ituano		
2004	Bandeirante		
2005	Corinthians-AL		
2005	ASA		
2005–2006	CRB		
2007	Santo André		
2008	CRAC		
2008	Bacabal		
2009	CRAC		
2009	Sampaio Corrêa		
2010	Cianorte		
2010	Maranhão		
2010	Comercial-SP		
2011	CSA		
- * Club domestic league appearances and goals as of 15 October 2023

Dilmar dos Santos Machado (born 26 January 1976), better known as Tico Mineiro, is a Brazilian former professional footballer who played as a forward.

== Career ==
He gained the nickname Tico Mineiro at Desportiva, as there was another athlete named Tico in the squad. Even though he was from Bahia, he received the nickname because he came from the Democrata-GV. Tico also formed a successful attacking duo with Zinho at Portuguesa Santista, in 2001 Campeonato Paulista. He had two spells at South Korea's Chunnam Dragons, in addition to being A2's top scorer for Francana in 2002.

In 2005, after playing in the Campeonato Alagoano for Corinthians, he played in the Copa Alagipe for ASA, becoming champion.

== Honours ==
Botafogo

- Torneio Rio-São Paulo: 1998

ASA

- Copa Alagipe: 2005

Bacabal

- Taça Cidade de São Luís: 2008

Sampaio Corrêa

- Taça Cidade de São Luís: 2009

Individual

- 2002 Campeonato Paulista Série A2 top scorer: 16 goals
- 2005 Campeonato Alagoano top scorer: 15 goals
