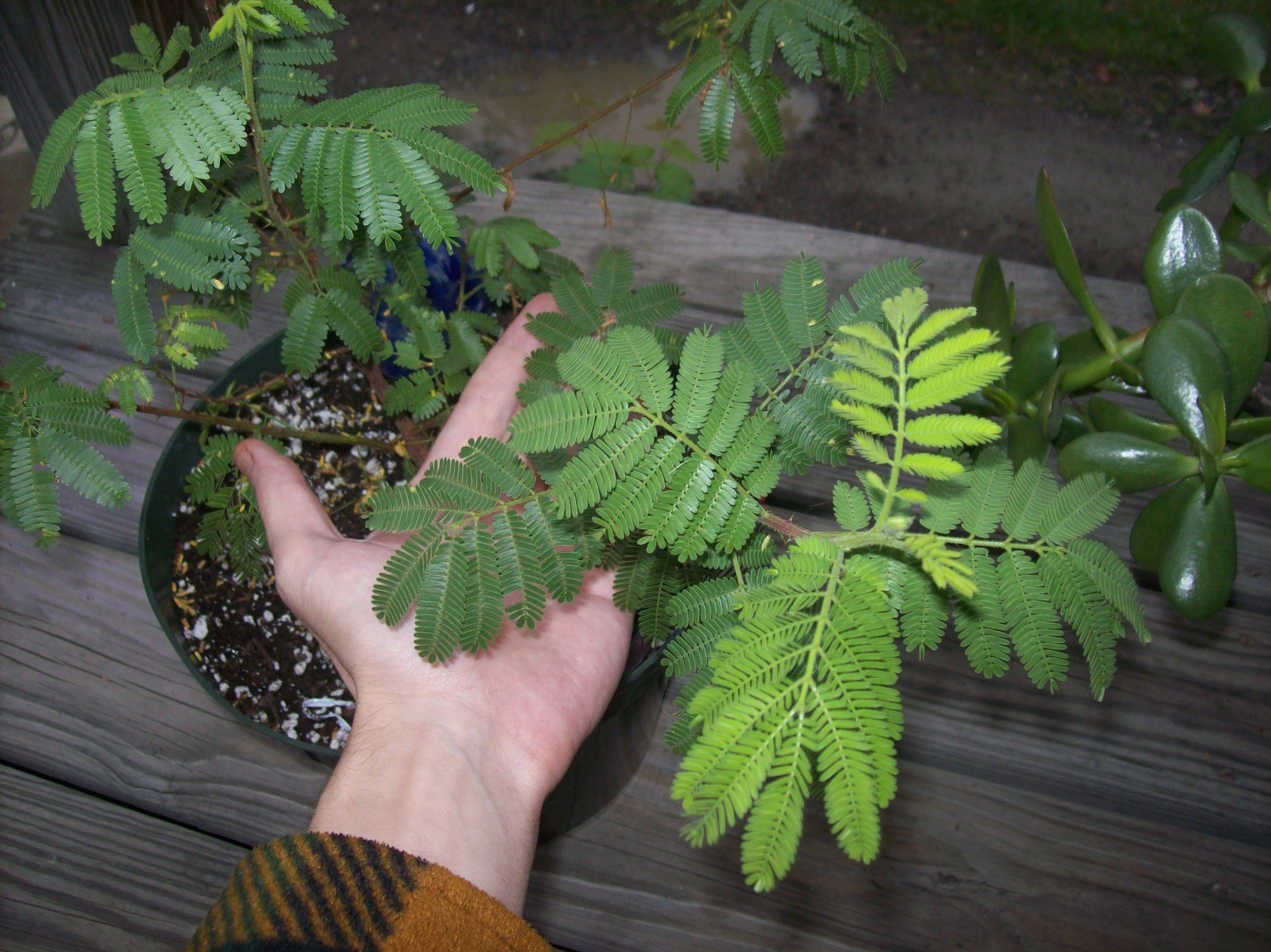

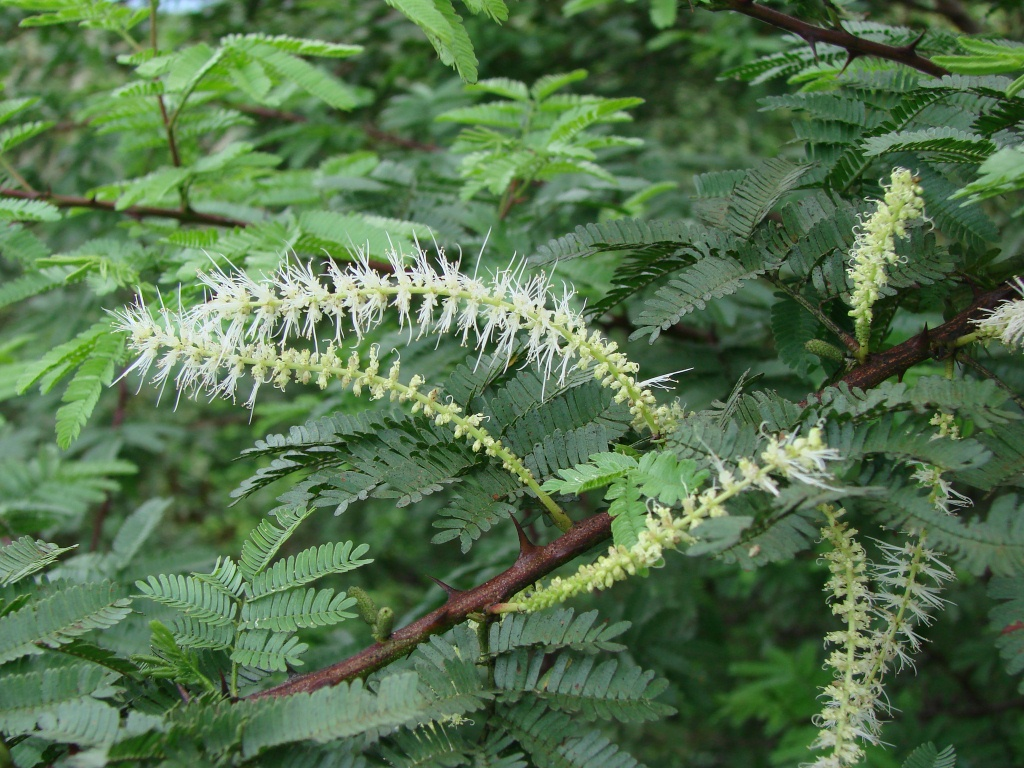
- Mimosa tenuiflora

Scientific classification
- Kingdom: Plantae
- Clade: Tracheophytes
- Clade: Angiosperms
- Clade: Eudicots
- Clade: Rosids
- Order: Fabales
- Family: Fabaceae
- Subfamily: Caesalpinioideae
- Clade: Mimosoid clade
- Genus: Mimosa
- Species: M. tenuiflora

Binomial name
- Mimosa tenuiflora (Willd.) Poir.
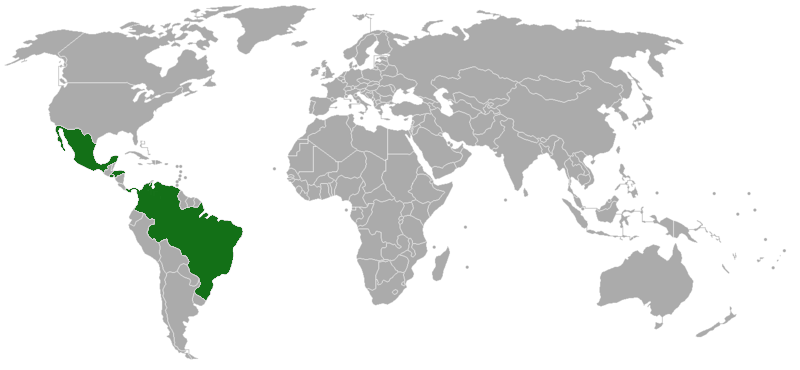
- Range of Mimosa tenuiflora

Synonyms
- Acacia hostilis Mart.; Acacia jurema Mart.; Acacia tenuiflora Willd.; Mimosa cabrera H. Karst.; Mimosa hostilis (C. Mart.) Benth.; Mimosa limana Rizzini

= Mimosa tenuiflora =

Species of plant

Mimosa tenuiflora, syn. Mimosa hostilis, also known as jurema preta, calumbi (Brazil), tepezcohuite (México), carbonal, cabrera, jurema, black jurema, and binho de jurema, is a perennial tree or shrub native to the northeastern region of Brazil (Paraíba, Rio Grande do Norte, Ceará, Pernambuco, Bahia) and found as far north as southern Mexico (Oaxaca and coast of Chiapas), and the following countries: El Salvador, Honduras, Panama, Colombia and Venezuela. It is most often found in lower altitudes, but it can be found as high as 1,000 m (3,300 ft).

== Description ==
The fern-like branches have leaves that are Mimosa-like, finely pinnate, growing to 5 cm (2.0 in) long. Each compound leaf contains 15–33 pairs of bright green leaflets 5–6 mm (0.20–0.24 in) long. The tree itself grows up to 8 m (26 ft) tall and it can reach 4–5 m (13–16 ft) tall in less than 5 years. The white, fragrant flowers occur in loosely cylindrical spikes 4–8 cm (1.6–3.1 in) long. In the Northern Hemisphere it blossoms and produces fruit from November to June or July. In the Southern Hemisphere it blooms primarily from September to January. The fruit is brittle and averages 2.5–5 cm (0.98–1.97 in) long. Each pod contains 4–6 seeds that are oval, flat, light brown and 3–4 mm (0.12–0.16 in) in diameter. There are about 145 seeds/1 g (0.035 oz). In the Southern Hemisphere, the fruit ripens from February to April.

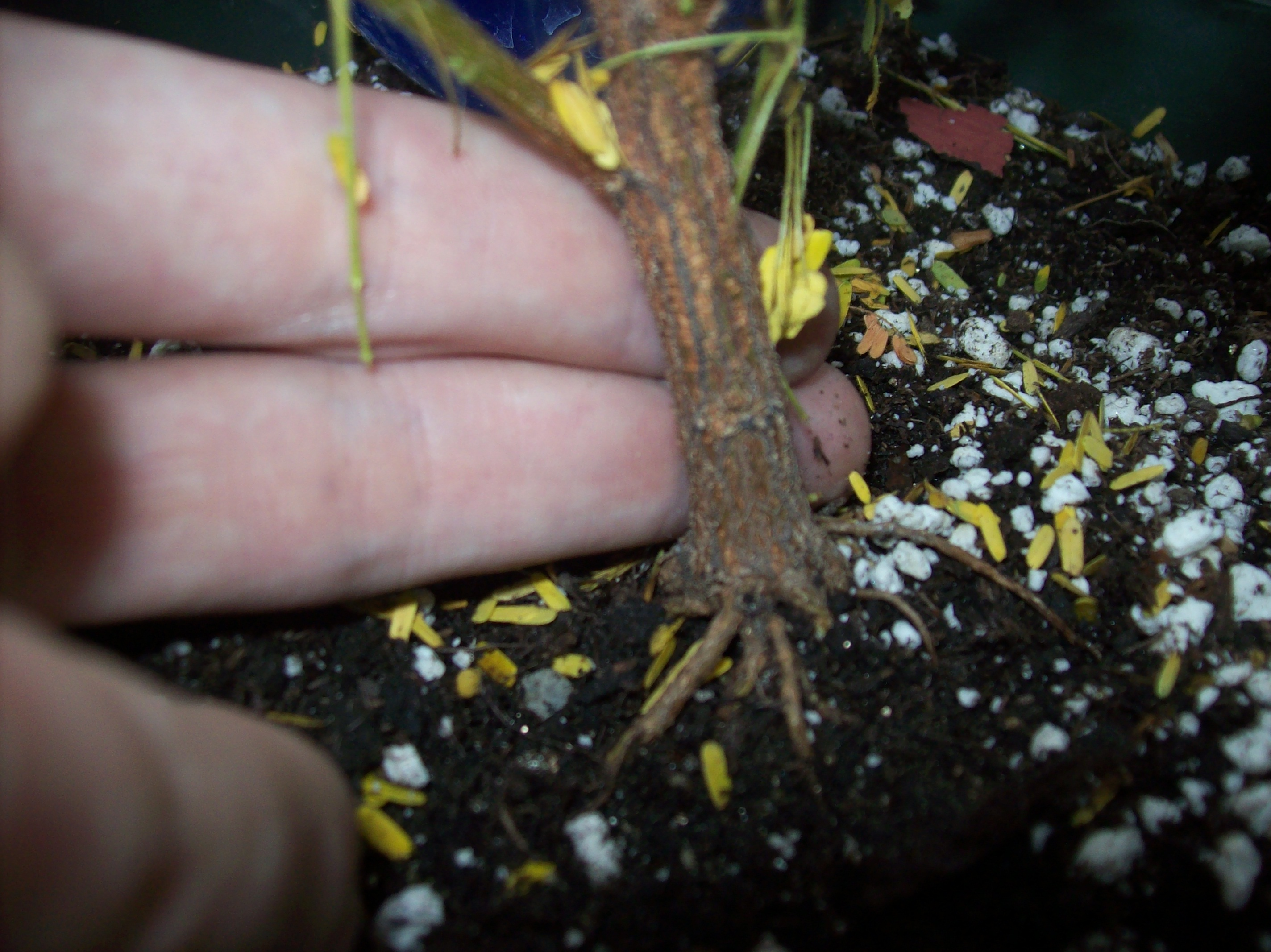
Small Mimosa tenuiflora stem and roots

The tree's bark is dark brown to gray. It splits lengthwise and the inside is reddish brown.

The tree's wood is dark reddish brown with a yellow center. It is very dense, durable and strong, having a density of about 1.11 g/cm^{3}.

Bakke et al. suggest that Mimosa tenuiflora is an important pioneer plant, as it recovers biomass and population density faster then other species from the same area.

== Medicinal uses ==
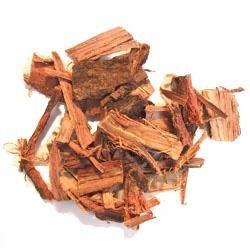
Mimosa tenuiflora root bark

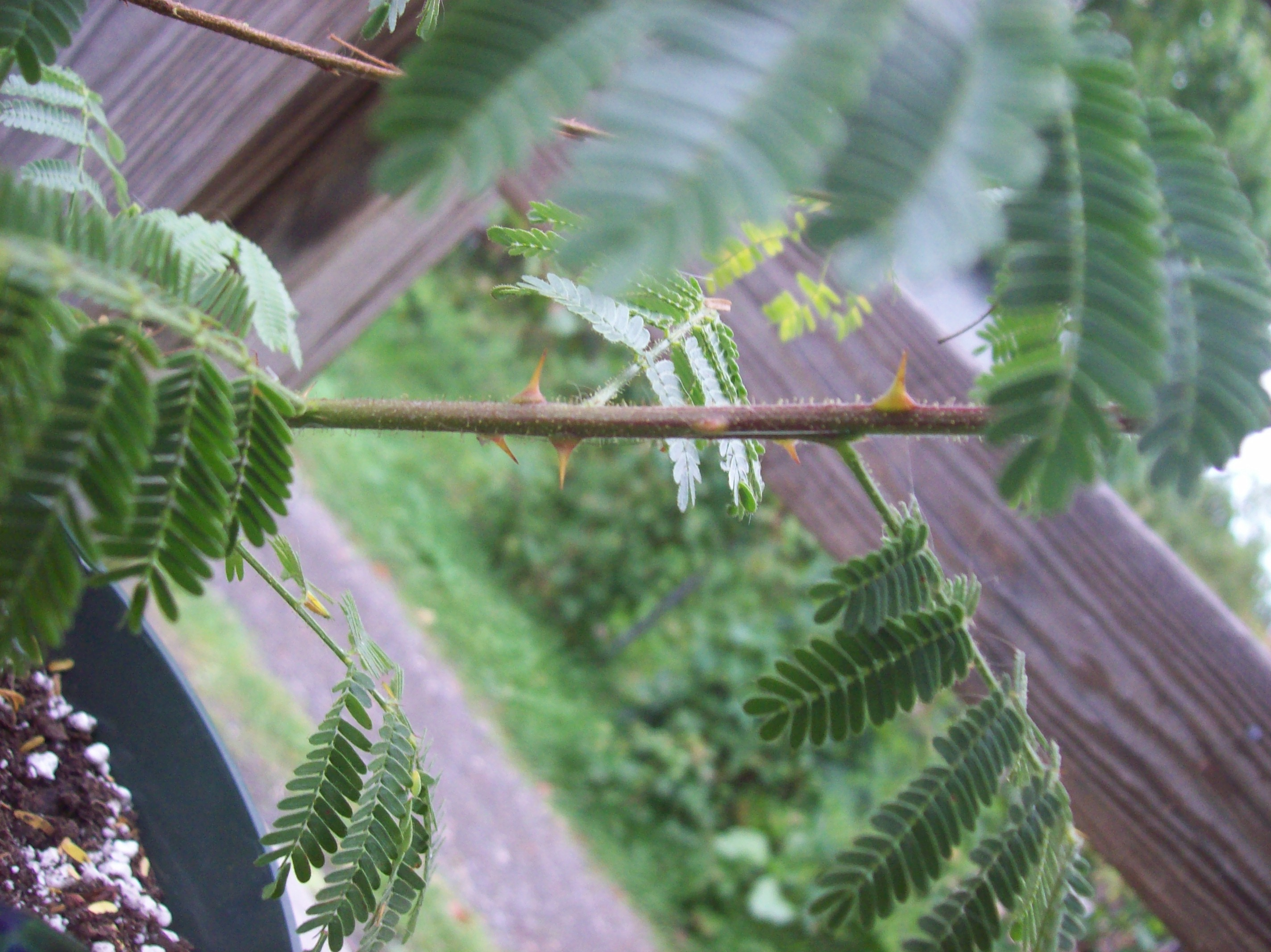
Mimosa tenuiflora

A tea made of the leaves and stem has been used to treat tooth pain. For cases of cough and bronchitis, a water extract (decoction) of Mimosa tenuiflora is drunk. A handful of bark in one liter of water is used by itself or in a syrup. The solution is drunk until the symptoms subside.

One preliminary clinical study found Mimosa tenuiflora to be effective in treating venous leg ulcerations.

Aqueous extracts of Mimosa are widely used for wound healing and burns in Central and South America. Consequently, the products of the plant (generally grouped under the term "Tepezcohuite") have become a popular and easily produced cosmetic ingredient in commercial skincare products.

== Other uses ==
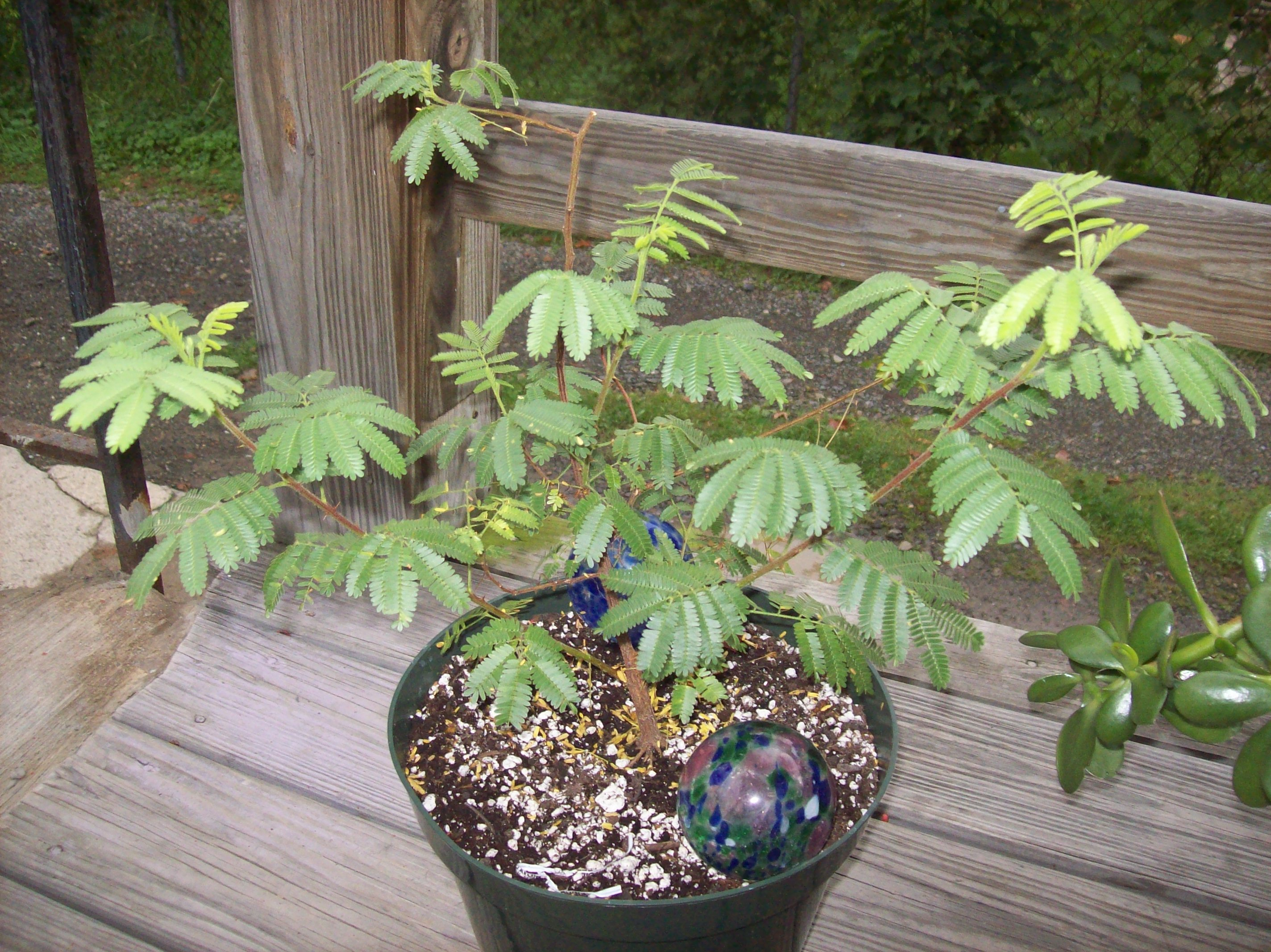
Mimosa tenuiflora syn. Mimosa hostilis provides life saving food for animals in drought.

The tree is an acceptable source of forage or fodder for animals, providing vital protein and other nutrients. It does well in the dry season and in drought, while providing life saving food for local livestock and animals. Cows, goats and sheep eat the pods and leaves. There seems to be evidence that Mimosa tenuiflora forage or fodder cause development defects to pregnant ruminants in Brazil.

Like most plants in the family Fabaceae, Mimosa tenuiflora fertilizes the soil via nitrogen fixing bacteria.

Mimosa tenuiflora is a very good source of fuel wood and works very well for making posts, most likely because of its high tannin content (16%), which protects it from rot. Due to its high tannin content, the bark of the tree is widely used as a natural dye and in leather production. It is used to make bridges, buildings, fences, furniture and wheels. It is an excellent source of charcoal and at least one study has been done to see why this is the case.

== Chemistry ==
The bark is known to be rich in tannins, saponins, alkaloids, lipids, phytosterols, glucosides, xylose, rhamnose, arabinose, lupeol, methoxychalcones, and kukulkanins.

== Psychedelic uses ==
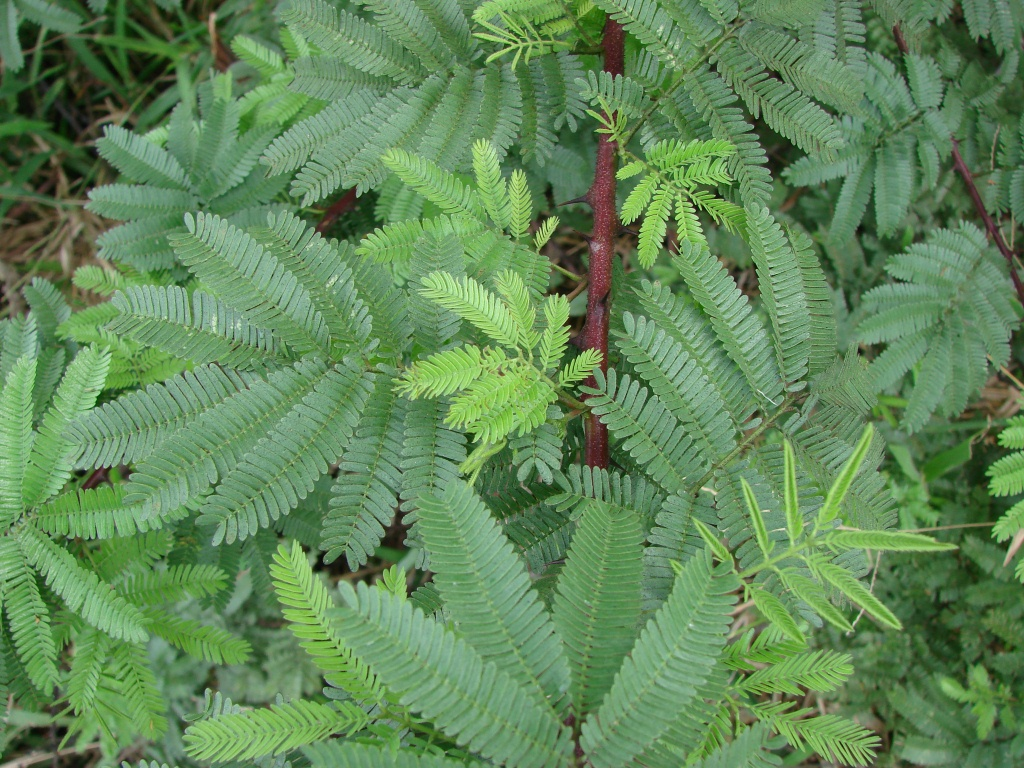
Mimosa tenuiflora' syn. Mimosa hostilis

Mimosa tenuiflora is an entheogen used by the Jurema Cult (O Culto da Jurema) in northeastern Brazil. Dried Mexican Mimosa tenuiflora root bark has been shown to have a dimethyltryptamine (DMT) content of about 1-1.7%. The stem bark has about 0.03% DMT.

The parts of the tree are traditionally used in northeastern Brazil in a psychoactive decoction also called Jurema or Yurema. Analogously, the traditional Western Amazonian sacrament Ayahuasca is brewed from indigenous ayahuasca vines. However, to date no β-carbolines such as harmala alkaloids have been detected in Mimosa tenuiflora decoctions, yet the Jurema is used in combination with several plants.

The isolation of the chemical compound yuremamine from Mimosa tenuiflora as reported in 2005 represents a new class of phytoindoles.

== Cultivation ==
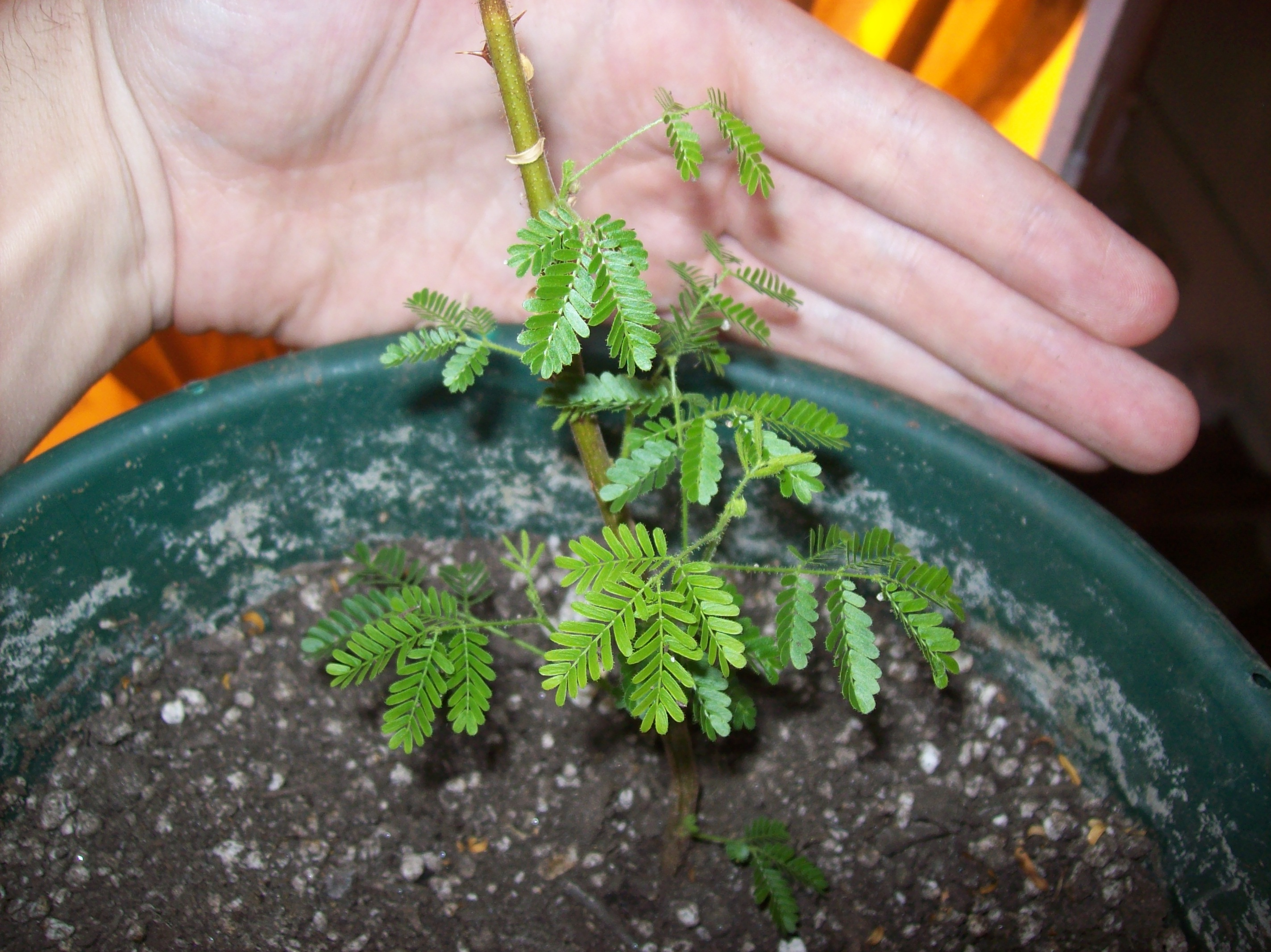
Mimosa tenuiflora

For outside planting, USDA Zone 9 or higher is recommended.

In nature, Mimosa tenuiflora "[...] fruits and seeds are disseminated by the wind in a radius of 5–8 m (16–26 ft) from the mother plant; rain carries them from slopes to lower plains and human activities contribute to their dissemination."

Scarification of the seed via mechanical means or by using sulfuric acid greatly increases the germination rate of the seeds over non-treatment. The seeds can be sown directly into holes in the ground or planted in prepared areas.

The seeds can germinate in temperatures ranging from 10 to 30 °C, but the highest germination rate occurs at around 25 °C (about 96%), even after four years of storage.

It is also possible to propagate Mimosa tenuiflora via cuttings.

Trimming adult Mimosa tenuiflora during the rainy season is not recommended as it can kill them.

== Legal status ==
=== United Nations ===
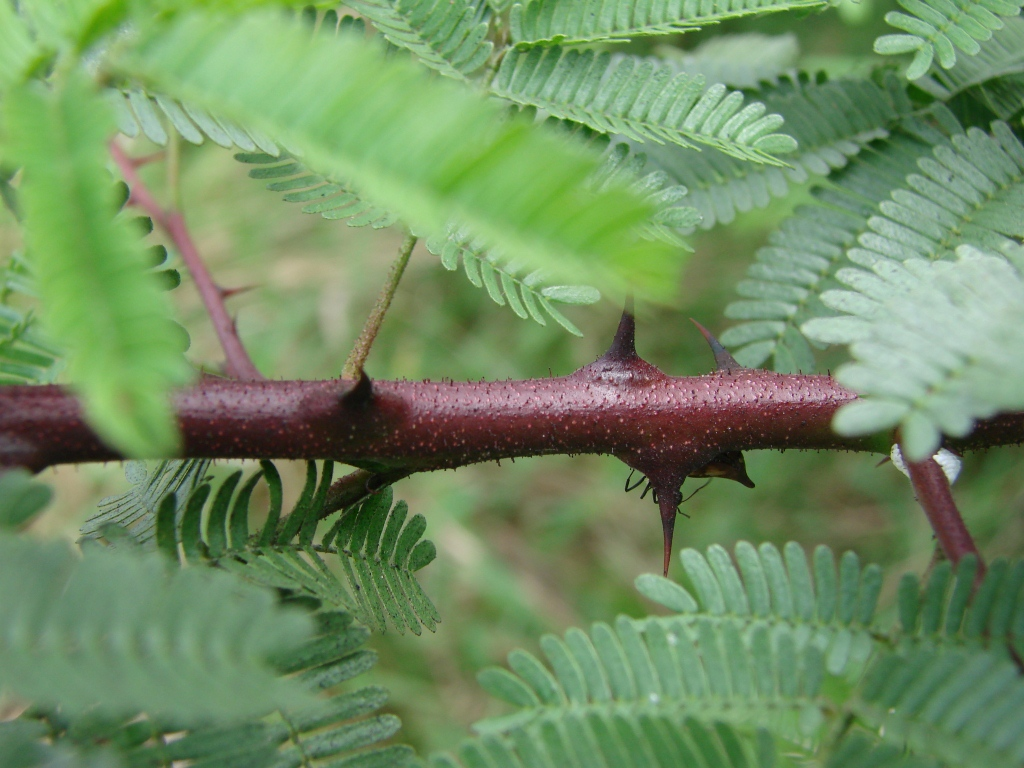
Article 32 makes an exception for Mimosa tenuiflora and other wild psychotropic plants, to protect use in religious rituals in case such plants themselves were in the future added to Schedule I.

Internationally, mescaline, dimethyltryptamine (DMT), and psilocin, are Schedule I drugs under the Convention on Psychotropic Substances. The Commentary on the Convention on Psychotropic Substances notes, however, that the plants containing them are not subject to international control:

"The cultivation of plants from which psychotropic substances are obtained is not controlled by the Vienna Convention... Neither the crown (fruit, mescal button) of the Peyote cactus nor the roots of the plant Mimosa hostilis nor Psilocybe mushrooms themselves are included in Schedule 1, but only their respective principals, mescaline, DMT, and psilocin."

== See also ==
- Dimethyltryptamine
- Psychedelic plants
