= Zinho (footballer, born 1965) =

Brazilian footballer

Personal information
- Full name: Sebastião Cândido da Silva
- Date of birth: 17 October 1965 (age 61)
- Place of birth: Picuí, Brazil
- Height: 1.66 m (5 ft 5 in)
- Positions: Attacking midfielder; forward

Youth career
- Olaria (Carnaúba dos Dantas)

Senior career*
Years	Team	Apps	(Gls)
1987–1991	ABC		
1991	→ Mogi Mirim (loan)		
1991	→ Santa Cruz (loan)		
1991–1994	Sport Recife		
1995–1997	Portuguesa		
1997–1998	Bahia		
1998	Ponte Preta		
1999	Araçatuba		
1999–2001	São Caetano		
2001	Portuguesa Santista		
2001	Etti Jundiaí		
2001	Goiás		
2002	Portuguesa Santista		
2002	Ceará		
2003	União São João		
2003	Figueirense		
2003	Campinense		
2004	Vila Nova		
2004	Campinense		
2005	Paranoá		
2005	Picuí		
2010	Atlético Araçatuba		

Managerial career
- 2005: Picuí
- 2007: Nacional de Patos
- 2008: Atlético de Cajazeiras
- 2008: Goiatuba
- 2010: Francana
- * Club domestic league appearances and goals

Sebastião Cândido da Silva (born 17 October 1965), better known as Zinho (and later Zinho Banderas), is a Brazilian former professional football player and manager who played as an attacking midfielder and a forward.

== Career ==
Born in Paraíba, Zinho started playing football in the neighboring state of Rio Grande do Norte, playing amateur tournaments in the city of Carnaúba dos Dantas. He went through selection at ABC de Natal, a club where he was champion in 1990. At Sport, he won titles again, especially the 1994 Copa do Nordeste. At Portuguesa, he was runner-up in the 1996 Brazilian Championship and one of the highlights of the competition, a feat he would repeat years later with São Caetano in 2000 and 2001. From then on, he played for several other clubs across the country, but without repeating his success.

== Managerial career ==
In 2005, Zinho founded Picuí Club in his hometown, a team where he was a player, coach and president. In 2007, he achieved a huge feat, becoming champion of Paraíba with the modest Nacional de Patos. Despite the achievement, he did not coach any team again.

== Personal life ==
In addition to his childhood nickname (Zinho), at AD São Caetano he received the nickname "Antonio Banderas" in reference to the actor who was successful at the time, an irony since Zinho was considered ugly among his club teammates. Being a man with good humor, the player incorporated Banderas into his nickname.

In 2016, he was arrested for non-payment of child support.

== Honours ==
=== Player ===
ABC

- Campeonato Potiguar: 1990

Sport

- Campeonato Pernambucano: 1991, 1992, 1994
- Copa do Nordeste: 1994

Individual

- 1989 Campeonato Potiguar top scorer: 18 goals

=== Manager ===
Nacional de Patos

- Campeonato Paraibano: 2007
