= LGBTQ rights in Rio Grande do Norte =

- Legal status: Legal since 1830, age of consent equalised
- Gender identity: Gender change allowed, official standard for altering legal sex doesn't require surgery since 2018
- Military: Allowed to serve openly
- Discrimination protections: Yes, since 2007

Family rights
- Recognition of relationships: Same-sex marriage since 2013
- Adoption: Legal since 2015

Lesbian, gay, bisexual, transgender and queer (LGBTQ) people in the Brazilian state of Rio Grande do Norte enjoy many of the same legal protections available to non-LGBTQ people. Homosexuality is legal in the state.

== Legality ==
Same-sex sexual activity has been legal in Brazil since 1830.

Same-sex marriage has been legal in Rio Grande do Norte since 2013 via a decision by the National Council of Justice, in compliance with a previous decision of the Supreme Federal Court in 2011.

Since 2015, same-sex adoption has been officially permitted in the state through a decision by the Supreme Federal Court.

== Hate crimes and discrimination law ==
The state of Rio Grande do Norte has a law against discrimination against LGBTQ people, namely State Law No. 9.036/2007. This law prohibits and punishes any discriminatory or offensive behaviour directed against homosexual, bisexual or transgender citizens.

In 2019, discrimination based on sexual orientation and gender identity was banned through a decision by the Supreme Federal Court.

In 2023, state deputy Eudiane Macedo (PV) introduced a bill to prohibit the state government from appointing individuals convicted of homophobia or transphobia to public office. The bill was signed into law by Governor Fátima Bezerra, of the Workers' Party, on 18 July 2025.

== Gender identity and expression ==
The Supreme Federal Court of Brazil ruled on 1 March 2018, that a transgender person has the right to change their official name and sex without the need of surgery or professional evaluation, just by self-declaration of their psychosocial identity.

Since October 2023, Rio Grande do Norte allows non-binary people judicial gender change. The civil registration rectification action was opened during a service mutirão carried out by the institution in Parnamirim. The decision authorizes the rectification of the name on the birth certificate and that it begins to indicate the gender of the person as "non-binary".

On 21 December 2023, the Legislative Assembly of Rio Grande do Norte approved a bill to prohibit transgender people from competing in sports according to their gender identity. In 13 January 2024, the bill was vetoed by Governor Fátima Bezerra.

On 9 November 2023, Governor Fátima Bezerra signed a law requiring companies receiving state government tax incentives to reserve 5% of job openings for trans and travesti people. On 28 June 2024, the governor signed a decree reinforcing the law's implementation. On 30 October 2024, the law and the decree were unanimously struck down by the Court of Justice of Rio Grande do Norte.

=== Access to restrooms ===
In 2012, the Federal University of Rio Grande do Norte (URFN) was the first federal university in Brazil to install unisex restrooms.

In October 2020, following a lawsuit filed by the Federal Public Defender's Office (DPU), the Court of Justice of Rio Grande do Norte ordered a train station in Natal to pay 12,000 reais in compensation after denying a trans woman access to the women's restroom. According to the case records, a security guard at the station asked the woman to leave the women's restroom and use the men's, even after she showed him her ID card displaying her female name and gender.

On 20 April 2022, transgender city councilwoman Thabatta Pimenta was prevented from using the women's restroom at a shopping mall in Natal. She filed a lawsuit against the mall, resulting in a ruling by the state Court of Justice on 8 April 2024, ordering the mall to pay 5,000 reais in compensation.

On 17 September 2024, the state Legislative Assembly passed a bill banning the installation of unisex restrooms in the state. The bill has not yet been signed into law or vetoed by Governor Fátima Bezerra. The bill was proposed by Representative Coronel Azevedo, of the Liberal Party, who criticized URFN's unisex restroom policy.

== Censorship of LGBTQ issues ==
=== Education ===
On 9 November 2023, the state Legislative Assembly passed a bill banning gender-neutral language in state schools. The bill was vetoed by Governor Fátima Bezerra.

On 21 December 2023, the Natal City Council approved a bill banning gender-neutral language in the city's schools. On 19 January 2024, the bill was signed into law by Mayor Álvaro Costa Dias, of the Republicans party.

=== Pride parades ===
On 9 November 2023, City Councilwoman Camila Araújo, of the Brazil Union party, introduced a bill to ban the participation of minors in LGBTQ parades in Natal. On 26 August 2026, the bill was approved by the City Council, drawing criticism from councilwomen Thabatta Pimenta, Samanda Alves, and Brisa Bracchi. The bill has not yet been signed into law or vetoed by the city's mayor.

== Summary table ==
Same-sex sexual activity legal	Yes (Since 1830)
Equal age of consent	Yes (Since 1830)
Anti-discrimination laws in employment only	Yes (Since 2007)
Anti-discrimination laws in the provision of goods and services	Yes (Since 2007)
Anti-discrimination laws in all other areas (Incl. indirect discrimination, hate speech)	Yes (Since 2007)
LGBTQ subjects free from censorship in education	Yes / No (Gender-neutral language banned in Natal since 2024)
Same-sex marriages	Yes (Since 2013)
Recognition of same-sex couples	Yes (Since 2011)
Stepchild adoption by same-sex couples	Yes (Nationwide since 2015)
Joint adoption by same-sex couples	Yes (Nationwide since 2015)
LGBTQ people allowed to serve openly in the military	Yes
Right to change legal gender	Yes (Since 2008; gender self-identification since 2018)
Third gender option	Yes (Since 2023, court decision required)
Conversion therapy by medical professionals banned	Yes (Since 1999 for homosexuals and since 2018 for transgender people)
Access to IVF for lesbians	Yes (Since 2013)
Commercial surrogacy for gay male couples	No (Banned for any couple regardless of sexual orientation)
MSMs allowed to donate blood	Yes (Since 2020)
