= Yuremamine =

Names
- Other names Yuremamine

Identifiers
| CAS Number | 883973-98-6 |
| 3D model (JSmol) | Interactive image |
| ChemSpider | 62702341 |
| PubChem CID | 122386737 |
- InChI: InChI=1S/C27H28N2O6/c1-29(2)10-9-17-16-5-3-4-6-19(16)28-24(17)23-18-8-7-15(30)13-22(18)35-27(26(23)34)14-11-20(31)25(33)21(32)12-14/h3-8,11-13,23,26-28,30-34H,9-10H2,1-2H3/t23-,26+,27-/m0/s1 Key: KXDXQDYTLNRCHP-RNJDCESWSA-N
- SMILES: CN(C)CCC1=C(NC2=CC=CC=C12)[C@@H]1[C@H](O)[C@H](OC2=C1C=CC(O)=C2)C1=CC=CC=C1

Properties
| Chemical formula | C_{27}H_{28}N_{2}O_{6} |
| Molar mass | 476.529 g·mol^{−1} |
- Except where otherwise noted, data are given for materials in their standard state (at 25 °C [77 °F], 100 kPa). verify (what is ?) Infobox references

Yuremamine is a phytoindole alkaloid which was isolated from the bark of Mimosa tenuiflora in 2005, and erroneously assigned a pyrrolo[1,2-a]indole structure that was thought to represent a new class of indole alkaloids. However, in 2015, the bioinspired total synthesis of yuremamine revealed its structure to be a flavonoid derivative. It was also noted in the original isolation of yuremamine that the alkaloid occurs naturally as a purple solid, but total synthesis revealed that yuremamine as a free base is colorless, and the formation of a trifluoroacetate salt during HPLC purification is what led to the purple appearance.. The indole group shares the same structure as that of DMT, which is also found in Mimosa tenuiflora and lends it its psychoactive properties.

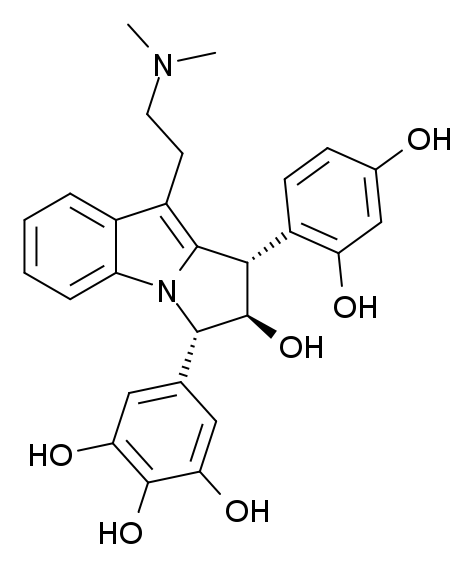
Originally proposed chemical structure of yuremamine
