= Mercedes Dantas Lacombe =

Argentine poet (1888–1966)

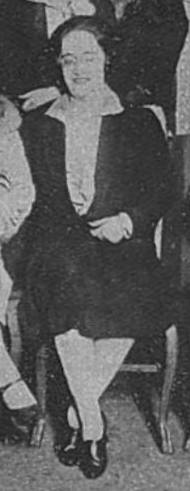
- At the Argentine Women's Club in 1926
- Born: 5 July 1888; Buenos Aires, Argentina
- Died: 26 March 1966 (aged 77); Buenos Aires, Argentina
- Burial place: La Recoleta Cemetery
- Education: University of Buenos Aires
- Occupation(s): Poet, teacher

Mercedes Dantas Lacombe (1888–1966) was an Argentine poet, teacher, and feminist, a co-founder of the Argentine Women's Club.

== Biography ==
Mercedes Dantas Lacombe was born in Buenos Aires on 5 July 1888. She attended the University of Buenos Aires, and graduated as a teacher and PhD from its Faculty of Philosophy and Letters.

She wrote for several magazines and newspapers, such as El Hogar, La Nota, Nosotros, Caras y Caretas, Mundo Argentino, and La Razón. In 1925, she published her first book of poetry entitled De mi senda (Of My Path). In 1935, she published the book El grumete de la Santa María (cuentos históricos infantiles) (The Cabin Boy of the Santa María: Historical Children's Stories).

She was a teacher at Normal School No. 8 for Women Teachers, and wrote the lyrics for its school hymn, which had music by Raúl Espoile.

She was a co-founder of the Argentine Women's Club, and became its first president on 19 August 1921. During her term, in December 1928, the club sponsored the Third International Women's Congress at the Escuela Superior de Comercio Carlos Pellegrini.

On 17 June 1928, she received a scroll signed by all members of the Argentine Women's Club to honor her for her effective performance.

== Death ==
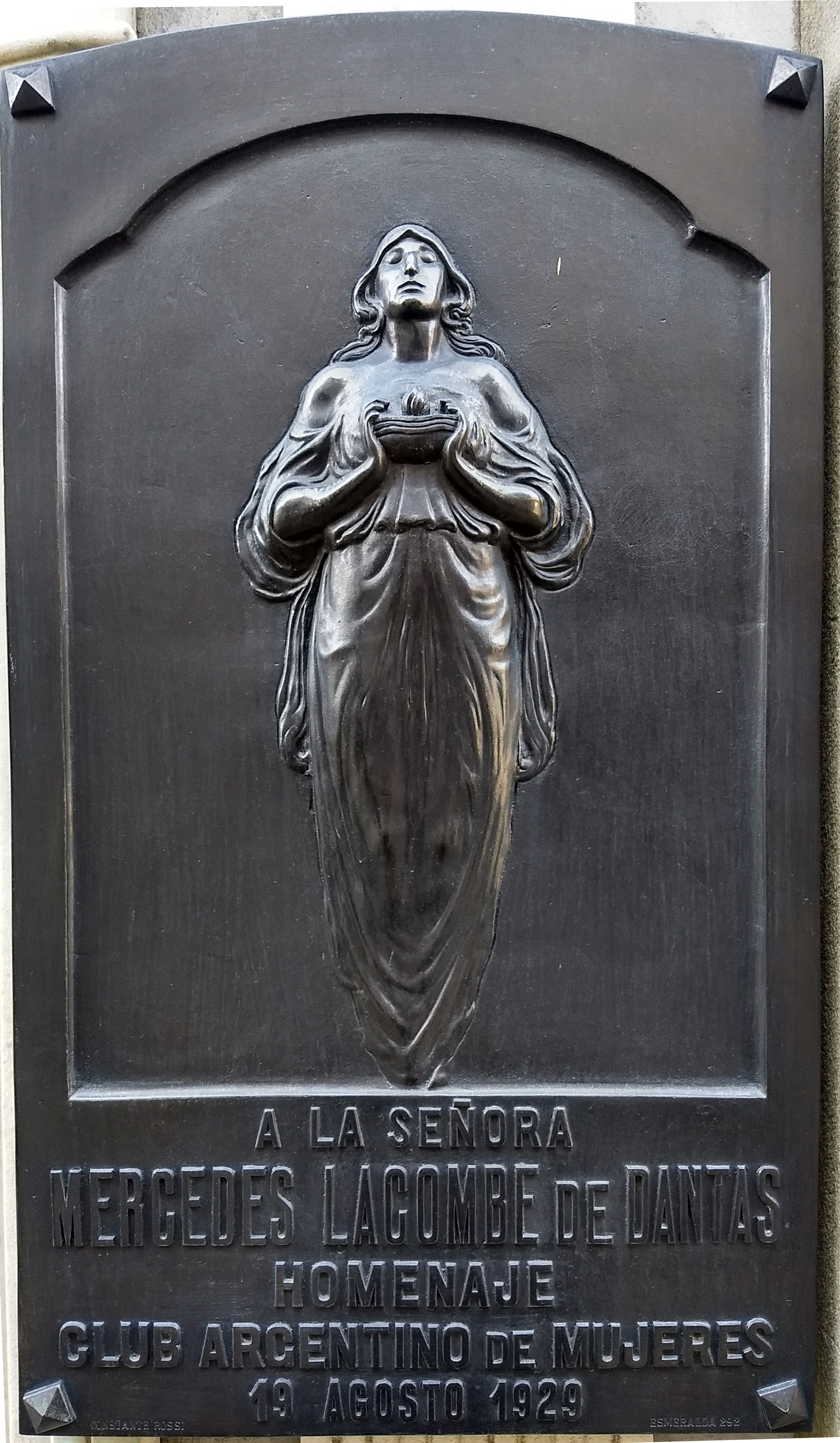
Plaque in honor of Mercedes Dantas Lacombe from the Argentine Women's Club at La Recoleta Cemetery

Mercedes Dantas Lacombe died in Buenos Aires on 26 March 1966 and was interred in her family's mausoleum at La Recoleta Cemetery, next to her parents Manuel Dantas Mugica and Mercedes Lacombe, and her brother José María.
