= Kukulkanin =

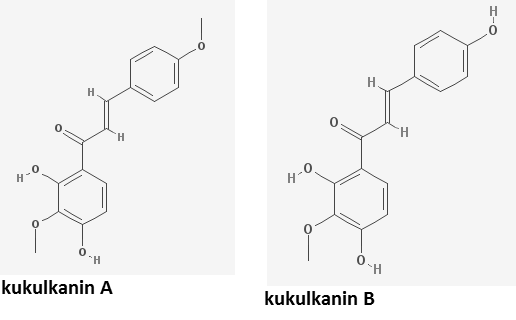
Kukulkanin A and B

Kukulkanins are chalcones isolated from Mexican Mimosa.
