= Leandro (footballer, born August 1987) =

Brazilian footballer

Personal information
- Full name: Leandro Teixeira Dantas
- Date of birth: August 17, 1987 (age 39)
- Place of birth: Itaguaí, Brazil
- Height: 1.80 m (5 ft 11 in)
- Position: Midfielder

Team information
- Current team: Oeste

Youth career
- América-RJ

Senior career*
Years	Team	Apps	(Gls)
2003–2007	América-RJ		
2007	Vegalta Sendai		
2007	→ FC Perada Fukushima (loan)		
2009–2010	Duque de Caxias	20	(2)
2010–2011	Fluminense		
2010	→ Duque de Caxias (loan)	17	(0)
2011	→ Duque de Caxias (loan)	29	(1)
2012	Boavista-RJ		
2013	Macaé		
2013–	Oeste		
- * Club domestic league appearances and goals

Leandro Teixeira Dantas, or Leandro (born August 17, 1987) is a Brazilian football player who currently plays for Oeste. Leandro was born in Itaguaí, Rio de Janeiro.
