= Carnaúba dos Dantas =

Municipality in Rio Grande do Norte, Brazil

- Municipality
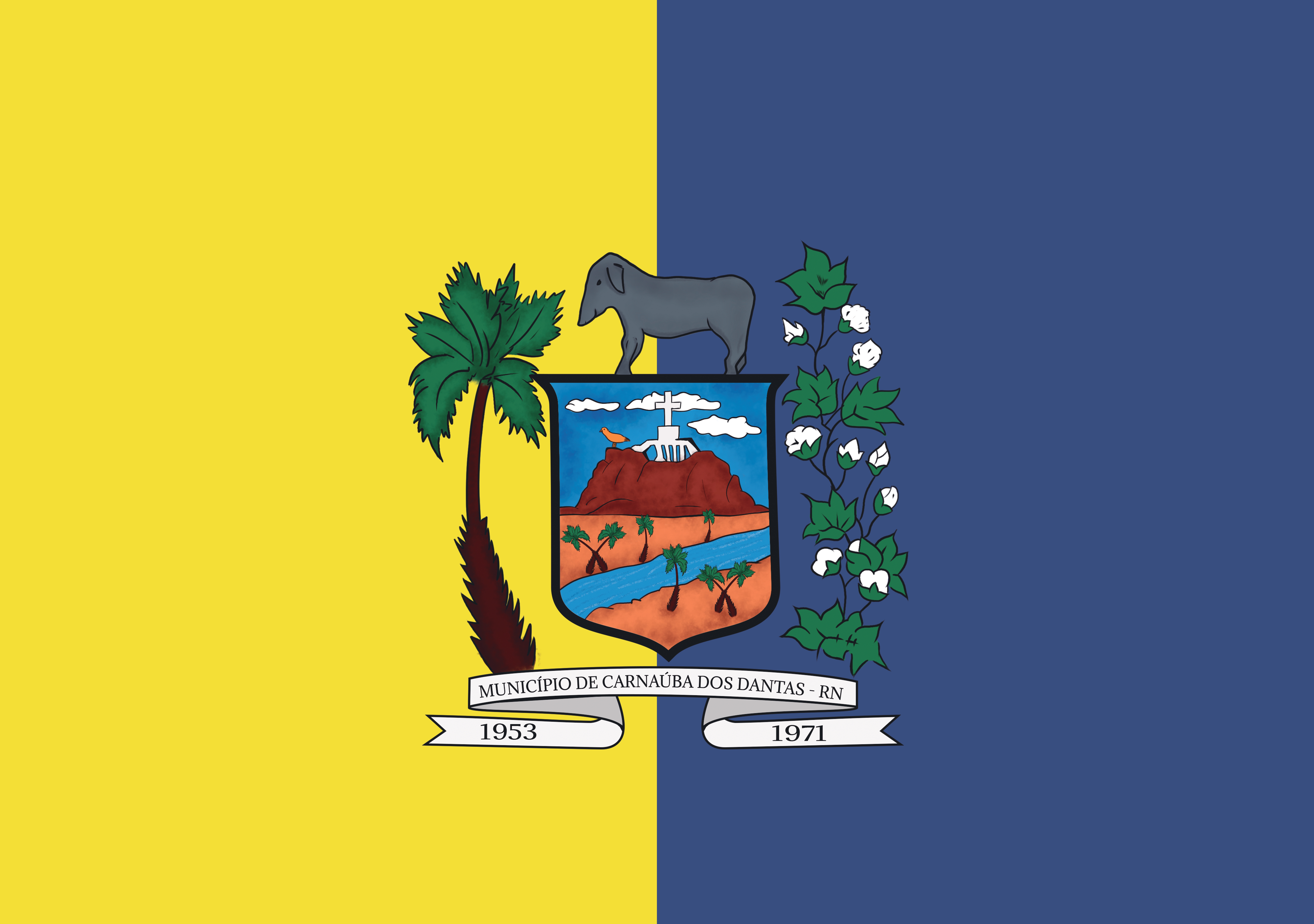
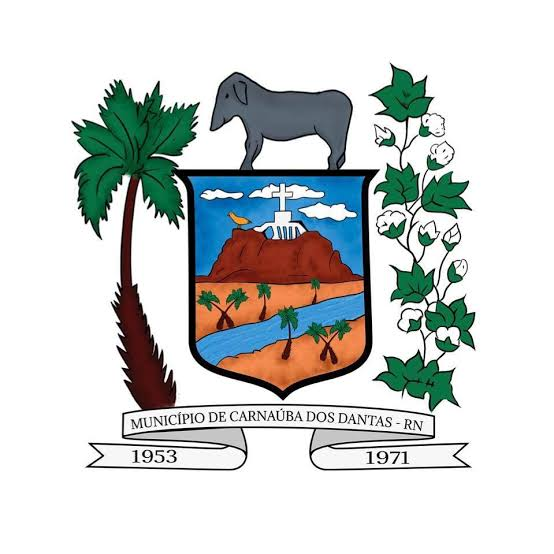
- Flag Coat of arms

- Location in Brazil
- Coordinates: 6°33′S 36°35′W
- Country: Brazil
- Region: Nordeste
- State: Rio Grande do Norte
- Mesoregion: Central Potiguar

Population (2022)
  - Total: 7.922
- Time zone: UTC −3

Carnaúba dos Dantas is a municipality in the state of Rio Grande do Norte in the Northeast region of Brazil. With an area of 246.308 square kilometers (95.100 sq mi), of which 2.0242 square kilometres (0.7815 sq mi) is urban, it is located 234,1 km from Natal, the state capital, and 1.606 km from Brasília, the federal capital. Its population in the 2022 demographic census was 7.922 inhabitants, according to the Brazilian Institute of Geography and Statistics (IBGE), ranking as the 78nd most populous municipality in the state of Rio Grande do Norte.

== History ==
The first records date back to ancient times, when the Kiriri, natives of the region, dominated the vast expanses of the Acauã Backlands. However, the true story begins to take shape with the arrival of the colonizers, among them Lieutenant Francisco Fernandes de Souza, around 1700.

It is with the prominent figure of Caetano Dantas Correia that Carnaúba dos Dantas truly begins to take shape. Described by historians like Luiz da Câmara Cascudo in his book "Nomes da Terra", Caetano Dantas Correia, originally from Pernambuco, founded the Carnaúba Farm around 1740. His entrepreneurial vision and commitment to progress were fundamental in establishing the foundations of this community.

The Carnaúba Farm not only became a center of economic activity but also a reference point for the growth and development of the region. Under the leadership of Antônio Dantas de Maria, a direct descendant of Caetano Dantas, the chapel of São José was built in the early 20th century, marking the emergence of the settlement around it.

The name Carnaúba dos Dantas pays homage to the rich cultural and historical heritage of this municipality. The imposing carnaúba trees, abundant in the region, symbolize the intrinsic connection with nature, while the surname "Dantas" evokes the lineage of the founders and the values they represented.

== Geography ==
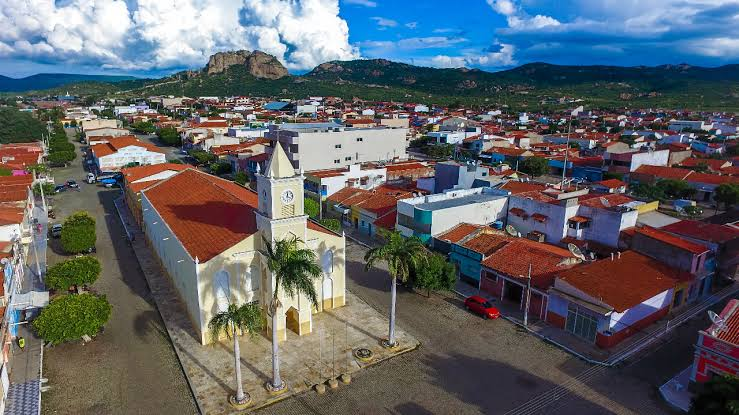
View of the city of Carnaúba dos Dantas by aerial photography

The territory of Carnaúba dos Dantas covers 246.308 square kilometers (95.100 sq mi), of which 2.0242 square kilometres (0.7815 sq mi) constitutes the urban area. It sits at an average altitude of 306 meters above sea level. Carnaúba dos Dantas borders these municipalities: to the north, Acari, Currais Novos, and the state of Paraíba; to the south, Parelhas and Paraíba; to the east, Paraíba; and to the west, Jardim do Seridó and Acari. The city is located 175 km from the state capital Natal, and 1,606 km from the federal capital Brasília. Under the territorial division established in 2017 by the Brazilian Institute of Geography and Statistics (IBGE), the municipality belongs to the immediate geographical region of Currais Novos, within the intermediate region of Caicó. Previously, under the microregion and mesoregion divisions, it was part of the microregion of Seridó Oriental in the mesoregion of Central Potiguar.

Its terrain is mainly formed by plateaus, and its climate is classified as semi-arid, with an annual rainfall precipitation of 550 mm. The region is characterized primarily by two types of caatinga vegetation. The Hyperxerophilous Caatinga consists of drier vegetation, dominated by an abundance of cacti and low, scattered plants. The Subdesertic Caatinga of Seridó represents the driest type of vegetation in the state, composed of sparse shrubs and small trees with pronounced xerophytic adaptations.

Among the most common plant species in these environments are pereiro (Aspidosperma pyrifolium), faveleiro (Cnidoscolus quercifolius), facheiro (Pilosocereus pachycladus), macambira (Bromelia laciniosa), mandacaru (Cereus jamacaru), xique-xique (Pilosocereus polygonus), and jurema-preta (Mimosa tenuiflora). Carnaúba dos Dantas is located in an area susceptible to desertification classified as "Very Severe" according to the National Plan to Combat Desertification. It includes a conservation area, the Private Natural Heritage Reserve – RPRN Sernativo – created by Federal Ordinance No. 1922 of June 5, 1996. This reserve aims to manage land use and protect the Caatinga ecosystem, covering an area of 378.5 hectares with a legal reserve of 75.7 hectares.

The municipality of Carnaúba dos Dantas lies entirely within the watershed of the Piranhas-Açu river basin, being bathed by the sub-basin of the Carnaúba River. The main tributaries are the streams Malhada Vermelha, do Ermo, Boa Vista, and do Olho d'água. The largest reservoir in the municipality is the public reservoir Monte Alegre, with a capacity of 1,421,600 cubic meters of water, fed by the Olho d'água River.

== Demography ==
In the 2022 census, the municipality had a population of 7,992 inhabitants and ranked 82nd in the state that year (out of 167 municipalities), with 50.28% female and 49.71% male, resulting in a sex ratio of 98.90 (9,890 men for every 10,000 women), compared to 7,429 inhabitants in the 2010 census (81.14% living in the urban area), when it held the 86th state position. Between the 2010 and 2022 censuses, the population of Carnaúba dos Dantas changed at an annual geometric growth rate of 0.61%. Regarding age group in the 2022 census, 68.55% of the inhabitants were between 15 and 64 years old, 19.89% were under fifteen, and 11.57% were 65 or older. The population density in 2022 was 32.45 inhabitants per square kilometer. There were 2,800 housing units with an average of 2.85 inhabitants per household.

The municipality's Human Development Index (HDI-M) was considered medium, according to data from the United Nations Development Programme (UNDP). According to the 2010 report published in 2013, its value was 0.659, ranking 20th in the state and 2,924th nationally (out of 5,565 municipalities), and the Gini coefficient rose from 0.4 in 2003 to 0.4 in 2010. Considering only the longevity index, its value is 0.769, the income index is 0.624, and the education index is 0.577.

== See also ==
- List of municipalities in Rio Grande do Norte
