= Acari, Rio Grande do Norte =

Municipality in Rio Grande do Norte, Brazil

Coordinates: 6.4599823°S 36.6410138°W

- Municipality
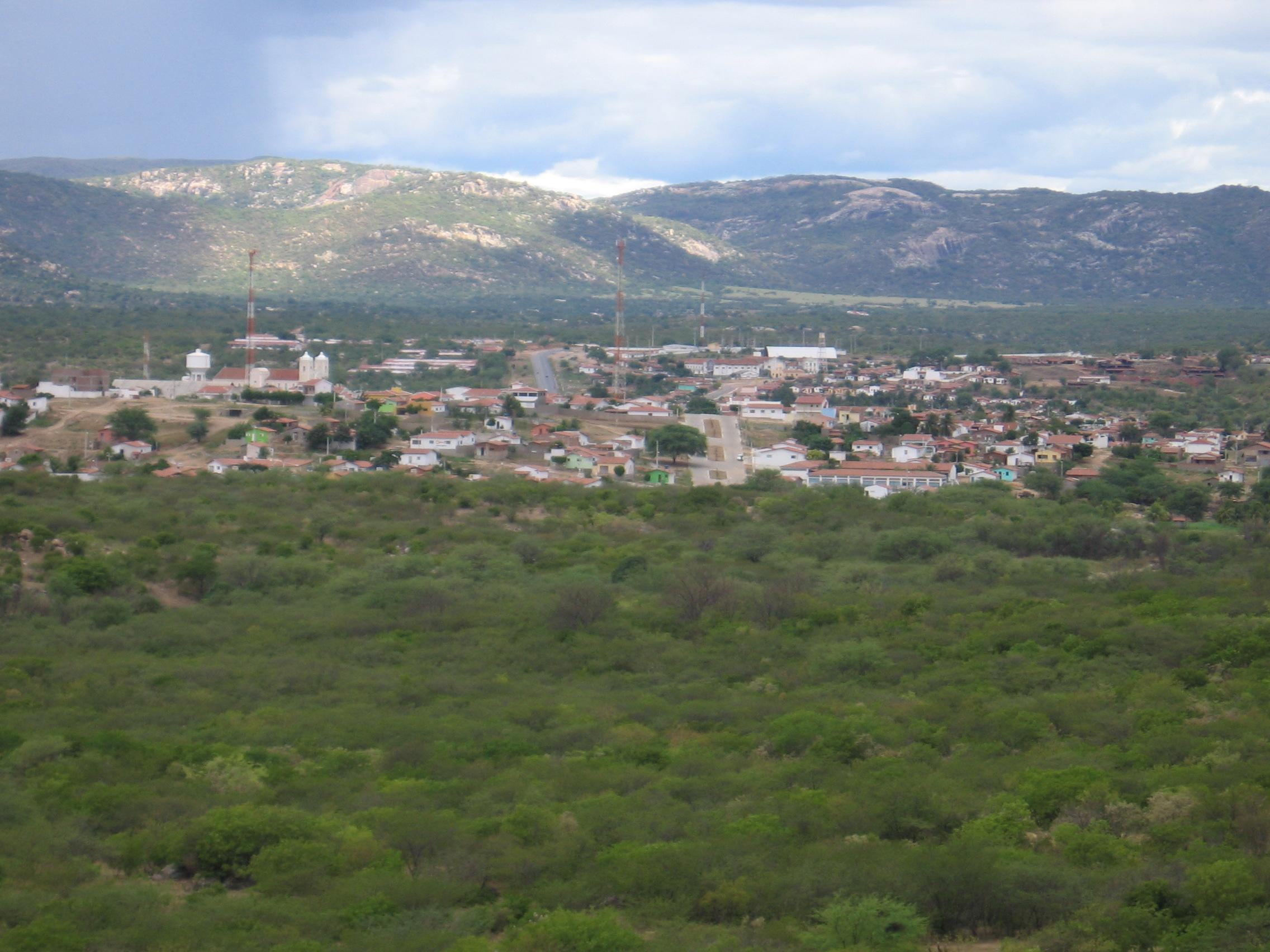
- Acari skyline.

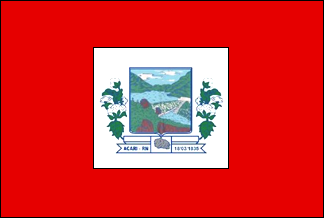
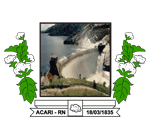
- Flag Coat of arms
- Interactive map of Acari, Rio Grande do Norte
- Country: Brazil
- Region: Nordeste
- State: Rio Grande do Norte
- Mesoregion: Central Potiguar

Population (2022)
  - Total: 10,597
- Time zone: UTC -3

Acari is a municipality in the state of Rio Grande do Norte in the Northeast Region of Brazil. With an area of 608.466 square kilometers (234.930 sq mi), of which 2.0738 square kilometres (0.8007 sq mi) is urban, it is located 175 km from Natal, the state capital, and 1,609 km from Brasília, the federal capital. Its population in the 2022 demographic census was 10,597 inhabitants, according to the Brazilian Institute of Geography and Statistics (IBGE), ranking as the 60th most populous municipality in the state of Rio Grande do Norte.

== Geography ==
The territory of Acari covers 608.466 square kilometers (234.930 sq mi), of which 2.0738 square kilometres (0.8007 sq mi) constitutes the urban area. It sits at an average altitude of 270 meters above sea level. The city is located 175 km from the state capital Natal, and 1,609 km from the federal capital Brasília.

Under the territorial division established in 2017 by the Brazilian Institute of Geography and Statistics (IBGE), the municipality belongs to the immediate geographical region of Currais Novos, within the intermediate region of Caicó. Previously, under the microregion and mesoregion divisions, it was part of the microregion of Seridó Oriental in the mesoregion of Central Potiguar.

== Demographics ==
In the 2022 census, the municipality had a population of 10,597 inhabitants and ranked only 60th in the state that year (out of 167 municipalities), with 51.77% female and 48.23% male, resulting in a sex ratio of 93.16 (9,316 men for every 10,000 women), compared to 11,035 inhabitants in the 2010 census (80.67% living in the urban area), when it held the 55th state position. Between the 2010 and 2022 censuses, the population of Acari registered a growth of just over -4%, with an annual geometric growth rate of -0.34%. Regarding age group in the 2022 census, 68.58% of the inhabitants were between 15 and 64 years old, 17.03% were under fifteen, and 14.4% were 65 or older. The population density in 2022 was 17.42 inhabitants per square kilometer, with an average of 2.77 inhabitants per household.

The municipality's Human Development Index (HDI-M) is considered medium, according to data from the United Nations Development Programme (PNUD). According to the 2010 report published in 2013, its value was 0.679, ranking ninth in the state and 2,462th nationally (out of 5,565 municipalities), and the Gini coefficient rose from 0.41 in 2003 to 0.49 in 2010. Considering only the longevity index, its value is 0.779, the income index is 0.633, and the education index is 0.634.

== See also ==
- List of municipalities in Rio Grande do Norte
