= 2022 São Paulo general election =

Gubernatorial election held in Brazil

2022 São Paulo state election
- 2 October 2022 (first round); 30 October 2022 (second round)
- Opinion polls
- Turnout: 78.37% (first round); 78.93% (second round)
- Gubernatorial election
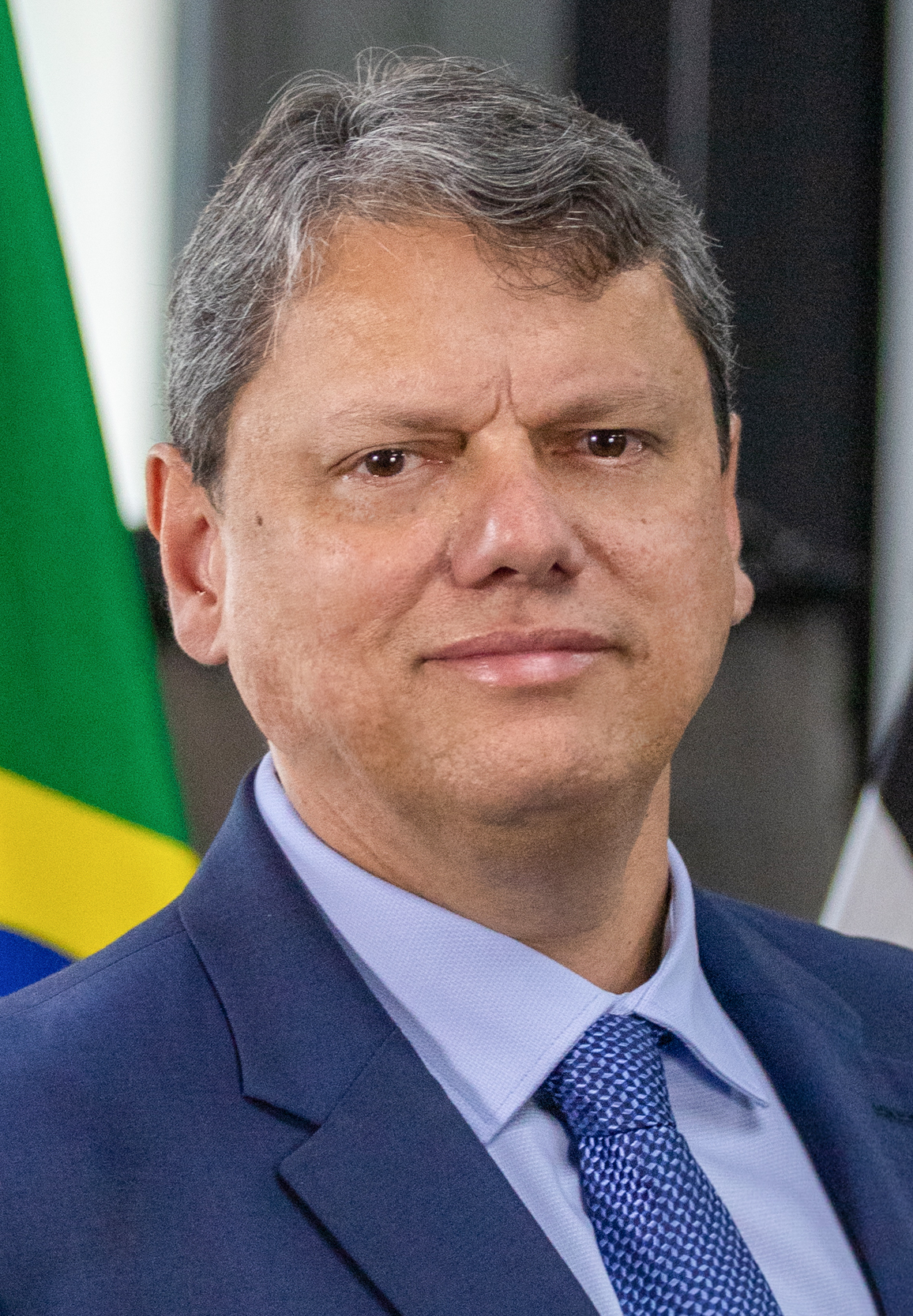

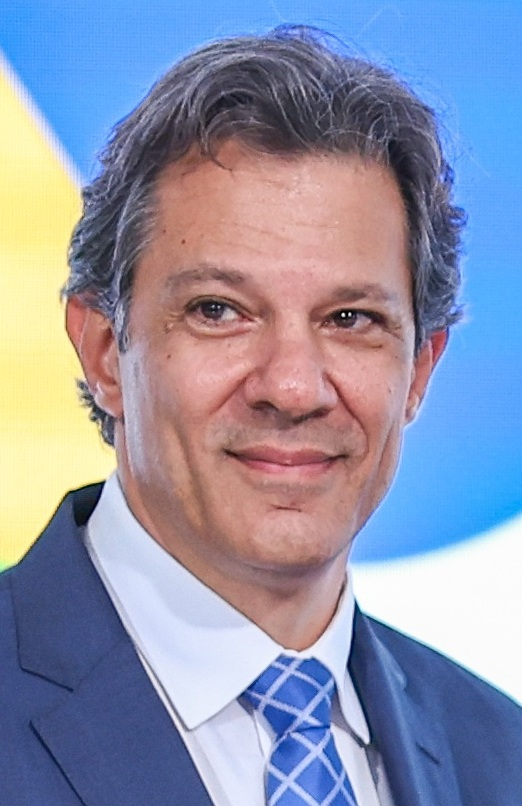
Candidate	Tarcísio de Freitas	Fernando Haddad
Party	Republicanos	PT
Alliance	São Paulo Can Do More	Together for São Paulo
Running mate	Felicio Ramuth	Lúcia França
Popular vote	13,480,190	10,908,972
Percentage	55.27%	44.73%
- Candidate with the most votes per municipality in the 2nd round (645): Tarcísio de Freitas (566 municipalities); Fernando Haddad (79 municipalities)
Governor before election
Rodrigo Garcia
PSDB
Elected Governor
Tarcísio de Freitas
Republicanos
- Parliamentary election
- All 94 seats of the Legislative Assembly
Party	Leader	Vote %	Seats	+/–
Legislative Assembly
PL	Ricardo Madalena	16.04	19	+12
PT	Maria Izabel Noronha	13.90	18	+8
PSDB	Analice Fernandes	8.07	8	+2
Republicanos	Altair Moraes	7.24	8	+2
UNIÃO	Milton Leite Filho	7.05	8	−14
PSOL	Carlos Giannazi	5.66	5	+1
PODE	Márcio Giudicio	4.37	4	+1
PSD	Marta Costa	3.90	4	+2
MDB	Jorge Caruso	3.79	4	+2
PP	Antonio Olim	3.39	3	−1
PSC	None	2.65	1	+1
Cidadania	Roberto Morais	2.31	3	+1
NOVO	Sérgio Victor	1.35	1	−3
This lists parties that won seats. See the complete results below.
- Senatorial election
- 2 October 2022 (one-only round)
- Opinion polls
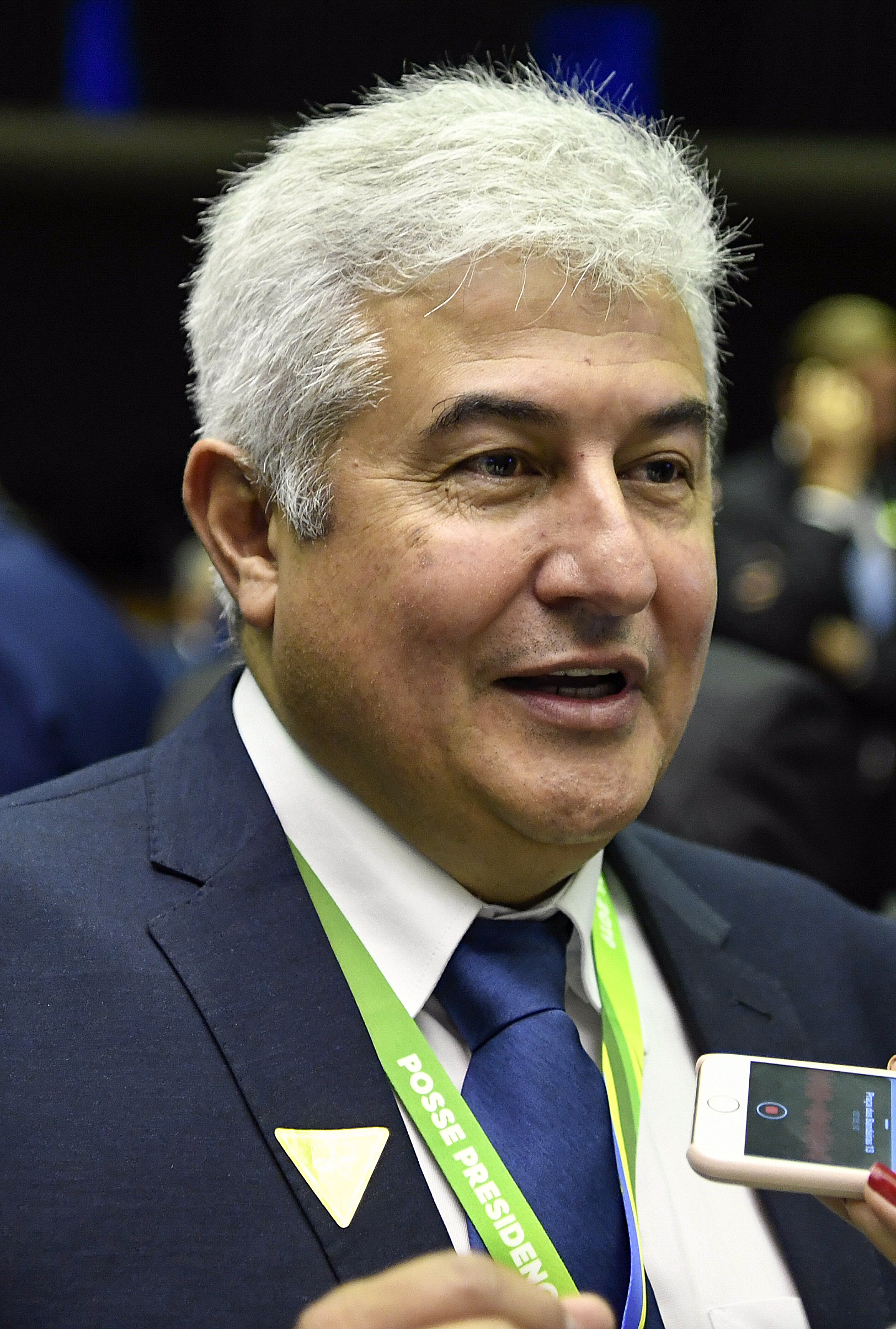

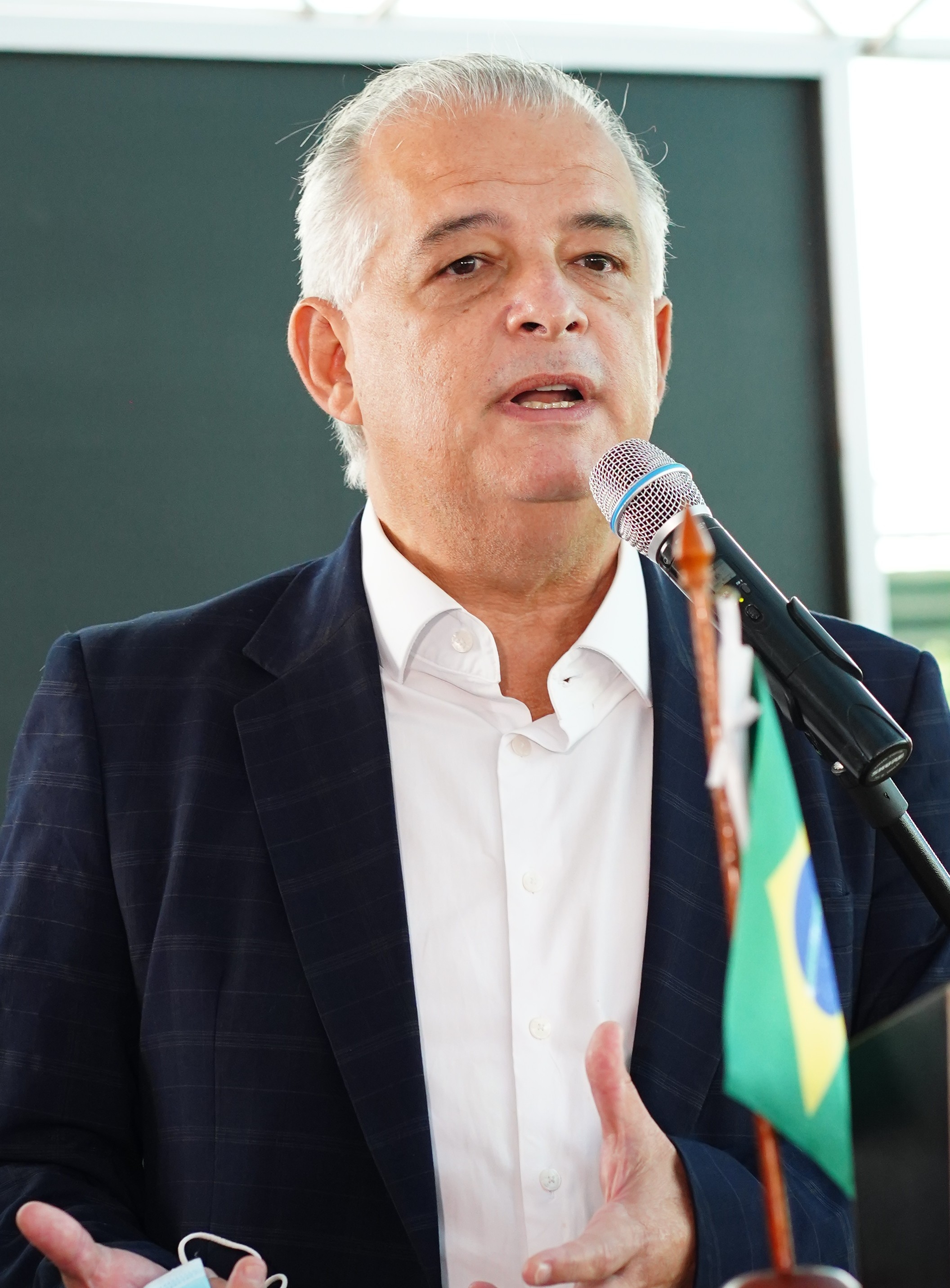

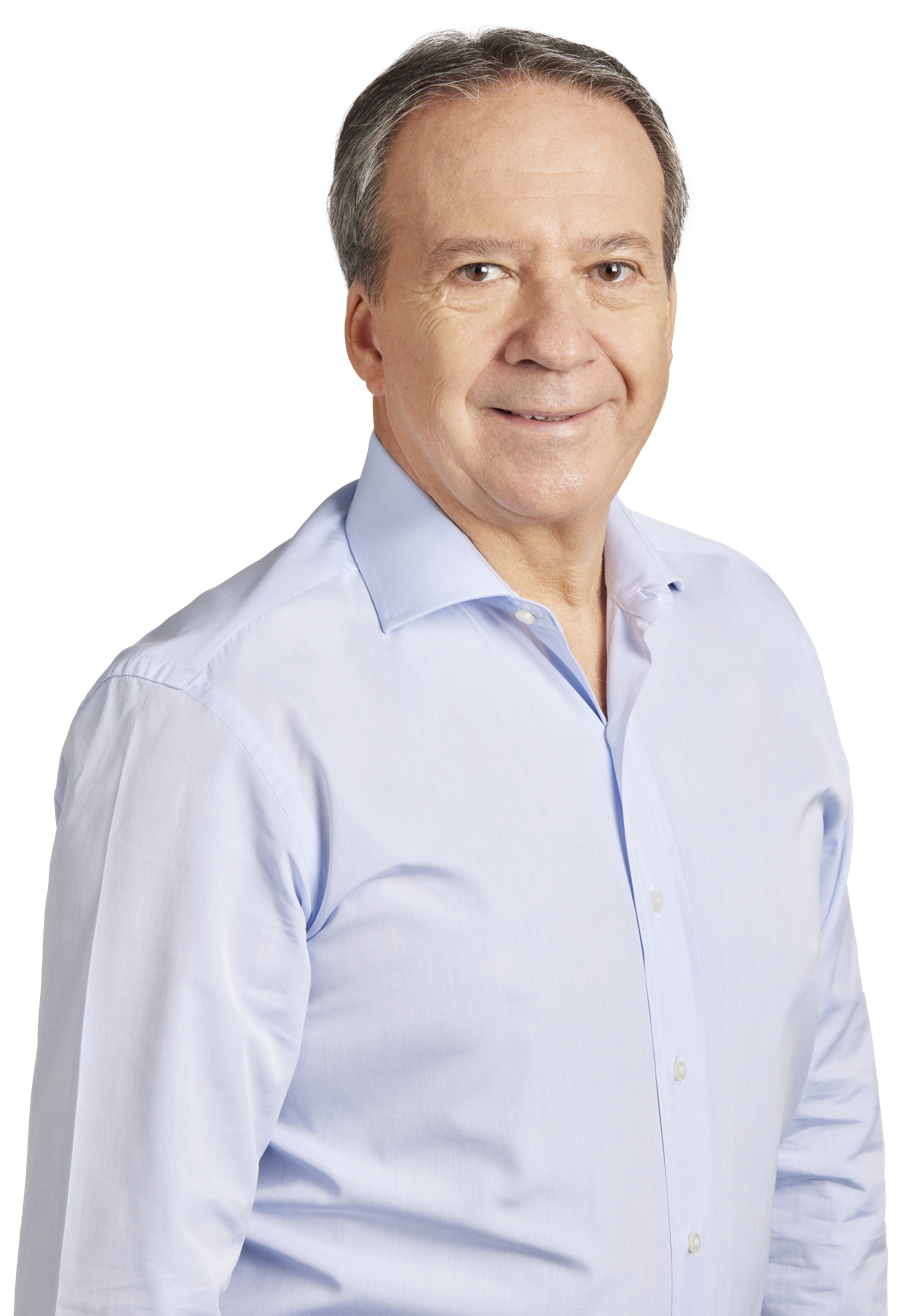
Candidate	Marcos Pontes	Márcio França	Edson Aparecido
Party	PL	PSB	MDB
Alliance	São Paulo Can Do More	Together for São Paulo	São Paulo Forward
Popular vote	10,714,913	7,822,518	1,655,224
Percentage	49.68%	36.27%	7.67%
- Candidate with the most votes per municipality (645): Marcos Pontes (564 municipalities); Márcio França (78 municipalities); Edson Aparecido (3 municipalities)
Senator before election
José Serra
PSDB
Elected Senator
Marcos Pontes
PL

The 2022 São Paulo state election took place in the state of São Paulo, Brazil on 2 October 2022 and 30 October 2022 (second round, if necessary). Voters elected a Governor, Vice Governor, one Senator, 70 representatives for the Chamber of Deputies, and 94 Legislative Assembly members. The incumbent Governor, Rodrigo Garcia, of the Brazilian Social Democracy Party (PSDB), was eligible for a second term and ran for reelection.

Garcia was elected Vice Governor in 2018 and took office as the governor on 1 April 2022, with the resignation of the incumbent João Doria, due to his then candidacy for the Presidency of Republic, which he ended up withdrawing on 23 May 2022. Garcia was defeated on his reelection bid and Tarcísio de Freitas was elected as governor of São Paulo, ending the 28 year consecutive rule of the Brazilian Social Democracy Party on the state. For the election to the Federal Senate, the seat occupied by the incumbent senator José Serra (PSDB) since 2015, was at dispute, but he decided to run for a seat at the Chamber of Deputies. However, he wasn't elected. Marcos Pontes, a member of the Liberal Party, was elected to replace Serra in the Federal Senate.

The governor and vice governor elected in this election will serve a term that is a few days longer. This is due to Constitutional Amendment No. 111, which amended the Constitution of Brazil and stipulated that the mandate of elected governors will begin on 1 January 2023 and end on 6 January 2027.

== Electoral calendar ==
Note: This section only presents the main dates of the 2022 electoral calendar, check the TSE official website (in Portuguese) and other official sources for detailed information.

Electoral calendar
15 May	Start of crowdfunding of candidates
20 July to 5 August	Party conventions for choosing candidates and coalitions
16 August to 30 September	Period of exhibition of free electoral propaganda on radio, television and on the internet related to the first round
2 October	First round of 2022 elections
7 October to 28 October	Period of exhibition of free electoral propaganda on radio, television and on the internet related to the second round
30 October	Second round of 2022 elections
until 19 December	Delivery of electoral diplomas for those who were elected in the 2022 elections by the Brazilian Election Justice

== Legislative Assembly ==
The result of the last state election and the current situation in the Legislative Assembly of São Paulo is given below:

Affiliation	Members		+/–
Affiliation	Elected	Current	+/–
PL	6	19	▲13
PSDB	8	13	▲5
PT	10	10	Steady
UNIÃO	New	8	▲8
PODE	4	7	▲3
Republicanos	6	7	▲1
PP	4	5	▲1
MDB	3	3	Steady
PSD	2	3	▲1
PSOL	4	3	▼1
Cidadania	2	2	Steady
Avante	1	2	▲1
PCdoB	1	2	▲1
PDT	1	2	▲1
NOVO	4	2	▼2
Agir	0	1	▲1
PRTB	0	1	▲1
Patriota	1	1	Steady
REDE	1	1	Steady
Solidarity	1	1	Steady
PSB	8	1	▼7
PHS	1	0	▼1
PROS	1	0	▼1
PV	1	0	▼1
PTB	2	0	▼2
DEM	7	0	▼7
PSL	15	0	▼15
Total	94		–

== Gubernatorial candidates ==
The party conventions began on July 20 and will continue until 5 August. The following political parties have already confirmed their candidacies. Political parties have until 15 August 2022 to formally register their candidates.

=== Candidates in runoff ===
Party	Candidate	Most relevant political office or occupation	Party	Running mate	Coalition	Electoral number	TV time per party/coalition	Refs.
Republicans	Tarcísio de Freitas	Minister of Infrastructure of Brazil (2019–2022)	Social Democratic Party (PSD)	Felicio Ramuth	São Paulo Can Do More: Social Christian Party (PSC); Brazilian Labour Party (PTB); Social Democratic Party (PSD); Liberal Party (PL); Party of National Mobilization (PMN)	10	2min and 24sec	
Workers' Party (PT)	Fernando Haddad	Mayor of São Paulo (2013–2017)	Brazilian Socialist Party (PSB)	Lúcia França	Together for São Paulo: Brazil of Hope; Workers' Party (PT); Communist Party of Brazil (PCdoB); Green Party (PV); PSOL-REDE; Socialism and Liberty Party (PSOL); Sustainability Network (REDE); Brazilian Socialist Party (PSB); Agir	13	2min and 17sec	

=== Candidates failing to make runoff ===
Party	Candidate	Most relevant political office or occupation	Party	Running mate	Coalition	Electoral number	TV time per party/coalition	Refs.
Brazilian Social Democracy Party (PSDB)	Rodrigo Garcia	Governor of São Paulo (2022–2023)	Brazil Union (UNIÃO)	Geninho Zuliani	São Paulo Forward: Podemos (PODE); Avante; Always Forward; Brazilian Social Democracy Party (PSDB); Cidadania; Progressistas (PP); Brazil Union (UNIÃO); Brazilian Democratic Movement (MDB); Patriota; Solidariedade	45	4min and 13sec	
Democratic Labour Party (PDT)	Elvis Cezar	Mayor of Santana de Parnaíba (2013–2021)	Democratic Labour Party (PDT)	Gleides Sodré	—N/a	12	44sec	
New Party (NOVO)	Vinicius Poit	Federal Deputy from São Paulo (since 2019)	New Party (NOVO)	Doris Alves	—N/a (Note: At the New Party convention, it was decided that the party will not form coalitions in the state of São Paulo. The announcement was made at an exclusive event for members of the party.)	30	21sec	
United Socialist Workers' Party (PSTU)	Altino Prazeres Júnior	Chemical worker. Former president of the Chemical Industries' Workers Union of Pernambuco and the São Paulo Metro Workers Union	United Socialist Workers' Party (PSTU)	Flávia Bischain	—N/a	16	—N/a	
Brazilian Communist Party (PCB)	Gabriel Colombo	Bachelor of Agronomy and former leader of the Postgraduate National Association (ANPG)	Brazilian Communist Party (PCB)	Aline Miglioli	—N/a	21	—N/a	
Christian Democracy (DC)	Antonio Jorge	Lawyer	Christian Democracy (DC)	Vitor Rocca	—N/a	27	—N/a	
Workers' Cause Party (PCO)	Edson Dorta Silva	Secretary-general of the National Federation of Correios (in 2001 and 2012)	Workers' Cause Party (PCO)	Lílian Miranda	—N/a	29	—N/a	
Popular Unity (UP)	Carol Vigliar	Political activist and member of the Women's Movement Olga Benário.	Popular Unity (UP)	Eloiza Alves	—N/a	80	—N/a	
The television time reserved for political propaganda for each election will be distributed among all parties and coalitions that have a candidate and representation in the Chamber of Deputies.							Total: 10 minutes	

=== Withdrawn candidates ===
- Arthur do Val (UNIÃO) - State Deputy of São Paulo 2019–2022; candidate for Mayor of São Paulo in 2020. He was a potential candidate for governor affiliated to Podemos (PODE). He withdrew his candidacy on 5 March 2022 after the negative repercussion of his leaked audios with sexist statements about Ukrainian refugees.
- Guilherme Boulos (PSOL) - Born in São Paulo in 1982. Social activist, coordinator of the Homeless Workers' Movement, professor and writer. Candidate for President in 2018 and for Mayor of São Paulo in 2020. He withdrew his candidacy for governor on 21 March 2022 to become a candidate for federal deputy for São Paulo.
- Paulo Skaf (Republicanos) - President of CIESP (2007–2021) and President of FIESP (2004–2021). Skaf automatically left the race for the state government by joining the Republicans, whose candidate for the government is the former Minister of Infrastructure, Tarcísio Gomes de Freitas. Skaf was considered to be the running mate on Tarcísio's ticket or candidate for the Federal Senate instead of TV presenter and journalist José Luiz Datena (PSC).
- Mariana Conti (PSOL) - Councillor of Campinas (since 2020). Sociologist and doctoral student in political science at the State University of Campinas (Unicamp). She withdrew her candidacy on 24 June 2022, after failing to reach an agreement on a Socialism and Liberty Party candidacy for the Government of the State of São Paulo. This decision was taken because the party leadership has an interest into supporting the candidacy of Fernando Haddad from the Workers' Party (PT).
- Felício Ramuth (PSD) - Mayor of São José dos Campos 2017–2022; former Municipal Secretary of Transports and Communication Planning Advisor of São José dos Campos. The president of the Social Democratic Party, Gilberto Kassab sealed an agreement with the president of Republicanos, Marcos Pereira, for the party's support to the candidacy of Tarcísio Gomes de Freitas. Ramuth became the possible running mate of Tarcísio's ticket after this decision.
- Márcio França (PSB) - Governor of São Paulo 2018–2019; Vice Governor of São Paulo 2015–2018; State Secretary of Development of São Paulo 2015–2018; State Secretary of Sports, Leisure and Tourism of São Paulo 2011–2015; Federal Deputy from São Paulo 2007–2011; Mayor of São Vicente 1997–2005; City Councillor of São Vicente 1989–1997. On a video posted on his social media, França withdrew his candidacy after he made a promise where he said he would support the candidacy that held the best chances on the progressive camp based on opinion polls for the government of São Paulo. As Fernando Haddad has been leading the polls since Geraldo Alckmin decided to leave the dispute to be the running mate on Lula's presidential ticket, França said that he'll fulfill his promise by withdrawing his gubernatorial candidacy. Soon after, he declared support for Haddad's candidacy, and there has been some speculation of a senate run on the Brazil of Hope's coalition.
- Abraham Weintraub (PMB) - Minister of Education of Brazil 2019–2020 and World Bank Group Executive Director from the 15th district 2020–22. During the party's convention, Weintraub said that the conservative right don't have a "voice" and that's why he decided to become a candidate for federal deputy for São Paulo.
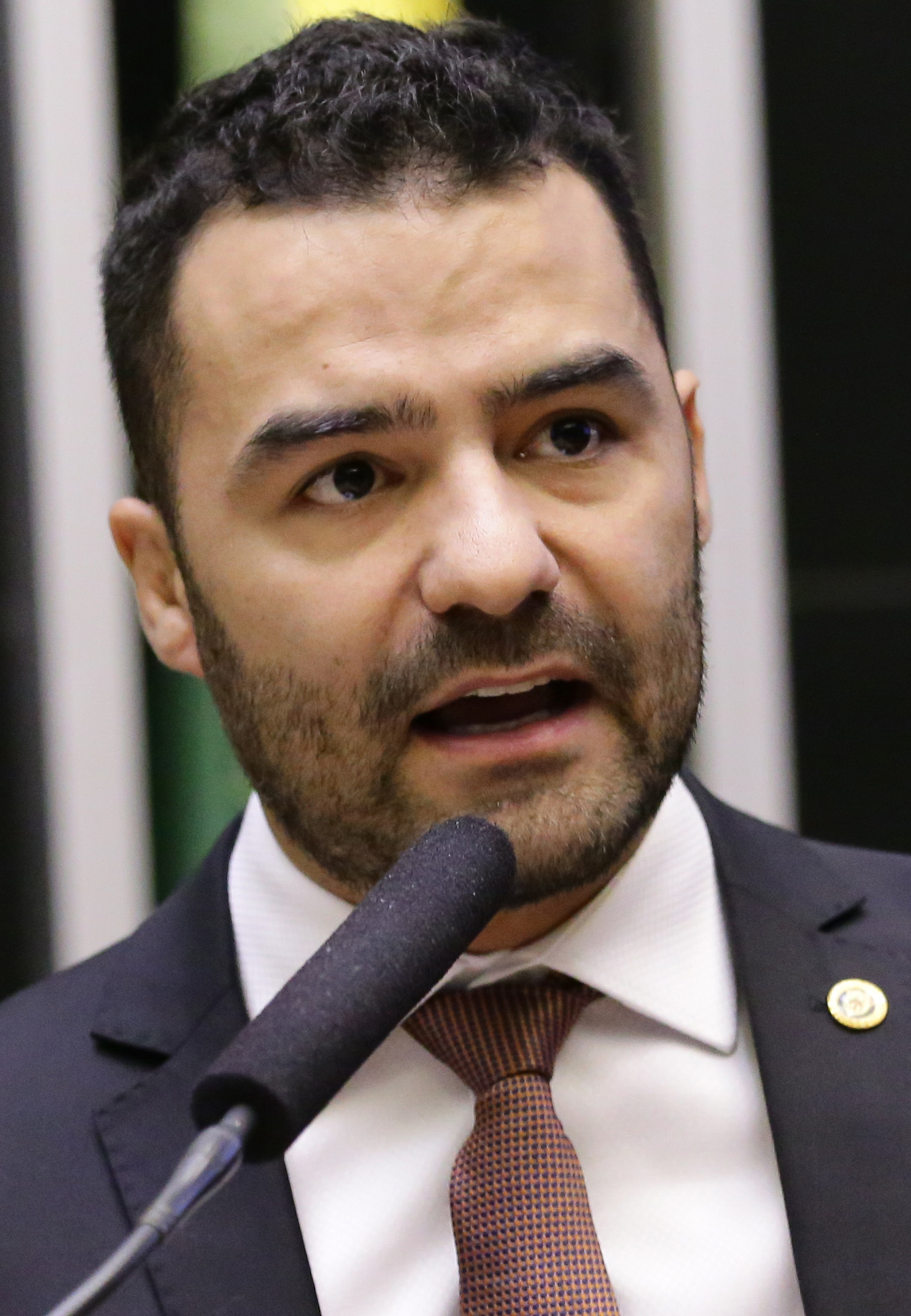
State Deputy of São Paulo
Arthur do Val (UNIÃO)
(2019–2022)

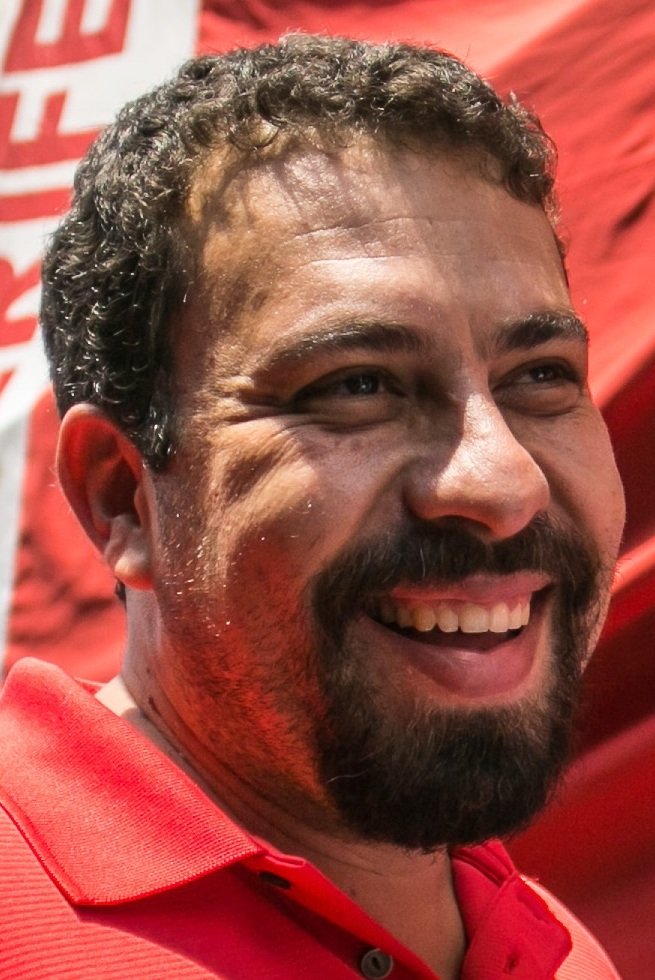
Social activist and coordinator of the MTST
Guilherme Boulos (PSOL)

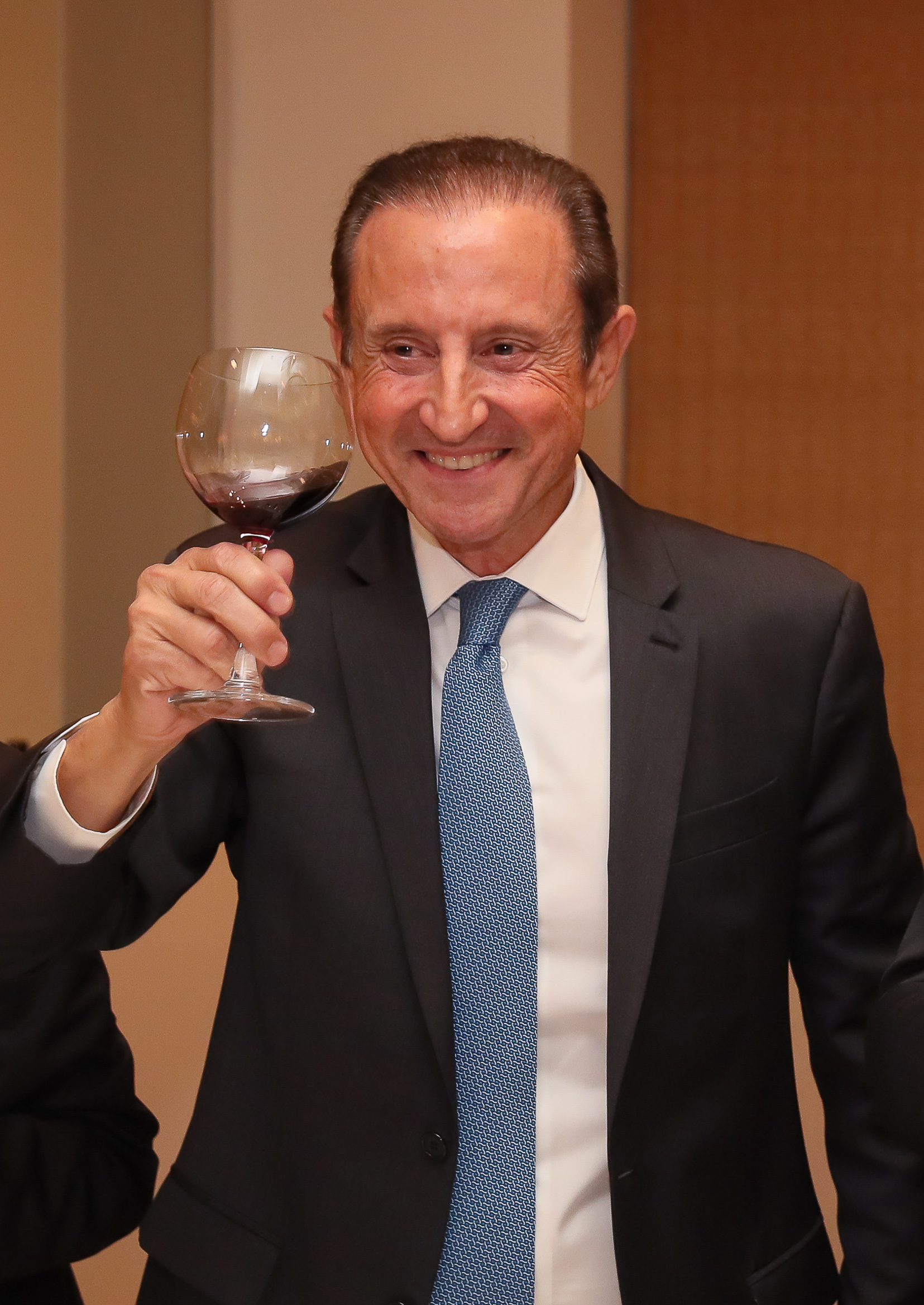
President of FIESP
Paulo Skaf (Republicanos)
(2004–2021)

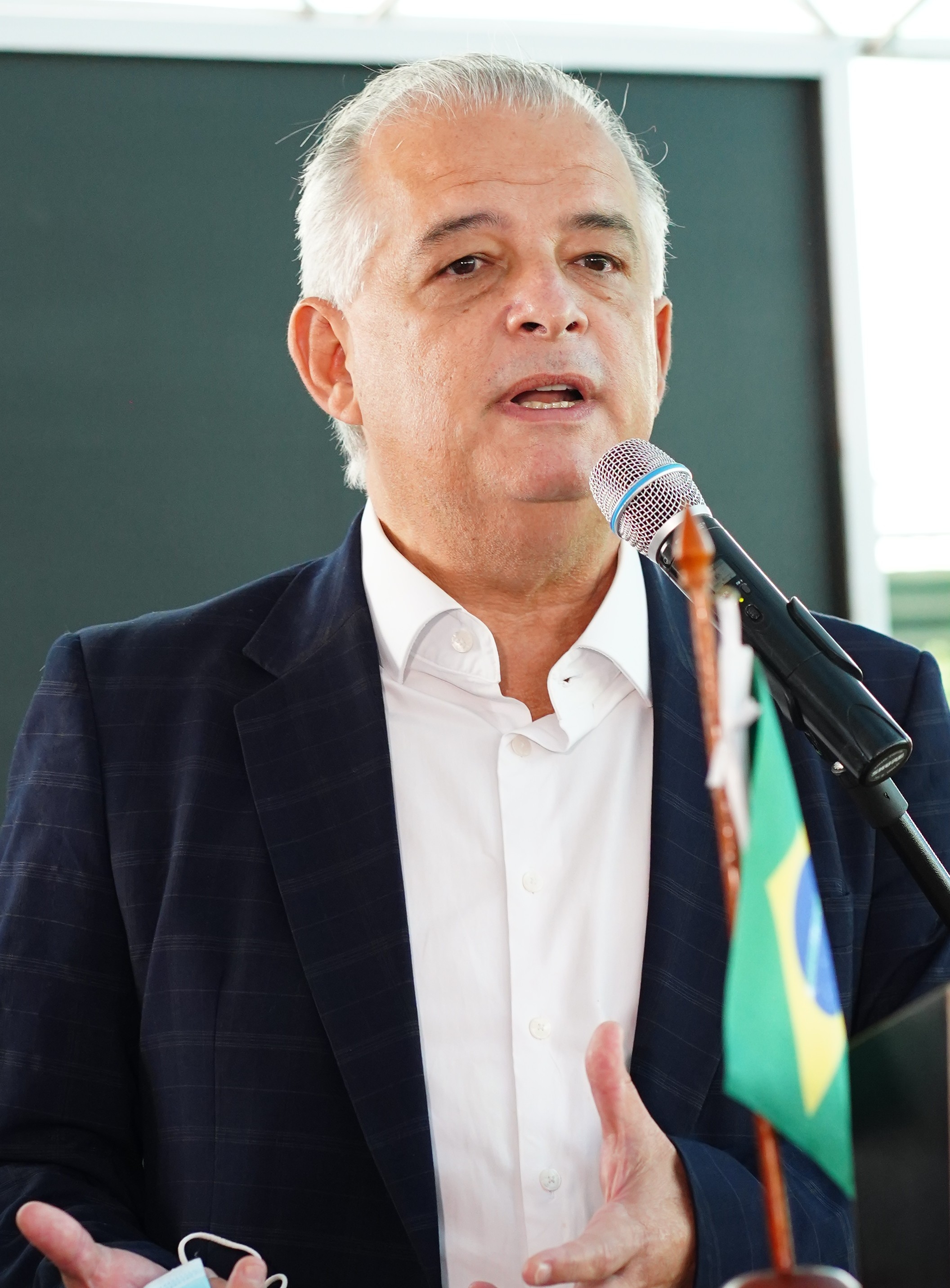
Governor of
São Paulo
Márcio França (PSB)
(2018–2019)

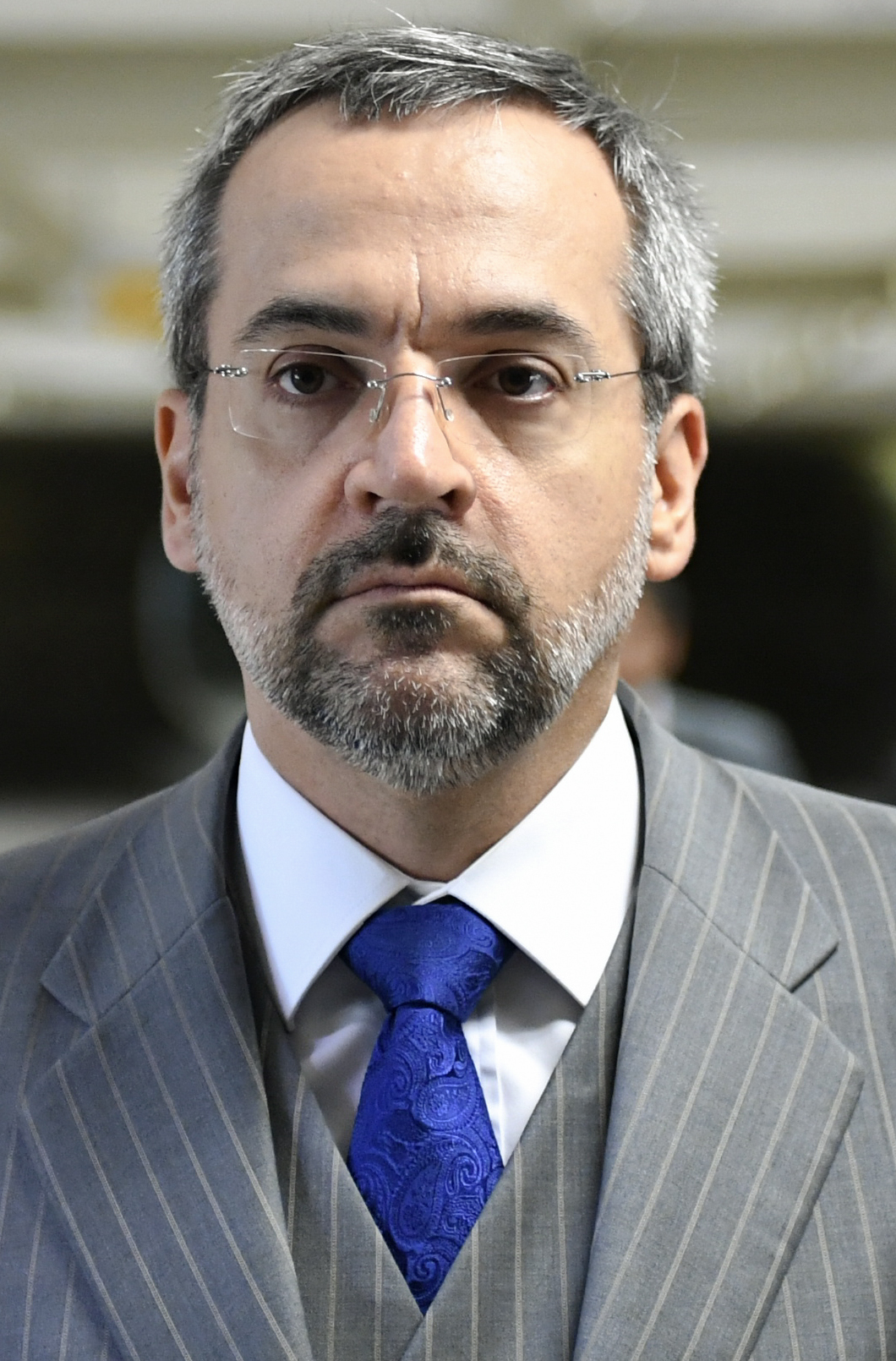
Minister of Education of Brazil
Abraham Weintraub (PMB)
(2019–2020)

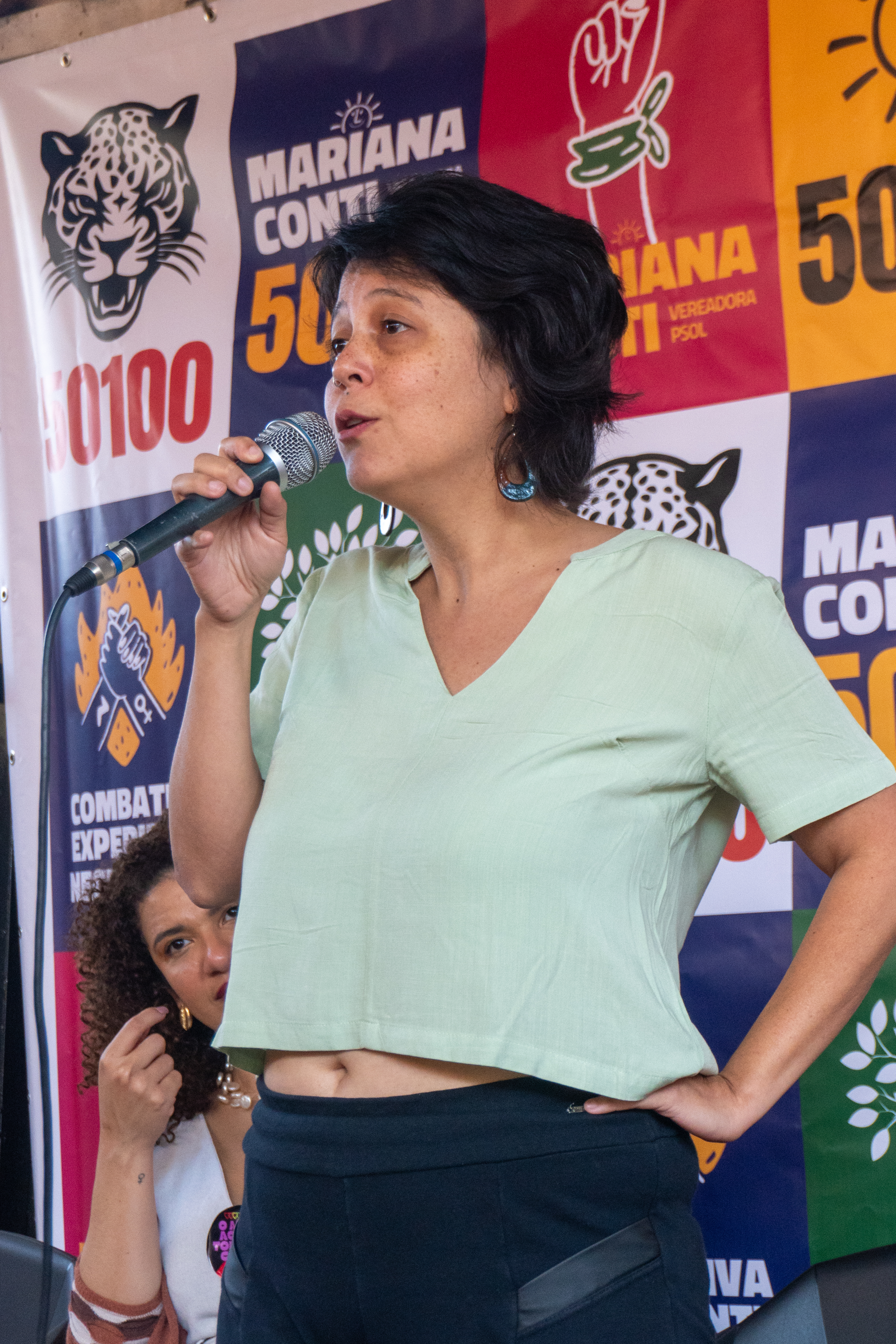
Councillor from Campinas
Mariana Conti (PSOL)
(2016–2020)

== Senatorial candidates ==
The party conventions began on 20 July and will continue until 5 August 2022. The following political parties have already confirmed their candidacies. Political parties have until 15 August 2022 to formally register their candidates.

=== Confirmed candidates ===
Party	Candidate	Most relevant political office or occupation	Party	Candidates for Alternate Senators	Coalition	Electoral number	Refs.
Democratic Labour Party (PDT)	Aldo Rebelo	Minister of Defence of Brazil (2015–2016)	Democratic Labour Party (PDT)	1st alternate senator: Maria Auxiliadora	—N/a	123	
Democratic Labour Party (PDT)	Aldo Rebelo	Minister of Defence of Brazil (2015–2016)	Democratic Labour Party (PDT)	2nd alternate senator: Antonio Carlos Fernandes Jr	—N/a	123	
Brazilian Democratic Movement (MDB)	Edson Aparecido	Secretary of Health of São Paulo (2018–2022)	Brazilian Democratic Movement (MDB)	1st alternate senator: Augusto Castro	São Paulo Forward: Podemos (PODE); Avante; Always Forward; Brazilian Social Democracy Party (PSDB); Cidadania; Progressistas (PP); Brazil Union (UNIÃO); Brazilian Democratic Movement (MDB); Patriota; Solidariedade	150	
Brazilian Democratic Movement (MDB)	Edson Aparecido	Secretary of Health of São Paulo (2018–2022)	Podemos (PODE)	2nd alternate senator: Elsa Oliveira	São Paulo Forward: Podemos (PODE); Avante; Always Forward; Brazilian Social Democracy Party (PSDB); Cidadania; Progressistas (PP); Brazil Union (UNIÃO); Brazilian Democratic Movement (MDB); Patriota; Solidariedade	150	
United Socialist Workers' Party (PSTU)	Luiz Carlos "Mancha" Prates	Former president of the Metalworkers Union of São José dos Campos and licensed director of CSP-Conlutas.	United Socialist Workers' Party (PSTU)	1st alternate senator: Eliana Ferreira	—N/a	161	
United Socialist Workers' Party (PSTU)	Luiz Carlos "Mancha" Prates	Former president of the Metalworkers Union of São José dos Campos and licensed director of CSP-Conlutas.	United Socialist Workers' Party (PSTU)	2nd alternate senator: Soraya de Matos	—N/a	161	
Brazilian Communist Party (PCB)	Tito Flávio Bellini	Professor at the Federal University of Triângulo Mineiro (UFTM), with a doctorate in history at the São Paulo State University (UNESP).	Brazilian Communist Party (PCB)	1st alternate senator: Ernesto Pichler	—N/a	211	
Brazilian Communist Party (PCB)	Tito Flávio Bellini	Professor at the Federal University of Triângulo Mineiro (UFTM), with a doctorate in history at the São Paulo State University (UNESP).	Brazilian Communist Party (PCB)	2nd alternate senator: Felipe Queiroz	—N/a	211	
Liberal Party (PL)	Marcos Pontes	Minister of Science, Technology and Innovation of Brazil (2019–2022)	Liberal Party (PL)	1st alternate senator: Alberto da Fonseca	São Paulo Can Do More: Social Christian Party (PSC); Brazilian Labour Party (PTB); Social Democratic Party (PSD); Liberal Party (PL)	222	
Liberal Party (PL)	Marcos Pontes	Minister of Science, Technology and Innovation of Brazil (2019–2022)	Liberal Party (PL)	2nd alternate senator: Sirlange Manga	São Paulo Can Do More: Social Christian Party (PSC); Brazilian Labour Party (PTB); Social Democratic Party (PSD); Liberal Party (PL)	222	
Christian Democracy (DC)	Marco Azkoul	Civil Police delegate	Christian Democracy (DC)	1st alternate senator: José Carlos Eymael	—N/a	270	
Christian Democracy (DC)	Marco Azkoul	Civil Police delegate	Christian Democracy (DC)	2nd alternate senator: Armando Barreto	—N/a	270	
Brazilian Labour Renewal Party (PRTB)	Janaina Paschoal	State Deputy of São Paulo (2019–2023)	Brazilian Labour Renewal Party (PRTB)	1st alternate senator: Nohara Paschoal	—N/a	287	
Brazilian Labour Renewal Party (PRTB)	Janaina Paschoal	State Deputy of São Paulo (2019–2023)	Brazilian Labour Renewal Party (PRTB)	2nd alternate senator: Jorge Coutinho Paschoal	—N/a	287	
Workers' Cause Party (PCO)	Antônio Carlos Silva	Math teacher, founder of the Workers' Party (PT) and the political current "Workers' Cause" (responsible for the foundation of the Workers' Cause Party (PCO), of which he is also a member of its national executive) and union leader.	Workers' Cause Party (PCO)	1st alternate senator: Nilson Ferreira	—N/a	290	
Workers' Cause Party (PCO)	Antônio Carlos Silva	Math teacher, founder of the Workers' Party (PT) and the political current "Workers' Cause" (responsible for the foundation of the Workers' Cause Party (PCO), of which he is also a member of its national executive) and union leader.	Workers' Cause Party (PCO)	2nd alternate senator: Adonize Meireles	—N/a	290	
New Party (NOVO)	Ricardo Mellão	State Deputy of São Paulo (since 2019)	New Party (NOVO)	1st alternate senator: Rodrigo Fonseca	—N/a (Note: At the New Party convention, it was decided that the party will not form coalitions in the state of São Paulo. The announcement was made at an exclusive event for members of the party.)	300	
New Party (NOVO)	Ricardo Mellão	State Deputy of São Paulo (since 2019)	New Party (NOVO)	2nd alternate senator: Isabel Teixeira	—N/a	300	
Brazilian Socialist Party (PSB)	Márcio França	Governor of São Paulo (2018–2019)	Socialism and Liberty Party (PSOL)	1st alternate senator: Juliano Medeiros	Together for São Paulo: Brazil of Hope; Workers' Party (PT); Communist Party of Brazil (PCdoB); Green Party (PV); Brazilian Socialist Party (PSB); PSOL-REDE; Socialism and Liberty Party (PSOL); Sustainability Network (REDE); Republican Party of the Social Order (PROS)	400	
Brazilian Socialist Party (PSB)	Márcio França	Governor of São Paulo (2018–2019)	Brazilian Socialist Party (PSB)	2nd alternate senator: Doralice Fehr	Together for São Paulo: Brazil of Hope; Workers' Party (PT); Communist Party of Brazil (PCdoB); Green Party (PV); Brazilian Socialist Party (PSB); PSOL-REDE; Socialism and Liberty Party (PSOL); Sustainability Network (REDE); Republican Party of the Social Order (PROS)	400	
Popular Unity (UP)	Vivian Mendes	President of Popular Unity in the state of São Paulo, bachelor in Social Communication from UNESP and member of the Commission for Relatives of Political Dead and Disappeared.	Popular Unity (UP)	1st alternate senator: Márcia Damásio	—N/a	800	
Popular Unity (UP)	Vivian Mendes	President of Popular Unity in the state of São Paulo, bachelor in Social Communication from UNESP and member of the Commission for Relatives of Political Dead and Disappeared.	Popular Unity (UP)	2nd alternate senator: Selma Maria de Almeida	—N/a	800	

=== Rejected candidacies ===
- Sergio Moro (UNIÃO) - Federal judge of the Federal Regional Court of the 4th Region (TRF-4) 1996–2018 and Minister of Justice and Public Security in the Jair Bolsonaro's cabinet (2019–2020). He was a potential candidate for the Federal Senate in the state of São Paulo, but the Regional Electoral Court of São Paulo (TRE-SP) rejected the transfer of voting domicile, on the grounds that the former judge didn't have a professional relationship with the State. He can appeal to the Superior Electoral Court (TSE), but decided to run for the Senate representing the state of Paraná.
- Paulo Skaf (Republicanos) - President of CIESP (2007–2021) and President of FIESP (2004–2021). He was one of the possible names for the Senate race in the state of São Paulo. However, the Republicans convention decided to support Marcos Pontes' candidacy.
- Nise Yamaguchi (PROS) - Oncologist and immunologist, university professor. Her party officially endorsed Fernando Haddad and Márcio França, joining the Together for São Paulo coalition. Yamaguchi filed a lawsuit in the electoral justice for an independent candidacy, awaiting decision.
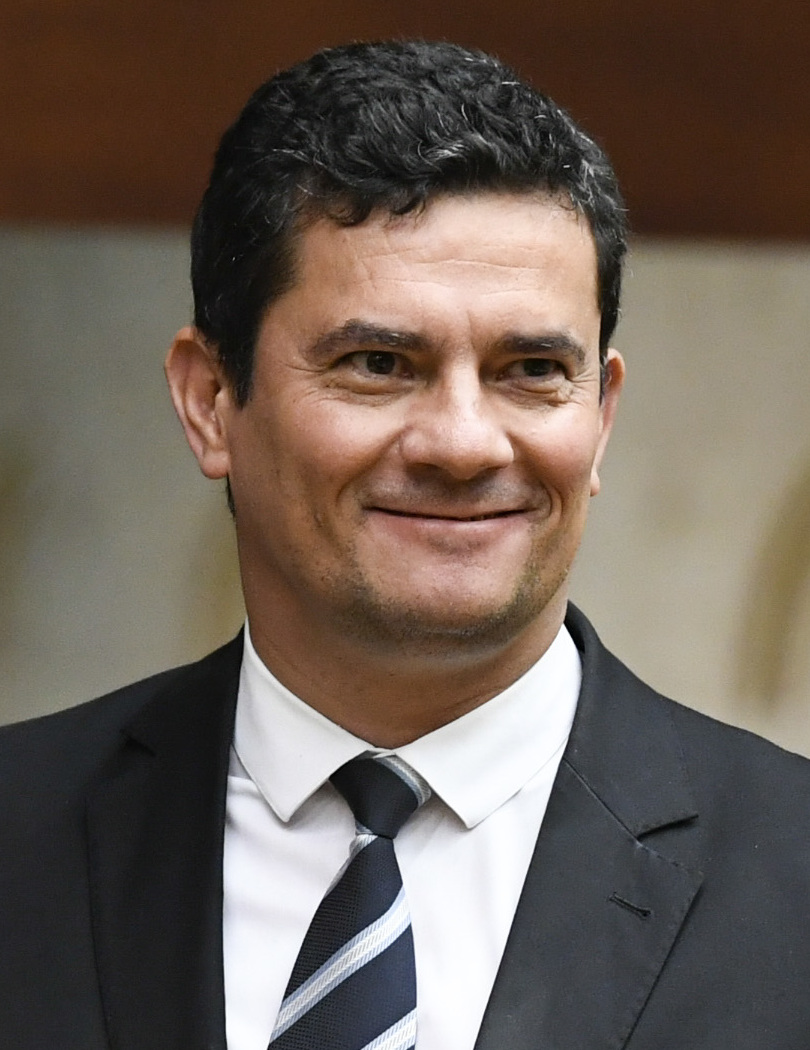
Minister of Justice and Public Security
Sergio Moro (UNIÃO)

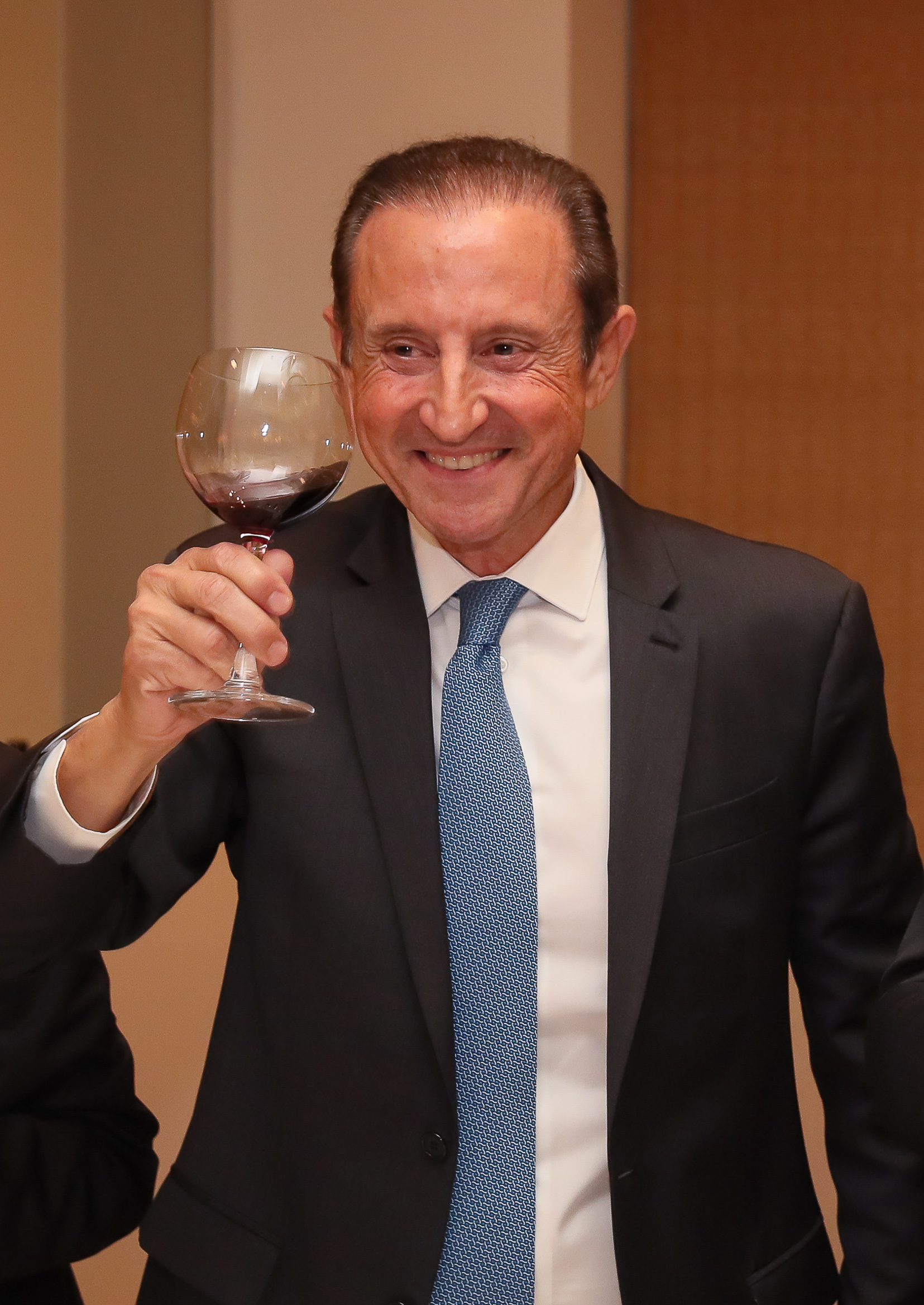
President of FIESP
Paulo Skaf (Republicanos)
(2004–2021)

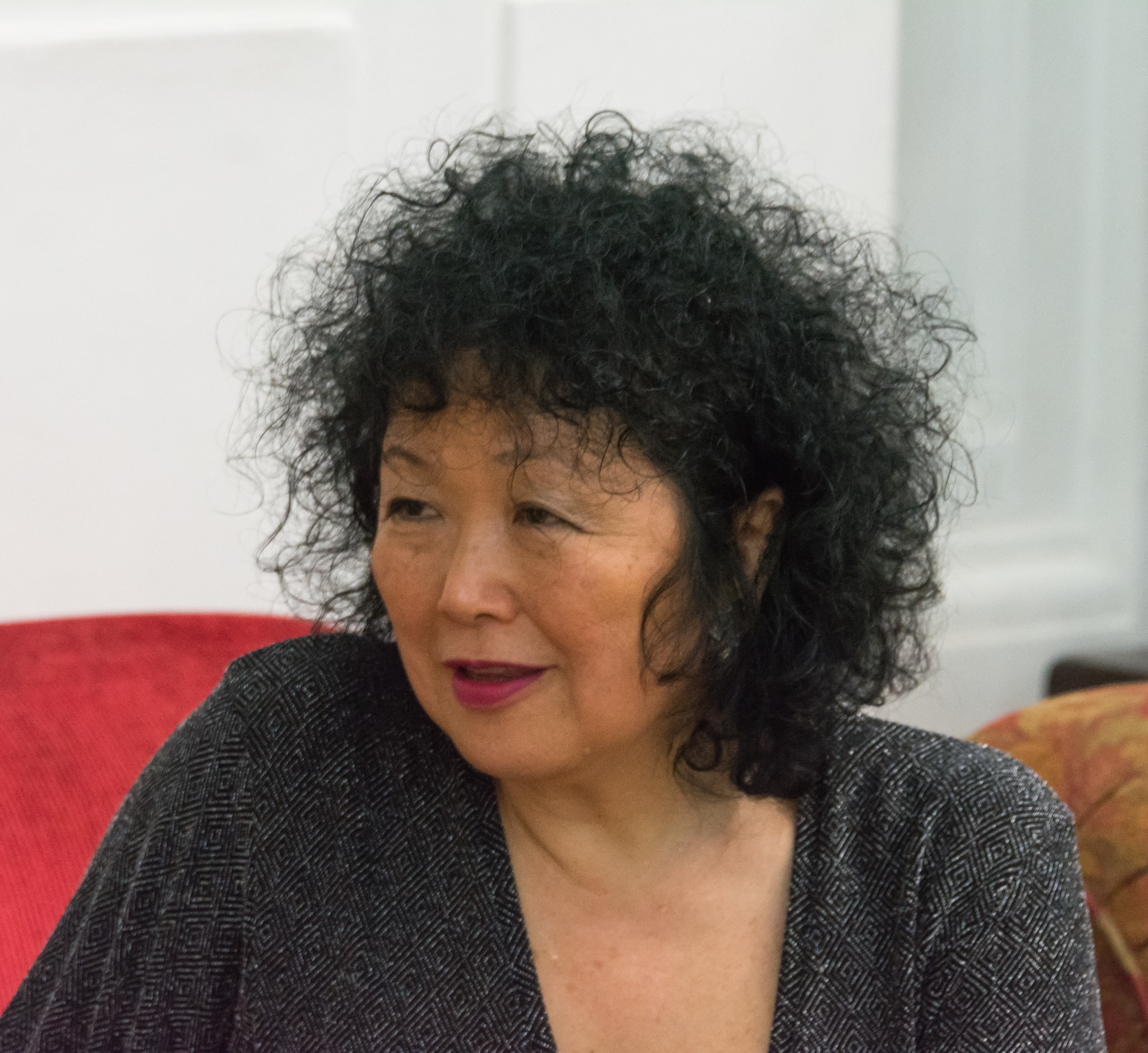
Oncologist and immunologist
Nise Yamaguchi (PROS)

=== Withdrawn candidacies ===
- José Luiz Datena (PSC) - TV presenter and journalist. He announced the withdrawal of his candidacy for the Federal Senate and said that his decision was influenced by attacks from radical groups.
- Arthur Weintraub (PMB) - Special advisor to the Presidency of the Republic (2019–20) and Secretary of Multidimensional Security at the Organization of American States (OAS) 2020–2022. He withdrew his candidacy for the Senate and decided to be a candidate for Federal Deputy.
- Cristiane Brasil (PTB) - Federal Deputy from Rio de Janeiro (2015–19). She withdrew her candidacy for the Senate, decided to be a candidate for Federal Deputy and endorsed former minister Marcos Pontes (PL).
- Heni Ozi Cukier (PODE) - State Deputy of São Paulo (2019–2023). With the formalization of the national alliance between Podemos, Brazilian Democratic Movement and the Brazilian Social Democracy Party, Cukier ended up losing space on Rodrigo Garcia's ticket, who preferred to accommodate other names of allied parties. With this scenario, the deputy ended up giving up his candidacy to run for the Chamber of Deputies.
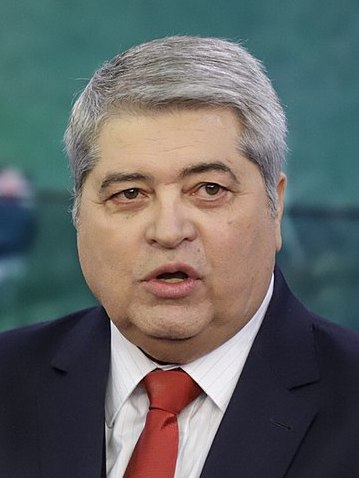
TV presenter and journalist
Datena (PSC)

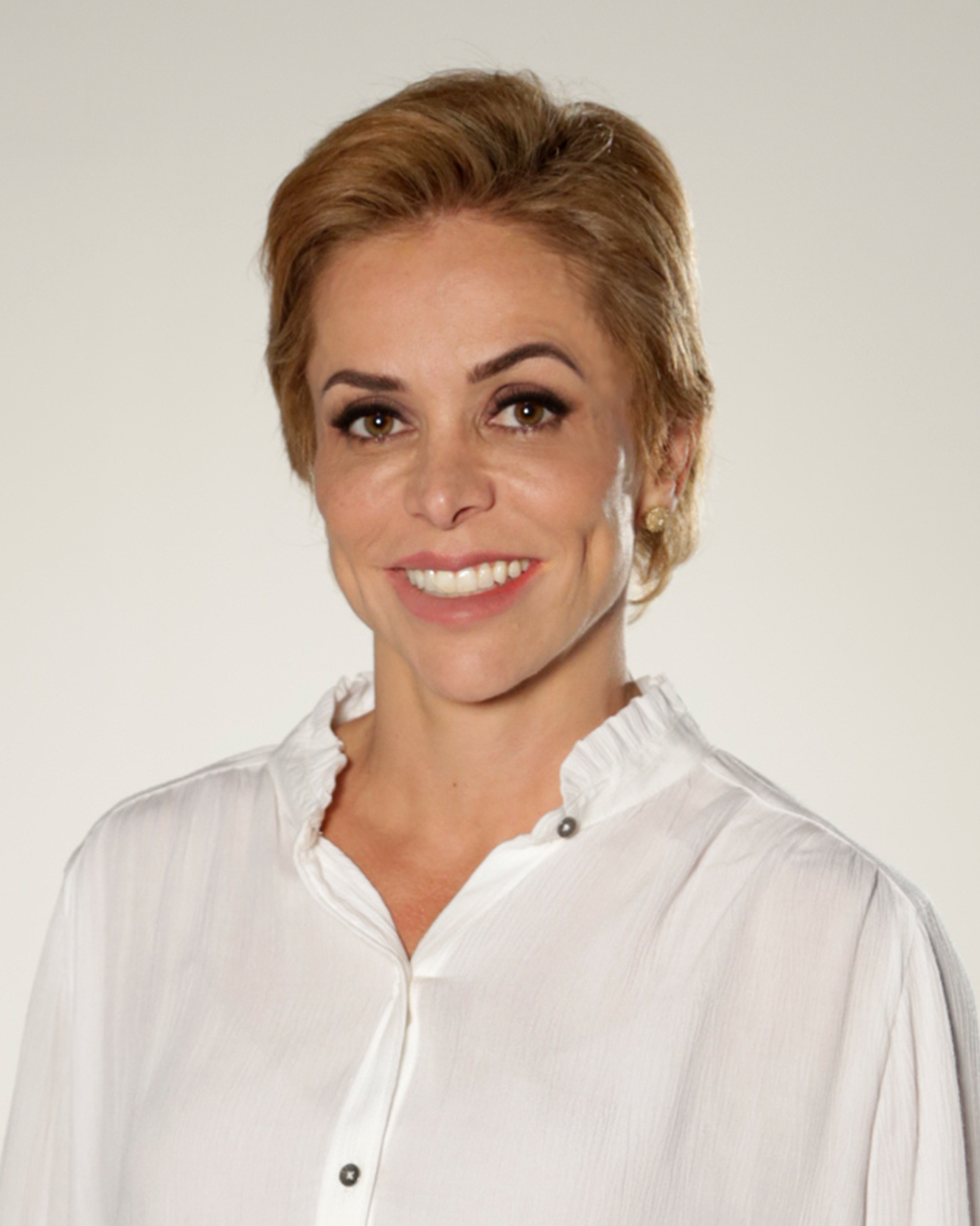
Federal Deputy from Rio de Janeiro
Cristiane Brasil (PTB)
(2015–2019)

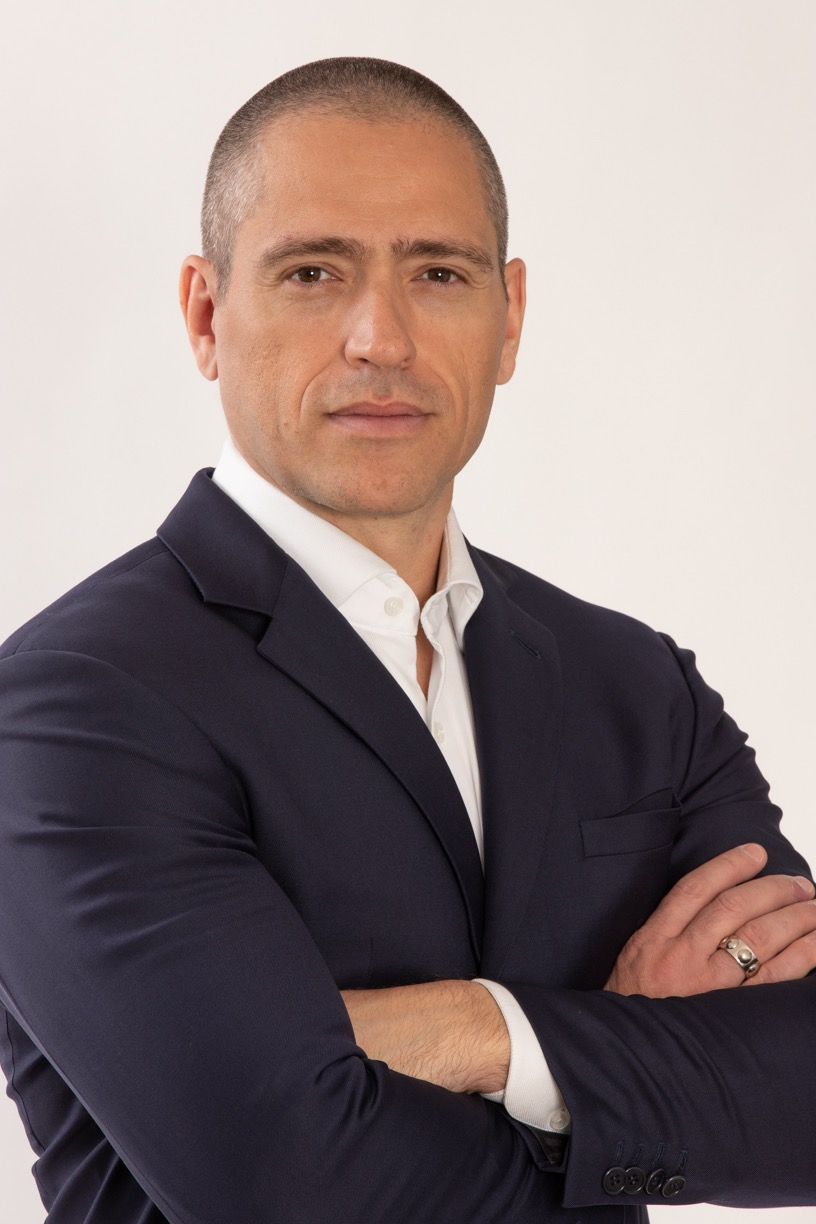
State Deputy of São Paulo
Heni Ozi Cukier (PODE)
(2019–2023)

== Debate list ==
For the first time in the Brazilian general elections since 1989, television and radio stations, newspapers and news websites group themselves into pools to hold gubernatorial debates, by request of the campaigns in order to reduce the number of debates scheduled for the 2022 elections.

As of 29 August 2022, the following presidential debates were held or scheduled (times in UTC−03:00):

2022 São Paulo gubernatorial election debates
No.	Date, time and location	Hosts	Moderators	Participants				
Key: P Present A Absent I Invited N Not invited				PT	Rep	PSDB	NOVO	PDT
Key: P Present A Absent I Invited N Not invited				Haddad	Freitas	Garcia	Poit	Cezar
1.1	Sunday, 7 August 2022, 22:00, São Paulo	Band TV, BandNews TV, BandNews FM, Rádio Bandeirantes	Rodolfo Schneider	P	P	P	P	P
1.2	Tuesday, 13 September 2022, 22:00, São Paulo	TV Cultura, Cultura FM, Rádio Brasil Atual	Leão Serva, Fabíola Cidral	P	P	P	P	P
1.3	Saturday, 17 September 2022, 18:30, Osasco	SBT, O Estado de S. Paulo, Veja, Terra, NovaBrasil FM	Carlos Nascimento	P	P	P	P	P
1.4	Tuesday, 27 September 2022, 22:30, São Paulo	Rede Globo, G1	César Tralli	P	P	P	P	P
2.1	Monday, 10 October 2022, 22:00, São Paulo	Rede Bandeirantes, BandNews TV, BandNews FM, Rádio Bandeirantes	Rodolfo Schneider	P	P	Out		
2.2	Friday, 14 October 2022, 18:30, São Paulo	SBT, O Estado de S. Paulo, Veja, NovaBrasil FM	Carlos Nascimento	P	A	Out		
2.3	Monday, 17 October 2022, 22:00, São Paulo	TV Cultura, Cultura FM, UOL, Folha de S. Paulo	Vera Magalhães	P	A	Out		
2.4	Thursday, 27 October 2022, 22:30, São Paulo	Rede Globo, G1	César Tralli	P	P	Out		

2022 São Paulo vice gubernatorial election debates
No.	Date, time and location	Hosts	Moderators	Participants				
Key: P Present A Absent				PSB	PSD	UNIÃO	NOVO	PDT
Key: P Present A Absent				França	Ramuth	Zuliani	Alves	Sodré
1	Monday, 19 September 2022, 15:10, Campinas	EPTV, G1, Rádio CBN	Arthur Menicucci	A	P	P	P	A

2022 São Paulo senatorial election debates
No.	Date, time and location	Hosts	Moderators	Participants					
Key: P Present A Absent				PSB	PL	PRTB	PDT	MDB	NOVO
Key: P Present A Absent				França	Pontes	Paschoal	Rebelo	Aparecido	Mellão
1	Sunday, 25 September 2022, 23:15, Campinas	EPTV, G1	Eduardo Brambilla	A	A	P	P	P	P

== Opinion polls ==
=== First round ===
The first round is scheduled to take place on 2 October 2022.

2022

Pollster/client(s)	Date(s) conducted	Sample size	Haddad PT	Tarcísio Republicanos	Garcia PSDB	Elvis PDT	Poit NOVO	Colombo PCB	Prazeres PSTU	Carol UP	Others	Abst. Undec.	Lead
Datafolha	27–29 Sep 2022	2.000	35%	26%	18%	1%	1%	1%	0%	1%	0%	16%	9%
Atlas	23–27 Sep 2022	2.200	33%	28,6%	22,5%	0,6%	1,9%	0,3%	0,1%	0,4%	0,9% (Note: Edson Dorta (PCO) with 0,9%)	11,8%	4,4%
Genial/Quaest	22–25 Sep 2022	2.000	31%	21%	20%	1%	1%	1%	0%	1%	1% (Note: Antobio Jorge (DC) with 1%)	23%	10%
Datafolha	20–22 Sep 2022	2.000	34%	23%	19%	1%	0%	1%	0%	1%	1% (Note: Edson Dorta (PCO) with 1%)	20%	9%
Ipec	17–19 Sep 2022	2.000	34%	22%	18%	1%	1%	1%	1%	1%	1% (Note: Antonio Jorge (DC) with 1%)	20%	8%
Datafolha	13–15 Sep 2022	1.808	36%	22%	19%	1%	1%	1%	1%	1%	1% (Note: Antonio Jorge (DC) with 1%)	18%	14%
Badra	12–14 Sep 2022	2.666	33,3%	26,7%	21,4%	0,7%	1,3%	1,2%	0,4%	1,2%	1,6% (Note: Antonio Jorge (DC) with 0.9% and Edson Dorta (PCO) with 0.7%)	12,2%	6,6%
Ipespe	5–7 Sep 2022	1.000	36%	21%	16%	0%	1%	1%	1%	1%	0%	24%	15%
Genial/Quaest	2–5 Sep 2022	2.000	33%	20%	15%	0%	1%	1%	0%	2%	1% (Note: Antonio Jorge (DC) with 1% and Edson Dorta (PCO) with 0%)	27%	13%
Ipec/Globo	3–5 Sep 2022	1.504	36%	21%	14%	1%	1%	1%	1%	1%	2% (Note: Antonio Jorge (DC) with 1% and Edson Dorta (PCO) with 1%.)	22%	15%
Datafolha	30 Aug–1 Sep 2022	1.808	35%	21%	15%	1%	1%	1%	1%	2%	2% (Note: Antônio Jorge (DC) with 1% and Edson Dorta Silva (PCO) with 1%)	22%	14%
Globo/Ipec	27–29 Aug 2022	1.504	32%	17%	10%	1%	1%	1%	1%	2%	1% (Note: Antônio Jorge (DC) with 1% and Edson Dorta Silva (PCO) did not score on this opinion poll.)	35%	15%
Badra Comunicação	25–27 Aug 2022	2.666	36%	24%	16,2%	0,9%	1,6%	2,4%	1,4%	1,8%	2,7% (Note: Antônio Jorge (DC) with 1,4% and Edson Dorta Silva (PCO) with 1,3%.)	13%	12%
Atlas	20–24 Aug 2022	1.600	28,4%	24,1%	14,4%	0,4%	1,5%	0,7%	0,1%	3%	0,6% (Note: Antônio Jorge (DC) with 0,4% and Edson Dorta Silva (PCO) with 0,2%.)	26,6%	4,3%
Paraná Pesquisas	18–22 Aug 2022	1.880	32,4%	23,4%	15,6%	0,5%	0,9%	0,3%	0,3%	0,6%	0,3% (Note: Antônio Jorge (DC) with 0,2% and Edson Dorta Silva (PCO) with 0,1%.)	25,7%	9%
RealTime Big Data	19–20 Aug 2022	2.000	34%	20%	20%	1%	2%	0%	0%	0%	0% (Note: Edson Dorta Silva (PCO) and Antonio Jorge (DC) both scored 0% in this opinion poll.)	23%	14%
Datafolha	16–18 Aug 2022	1.812	38%	16%	11%	1%	1%	2%	1%	2%	1% (Note: Edson Dorta Silva (PCO) with 1%)	28%	22%
Globo/Ipec	12–14 Aug 2022	1.200	29%	12%	9%	2%	2%	2%	2%	0%	1% (Note: Edson Dorta Silva (PCO) with 1%)	39%	17%
Modal Mais/Futura	8–10 Aug 2022	1.000	28,7%	21,2%	9,8%	0,8%	1,6%	1,6%	0,5%	0,8%	0,6% (Note: Edson Dorta Silva (PCO) with 0,6%)	34,6%	7,5%
Modal Mais/Futura	8–10 Aug 2022	1.000	32,9%	25,9%	17,6%	–	–	–	–	–	–	23,6%	7%
Genial/Quaest	5–8 Aug 2022	2.000	34%	14%	14%	2%	1%	1%	1%	0%	1% (Note: Edson Dorta Silva (PCO) with 1%)	32%	20%
RealTime Big Data	1–2 Aug 2022	2.000	33%	20%	19%	1%	2%	0%	0%	0%	0% (Note: Abraham Weintraub's name was mentioned in the opinion poll, but he didn't score.)	24%	13%
RealTime Big Data	1–2 Aug 2022	2.000	34%	22%	20%	–	–	–	–	–	–	24%	12%
31 July 2022	Abraham Weintraub withdrawns his candidacy to run for federal deputy.												
Pollster/client(s)	Date(s) conducted	Sample size	Haddad PT	Tarcísio Republicanos	Garcia PSDB	Elvis PDT	Poit NOVO	Weintraub PMB	Colombo PCB	Prazeres PSTU	Others	Abst. Undec.	Lead
Paraná Pesquisas	25–28 Jul 2022	1.880	33,2%	22,5%	14%	0,5%	1,2%	0,3%	0,9%	0,3%	–	17%	10,7%
Badra Comunicação	21–23 Jul 2022	2.666	41,3%	17,9%	13,1%	2,5%	1,9%	0,9%	1,9%	1%	–	19,5%	23,4%
Real Time Big Data	8–9 Jul 2022	1.500	34%	20%	16%	1%	2%	1%	0%	0%	(Note: Felício Ramuth (PSD) with 0% - The candidate withdrew his candidacy before the release of this opinion poll.)	26%	14%
Real Time Big Data	8–9 Jul 2022	1.500	35%	21%	18%	–	–	–	–	–	–	26%	14%
Jul 2022	Former Governor Márcio França withdrawns his candidacy to run for Senator. Ramuth withdrawns his candidacy to run as running mate of Tarcísio Gomes de Freitas.												
Pollster/client(s)	Date(s) conducted	Sample size	Haddad PT	Tarcísio Republicanos	França PSB	Garcia PSDB	Elvis PDT	Ramuth PSD	Poit NOVO	Weintraub PMB	Others	Abst. Undec.	Lead
Genial/Quaest	1–4 Jul 2022	1.640	29%	12%	18%	8%	1%	1%	1%	1%	1% (Note: Gabriel Colombo (PCB) with 1% and Altino Prazeres (PSTU) with 0%)	28%	11%
Genial/Quaest	1–4 Jul 2022	1.640	35%	14%	–	12%	–	2%	2%	–	–	36%	21%
Genial/Quaest	1–4 Jul 2022	1.640	38%	15%	–	14%	–	–	–	–	–	33%	23%
Genial/Quaest	1–4 Jul 2022	1.640	39%	28%	–	17%	–	–	–	–	(Note: Possible electoral scenario in which the presidential candidate Lula (PT) and vice-presidential candidate Geraldo Alckmin (PSB) supports Fernando Haddad (PT) for the government of São Paulo. In this scenario, Jair Bolsonaro (PL) supports Tarcísio Freitas (Republicanos) and Rodrigo Garcia (PSDB) would not be supported by anyone.)	16%	11%
Datafolha	28–30 Jun 2022	1.806	28%	12%	16%	10%	1%	2%	1%	1%	3% (Note: Gabriel Colombo (PCB) with 2% and Altino Prazeres (PSTU) with 1%)	25%	12%
Datafolha	28–30 Jun 2022	1.806	34%	13%	–	13%	1%	2%	1%	1%	5% (Note: Gabriel Colombo (PCB) with 3% and Altino Prazeres (PSTU) with 2%)	29%	21%
Paraná Pesquisas	27–30 Jun 2022	1.820	30,6%	19,2%	17%	9,2%	0,1%	0,7%	1,5%	0,4%	0,7% (Note: Gabriel Colombo (PCB) with 0,5% and Altino Prazeres (PSTU) with 0,2%)	20,5%	11,4%
Paraná Pesquisas	27–30 Jun 2022	1.820	31,2%	19,8%	18,3%	9,6%	–	–	–	–	–	21,1%	11,4%
Paraná Pesquisas	27–30 Jun 2022	1.820	36,5%	22,9%	–	12,6%	–	–	–	–	–	28%	13,6%
Paraná Pesquisas	27–30 Jun 2022	1.820	36,2%	31,2%	–	11,8%	–	–	–	–	(Note: Possible electoral scenario in which the presidential candidate, Lula (PT) would support Fernando Haddad (PT) for the government of São Paulo, Jair Bolsonaro (PL) would support Tarcísio Freitas (Republicanos) and Simone Tebet (MDB) would support Rodrigo Garcia (PSDB).)	20,8%	5%
Exame/Ideia	3–8 Jun 2022	1.200	27%	17%	14%	11%	–	1%	1%	0,4%	0,4% (Note: Gabriel Colombo (PCB) with 0,3% and Altino Prazeres (PSTU) with 0,1%)	28%	10%
Exame/Ideia	3–8 Jun 2022	1.200	31%	17%	–	14%	–	1%	2%	0,4%	0,5% (Note: Gabriel Colombo (PCB) with 0,3% and Altino Prazeres (PSTU) with 0,2%)	33%	14%
Paraná Pesquisas	22–26 May 2022	1.880	28,6%	17,9%	17,7%	7,3%	0,4%	1,2%	0,5%	0,3%	1,2% (Note: Gabriel Colombo (PCB) with 1,1% and Altino Prazeres (PSTU) with 0,1%)	25%	10,7%
Paraná Pesquisas	22–26 May 2022	1.880	29%	18,2%	18,7%	7,5%	–	–	–	–	–	26,5%	10,3%
Paraná Pesquisas	22–26 May 2022	1.880	34,5%	21,7%	–	10,5%	–	–	–	–	–	33,3%	12,8%
Real Time Big Data	20–21 May 2022	1.500	29%	15%	15%	7%	1%	1%	1%	1%	–	30%	14%
Real Time Big Data	20–21 May 2022	1.500	–	15%	27%	9%	2%	1%	2%	1%	–	43%	12%
Real Time Big Data	20–21 May 2022	1.500	33%	20%	–	10%	1%	2%	2%	1%	–	31%	13%
Real Time Big Data	20–21 May 2022	1.500	30%	16%	16%	7%	–	–	–	–	–	31%	14%
Quaest/Genial	6–9 May 2022	1.640	30%	10%	17%	5%	1%	1%	1%	1%	2% (Note: Gabriel Colombo (PCB) with 1% and Altino Prazeres (PSTU) with 1%)	33%	13%
Quaest/Genial	6–9 May 2022	1.640	37%	12%	–	8%	–	2%	2%	–	–	39%	25%
Quaest/Genial	6–9 May 2022	1.640	–	12%	29%	9%	–	2%	3%	–	–	45%	17%
Quaest/Genial	6–9 May 2022	1.640	39%	14%	–	9%	–	–	–	–	–	38%	25%
Instituto Gerp	25–29 Apr 2022	1.600	26%	13%	15%	4%	–	3%	1%	–	1% (Note: Gabriel Colombo (PCB) with 1% and Altino Prazeres (PSTU) with 1%)	35%	11%
Paraná Pesquisas	24–29 Apr 2022	1.820	29,7%	15,2%	18,6%	5,6%	0,4%	1%	1,9%	0,7%	0,2% (Note: Altino Prazeres (PSTU) with 0,2%)	26,8%	11,1%
Paraná Pesquisas	24–29 Apr 2022	1.820	30,3%	15,7%	19,2%	6,5%	–	–	–	–	–	28,4%	11,1%
Paraná Pesquisas	24–29 Apr 2022	1.820	34,2%	19,5%	–	8,6%	–	–	–	–	–	37,7%	14,7%
Paraná Pesquisas	24–29 Apr 2022	1.820	31,6%	30,1%	–	9,2%	–	–	–	–	(Note: Possible electoral scenario in which the presidential candidate Lula (PT) supports Fernando Haddad (PT) for the government of São Paulo, Bolsonaro (PL) supports Tarcísio Freitas (Republicanos) and João Doria (PSDB) supports Rodrigo Garcia (PSDB))	29,1%	1,5%
Govnet/Opinião Pesquisa	20–25 Apr 2022	800	26,04%	9,66%	13,2%	3,06%	0,86%	1,59%	1,1%	0,49%	2,32% (Note: Renata Abreu (PODE) with 2,32%)	41,69%	12,84%
Govnet/Opinião Pesquisa	20–25 Apr 2022	800	35,45%	10,39%	–	3,67%	0,98%	1,71%	1,71%	0,98%	2,44% (Note: Renata Abreu (PODE) with 2,44%)	42,67%	25,06%
Govnet/Opinião Pesquisa	20–25 Apr 2022	800	–	10,27%	25,67%	3,55%	1,1%	1,59%	1,59%	0,49%	2,69% (Note: Renata Abreu (PODE) with 2,69%)	53,06%	15,4%
Ipespe	6–9 Apr 2022	1.000	29%	10%	20%	6%	1%	2%	2%	1%	1% (Note: Altino Prazeres (PSTU) with 1%)	29%	9%
Ipespe	6–9 Apr 2022	1.000	30%	14%	20%	6%	–	–	–	–	–	32%	10%
Ipespe	6–9 Apr 2022	1.000	35%	18%	–	9%	–	–	–	–	–	38%	17%
Ipespe	6–9 Apr 2022	1.000	39%	29%	–	11%	–	–	–	–	(Note: Possible electoral scenario in which the presidential candidate Lula (PT) and vice-presidential candidate Geraldo Alckmin (PSB) supports Fernando Haddad (PT) for the government of São Paulo, Bolsonaro (PL) supports Tarcísio Freitas (Republicanos) and João Doria (PSDB) supports Rodrigo Garcia (PSDB).)	21%	10%
Datafolha	5–6 Apr 2022	1.806	29%	10%	20%	6%	–	2%	2%	1%	1% (Note: Altino Prazeres (PSTU) with 1%)	30%	9%
Datafolha	5–6 Apr 2022	1.806	35%	11%	–	11%	–	3%	2%	1%	2% (Note: Altino Junior (PSTU) with 2%)	33%	24%
Mar 2022	The state deputy of São Paulo, Arthur do Val (Mamãe Falei) withdrew his candidacy to São Paulo's government on early March 2022 after private audios of him saying that "Ukrainian women are easier because they are poor" became viral in Brazil. Boulos withdrew his candidature on March 21, 2022, in order to run for a seat at the Chamber of Deputies of Brazil.												
Pollster/client(s)	Date(s) conducted	Sample size	Haddad PT	Tarcísio Ind.	França PSB	Garcia PSDB	Boulos PSOL	Abreu PODE	Poit NOVO	Weintraub Ind.	Others	Abst. Undec.	Lead
Paraná Pesquisas	27–31 Mar 2022	1.820	30,2%	12,6%	17,1%	3,5%	–	4,2%	0,9%	0,5%	0,8% (Note: Felicio Ramuth (PSD) with 0,8%)	30,1%	13,1%
Paraná Pesquisas	27–31 Mar 2022	1.820	31,1%	12,7%	17,6%	3,8%	–	–	1,4%	–	1% (Note: Felicio Ramuth (PSD) with 1%)	32,3%	13,5%
Paraná Pesquisas	27–31 Mar 2022	1.820	31,4%	12,9%	18,4%	4%	–	–	–	–	–	33,3%	13%
Real Time Big Data	25–27 Mar 2022	1.500	27%	14%	14%	6%	–	2%	1%	1%	1% (Note: Felicio Ramuth (PSD) with 1%)	34%	13%
Real Time Big Data	25–27 Mar 2022	1.500	27%	15%	15%	7%	–	–	1%	–	–	35%	12%
Real Time Big Data	25–27 Mar 2022	1.500	32%	20%	–	9%	–	–	2%	–	–	37%	12%
Real Time Big Data	25–27 Mar 2022	1.500	–	17%	29%	9%	–	–	2%	–	–	43%	12%
Quaest/Genial	11–14 Mar 2022	1.640	24%	9%	18%	3%	7%	3%	2%	1%	1% (Note: Felicio Ramuth (PSD) with 1%)	33%	6%
Quaest/Genial	11–14 Mar 2022	1.640	30%	11%	–	5%	–	7%	3%	–	3% (Note: Felicio Ramuth (PSD) with 3%)	42%	19%
Quaest/Genial	11–14 Mar 2022	1.640	31%	12%	–	6%	–	–	4%	–	3% (Note: Felicio Ramuth (PSD) with 3%)	44%	19%
Quaest/Genial	11–14 Mar 2022	1.640	35%	15%	–	8%	–	–	–	–	–	42%	20%
15 Feb 2022	Lula confirms Geraldo Alckmin as his running mate in 2022 Brazilian general election.												
Pollster/client(s)	Date(s) conducted	Sample size	Haddad PT	Alckmin Ind.	França PSB	Garcia PSDB	Boulos PSOL	Tarcísio Ind.	Poit NOVO	Weintraub Ind.	Others	Abst. Undec.	Lead
Ipespe	14–16 Feb 2022	1.000	20%	20%	12%	3%	10%	7%	1%	2%	–	25%	Tie
Ipespe	14–16 Feb 2022	1.000	28%	–	18%	5%	11%	10%	–	–	–	28%	10%
Ipespe	14–16 Feb 2022	1.000	–	–	31%	6%	–	15%	–	–	–	48%	16%
Ipespe	14–16 Feb 2022	1.000	33%	–	–	7%	–	16%	–	–	–	45%	17%
Ipespe	14–16 Feb 2022	1.000	38%	–	–	10%	–	25%	–	–	–	27%	13%
Ipespe	14–16 Feb 2022	1.000	6%	2%	4%	1%	3%	5%	0%	0%	4% (Note: João Doria (PSDB) with 4%)	77%	2%

2021

15 Dec 2021	Geraldo Alckmin decides to leave the Brazilian Social Democracy Party (PSDB) after being affiliated by 33 years on the political party.												
Pollster/client(s)	Date(s) conducted	Sample size	Haddad PT	França PSB	Alckmin PSDB	Boulos PSOL	Tarcísio Ind.	Val PATRI	Garcia PSDB	Weintraub Ind.	Others	Abst. Undec.	Lead
Paraná Pesquisas	13–17 Dec 2021	1.818	16%	–	30,2%	12,5%	6,3%	4,6%	5,4%	–	0,8% (Note: Vinicius Poit (NOVO) with 0,8%)	24,3%	14,2%
Paraná Pesquisas	13–17 Dec 2021	1.818	–	24,3%	–	18,6%	6,7%	5,2%	7,9%	–	1% (Note: Vinicius Poit (NOVO) with 1%)	36,3%	5,7%
Datafolha	13–16 Dec 2021	2.034	19%	13%	28%	10%	5%	2%	–	1%	1% (Note: Vinicius Poit (NOVO) with 1%)	20%	9%
Datafolha	13–16 Dec 2021	2.034	28%	19%	–	11%	7%	3%	6%	1%	1% (Note: Vinicius Poit (NOVO) with 1%)	25%	9%
Datafolha	13–16 Dec 2021	2.034	–	28%	–	18%	9%	4%	8%	2%	1% (Note: Vinicius Poit (NOVO) with 1%)	30%	10%
Ipespe/Valor	29 Nov–1 Dec 2021	1.000	19%	–	23%	11%	8%	–	3%	–	–	36%	4%
Ipespe/Valor	29 Nov–1 Dec 2021	1.000	–	19%	–	23%	10%	–	5%	–	–	43%	4%
Ipespe/Valor	29 Nov–1 Dec 2021	1.000	27%	–	–	13%	13%	–	6%	–	–	41%	14%
26 Nov 2021	Tarcísio Gomes de Freitas, the Minister of Infrastructure of Jair Bolsonaro, decides to run for the Government of São Paulo.												
Pollster/client(s)	Date(s) conducted	Sample size	Haddad PT	França PSB	Alckmin PSDB	Boulos PSOL	Val PATRI	Garcia PSDB	Weintraub Ind.	Skaf MDB	Others	Abst. Undec.	Lead
Datafolha	13–15 Sep 2021	2.034	17%	15%	26%	11%	4%	–	4%	–	5% (Note: Tarcísio Freitas (Ind.) with 4% and Vinicius Poit (NOVO) with 1%)	20%	9%
Datafolha	13–15 Sep 2021	2.034	23%	19%	–	13%	5%	5%	2%	–	7% (Note: Tarcísio Freitas (Ind.) with 6% and Vinicius Poit (NOVO) with 1%)	26%	4%
EXAME/IDEIA	23–26 Aug 2021	2.000	16%	15%	19%	14%	4%	5%	–	7%	4% (Note: Tarcísio Freitas (Ind.) with 2% and Vinicius Poit (NOVO) with 2%)	16%	3%
Paraná Pesquisas	7–10 Jun 2021	1.818	8,5%	11%	17,6%	12,3%	5,2%	0,4%	–	8,1%	19,8% (Note: José Luiz Datena (PSL) with 19,1% and Vinicius Poit (NOVO) with 0,7%)	17%	2,2%
Paraná Pesquisas	7–10 Jun 2021	1.818	–	12%	19,6%	15,2%	5,3%	–	–	8,5%	20,9% (Note: José Luiz Datena (PSL) with 20,2% and Vinicius Poit (NOVO) with 0,7%)	18,4%	1,3%
Paraná Pesquisas	7–10 Jun 2021	1.818	–	14,3%	–	16,2%	5,6%	1,8%	–	10,7%	26,2% (Note: José Luiz Datena (PSL) with 25,4% and Vinicius Poit (NOVO) with 0,8%)	25,2%	10%
Paraná Pesquisas	7–10 Jun 2021	1.818	–	13,3%	23,7%	16,6%	8,1%	1,3%	–	9,2%	5% (Note: Janaína Paschoal (PSL) with 4,3% and Vinicius Poit (NOVO) with 0,7%)	24,8%	7,1%
Paraná Pesquisas	7–10 Jun 2021	1.818	–	15,6%	–	17%	6,2%	–	–	10,3%	23% (Note: João Doria (PSDB) with 13,5%; Janaina Paschoal (PSL) with 5%; Tarcísio Gomes de Freitas (Ind.) with 3,7% and Vinicius Poit (NOVO) with 0,8%)	28,1%	6%
14 May 2021	Rodrigo Garcia leaves Democrats (DEM) and decides to join Brazilian Social Democracy Party (PSDB).												
Pollster/client(s)	Date(s) conducted	Sample size	Haddad PT	França PSB	Alckmin PSDB	Boulos PSOL	Val PATRI	Garcia DEM	Weintraub Ind.	Skaf MDB	Others	Abst. Undec.	Lead
Atlas/El País	7–11 May 2021	1.050	14,6%	12,5%	–	17%	6,9%	2,5%	–	16,4%	–	30,1%	0,6%
Atlas/El País	7–11 May 2021	1.050	–	11,5%	–	26,3%	7,5%	–	–	17,9%	13,3% (Note: João Doria (PSDB) with 13,3%)	23,5%	8,4%
Atlas/El País	7–11 May 2021	1.050	25,3%	10,4%	–	–	6,6%	–	14,9%	13,5%	12,2% (Note: João Doria (PSDB) with 12,2%)	17,1%	10,4%
Ipespe/Valor	5–7 Apr 2021	1.000	20%	18%	17%	–	5%	1%	4%	–	–	36%	2%
Ipespe/Valor	5–7 Apr 2021	1.000	–	17%	17%	16%	5%	–	–	–	8% (Note: João Doria (PSDB) with 8%)	36%	Tie
Govnet/Opinião Pesquisa	17–23 Mar 2021	812	21,06%	13,92%	10,59%	–	–	3,82%	1,48%	5,67%	10,71% (Note: João Doria (PSDB) with 9,85% and Elvis Cezar (PSDB) with 0,86%)	32,76%	7,14%
Govnet/Opinião Pesquisa	17–23 Mar 2021	812	23,89%	16,38%	–	–	–	4,56%	2,71%	7,88%	13,3% (Note: João Doria (PSDB) with 11,95% and Elvis Cezar (PSDB) with 1,35%)	31,28%	7,51%
Govnet/Opinião Pesquisa	17–23 Mar 2021	812	23,52%	15,15%	14,9%	–	4,56%	–	2,59%	7,02%	1,23% (Note: Elvis Cezar (PSDB) with 1,23%)	31,03%	8,37%

=== Second round ===
The second round (if necessary) is scheduled to take place on 30 October 2022.

Pollster/client(s)	Date(s) conducted	Sample size	Tarcísio Republicanos	Haddad PT	Abst. Undec.	Lead
2022 election	30 Oct	–	55.27%	44.73%	21.07%	10.54%
Ipec	26–29 Oct	2,000	46%	42%	12%	3%
Datafolha	17–19 Oct	1,806	46%	42%	12%	4%
Atlas	26–29 Oct	2,500	51.2%	46,3%	2,6%	4.9%
Badra Comunicação	23–27 Oct	1,810	48%	44%	7%	4%
Paraná Pesquisas	23–27 Oct	1,810	52.2%	36.9%	10.9%	15.3%
Brasmarket	22–25 Oct	800	53.5%	32,4%	20,1%	21,1%
Brasmarket	17–19 Oct	800	55.0%	34,6%	10,4%	20,4%
Ipec	23–25 Oct	2,000	46%	43%	11%	3%
RealTime Big Data	24–25 Oct	1,200	50%	39%	11%	11%
Atlas	21–25 Oct	2,500	51.7%	44,7%	3,6%	7%
Brasmarket	17–19 Oct	800	55.0%	34,6%	10,4%	20,4%
RealTime Big Data	17–18 Oct	1,200	49%	36%	15%	13%
Datafolha	17–19 Oct	1,806	49%	40%	11%	9%
Paraná Pesquisas	16–20 Oct	1,810	51.0%	37.3%	11.4%	13,3%
Modalmais/Futura	10–12 Oct	1,200	54.2%	38.4%	7.4%	15.8%
Paraná Pesquisas	9–13 Oct	1,810	49.9%	39.2%	10.7%	10,7%
RealTime Big Data	10–11 Oct	1,200	48%	36%	16%	12%
Atlas	9–13 Oct	2,500	53.2%	42,4%	4,5%	10,8%
Ipec	9–11 Oct	2,000	46%	41%	13%	5%
Datafolha	5–7 Oct	1,806	50%	40%	10%	10%
Paraná Pesquisas	4–6 Oct	1,810	50.4%	38.4%	11.2%	12%

2022

Haddad vs. Tarcísio de Freitas

Pollster/client(s)	Date(s) conducted	Sample size	Haddad PT	Tarcísio Republicanos	Abst. Undec.	Lead
Datafolha	27–29 Sep 2022	2.000	48%	40%	12%	8%
Atlas	23–27 Sep 2022	2.200	40,1%	40,7%	19,1%	0,6%
Genial/Quaest	22–25 Sep 2022	2.000	42%	39%	19%	3%
Datafolha	20–22 Sep 2022	2.000	49%	38%	12%	11%
Ipec	17–19 Sep 2022	2.000	44%	34%	21%	10%
Datafolha	13–15 Sep 2022	1.808	54%	36%	10%	18%
Ipespe	5–7 Sep 2022	1.000	48%	35%	17%	13%
Genial/Quaest	2–5 Sep 2022	2.000	42%	36%	22%	6%
Ipec/Globo	3–5 Sep 2022	1.504	43%	32%	25%	11%
Datafolha	30 Aug–1 Sep	1.808	51%	36%	12%	15%
Globo/Ipec	27–29 Aug	1.504	47%	31%	22%	16%
RealTime Big Data	19–20 Aug	2.000	39%	30%	31%	9%
Datafolha	16–18 Aug	1.812	53%	31%	16%	22%
Modal Mais/Futura	8–10 Aug	1.000	40%	40,2%	19,7%	0,2%
Genial/Quaest	5–8 Aug	2.000	44%	31%	26%	13%
Real Time Big Data	1–2 Aug	2.000	39%	29%	32%	10%
Paraná Pesquisas	25–28 Jul	1.880	40,4%	34,5%	25%	5,9%
Real Time Big Data	8–9 Jul	1.500	38%	29%	33%	9%
Genial/Quaest	1–4 Jul	1.640	44%	28%	29%	16%
EXAME/IDEIA	3–8 Jun	1.200	36%	31%	33%	5%
Real Time Big Data	20–21 May	1.500	35%	27%	38%	8%
Quaest/Genial	6–9 May	1.640	45%	23%	32%	22%
Ipespe	6–9 Apr	1.000	40%	27%	33%	13%
28 March 2022	Tarcísio de Freitas joins Republicans in order to run in the 2022 São Paulo gubernatorial election.					
Pollster/client(s)	Date(s) conducted	Sample size	Haddad PT	Tarcísio Ind.	Abst. Undec.	Lead
Quaest/Genial	11–14 Mar	1.640	42%	27%	28%	15%

Haddad vs. Garcia

Pollster/client(s)	Date(s) conducted	Sample size	Haddad PT	Garcia PSDB	Abst. Undec.	Lead
Datafolha	27–29 Sep 2022	2.000	45%	40%	12%	5%
Atlas	23–27 Sep 2022	2.200	34,6%	41%	24,4%	6,4%
Genial/Quaest	22–25 Sep 2022	2.000	36%	45%	19%	9%
Datafolha	20–22 Sep 2022	2.000	46%	41%	14%	5%
Ipec	17–19 Sep 2022	2.000	41%	33%	25%	8%
Datafolha	13–15 Sep 2022	1.808	47%	41%	13%	6%
Ipespe	5–7 Sep 2022	1.000	46%	37%	18%	9%
Genial/Quaest	2–5 Sep 2022	2.000	40%	35%	25%	5%
Ipec/Globo	3–5 Sep 2022	1.504	42%	31%	28%	11%
Datafolha	30 Aug–1 Sep	1.808	48%	38%	14%	10%
Globo/Ipec	27–29 Aug	1.504	45%	29%	26%	16%
RealTime Big Data	19–20 Aug	2.000	37%	32%	33%	5%
Datafolha	16–18 Aug	1.812	51%	32%	17%	19%
Modal Mais/Futura	8–10 Aug	1.000	36,6%	37,3%	26,2%	0,7%
Genial/Quaest	5–8 Aug	2.000	41%	32%	28%	9%
Real Time Big Data	1–2 Aug	2.000	37%	29%	34%	8%
Paraná Pesquisas	25–28 Jul	1.880	38,2%	26,8%	35,1%	11,4%
Real Time Big Data	8–9 Jul	1.500	38%	24%	38%	14%
Genial/Quaest	1–4 Jul	1.640	42%	27%	30%	15%
EXAME/IDEIA	3–8 Jun	1.200	38%	29%	34%	9%
Real Time Big Data	20–21 May	1.500	36%	21%	43%	15%
Quaest/Genial	6–9 May	1.640	44%	21%	35%	23%
Ipespe	6–9 Apr	1.000	39%	23%	38%	16%
Quaest/Genial	11–14 Mar	1.640	41%	25%	34%	16%

Tarcísio de Freitas vs. Garcia

Pollster/client(s)	Date(s) conducted	Sample size	Tarcísio Republicanos	Garcia PSDB	Abst. Undec.	Lead
Atlas	23–27 Sep 2022	2.200	34,5%	36%	29,5%	1,5%
Genial/Quaest	22–25 Sep 2022	2.000	31%	40%	29%	9%
Ipec	17–19 Sep 2022	2.000	32%	33%	36%	1%
Ipespe	5–7 Sep 2022	1.000	31%	32%	37%	1%
Genial/Quaest	2–5 Sep 2022	2.000	30%	32%	38%	2%
Ipec/Globo	3–5 Sep 2022	1.504	31%	32%	38%	1%
Globo/Ipec	27–29 Aug	1.504	31%	28%	41%	3%
RealTime Big Data	19–20 Aug	2.000	30%	31%	39%	1%
Modal Mais/Futura	8–10 Aug	1.000	35,1%	30,3%	34,6%	4,8%
Genial/Quaest	5–8 Aug	2.000	26%	29%	45%	3%
Real Time Big Data	1–2 Aug	2.000	29%	30%	41%	1%
Paraná Pesquisas	25–28 Jul	1.880	33,2%	27,2%	39,5%	6%
Real Time Big Data	8–9 Jul	1.500	28%	24%	48%	4%
Genial/Quaest	1–4 Jul	1.640	25%	28%	47%	3%
EXAME/IDEIA	3–8 Jun	1.200	32%	30%	39%	2%
Real Time Big Data	20–21 May	1.500	26%	18%	56%	8%
Quaest/Genial	6–9 May	1.640	23%	23%	54%	Tie
28 March 2022	Tarcísio de Freitas joins Republicans in order to run in the 2022 São Paulo gubernatorial election.					
Pollster/client(s)	Date(s) conducted	Sample size	Tarcísio Ind.	Garcia PSDB	Abst. Undec.	Lead
Quaest/Genial	11–14 Mar	1.640	29%	18%	53%	11%

=== Hypothetical scenarios with Márcio França ===
França x Haddad

Pollster/client(s)	Date(s) conducted	Sample size	Haddad PT	França PSB	Abst. Undec.	Lead
Genial/Quaest	1–4 Jul	1.640	38%	36%	26%	2%
EXAME/IDEIA	3–8 Jun	1.200	34%	34%	32%	Tie
Real Time Big Data	20–21 May	1.500	33%	33%	34%	Tie
Quaest/Genial	6–9 May	1.640	38%	32%	29%	6%
Quaest/Genial	11–14 Mar	1.640	38%	33%	28%	5%

França x Tarcísio

Pollster/client(s)	Date(s) conducted	Sample size	França PSB	Tarcísio Republicanos	Abst. Undec.	Lead
Genial/Quaest	1–4 Jul	1.640	44%	24%	32%	20%
EXAME/IDEIA	3–8 Jun	1.200	37%	33%	30%	4%
Real Time Big Data	20–21 May	1.500	37%	24%	39%	13%
Quaest/Genial	6–9 May	1.640	42%	20%	39%	22%
Ipespe	6–9 Apr	1.000	39%	25%	36%	14%

França x Garcia

Pollster/client(s)	Date(s) conducted	Sample size	França PSB	Garcia PSDB	Abst. Undec.	Lead
Genial/Quaest	1–4 Jul	1.640	43%	22%	35%	21%
EXAME/IDEIA	3–8 Jun	1.200	38%	33%	29%	5%
Real Time Big Data	20–21 May	1.500	42%	17%	41%	25%
Quaest/Genial	6–9 May	1.640	41%	18%	41%	23%
Ipespe	6–9 Apr	1.000	42%	20%	38%	22%
Quaest/Genial	11–14 Mar	1.640	44%	15%	41%	29%

=== Senator ===
2022

Pollster/client(s)	Date(s) conducted	Sample size	França PSB	Pontes PL	Paschoal PRTB	Aldo PDT	Mellão NOVO	Edson MDB	Tito PCB	Vivian UP	Others	Abst. Undec.	Lead
Datafolha	27–29 Sep 2022	2.000	34%	21%	4%	3%	1%	3%	1%	2%	2% (Note: Antonio Carlos (PCO) with 2%)	28%	13%
Ipec	24–26 Sep 2022	2,000	30%	19%	5%	4%	2%	4%	2%	2%	2% (Note: Antonio Carlos (PCO) with 1% and Mancha (PSTU) with 1%)	31%	11%
Genial/Quaest	22–25 Sep 2022	2.000	26%	25%	5%	2%	1%	2%	1%	1%	1% (Note: Antonio Carlos (PCO) with 1%)	35%	1%
Datafolha	20–22 Sep 2022	2.000	31%	19%	5%	3%	1%	3%	1%	3%	3% (Note: Antônio Carlos (PCO) with 2% and Dr. Azkoul (DC) with 1%)	31%	12%
Badra	12–14 Sep 2022	2.666	34,5%	23,4%	6,5%	3,2%	1,8%	2,0%	1,7%	2,9%	4,0% (Note: Antonio Carlos (PCO) with 2,9%, Dr. Azkoul (DC) with 0.8% and Mancha (PSTU) with 0,3%)	20%	11,1%
Ipespe	5–7 Sep 2022	1.000	28%	15%	8%	3%	1%	3%	1%	1%	1% (Note: Mancha (PSTU) with 1%)	39%	13%
Paraná Pesquisas	4–8 Sep 2022	1.880	31,2%	16,4%	9,8%	2,8%	1,2%	2,3%	0,5%	0,6%	2,0% (Note: Antônio Carlos (PCO) with 1%, Mancha (PSTU) with 0,6% and Dr. Azkoul (DC) with 0,4%)	33,3%	14,8%
Ipec/Globo	3–5 Sep 2022	1.504	31%	13%	5%	4%	3%	3%	2%	2%	4% (Note: Antônio Carlos (PCO) with 2%, Mancha (PSTU) with 1% and Dr. Azkoul (DC) with 1%)	34%	18%
Genial/Quaest	2–5 Sep 2022	2.000	25%	23%	7%	2%	1%	2%	1%	1%	1% (Note: Antonio Carlos (PCO) with 1% and Dr. Azkoul with 0%)	36%	2%
Datafolha	30 Aug−1 Sep 2022	1.808	30%	13%	7%	4%	1%	3%	2%	2%	5% (Note: Antônio Carlos Silva (PCO) with 3%; Dr. Askoul (DC) with 1% and Luiz Carlos "Mancha" Prates (PSTU) with 1%)	32%	17%
Globo/Ipec	27–29 Aug 2022	1.504	25%	12%	6%	3%	1%	2%	2%	2%	5% (Note: Antônio Carlos Silva (PCO) with 3%; Dr. Askoul (DC) with 1% and Luiz Carlos "Mancha" Prates (PSTU) with 1%)	43%	13%
Badra Comunicação	25–27 Aug 2022	2.666	30,3%	19,9%	9%	5,4%	2,8%	2,7%	2,4%	2,8%	5,1% (Note: Antônio Carlos Silva (PCO) with 3,7%; Dr. Askoul (DC) with 1% and Luiz Carlos "Mancha" Prates (PSTU) with 0,4%)	19,5%	10,4%
Atlas	20–24 Aug 2022	1.600	22,4%	17%	9,5%	2,4%	0,7%	0,7%	0,5%	2,6%	0,7% (Note: Antônio Carlos Silva (PCO) with 0,4%; Luiz Carlos "Mancha" Prates (PSTU) with 0,2% and Dr. Askoul (DC) with 0,1%)	43,4%	5,4%
Paraná Pesquisas	18–22 Aug 2022	1.880	29,7%	12,3%	10%	2%	0,5%	1,7%	0,3%	0,8%	0,9% (Note: Antônio Carlos Silva (PCO) with 0,6%; Dr. Askoul (DC) with 0,2% and Luiz Carlos "Mancha" Prates (PSTU) with 0,1%)	42,8%	17,4%
RealTime Big Data	19–20 Aug 2022	2.000	28%	13%	15%	2%	2%	1%	0%	0%	0% (Note: Dr. Askoul (DC); Luiz Carlos "Mancha" Prates (PSTU) and Antônio Carlos Silva (PCO) with 0%)	39%	14%
Globo/Ipec	12–14 Aug 2022	1.200	20%	5%	5%	3%	1%	2%	1%	2%	20% (Note: Paulo Skaf (Republicanos) with 12%; Milton Leite (UNIÃO) with 4%; Antônio Carlos Silva (PCO) with 2%; José Aníbal (PSDB) with 2% and Luiz Carlos "Mancha" Prates (PSTU) with 0%)	41%	Tie
Modal Mais/Futura	8–10 Aug 2022	1.000	28,2%	19,2%	–	–	0,5%	1,4%	0,2%	0,8%	7,9% (Note: Eliana Ferreira (PSTU) with 3,3%; Cristiane Brasil (PTB) with 3%; Luiz Carlos "Mancha" Prates (PSTU) with 1,1% and Antônio Carlos Silva (PCO) with 0,5%)	41,7%	9%
Genial/Quaest	5–8 Aug 2022	2.000	29%	12%	10%	3%	1%	1%	0%	–	6% (Note: Cristiane Brasil (PTB) with 3% and Heni Ozi Cukier (PODE) with 3%)	37%	17%
23 Jul–4 Aug 2022	Paulo Skaf had his candidacy for the Senate replaced by the candidacy of Marcos Pontes. Edson Aparecido is chosen as a candidate for the Senate on Rodrigo Garcia's ticket.												
Pollster/client(s)	Date(s) conducted	Sample size	França PSB	Pontes PL	Skaf Republicanos	Paschoal PRTB	Nise PROS	Aldo PDT	Milton UNIÃO	Mellão NOVO	Others	Abst. Undec.	Lead
Real Time Big Data	1–2 Aug 2022	2.000	26%	10%	–	16%	1%	1%	4%	1%	4% (Note: José Aníbal (PSDB) with 3% and Heni Ozi Cukier (PODE) with 1%)	37%	10%
Paraná Pesquisas	25–28 Jul 2022	1.880	24,9%	9,9%	–	10,6%	1,9%	3,5%	5,1%	0,9%	1,4% (Note: Heni Ozi Cukier (PODE) with 1,4%)	41,7%	14,3%
23 Jul 2022	Marcos Pontes is announced as the Liberal Party's candidate for the Senate.												
Pollster/client(s)	Date(s) conducted	Sample size	França PSB	Zambelli PL	Skaf Republicanos	Paschoal PRTB	Nise PROS	Aldo PDT	Milton UNIÃO	Mellão NOVO	Others	Abst. Undec.	Lead
Badra Comunicação	21–23 Jul 2022	2.666	28,5%	10,3%	–	9,2%	1,9%	3%	8,7%	2,5%	14,8% (Note: Marco Feliciano (PL) with 9,1%, José Aníbal (PSDB) with 3,6% and Heni Ozi Cukier (PODE) with 2,1%)	21,2%	13,7%
Real Time Big Data	8–9 Jul 2022	1.500	23%	–	12%	13%	2%	2%	5%	1%	4% (Note: José Aníbal (PSDB) with 3% and Heni Ozi Cukier (PODE) with 1%)	36%	10%
Real Time Big Data	8–9 Jul 2022	1.500	23%	8%	–	14%	2%	2%	5%	1%	5% (Note: José Aníbal (PSDB) with 4% and Heni Ozi Cukier (PODE) with 1%)	40%	9%
Real Time Big Data	8–9 Jul 2022	1.500	24%	–	–	15%	2%	2%	5%	1%	10% (Note: Marco Feliciano (PL) with 5%, José Aníbal (PSDB) with 4% and Heni Ozi Cukier (PODE) with 1%)	41%	9%
Real Time Big Data	8–9 Jul 2022	1.500	23%	–	–	14%	2%	2%	5%	1%	12% (Note: Marcos Pontes (PL) with 8%, José Aníbal (PSDB) with 3% and Heni Ozi Cukier (PODE) with 1%)	41%	9%
Genial/Quaest	1–4 Jul 2022	1.640	27%	9%	13%	7%	1%	3%	5%	1%	2% (Note: José Aníbal (PSDB) with 1% and Heni Ozi Cukier (PODE) with 1%)	29%	14%
Genial/Quaest	1–4 Jul 2022	1.640	30%	10%	14%	8%	–	3%	–	–	2% (Note: José Aníbal (PSDB) with 2%)	28%	16%
Genial/Quaest	1–4 Jul 2022	1.640	42%	–	–	15%	–	6%	–	–	4% (Note: José Aníbal (PSDB) with 4%)	34%	27%
Paraná Pesquisas	27–30 Jun 2022	1.820	14%	–	6,6%	9,3%	1,8%	1,2%	4,1%	0,4%	43,2% (Note: José Luiz Datena (PSC) with 25%, Marina Silva (REDE) with 17,4% and Heni Ozi Cukier (PODE) with 0,8%)	19,5%	29,2%
Paraná Pesquisas	27–30 Jun 2022	1.820	–	–	–	11%	2,2%	–	5,5%	1,1%	53,5% (Note: José Luiz Datena (PSC) with 32% and Marina Silva (REDE) with 21,5%)	26,6%	42,5%
30 Jun 2022	José Luiz Datena withdraws his candidacy.												
Pollster/client(s)	Date(s) conducted	Sample size	Datena PSC	França PSB	Zambelli PL	Skaf Republicanos	Paschoal PRTB	Nise PROS	Milton UNIÃO	Mellão NOVO	Others	Abst. Undec.	Lead
EXAME/IDEIA	3–8 Jun 2022	1.200	19%	14%	9%	8%	6%	2%	2%	2%	3% (Note: Aldo Rebelo (PDT) with 2% and Heni Ozi Cukier (PODE) with 1%)	38%	5%
7 Jun 2022	Sergio Moro has his transfer of electoral domicile suspended by a decision of the Regional Electoral Court of the state of São Paulo (TRE-SP) and will not be able to run in the state.												
Pollster/client(s)	Date(s) conducted	Sample size	Datena PSC	Moro UNIÃO	França PSB	Skaf Republicanos	Paschoal PRTB	Nise PROS	Milton UNIÃO	Mellão NOVO	Others	Abst. Undec.	Lead
Paraná Pesquisas	22–26 May 2022	1.880	22,3%	16,5%	13,2%	6,1%	6%	1,1%	–	0,3%	14,1% (Note: Carla Zambelli (PL) with 11,9%; Aldo Rebelo (PDT) with 1,2% and Heni Ozi Cukier (PODE) with 1%)	20,5%	5,8%
Paraná Pesquisas	22–26 May 2022	1.880	26,8%	–	15,2%	7,2%	6,5%	1,3%	3,5%	0,4%	14,7% (Note: Carla Zambelli (PL) with 12,6%; Aldo Rebelo (PDT) with 1,2% and Heni Ozi Cukier (PODE) with 0,9%)	24,5%	11,6%
Paraná Pesquisas	22–26 May 2022	1.880	32,4%	–	18,1%	–	10,8%	2,6%	4,4%	0,7%	–	30,9%	14,3%
Real Time Big Data	20–21 May 2022	1.500	29%	20%	16%	–	6%	2%	–	1%	3% (Note: Aldo Rebelo (PDT) with 2% and Heni Ozi Cukier (PODE) with 1%)	23%	9%
Real Time Big Data	20–21 May 2022	1.500	–	–	–	14%	9%	–	4%	1%	34% (Note: Fernando Haddad (PT) with 33% and Heni Ozi Cukier (PODE) with 1%)	38%	20%
Real Time Big Data	20–21 May 2022	1.500	33%	–	21%	–	8%	–	5%	1%	1% (Note: Heni Ozi Cukier (PODE) with 1%)	31%	12%
Real Time Big Data	20–21 May 2022	1.500	27%	–	–	–	10%	–	5%	1%	25% (Note: Fernando Haddad (PT) with 24% and Heni Ozi Cukier (PODE) with 1%)	32%	2%
Quaest/Genial	6–9 May 2022	1.640	28%	16%	11%	10%	5%	–	–	1%	11% (Note: Marina Silva (REDE) with 10% and Heni Ozi Cukier (PODE) with 1%)	19%	12%
Quaest/Genial	6–9 May 2022	1.640	–	–	–	22%	9%	–	–	2%	30% (Note: Marina Silva (REDE) with 27% and Heni Ozi Cukier (PODE) with 3%)	38%	8%
Instituto Gerp	25–29 Apr 2022	1.600	17%	14%	11%	8%	6%	2%	3%	1%	2% (Note: Aldo Rebelo (PDT) with 1% and Arthur Weintraub (PMB) with 1%)	36%	3%
Paraná Pesquisas	24–29 Apr 2022	1.820	29%	21,8%	13,7%	–	8,5%	2,7%	–	0,4%	–	23,9%	7,2%
Paraná Pesquisas	24–29 Apr 2022	1.820	34,5%	–	16,3%	–	10,1%	2,9%	6,5%	0,6%	–	29,2%	18,2%
1 Apr 2022	José Luiz Datena leaves Brazil Union (UNIÃO) and decides to join Social Christian Party (PSC).												
Pollster/client(s)	Date(s) conducted	Sample size	Datena UNIÃO	França PSB	Paschoal PRTB	Skaf MDB	Haddad PT	Nise PTB	Milton UNIÃO	Mellão NOVO	Others	Abst. Undec.	Lead
Paraná Pesquisas	27–31 Mar 2022	1.820	32%	15,4%	11,2%	10,2%	–	–	–	1,4%	0,4% (Note: Heni Ozi Cukier (PODE) with 0,4%)	29,4%	16,6%
Paraná Pesquisas	27–31 Mar 2022	1.820	34,6%	19,3%	12,3%	–	–	–	–	–	–	33,7%	15,3%
Real Time Big Data	25–27 Mar 2022	1.500	32%	19%	6%	11%	–	2%	–	1%	1% (Note: Heni Ozi Cukier (PODE) with 1%)	28%	13%
Real Time Big Data	25–27 Mar 2022	1.500	33%	–	7%	12%	20%	–	–	–	–	28%	13%
Real Time Big Data	25–27 Mar 2022	1.500	27%	–	11%	18%	–	–	–	–	5% (Note: José Aníbal (PSDB) with 5%)	39%	9%
Quaest/Genial	11–14 Mar 2022	1.640	39%	15%	6%	13%	–	–	–	2%	1% (Note: Heni Ozi Cukier (PODE) with 1%)	24%	24%
Quaest/Genial	11–14 Mar 2022	1.640	42%	21%	8%	–	–	–	–	3%	–	26%	21%

2021

Pollster/client(s)	Date(s) conducted	Sample size	Datena PSL	Moro PODE	França PSB	Boulos PSOL	Suplicy PT	Skaf MDB	Paschoal PSL	Serra PSDB	Others	Abst. Undec.	Lead
Paraná Pesquisas	13–17 Dec 2021	1.818	25,7%	19,8%	–	–	–	7,4%	7,7%	–	18,5% (Note: Fernando Haddad (PT) with 17,7% and José Aníbal (PSDB) with 0,8%)	21%	5,9%
EXAME/IDEIA	23–26 Aug 2021	2.000	–	–	19%	17%	15%	11%	8%	4%	7% (Note: Mario Covas Neto (PODE) with 2%; Maurren Maggi (PSB) with 2%; Marta Suplicy (Ind.) with 2%; Janaína Lima (NOVO) with 1% and Luiz Felipe D'Ávila (Ind.) with 1%)	19%	2%
Paraná Pesquisas	7–10 Jun 2021	1.818	29,1%	–	–	–	19%	–	10,1%	8,3%	11,2% (Note: Mário Covas Neto (PODE) with 4,9%; Marta Suplicy (Ind.) with 4,2% and Maurren Maggi (PSB) with 2,1%)	22,3%	10,1%
Paraná Pesquisas	7–10 Jun 2021	1.818	–	–	–	–	23,5%	–	12,2%	10,9%	21,5% (Note: Mario Covas Neto (PODE) with 8,9%; Marta Suplicy (Ind.) with 5,4%; Baleia Rossi (MDB) with 3,8% and Maurren Maggi (PSB) with 3,4%)	31,9%	11,3%

== Results ==
=== Governor ===
Candidate	Running mate	Party	First round		Second round	
Candidate	Running mate	Party	Votes	%	Votes	%
Tarcísio de Freitas	Felício Ramuth (PSD)	Republicanos	9,881,995	42.32	13,480,190	55.27
Fernando Haddad	Lúcia França (PSB)	PT	8,337,139	35.70	10,908,972	44.73
Rodrigo Garcia (incumbent)	Geninho Zuliani (UNIÃO)	PSDB	4,296,293	18.40		
Vinicius Poit	Doris Alves	NOVO	388,974	1.67		
Elvis Cezar	Gleides Sodré	PDT	281,712	1.21		
Carol Vigliar	Eloiza Alves	UP	88,767	0.38		
Gabriel Colombo	Aline Miglioli	PCB	46,727	0.20		
Altino Prazeres	Flávia Bischain	PSTU	14,859	0.06		
Antonio Jorge	Vitor Rocca	DC	10,778	0.05		
Edson Dorta	Lilian Miranda	PCO	5,305	0.02		
Total			23,352,549	100.00	24,389,162	100.00
Valid votes			23,352,549	86.02	24,389,162	89.20
Invalid votes			2,149,776	7.92	1,849,223	6.76
Blank votes			1,645,522	6.06	1,102,462	4.03
Total votes			27,147,847	100.00	27,340,847	100.00
Registered voters/turnout			34,639,761	78.37	34,639,761	78.93
Republicanos gain from PSDB						
Source: Superior Electoral Court

Popular vote (first round)
Freitas	42.32%
Haddad	35.70%
Garcia	18.40%
Others	3.59%

Popular vote (second round)
Freitas	55.27%
Haddad	44.73%

=== Senator ===
Candidate	Party	Votes	%
Marcos Pontes	PL	10,714,913	49.68
Márcio França	PSB	7,822,518	36.27
Edson Aparecido	MDB	1,655,224	7.67
Janaína Paschoal	PRTB	447,550	2.07
Ricardo Mellão	NOVO	311,321	1.44
Vivian Mendes	UP	280,460	1.30
Aldo Rebelo	PDT	230,833	1.07
Tito Bellini	PCB	59,449	0.28
Marco Azkoul	DC	19,337	0.09
Luis Carlos Prates	PSTU	14,598	0.07
Antônio Carlos	PCO	13,280	0.06
Total		21,569,483	100.00
Valid votes		21,569,483	79.45
Invalid votes		3,029,752	11.16
Blank votes		2,548,612	9.39
Total votes		27,147,847	100.00
Registered voters/turnout		34,639,761	78.37
PL gain from PSDB			
Source: Superior Electoral Court

Popular vote
Pontes	49.68%
França	36.27%
Aparecido	7.67%
Others	6.38%

=== Chamber of Deputies ===
Party or alliance		Votes	%	Seats	+/–
Liberal Party		5,343,667	22.33	17	▲10
Brazil of Hope	Workers' Party	2,941,086	12.29	10	▲2
Brazil of Hope	Communist Party of Brazil	145,727	0.61	0	▼1
Brazil of Hope	Green Party	445,794	1.86	0	▼1
PSOL REDE	Socialism and Liberty Party	1,984,281	8.29	5	▲2
PSOL REDE	Sustainability Network	304,580	1.27	1	▲1
Brazil Union		1,811,462	7.57	6	New
Republicanos		1,580,891	6.61	5	▼1
Brazilian Democratic Movement		1,533,541	6.41	5	▲3
Progressistas		1,174,646	4.91	4	Steady
Always Forward	Brazilian Social Democracy Party	1,061,538	4.44	3	▼3
Always Forward	Cidadania	438,574	1.83	2	Steady
Social Democratic Party		1,055,965	4.41	3	▲1
Podemos		892,443	3.73	3	Steady
Brazilian Socialist Party		732,045	3.06	2	▼2
Solidariedade		379,310	1.58	1	Steady
New Party		361,268	1.51	1	▼2
Republican Party of the Social Order		303,613	1.27	1	▲1
Social Christian Party		293,192	1.23	1	Steady
Democratic Labour Party		285,820	1.19	0	▼1
Avante		241,814	1.01	0	Steady
Patriota		228,947	0.96	0	Steady
Brazilian Labour Party		217,212	0.91	0	Steady
Brazilian Labour Renewal Party		48,843	0.20	0	Steady
Agir		33,343	0.14	0	Steady
Popular Unity		24,142	0.10	–	Steady
Brazilian Woman's Party		18,698	0.08	0	Steady
Brazilian Communist Party		15,510	0.06	0	Steady
Party of National Mobilization		15,463	0.06	0	Steady
United Socialist Workers' Party		8,790	0.04	0	Steady
Christian Democracy		5,269	0.02	0	Steady
Workers' Cause Party		4,187	0.02	0	Steady
Total		23,931,661	100.00	70	–
Valid votes		23,931,661	87.53		
Invalid votes		1,483,597	5.43		
Blank votes		1,926,945	7.05		
Total votes		27,342,203	100.00		
Registered voters/turnout		34,639,761	78.93		
Source: Superior Electoral Court

=== Legislative Assembly ===
Party or alliance		Votes	%	Seats	+/–
Liberal Party		4,114,519	17.81	19	▲13
Brazil of Hope	Workers' Party	3,720,559	16.11	18	▲8
Brazil of Hope	Communist Party of Brazil	229,860	1.00	1	Steady
Brazil of Hope	Green Party	63,603	0.28	0	▼1
Always Forward	Brazilian Social Democracy Party	1,997,660	8.65	9	▲1
Always Forward	Cidadania	461,262	2.00	2	Steady
Republicanos		1,767,011	7.65	8	▲2
Brazil Union		1,685,895	7.30	8	New
PSOL REDE	Socialism and Liberty Party	1,357,853	5.88	5	▲1
PSOL REDE	Sustainability Network	129,956	0.56	1	Steady
Podemos		1,030,595	4.46	4	Steady
Brazilian Democratic Movement		975,207	4.22	4	▲1
Social Democratic Party		940,809	4.07	4	▲2
Brazilian Socialist Party		882,495	3.82	3	▼5
Progressistas		799,148	3.46	3	▼1
Social Christian Party		613,796	2.66	2	▲2
New Party		428,030	1.85	1	▼3
Democratic Labour Party		383,911	1.66	–	Steady
Solidariedade		345,811	1.50	1	Steady
Patriota		234,367	1.01	0	▼1
Brazilian Labour Party		226,704	0.98	0	▼2
Avante		200,838	0.87	0	▼1
Brazilian Labour Renewal Party		186,805	0.81	0	Steady
Republican Party of the Social Order		100,860	0.44	0	▼1
Brazilian Woman's Party		61,020	0.26	0	Steady
Agir		54,870	0.24	0	Steady
Popular Unity		39,545	0.17	0	Steady
Party of National Mobilization		24,807	0.11	0	Steady
Brazilian Communist Party		20,403	0.09	0	Steady
United Socialist Workers' Party		10,631	0.05	0	Steady
Christian Democracy		3,673	0.02	0	Steady
Workers' Cause Party		3,673	0.02	0	Steady
Total		23,096,176	100.00	93	–
Valid votes		23,096,176	85.70		
Invalid votes		1,610,703	5.98		
Blank votes		2,244,465	8.33		
Total votes		26,951,344	100.00		
Registered voters/turnout		34,639,761	77.80		
Source: Superior Electoral Court
