= Poit =

Poit may refer to:

- Vinicius Poit, a Brazilian politician and entrepreneur
- Poit, a pre-Islamic ruler of Ternate
- Poit., the author abbreviation for French botanist Pierre Antoine Poiteau
- Poit, a vocalization by the unicolored jay
- "Poit", a verbal tic of Pinky from Pinky and the Brain
- Post- och Inrikes Tidningar (PoIT), Sweden's official government newspaper and gazette
- Peanut oral immunotherapy (POIT), a type of allergy immunotherapy to treat peanut allergies

== See also ==
- Teochew Poit Ip Huay Kuan
