= Sérgio Victor =

Brazilian politician (born 1987)

Mayor of Taubaté
- Incumbent
- Assumed office 1 January 2025
- Vice Mayor: Oiveira Neto
- Preceded by: José Saud

State Deputy of São Paulo
- In office 15 March 2019 – 15 March 2023
- Constituency: At-large

Personal details
- Born: Sérgio Luiz Victor Júnior; 18 June 1987 (age 39) Tremembé, São Paulo, Brazil
- Party: NOVO (since 2016)

Sérgio Luiz Victor Júnior (born 18 June 1987) is a Brazilian politician serving as mayor of Taubaté since 2025. From 2019 to 2023, he was a member of the Legislative Assembly of São Paulo.

== Electoral history ==
| Year | Election | Party | Office | Coalition | Partners | Party | Votes | Percent | Result |
|---|---|---|---|---|---|---|---|---|---|
| 2018 | State Elections of São Paulo | NOVO | Federal Deputy | —N/a | | | 29,909 | 0.14% | Elected |
| 2022 | State Elections of São Paulo | NOVO | Federal Deputy | —N/a | | | 41,671 | 0.18% | Surrogate |
| 2024 | Municipal Election of Taubaté | NOVO | Mayor | A New Path for Taubaté (NOVO, PDT) | Oliveira Neto | NOVO | 37,399 | 23.52% | Runoff |
| 2024 | Municipal Election of Taubaté | NOVO | Mayor | A New Path for Taubaté (NOVO, PDT) | Oliveira Neto | NOVO | 97,450 | 61.98% | Elected |
