= Altair Moraes =

Brazilian politician and former karateka

- Moraes in 2026

Member-elect of the Chamber of Deputies
- Assuming office 1 February 2027
- Constituency: São Paulo

Member of the Legislative Assembly of São Paulo
- Incumbent
- Assumed office 15 March 2019
- Constituency: São Paulo

Personal details
- Born: Altair Moraes de Oliveira; September 25, 1969 (age 57) Recife, Pernambuco, Brazil
- Party: Republicanos (2016–present)
- Profession: Pastor; television commentator; karateka
- Website: altairmoraes.com

Altair Moraes de Oliveira (25 September 1969) is a Brazilian politician, pastor, and former karateka affiliated with the Republicans party. He served as a state deputy for São Paulo, and in 2026, he was elected to serve as a federal deputy for São Paulo.

== Biography ==
Born in Recife, the capital of the state of Pernambuco, in 1969, Altair began competing as a karate athlete at the age of 11, going on to win the “North-Northeast” competition ten times in his weight class. In addition to sports, in the religious sphere, Altair is an evangelical pastor affiliated with the Universal Church of the Kingdom of God (IURD). He works as a commentator on TV Record programs such as Balanço Geral and Cidade Alerta.

=== Political ===
A member of the Republicans party, he was elected to the Legislative Assembly of São Paulo (Alesp) in 2018 with 86,230 votes. In 2022, he ran for reelection and was re-elected after receiving 98,515 votes. A member of the same party as Tarcísio de Freitas, during the 2022 gubernatorial campaign, Tarcísio assured that Altair would be the leader of his administration in the Alesp. Although Tarcísio himself had floated Altair’s name, once elected governor, he opted for a more “moderate” candidate to lead his caucus in Alesp, choosing Jorge Wilson, also a member of the Republicans. In the 2026 election, Altair was elected to the federal deputy from São Paulo after receiving more than 90,000 votes.

==== Electoral perforamnce ====
Year	Election	Party	Office	Votes	Percent	Result
2018	State Elections of São Paulo	Republicanos	State Deputy	86,230	0.41%	Elected
2022	State Elections of São Paulo	Republicanos	State Deputy	98,515	0.42%	Elected
2026	State Elections of São Paulo	Republicanos	Federal Deputy	94,770	0.40%	Elected
