= Geninho Zuliani =

Brazilian politician (born 1976)

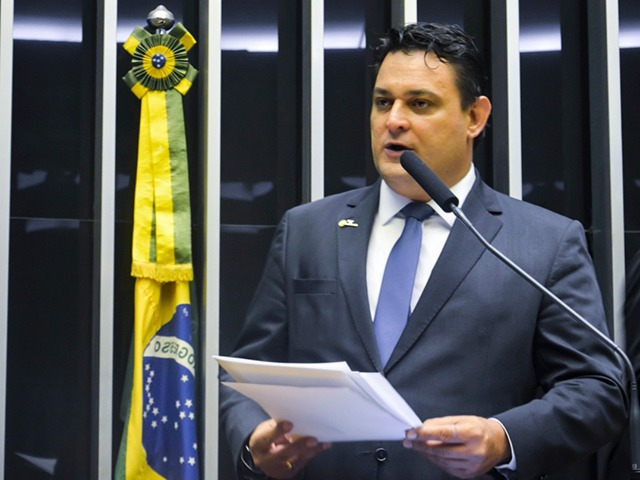
- Zuliani in 2019

Member of the Chamber of Deputies
- In office 1 February 2019 – 31 January 2023
- Constituency: São Paulo

Personal details
- Born: 13 January 1976 (age 50)
- Party: Brazil Union (since 2022)

Eugênio José Zuliani, better known as Geninho Zuliani (born 13 January 1976), is a Brazilian politician. He has served as mayor of Olímpia since 2025, having previously served from 2009 to 2016. From 2019 to 2023, he was a member of the Chamber of Deputies.
