= Ricardo Mellão =

Brazilian politician (born 1985)

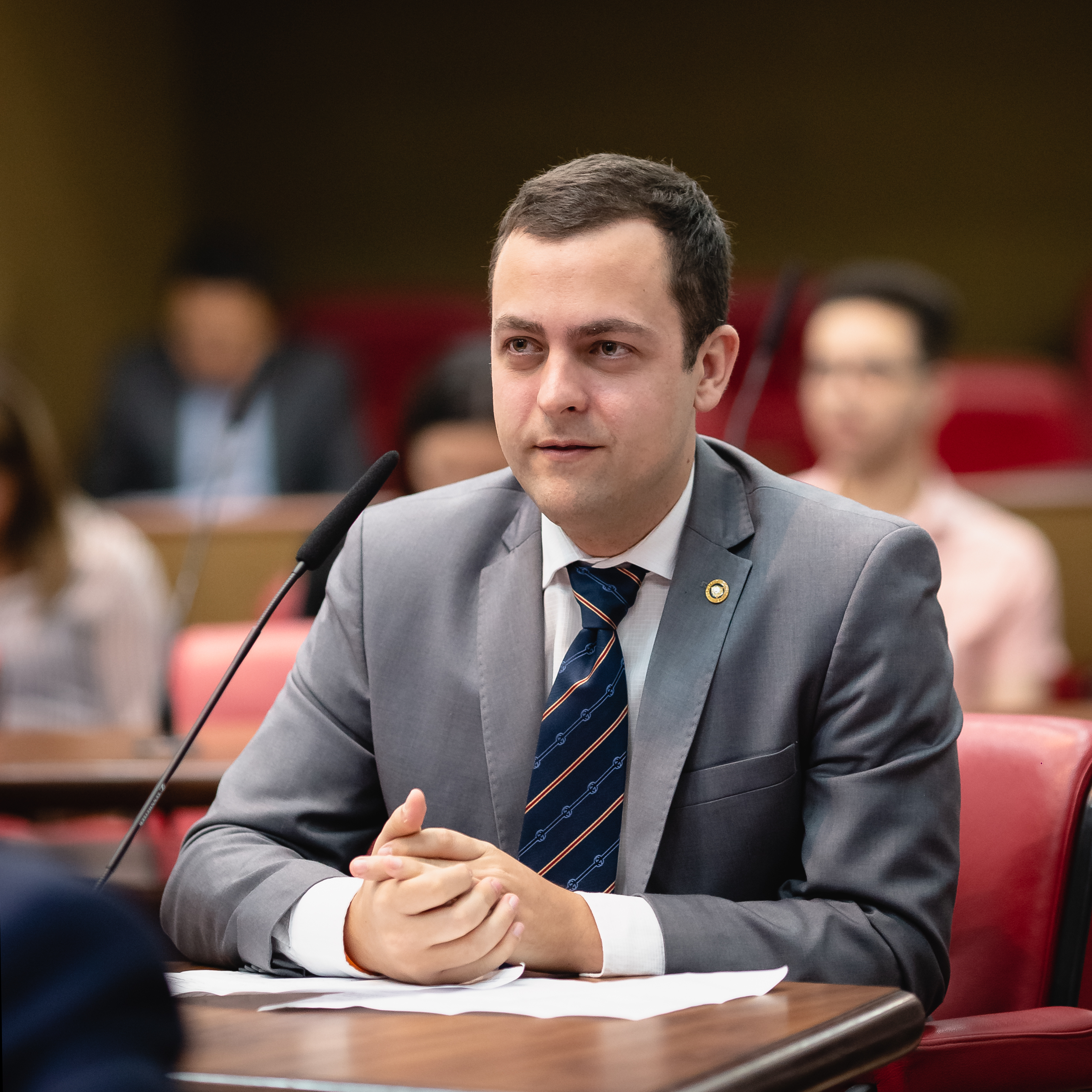
- Mellão in 2019

Member of the Legislative Assembly of São Paulo
- In office 15 March 2019 – 15 March 2023

Personal details
- Born: 15 August 1985 (age 40)
- Party: New Party (since 2016)
- Parent: João Mellão Neto (father)

Ricardo Luís Mellão (born 15 August 1985) is a Brazilian politician. From 2019 to 2023, he was a member of the Legislative Assembly of São Paulo. He is the son of João Mellão Neto.
