= Vinicius Poit =

Brazilian politician

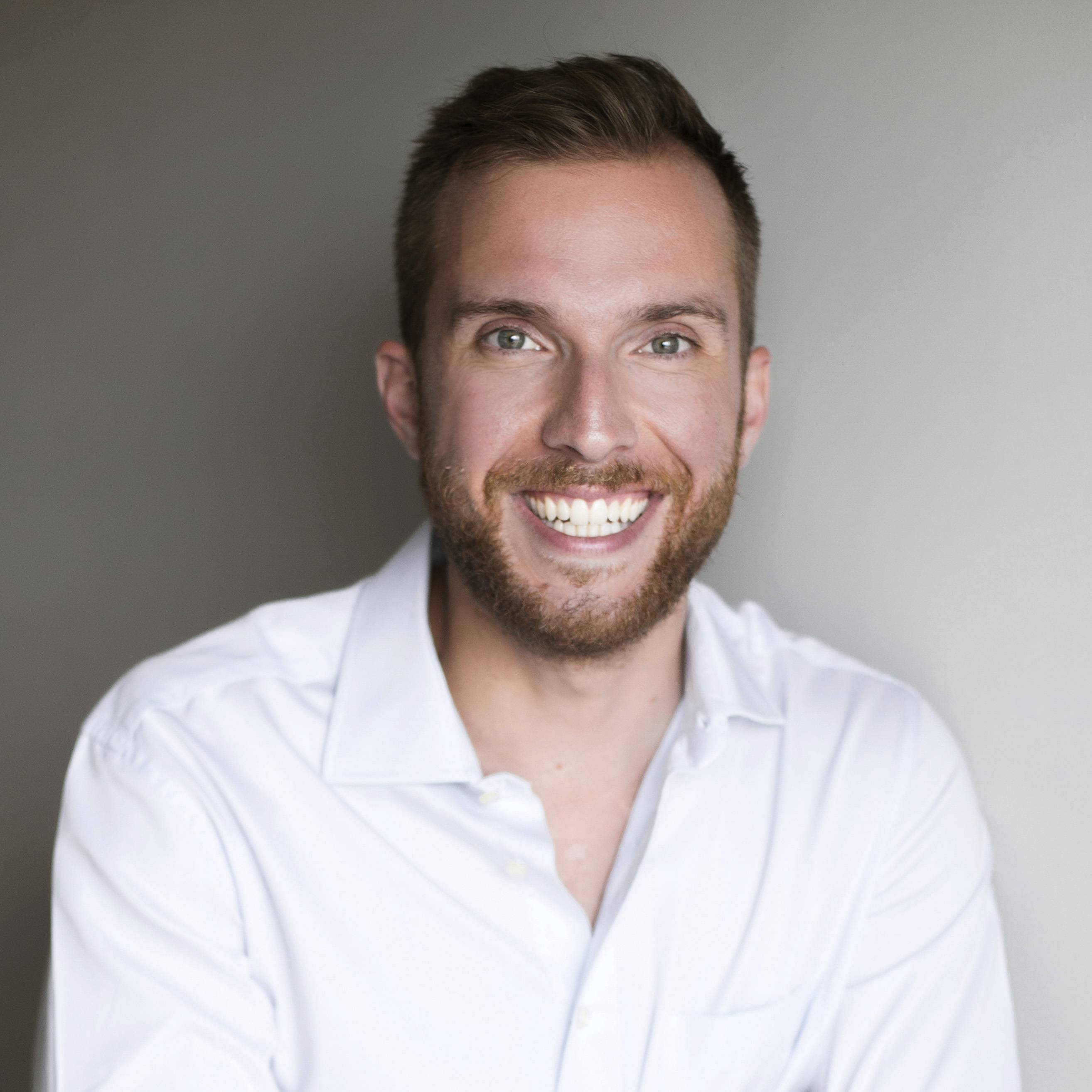
- Poit in May 2018

Federal Deputy for São Paulo
- In office 1 February 2019 – 2022

Personal details
- Born: 31 January 1986 (age 40) São Bernardo do Campo, São Paulo, Brazil
- Party: NOVO (2016–present)
- Education: Fundação Getúlio Vargas (BBA)
- Website: www.viniciuspoit.com.br

Vinicius Lazzer Poit (born 31 January 1986 in São Bernardo do Campo) is a Brazilian politician and entrepreneur. He has spent his political career representing São Paulo, having served as federal deputy representative from 2019-2022.

== Personal life ==
Poit is a graduate of Fundação Getúlio Vargas, and before being a politician worked as a businessperson coach to teach individuals how to be entrepreneur, and is the founder of Recruit Simple, an online platform for rapid recruitment.

== Political career ==
Poit was elected to be federal deputy for the state of São Paulo, being elected with 207,118 votes for 2019-2022.
