= 2019 student protests in Brazil =

2019 Brazilian student protests
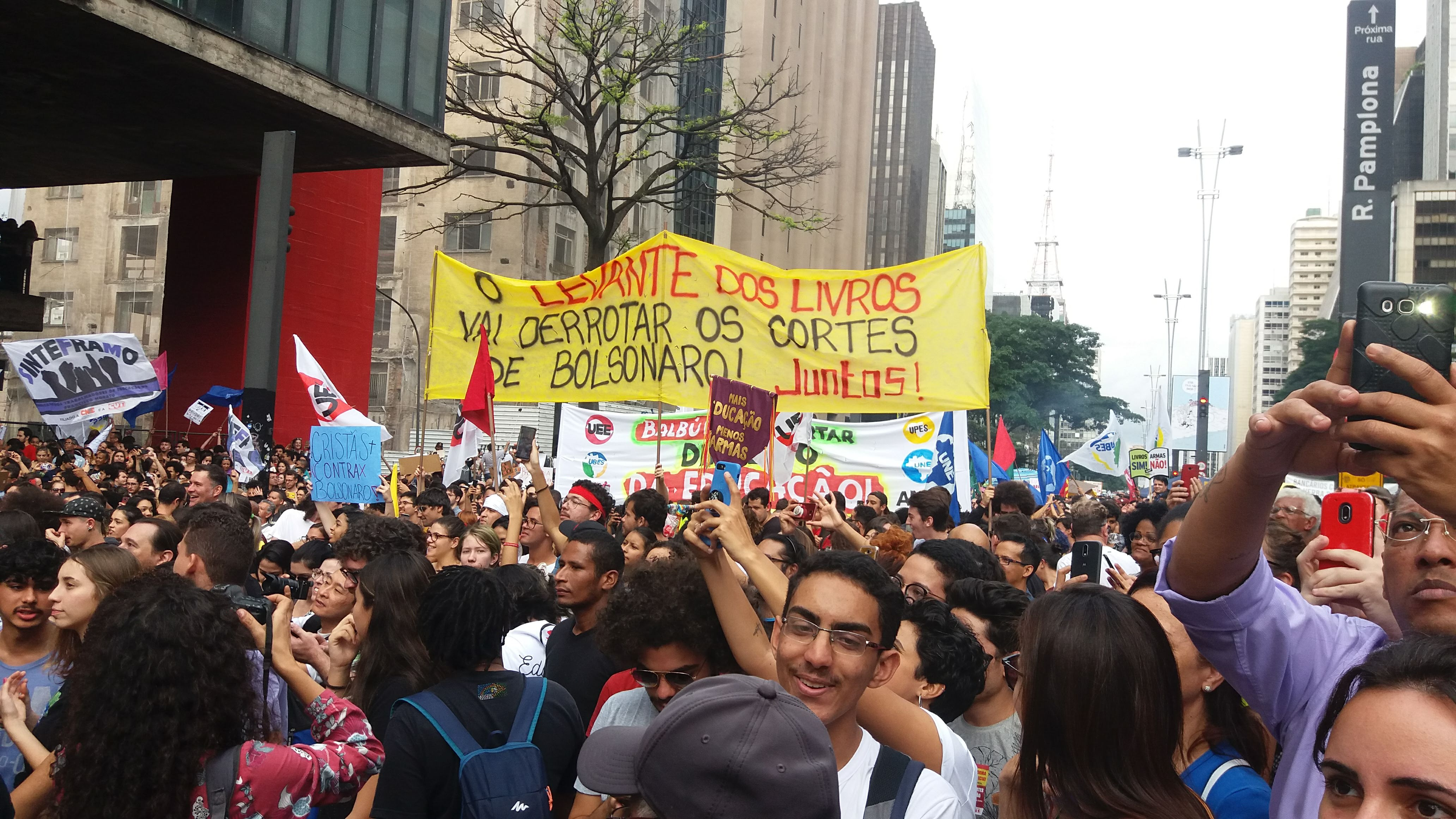
- Demonstration against education budget cuts on Avenida Paulista in São Paulo, SP.
- Date: May – October 2019
- Location: Brazil
- Goals: Opposition to education budget cuts; Opposition to funding freezes for Science and Technology; Opposition to pension reform

Parties
| Jair Bolsonaro administration | National Union of Students (UNE), Brazilian Union of Secondary Students (UBES), and trade unions |

Number
| | 1,500,000 (according to organizers) |

The student protests in Brazil in 2019, popularly known as the Education Tsunami, took place on May 15, May 30, and August 13, and were the first major mobilization against the Jair Bolsonaro administration. Due to cuts in education from primary to higher education and freezes in science and technology development, there was a shutdown in higher and primary education, accompanied by protests led by students and education professionals.

The National Union of Students (UNE), the Brazilian Union of Secondary Students (UBES), and trade unions called for demonstrations, which were joined by other entities and institutions. The protests are related to cuts in the education and research budget decreed by Minister Abraham Weintraub. In education, government cuts amount to 7.4 billion reais. Investments in research, such as grants from the Coordenação de Aperfeicoamento de Pessoal de Nível Superior (CAPES), were cut, affecting future researchers. While state military police did not estimate the number of protesters, the UNE said that there were 1.8 million people on the streets in more than 200 cities in all states of the country and the Federal District.

== Background ==
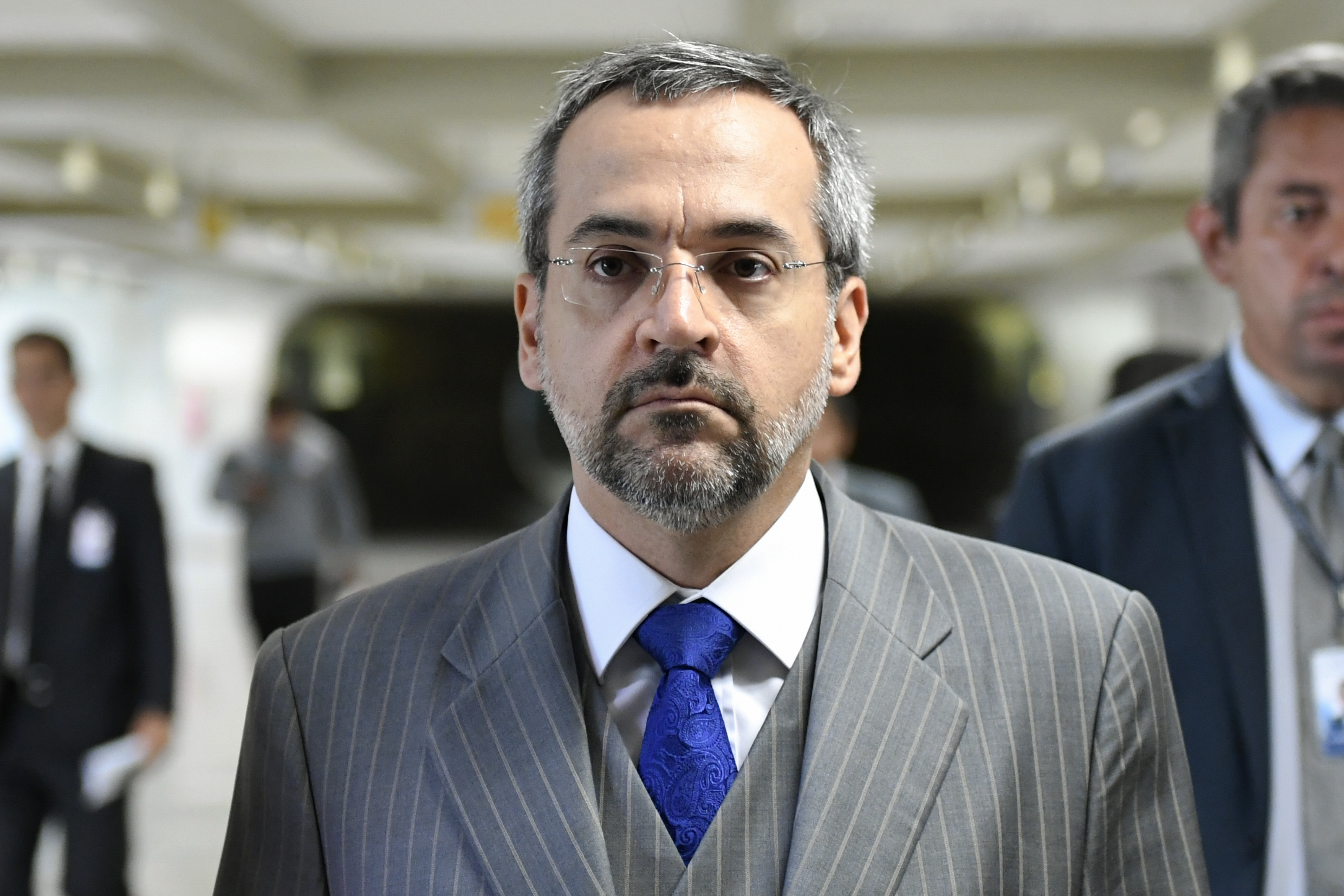
Abraham Weintraub, then Minister of Education during the protests.

At the end of April 2019, the new administration of the Ministry of Education (MEC), under the command of Abraham Weintraub, appointed by Jair Bolsonaro, announced a 30% cut in funding for federal educational institutions, including 60 universities and nearly 40 institutes across the country. Initially, the minister had announced funding cuts for the Fluminense Federal University (UFF), the Federal University of Bahia(UFBA), and the University of Brasília (UnB), which, according to him, "were causing trouble," an expression that angered researchers and was considered unfortunate by members of the government.

Subsequently, the cut was extended to all federal universities. According to the National Association of Directors of Federal Higher Education Institutions (Andifes), the contingency reached 20% of the budget for operating costs (i.e., maintenance, cleaning, security, among others), and 90% of the investment budget (costs of construction, renovation, or building, for example). These costs are considered discretionary expenses by the government, meaning they are not mandatory, with the freeze corresponding to about 3.5% of the total budget, which would be "held back" to be released after September. In May, the Ministry of Education announced that it was also considering "decentralizing" investments in philosophy and sociology courses, which prompted a manifesto against the proposal signed by representatives of world-renowned universities such as Harvard University, Yale University, Massachusetts Institute of Technology, University of Oxford, University of Cambridge, Sorbonne, Columbia University, and University of California, Berkeley.

The Minister of Education, Weintraub, was summoned to Congress to provide explanations about the cuts in the sector, after a vote in favor of the summons by 307 deputies, against 82. The session took place at the same time as protests were taking place across Brazil.

== Protests ==
=== May 15 ===
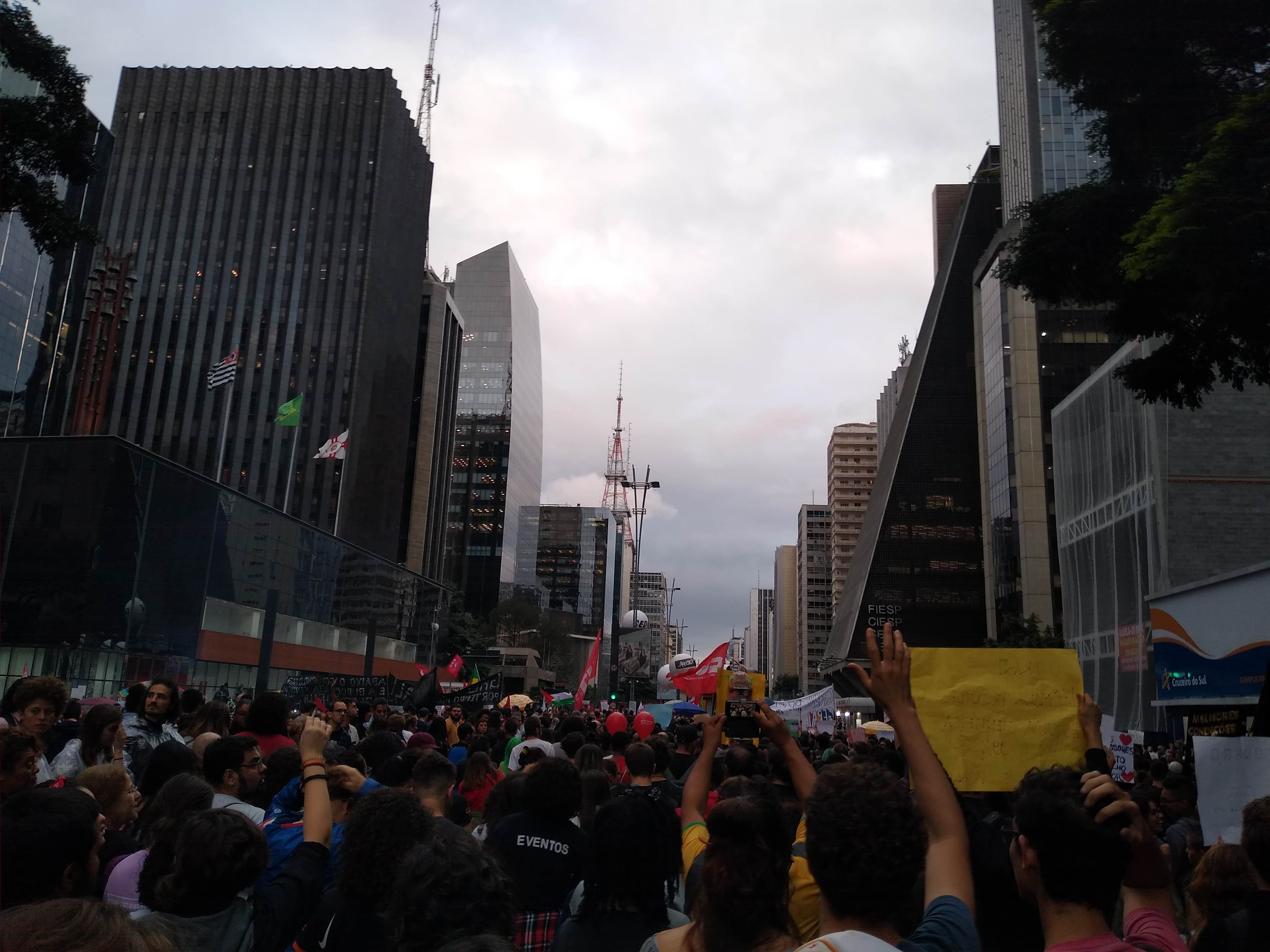
Protest on Paulista Avenue, São Paulo.

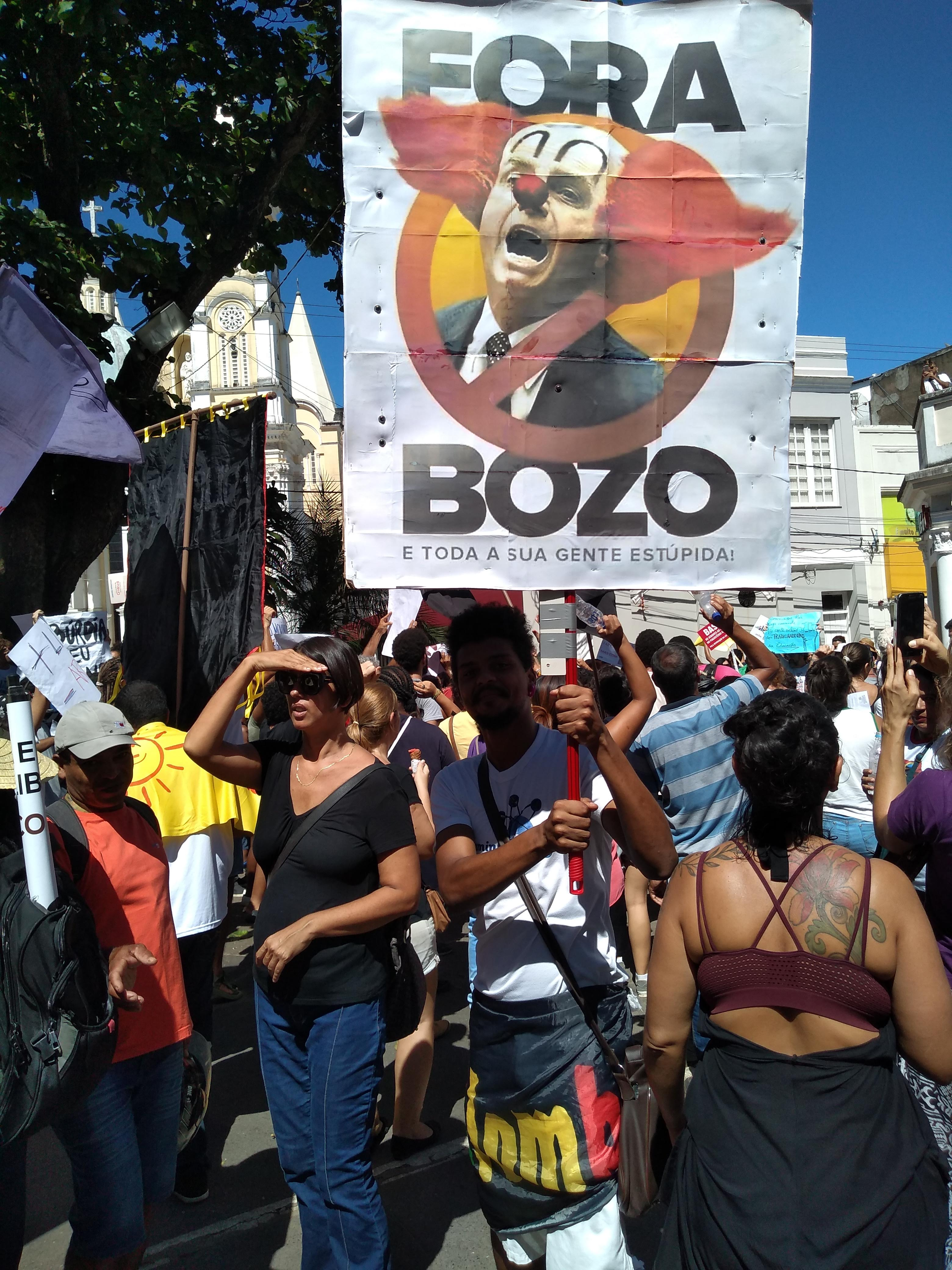
Protestor against Bolsonaro in Ilhéus, Bahia.

On May 15, a member of Bolsonaro's allied base, Capitão Wagner, saw the president calling his minister, Weintraub, saying that there would be no budget cuts, which suggested that the government had backed down, something that was commonplace in its early days; later, the minister, in a hearing in the Chamber of Deputies, said that Bolsonaro was overheard talking to him, and not him talking to Bolsonaro, saying that the cuts would happen. Wagner said that it was not he who started a rumor, but rather the government itself, which backtracked.

Among the slogans used by demonstrators were: "Take the scissors out of your hands and invest in education" and "It's not easy, there's money for the militia, but not for education," alluding to Bolsonaro's possible involvement with militias and the Queiroz Case.

According to the National Union of Students (UNE), 500,000 protesters gathered on Paulista Avenue, and a total of 1.5 million people participated nationwide. Students also crowded Cinelândia, in the city of Rio de Janeiro, with 150,000 protesters according to organizers. At the end of the protest, in downtown Rio de Janeiro, there were clashes between police and protesters, and a bus was set on fire. Protesters fired fireworks and firecrackers, and military police in Rio fired stun grenades and tear gas. In Belo Horizonte, capital of Minas Gerais, organizers estimated the presence of 250,000 protesters. In Brasília, Fortaleza, Salvador, and Recife, organizers estimated that at least 50,000 protesters attended each demonstration, while in Natal, organizers estimated that 70,000 protesters attended each demonstration.

State universities in São Paulo, such as the University of São Paulo (USP), the State University of Campinas (Unicamp), and the São Paulo State University (Unesp), also held protests.

=== May 30 ===
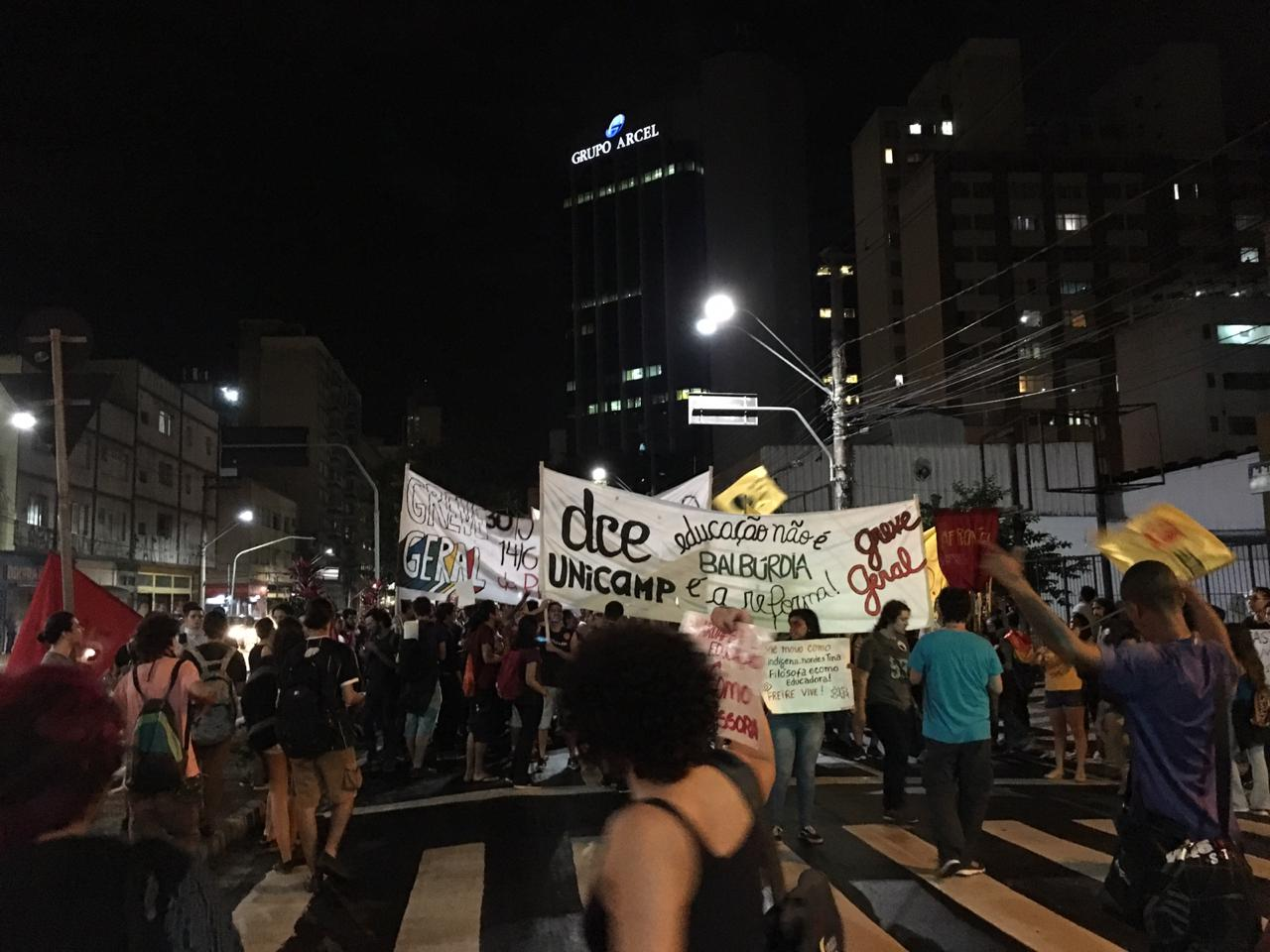
The demonstration in Campinas, São Paulo took place at night.

The National Union of Students and the Brazilian Union of Secondary Students have called for a new protest on May 30. According to estimates by organizers, protests on May 30 spread to 211 cities in 27 states, plus the Federal District. According to estimates by the G1 website, demonstrations took place in 136 cities in 25 states plus the Federal District.

Demonstrations in Salvador and Brasília began in the morning, with organizers estimating attendance at 40,000 and 30,000, respectively. In the afternoon, there were demonstrations in Recife, Pernambuco, where organizers estimated the attendance of 100,000 protesters, and in São Luís, capital of Maranhão, where they estimated the presence of 30,000 protesters.

Most of the demonstrations took place in the late afternoon and early evening, as in the city of Rio de Janeiro, where organizers estimated that 100,000 protesters gathered at the Candelária and marched to Cinelândia, and in the city of São Paulo, where 300,000 gathered at Largo da Batata and marched to Paulista Avenue.

=== June 14 ===
Amidst the events of May 30, new demonstrations were called for June 14. The protests took place during a general strike called by trade unions, unifying student and worker movements. By 8 p.m. that day, According to the Central Única dos Trabalhadores (CUT), one of the event organizers, demonstrations took place in 380 cities across all states of the country and in the Federal District, involving 45 million workers. 19 Brazilian capitals had their bus systems affected, but considering other modes of transport, the number of capitals affected rose to 21.

=== August 13 ===
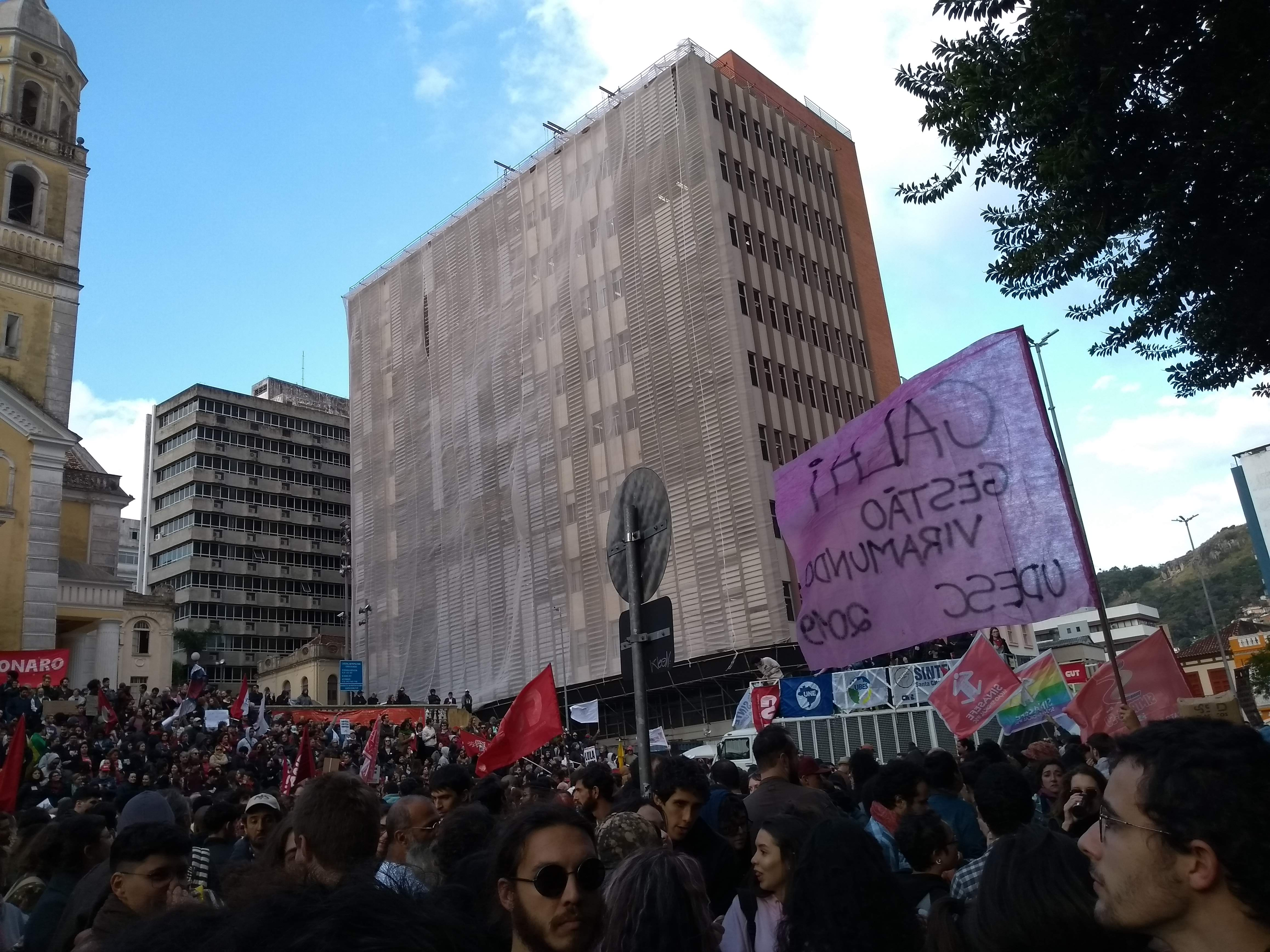
Student protest in the city of Florianópolis, capital of Santa Catarina, on August 13, 2019, against pension reform and cuts in public education funding.

Called by entities such as the UNE and UBES, the protests on August 13 were also against the pension reform bill being debated in Congress. It was the third nationwide mobilization against the budget cuts announced by Weintraub — the protests on June 14 were secondary, as the main event was the 2019 Brazilian general strike. In Brasília, Minister of Justice and Public Security Sergio Moro authorized the use of the National Force to protect the Ministries Esplanade.

According to UNE, 900,000 people attended the demonstrations, which took place in 206 cities across all states, including the Federal District. In Rio, protesters marched from Candelária to the Petrobras building, where they defended the state-owned company. In Brasília, organizers counted 10,000 protesters, while Federal District Military Police (Brazil) estimated 4,000. In Curitiba, in front of the Federal University of Paraná (UFPR) building, banners reading "Moro is a criminal" were raised by protesters. In São Paulo, the demonstration took place on Paulista Avenue in front of the São Paulo Museum of Art (MASP) building, in the direction of Consolação, and was attended by trade unions and politicians from the Workers' Party (PT), such as Luiz Marinho, Beth Sahão, and Professora Bebel. According to UNE, 100,000 people were present on Paulista Avenue.

=== September 7 ===
Demonstrations were called for September 7, Brazil's Independence Day. On September 3, President Jair Bolsonaro asked people to take to the streets dressed in green and yellow to "show the world" that "the Amazon is ours," in response to the international crisis caused by forest fires in the Amazon. In response, the UNE and UBES, seeing parallels with former President Fernando Collor de Mello's request, called for the return of the Caras-pintadas (Painted Faces) and urged protesters to wear black to symbolize mourning for the situation in the Amazon and education.

According to the Central dos Movimentos Populares (CMP), organizer of Cry of the Excluded, 132 cities held demonstrations in which education cuts were also on the agenda, in addition to the traditional march organized by the CMP. In São Paulo, the demonstration was concentrated in Praça Osvaldo Cruz, gathering 15,000 people according to organizers, and ended at the Monument to the Bandeiras in Ibirapuera Park. Portuguese writer Valter hugo mãe was present at the demonstration. In Rio de Janeiro, the demonstration was concentrated in Praça Mauá and included left-wing parties and students.

=== October 2nd and 3rd ===
On October 2 and 3, the Executive Board of UNE and UBES called for 48 hours of national mobilization. According to G1's findings, nine states joined the strike, including Acre, Minas Gerais, Paraíba, Pernambuco, Piauí, Rio Grande do Norte, Rio Grande do Sul, Santa Catarina, and Sergipe.

== Independent mobilizations ==
=== Federal University of Fronteira Sul ===
At Federal University of Fronteira Sul (UFFS), around 200 people occupied the institution's rector's office from August 30 to September 18. The reason was the appointment of Marcelo Recktenvald, who came third in the public consultation, as the institution's new rector. Recktenvald is a Bolsonaro supporter and has participated in demonstrations in favor of Operation Car Wash, as well as being a global warming denier and a student of Olavo de Carvalho, the intellectual guru of the Brazilian far right.

In assemblies held after the end of the occupation, on all six campuses, the academic community of the UFFS) approved by 94.22% the request for the dismissal of Marcelo Recktenvald. Despite the academic council's statement, the constitutional decision to appoint the president of federal universities prevailed, and Recktenvald ended his term as rector in 2023.

== Reactions ==
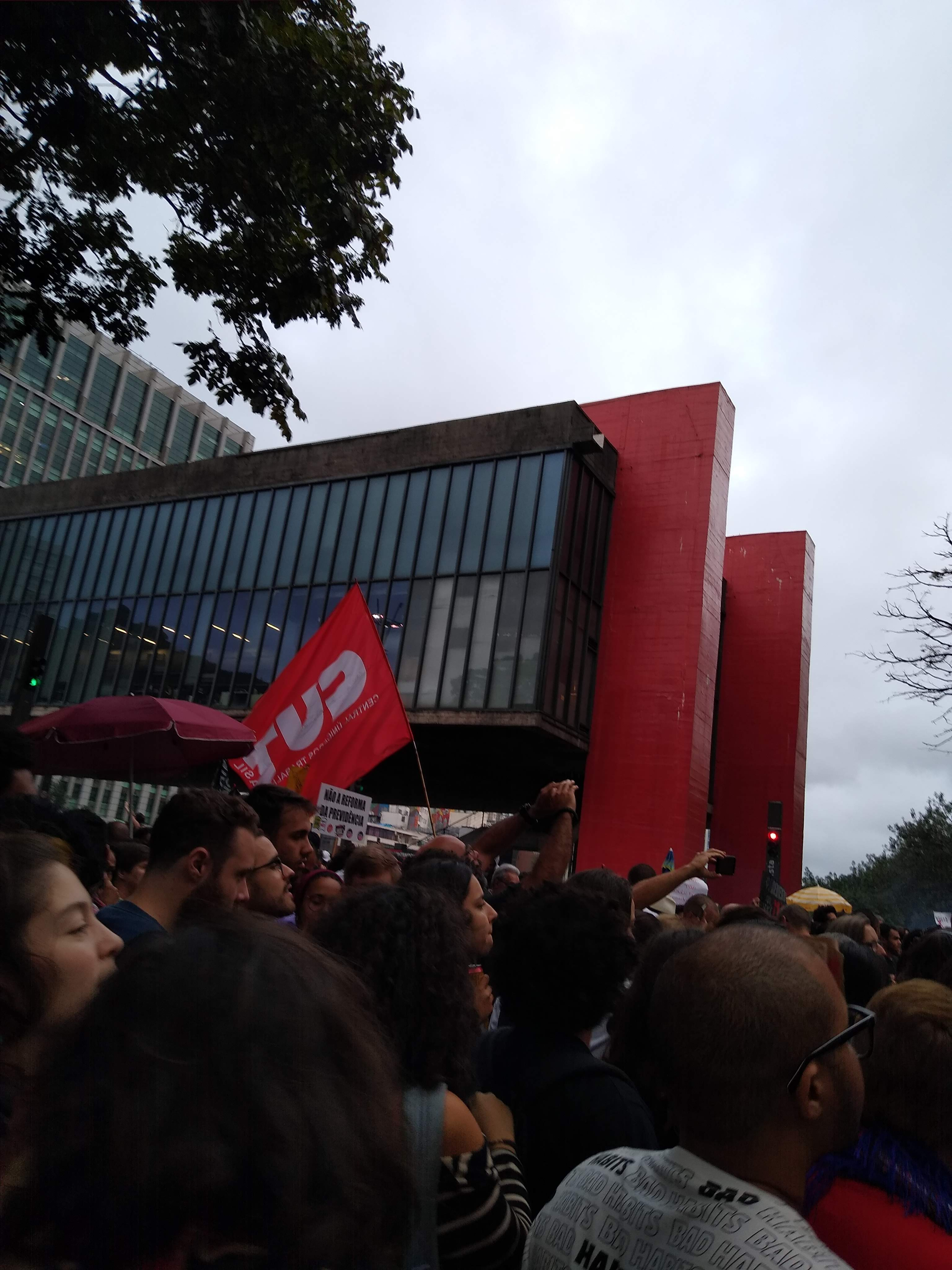
Flag of the Central Única dos Trabalhadores (CUT) during the protest on Paulista Avenue.

The president of the republic, Jair Bolsonaro, was in Dallas, Texas, United States, during the first demonstration (on May 15), where he called the protesters "useful idiots and a mob," which earned him criticism. Vice President Hamilton Mourão, took a different stance in front of the press, stating that "demonstrations are part of the democratic system, as long as they are peaceful, orderly, and do not restrict other people's right to come and go. It is a way for those who feel dissatisfied to express their protest. So, it's normal."

The Free Brazil Movement (MBL), active in the demonstrations calling for the impeachment of Dilma Rousseff, acknowledged that the left wing staged "the largest demonstration in years." The organization also criticized spending cuts: "[...] The government cannot continue to make political mistakes as it is doing today."

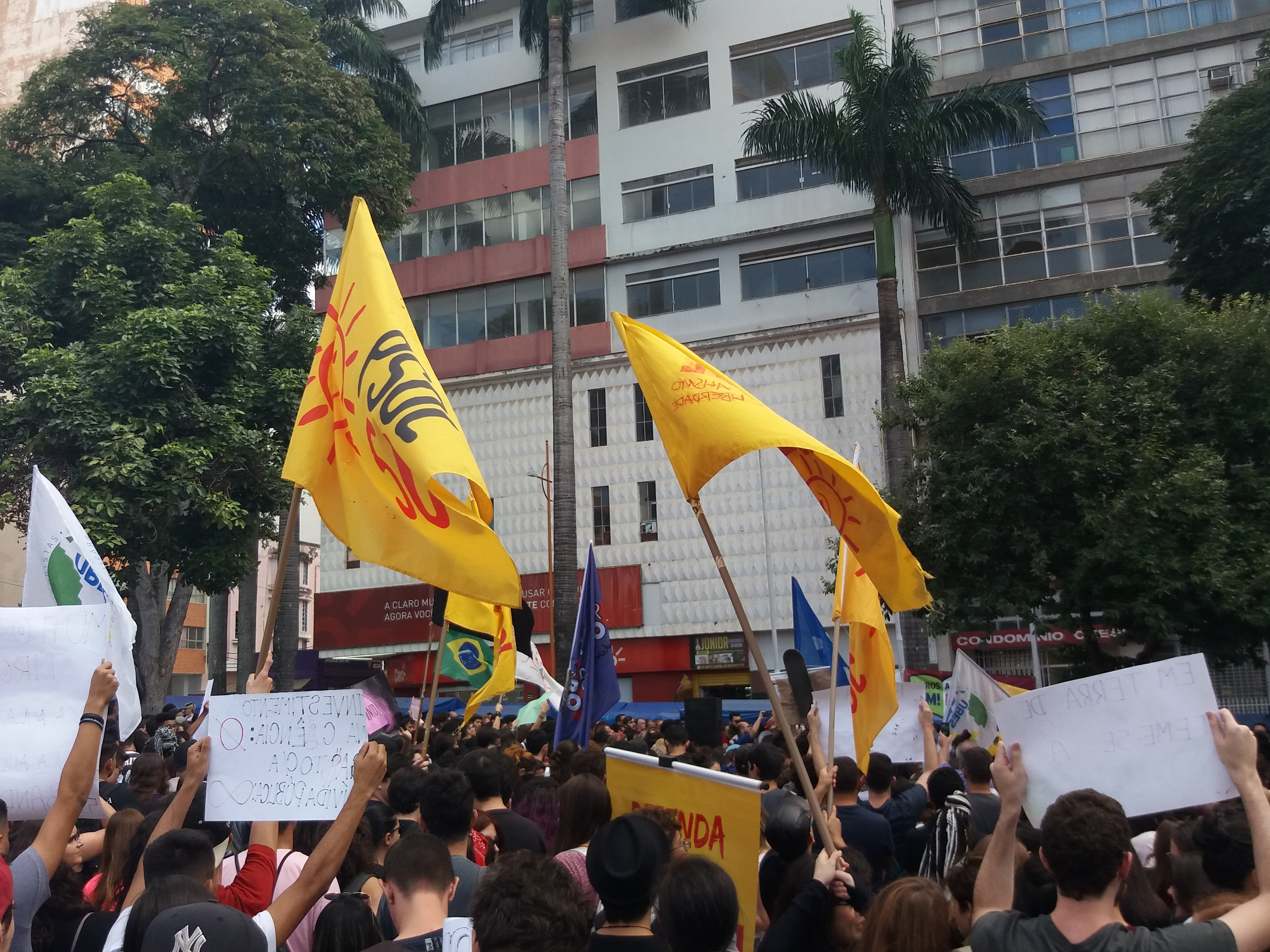
Flags of Brazilian Union of Secondary Students (UBES) and Socialism and Liberty Party (PSOL), in the city of Sorocaba, São Paulo.

Some political parties, mostly from the left, released statements defending the protests: Workers' Party (PT), Communist Party of Brazil (PCdoB), Brazilian Socialist Party (PSB), Brazilian Democratic Movement (MDB), Democratic Labour Party (PDT), Socialism and Liberty Party (PSOL), Green Party (PV), United Socialist Workers' Party (PSTU),Sustainability Network (REDE), Workers' Cause Party (PCO), and Brazilian Communist Party (PCB).

In addition to student movements, social movements and unions such as CUT, Central dos Trabalhadores e Trabalhadoras do Brasil(CTB), Homeless Workers' Movement (MTST), and Landless Workers' Movement (MST) also participated in the demonstrations.

=== Opinion poll ===
A week after the end of the May 15 protests, an opinion poll showed that 57% of respondents believed the protests were important, while 38% believed they were not important and 5% did not respond. The same poll showed that, for the first time, disapproval of the Bolsonaro government exceeded approval.

=== Pro-government demonstrations ===
In response to the protests, supporters of the Bolsonaro administration scheduled a demonstration for May 26 to defend the government and its reforms. Marcelo Ramos, a federal representative from Amazonas, stated: "This protest on May 26 is the most surreal thing I have ever seen in my life. It is a protest in favor of pension reform against those who are in favor of pension reform. It is completely nonsensical. [...] This protest is a protest to generate a climate of questioning democratic institutions and create chaos in the country."

In a survey conducted by G1, acts in support of the government carried out on May 26 were recorded in at least 156 cities in all Brazilian states, plus the Federal District. Among the proposals advocated were pension reform and Minister Sergio Moro's anti-crime package. Minority groups also called for the closure of Congress, which is considered a crime. The demonstrations were marked by attacks on the Supreme Federal Court (STF), the president of the Chamber of Deputies, Rodrigo Maia (DEM-RJ), and the "Centrão" political bloc. Most of the protesters were dressed in green and yellow and carried Brazilian flags.

Commenting on the demonstrations in support of the government, Bolsonaro said: "Today is a day when people are taking to the streets. Not to defend a president, a politician, or anyone else. They are going to defend the future of this nation. It is a spontaneous demonstration. It has a clear agenda, respects the law and institutions, but its purpose is to send a message to those who insist on old practices and do not want to let the people be free." The statements were made during a service at the Atitude Church in the west of Rio de Janeiro.

== Results ==
On October 18, the Ministry of Education announced the full release of the education budget, allocating approximately R$1 billion to basic and higher education. Although the Ministry claimed that it had reversed its decision due to higher federal tax revenues, student organizations considered this a victory for the protests that had pressured the government to maintain the education budget.
