= Bostil =

Pejorative term for Brazil

"Bostil" is a pejorative term popularized by Brazilian social media users around 2020, originating from "Brasil" (Brazil) and the Portuguese word "bosta" ("shit"). The word is frequently associated with mockery or dissatisfaction with events in the country. The term is particularly associated with the expression "intankável o Bostil" (meaning "Brazil has become unbearable", especially in terms of living or working conditions). It is generally translated as "Brapzil" or "Crapzil", in English.

== Origin ==
The term originated on social media when users, around 2020, began spreading images and videos, spacing out the term. At the time, it was used to criticize the government of Jair Bolsonaro; however, the term began to be used in other situations of comedy or dissatisfaction, even extending to the subsequent presidency of Lula.

== In popular culture ==
On October 22, 2025, the artificial intelligence assistant Grok became the subject of discussion after the machine used the term to refer to corruption events in Brazil on its own profile on X (Twitter), leading to criticism towards the AI agent concerning its opinions.
