= 2019 Brazilian general strike =

General strike in Brazil in 2019

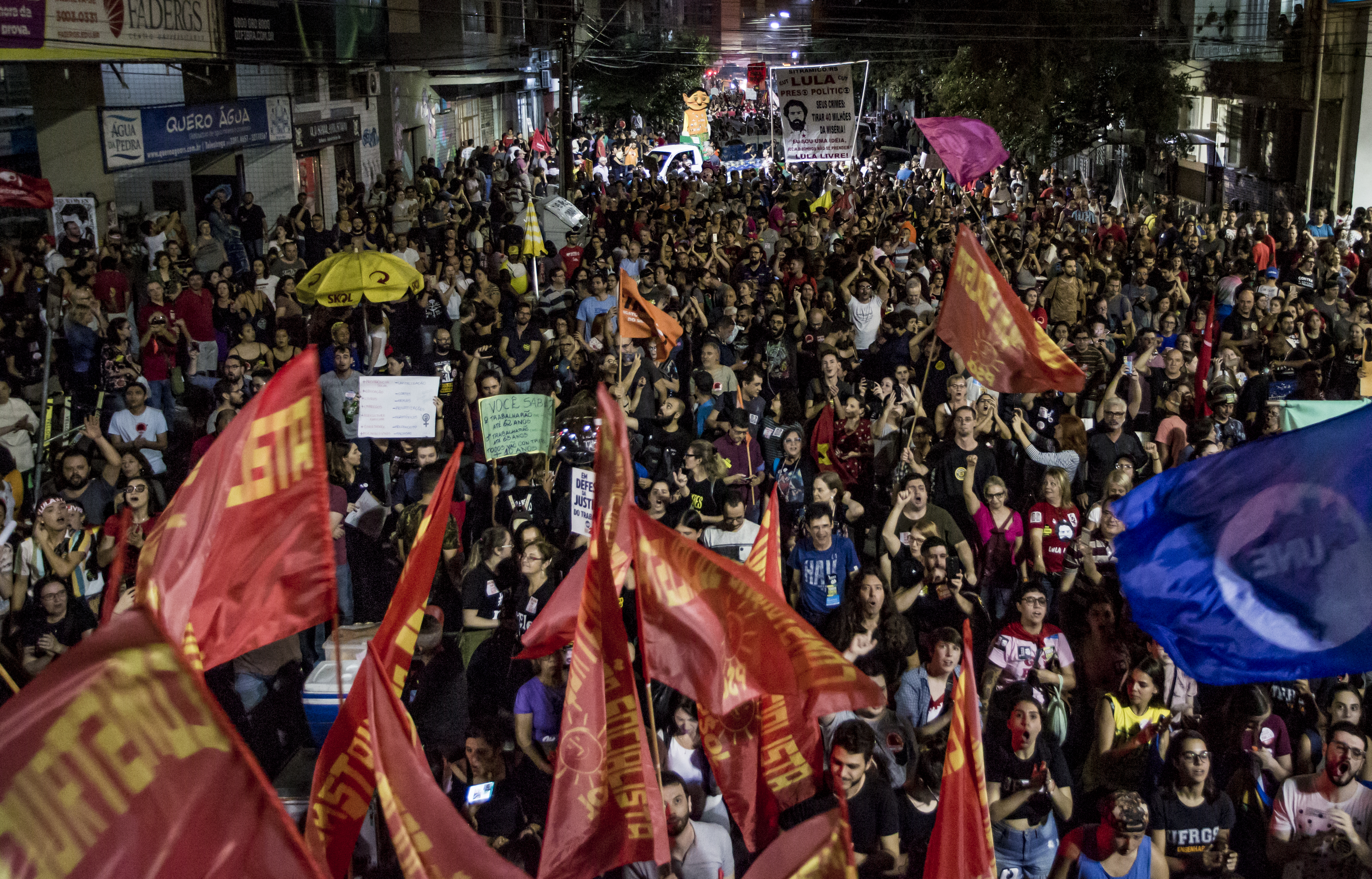
- Demonstration in Porto Alegre, Rio Grande do Sul, Brazil
- Native name: Greve geral de 2019
- English name: General Strike of 2019
- Date: June 14, 2019
- Location: Brazil — 26 states and Federal District
- Type: General strike
- Cause: Protest against pension reform, in defense of education, and for more jobs
- Participants: Truck drivers, metalworkers, chemical workers, teachers, federal, state, and municipal public servants, health professionals, port workers, subway workers, and bank employees

The 2019 Brazilian general strike took place on June 14, two years after the general strike of April 28, 2017. The movement was a protest against the pension reform of the Jair Bolsonaro administration and against cuts in education.

By 8 p.m. that day, 189 cities in 26 states and the Federal District had reported protests. Nineteen Brazilian state capitals had their bus systems affected, but considering other modes of transportation, the number of capitals affected reached 21.

== Background ==
The main Brazilian trade unions decided at a meeting at the headquarters of Força Sindical, in the Liberdade neighborhood of São Paulo, to call a general strike in Brazil against the pension reform proposals put forward by President Jair Bolsonaro and implemented by Finance Minister Paulo Guedes. The date set for the protests was June 14, 2019, and was considered the union's first response to Jair Bolsonaro's victory.

Together with Força Sindical, several unions joined forces, such as Central Única dos Trabalhadores (CUT), Central Geral dos Trabalhadores do Brasil (CGTB), Central dos Sindicatos Brasileiros (CSB), União Geral dos Trabalhadores (UGT), CSP-Conlutas, and Intersidical. Social movements such as a Frente Brasil Popular (FBP) e a Frente Povo sem Medo (FPSM) also called for demonstrations.

Left-wing parties, such as the Workers' Party (PT), Communist Party of Brazil (PCdoB), Workers' Cause Party (PCO), United Socialist Workers' Party (PSTU), and Brazilian Communist Party (PCB) supported and called on their party members to attend the demonstrations. In the Folha de S. Paulo newspaper, union leader Vagner Freitas, from CUT, used his column in the trends/debates section to call on activists to join the May 1 strike: "Men and women who are invisible to the government today will hail the date of the general strike that will bring Brazil to a halt to stop one of the most blatant and cruel attacks on the rights of the working class" wrote Freitas.

== Protests ==
In São Paulo, politicians such as Fernando Haddad, Gleisi Hoffmann, and Guilherme Boulos participated in the event organized in the São Paulo Museum of Art (MASP) space on Paulista Avenue. In Rio de Janeiro, the meeting point was at the Candelária Church, which, according to organizers, mobilized 100,000 people. In Rio, there were clashes between police and protesters.

In Curitiba, demonstrations took place in front of the Federal University of Paraná (UFPR) building. In Belo Horizonte, the city's subway line was shut down. In Salvador, São Luís, Natal, and Brasília, strikes occurred on municipal bus lines. On the day of the strike, six Porto Alegre Metroemployees were arrested for setting fire to the train tracks at Sapucaia do Sul Station in Porto Alegre. Also in the capital Porto Alegre, 50,000 protesters, according to organizers, began a march at Esquina Democrática and then walked through several streets in the city center before dispersing at Largo Zumbi dos Palmares.

According to a report in the Valor Econômico newspaper, 123 cities across the country experienced work stoppages during the strike. However, according to trade unions, 45 million workers in 300 cities joined the strike.

== Reactions ==
On social media, the event received extreme reactions, both favorable and unfavorable. Throughout the day, hashtags in support and opposition also led the most commented topics on Twitter (#AGreveFoiUmFiasco and #DemitaOGrevista — used by opponents; and #BrasilBarraReforma — used by supporters).

Opposition politicians released images of the strikes in the capitals and invited people to join the strike, while pro-government politicians raised their tone against the protesters and classified their actions as “terrorist acts.” Writer Rodrigo Constantino, in the newspaper Gazeta do Povo, described the strike as “just another failed act of vandalism by vagabonds.” João Paulo Rodrigues, from the National Coordination of the Landless Workers' Movement (MST), described the strike as “a great victory.”
