= Cry of the Excluded =

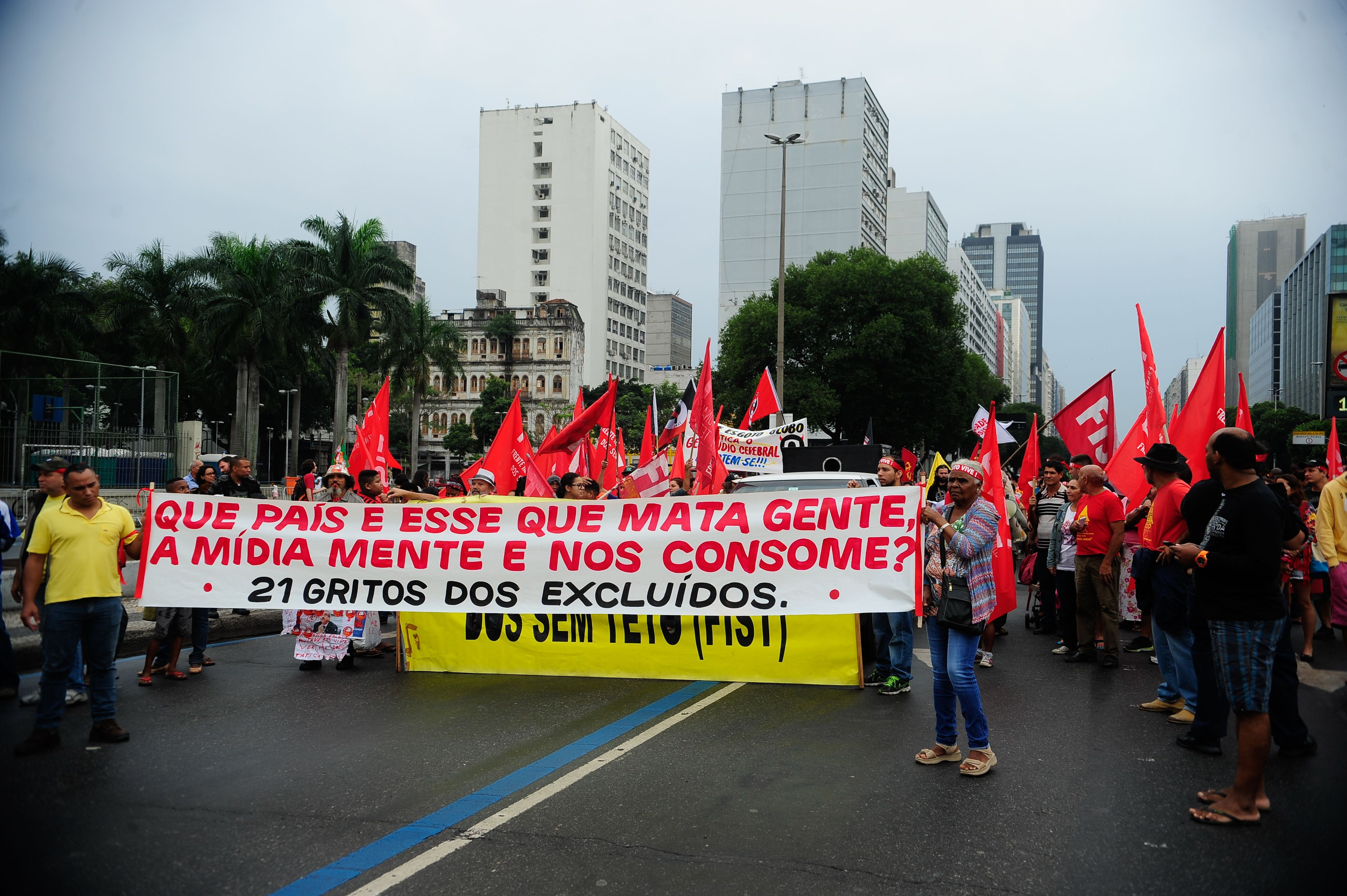
People attend the Grito dos Excluidos (Cry of the Excluded) as part of a demonstration during Brazilian Independence Day in Rio de Janeiro, Brazil. (Fernando Frazão/Agência Brasil)

The Cry of the Excluded (Portuguese: Grito dos Excluídos) is a number of popular demonstrations in Brazil held every year during the week of September 7, the Brazilian Independence Day, to ask for attention for the people that are excluded of all what makes life worth as a human being.

Started in 1995 as an initiative of the Roman Catholic bishops, since then it has settled down in more than 20 countries in the Americas and the Caribbean.

In Brazil, the events started has a different theme every year, with marches, demonstrations, seminars, classes, and talks take place in capital cities all over the country throughout the week.
