= Professora Bebel =

Brazilian teacher and politician

- Maria Izabel Azevedo Noronha
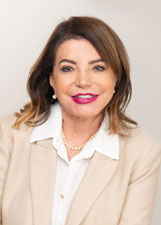

State deputy from São Paulo
- Incumbent
- Assumed office March 15, 2019

Personal details
- Born: May 1, 1960 (age 66) Piracicaba, São Paulo, Brazil
- Party: PT (1989–present)
- Education: Universidade Metodista de Piracicaba
- Occupation: Professor; Trade unionist
- Website: www.professorabebel.com.br

Maria Izabel Azevedo Noronha (May 1, 1960), better known as Professor Bebel, is a Brazilian teacher, union leader, and politician affiliated with the Workers' Party (PT). Since 2019, she has held the position of state deputy for the state of São Paulo.

== Biography ==
=== Early years and education ===
Maria Izabel was born on May 1, 1960, in the city of Piracicaba, in the interior of São Paulo. Bebel worked as a domestic worker during her youth to pay for her college education in Language and Literature at the Methodist University of Piracicaba (Unimep). She also earned a master's degree in Educational Administration from the same university.

=== Career ===
When she began working as a Portuguese language teacher in public schools in the state, she became active in teachers' unions. She was elected president of the Union of Teachers in Public Education in the State of São Paulo, the main union for teachers in the state, for the first time in 1999, returning to the position in 2008, 2011, 2014, and 2017, for a total of five terms.

During her tenure, she was a strong opponent of the Brazilian Social Democracy Party (PSDB), organizing strikes for wage increases in 2000 during the administration of Mário Covas and in 2013 for the opening of civil service examinations during the administration of Geraldo Alckmin. At a rally in 2010, Bebel said, “We are here to break the backbone of this party and this governor,” referring to then-Governor José Serra. She served on the National Education Council between 2004 and 2012, during Fernando Haddad's terms, under the presidencies of Luiz Inácio Lula da Silva and Dilma Rousseff.

A member of the Workers' Party (PT) since 1989, Bebel was elected state representative for São Paulo with 87,169 votes in the 2018 elections. In 2022, she was re-elected to office after obtaining 155,983 votes. In 2024, she ran for mayor of Piracicaba. She finished the race in fourth place, failing to advance to the second round, with 6% of the votes.

==== Electoral history ====
Year	Position	Votes	Party	Result	Ref.
2018	State deputy of São Paulo	87.169	PT	Elected	
2022	State deputy of São Paulo	155.983	PT	Elected	
2024	Mayor of Piracicaba	12.979	PT	Not elected	
