= Presidency of Jair Bolsonaro =

2019–2023 Brazilian presidential administration

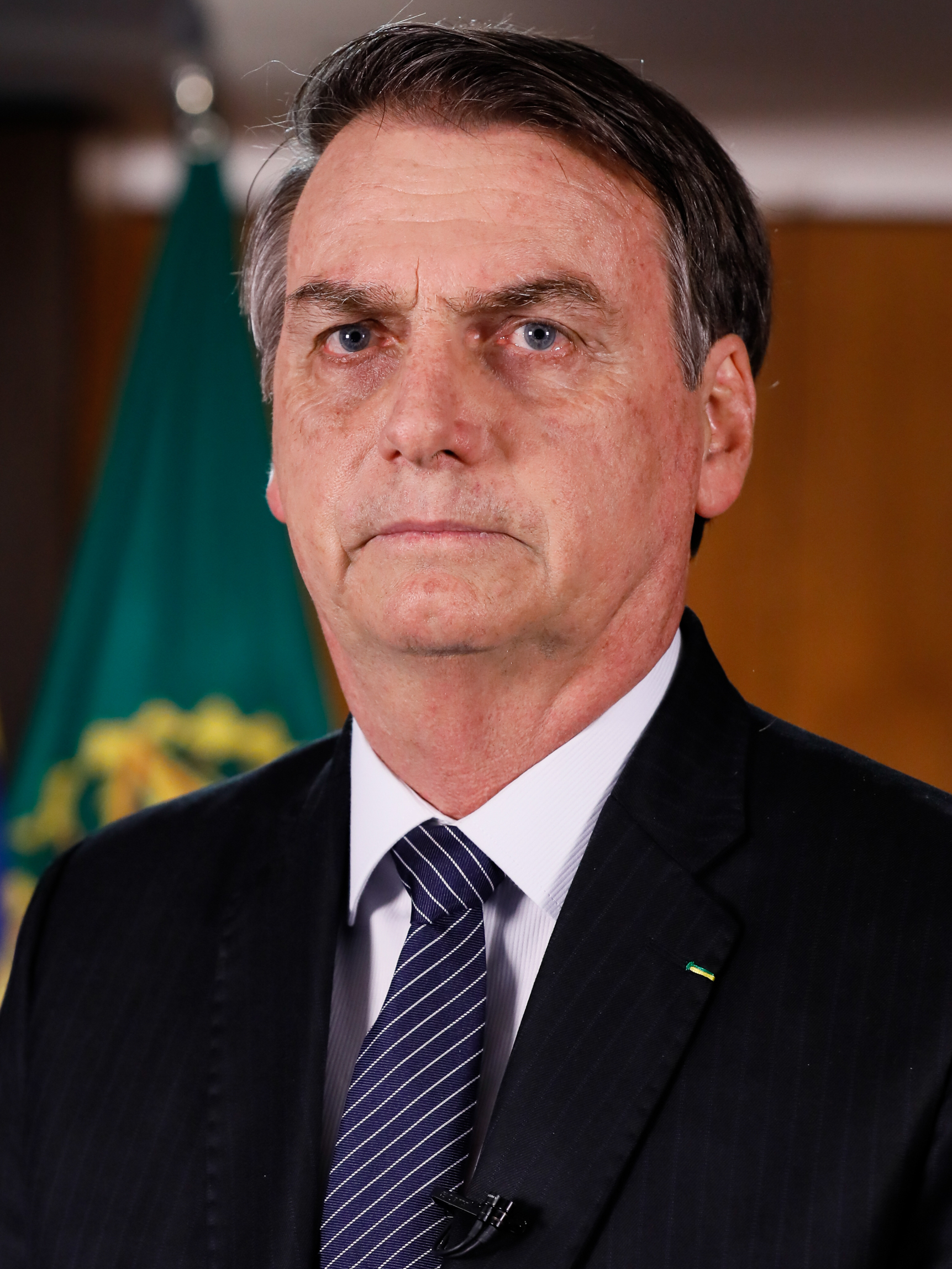
- Bolsonaro in 2019
- Presidency of Jair Bolsonaro; 1 January 2019 – 1 January 2023
- Vice President: Hamilton Mourão
- Cabinet: See list
- Party: Liberal
- Election: 2018
- Seat: Palácio da Alvorada

Jair Bolsonaro's tenure as the 38th president of Brazil began with his inauguration on 1 January 2019, and ended on 1 January 2023. Bolsonaro took office following his victory in the 2018 general election, defeating Fernando Haddad. His presidency ended after one term in office, following his defeat in the 2022 general election to Luiz Inácio Lula da Silva. In the years Brazil has been a democracy since 1985, Bolsonaro became the first president to lose an election as an incumbent.

His government was characterized by the strong presence of ministers with a military background, international alignment with the populist right and autocratic leaders, and was recognized for his anti-environmental, anti-indigenous people and pro gun policies. He was also responsible for a broad dismantling of cultural, scientific and educational government programmes, in addition to promoting repeated attacks on democratic institutions and spreading fake news. His government was responsible for a significant reduction in bureaucracy and modernization of public systems, with the fast-paced digitization of federal public services, through the creation of the digital platform "gov.br". Bolsonaro also sanctioned the Economic Freedom Act, reducing bureaucracy in economic activities and facilitating the opening and operation of businesses throughout the country, which proved very beneficial, especially for small companies.

During his administration crime dropped across the country and unemployment rates slowly fell, with the Brazilian GDP showing a moderate growth rate, averaging 1.5% per year. At the same time, job insecurity, (Note: Attributed to multiple sources:) inflation and hunger increased, while per capita income, social inequality and poverty reached its worst levels since 2012.

== Background ==
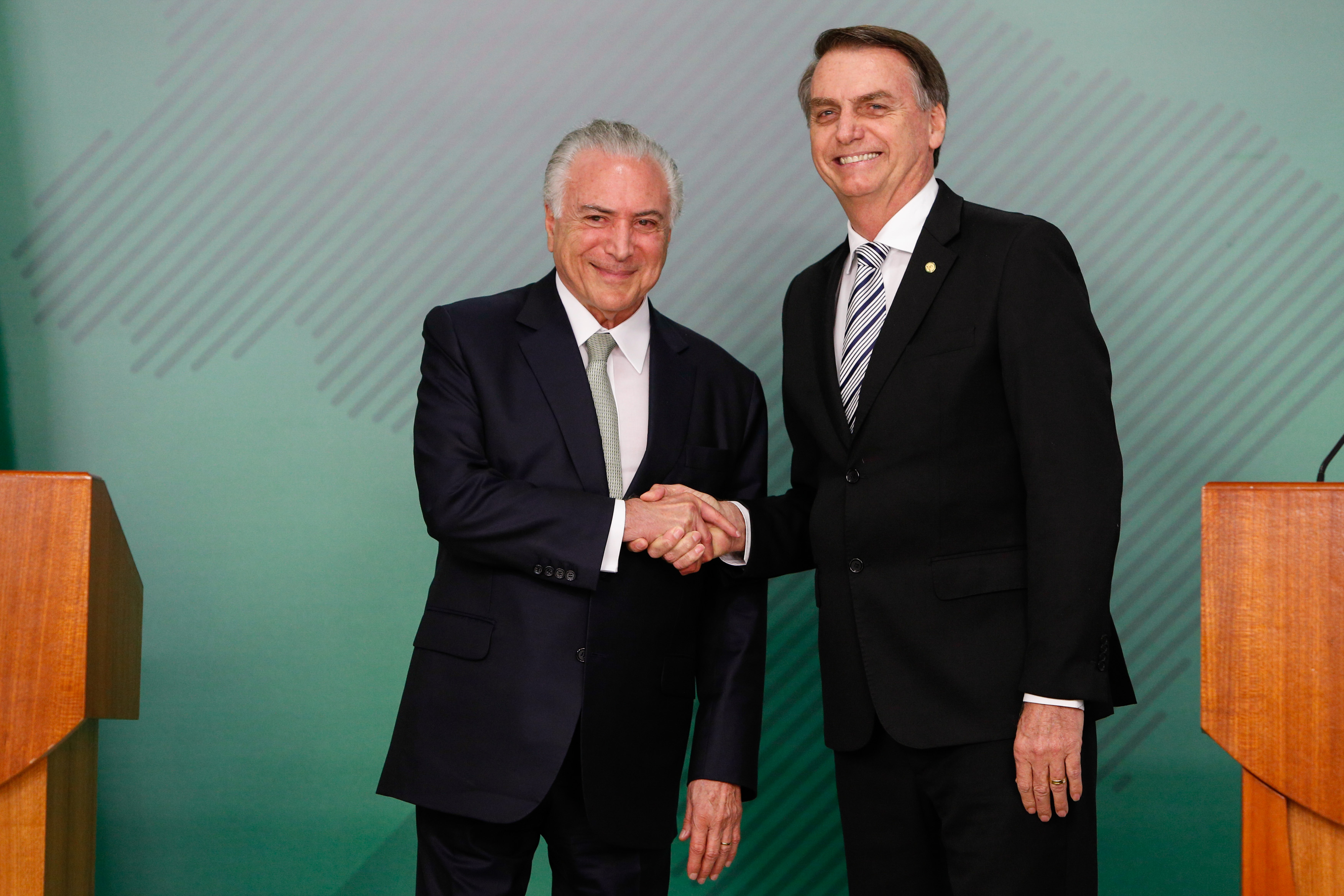
President-elect Bolsonaro meets president Michel Temer

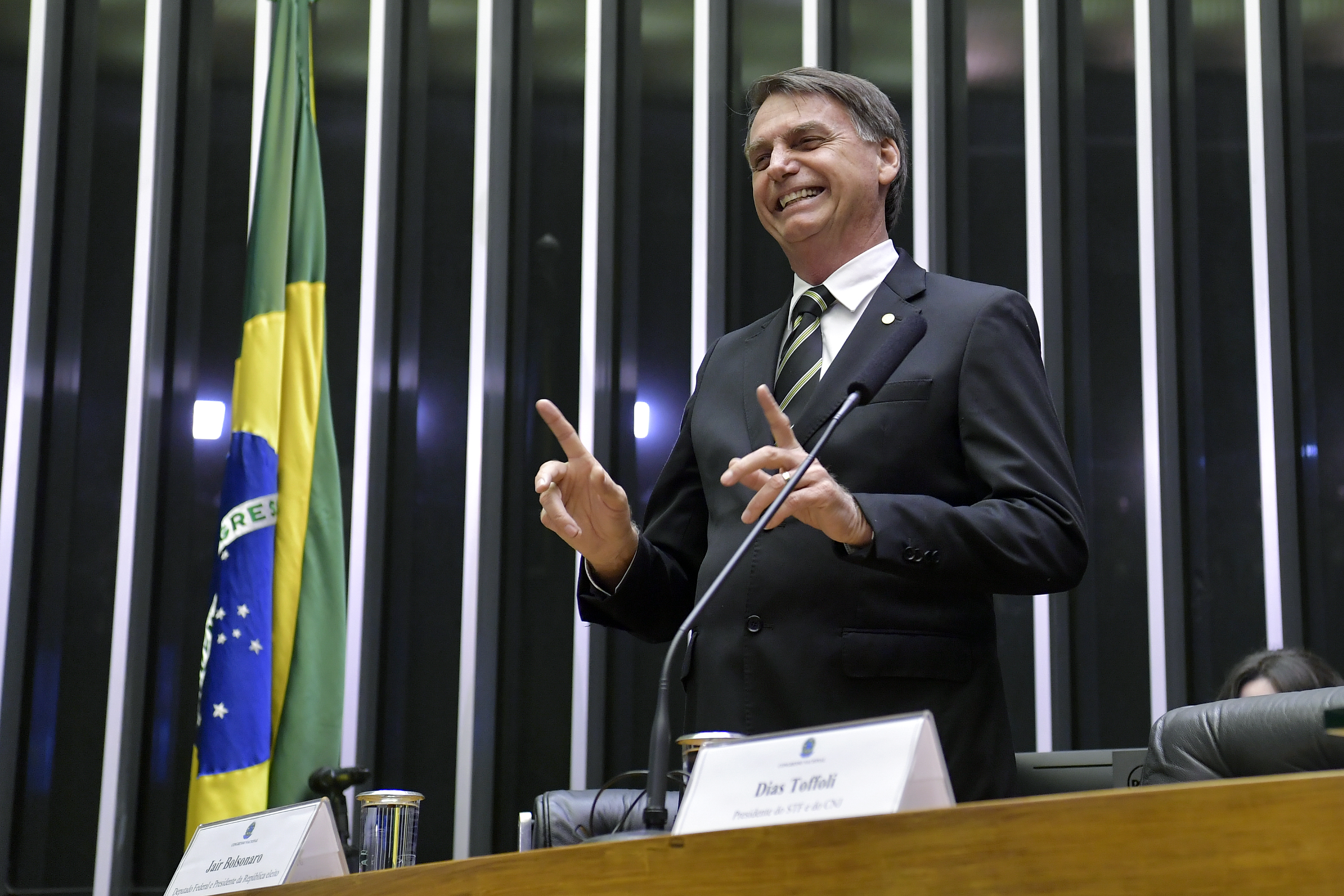
President-elect Bolsonaro attending the congressional celebration of the 30th anniversary of the Constitution in 2018

Bolsonaro, at the time of his election, was a 27-year member of Congress; his victory has been credited to voter anger at the political class over years of corruption in politics, economic recession, and a surge in violent crime. According to sociologist Clara Araújo, "the dissatisfaction over the economic crisis, it seems to me, was channeled along with a discourse about conservative morals". The economy of Brazil was recovering from crisis, with an unemployment rate of 12 percent at the time of the election, double that of five years prior. The crisis was caused by, among other factors, weak commodity prices; events revealed underlying weaknesses in the economy, which include poor infrastructure, excessive bureaucracy, an inefficient tax system, and corruption.

== Cabinet and appointments ==
On 11 October 2018, days before his election victory, Bolsonaro had already announced DEM congressman Onyx Lorenzoni as the future chief of staff in his cabinet. On 31 October, president-elect Bolsonaro announced astronaut Marcos Pontes as the future Minister of Science and Technology; as of that date, he had already confirmed two other ministerial nominations: Paulo Guedes as Economy minister, and Augusto Heleno as defence minister. However, on 7 November, Augusto Heleno was appointed to the Institutional Security Office of Brazil. On the first day of November, Bolsonaro confirmed that anti-graft judge Sergio Moro had accepted his invitation to serve as Justice minister. The decision drew backlash from the international press because Moro had convicted Luiz Inácio Lula da Silva, Bolsonaro's chief political rival in the election, for money laundering and corruption.

On 11 November 2018, O Estado de S. Paulo released a story stating that Bolsonaro's team has chosen World Bank director and former finance minister Joaquim Levy to head the Brazilian Development Bank (BNDES). A report was later issued by Folha de S. Paulo that Bolsonaro has yet to confirm the nomination of Levy to the post. A press release from Paulo Guedes's team, released the next day, confirmed Levy's appointment. On 15 November 2018, economist Roberto Campos Neto was named as the future Central Bank governor.

In December 2018 the final composition had emerged after weeks of announcements and appointments. The cabinet would include 22 personnel, of which 16 are ministers, two are cabinet-level positions and four are secretaries directly linked to the presidency. The 22 figure is down from 29 in the outgoing administration. Seven of the ministers will be military men, eight have technocrat profiles, and seven are politicians. Hindustan Times commented that "there are just two women in Bolsonaro’s government, which is double the number in the outgoing lineup under President Michel Temer", and that "there are no blacks, despite half of Brazil’s population being at least partly descended from Africans".

On 7 November 2019, Roberto Alvim was nominated Special Secretary for Culture under the auspices of the Ministry of Tourism, only to be fired on 17 January 2020 after appearing to quote a speech by German Nazi politician Joseph Goebbels in a government-sanctioned video.

On 18 June 2020, Minister of Education Abraham Weintraub resigned.

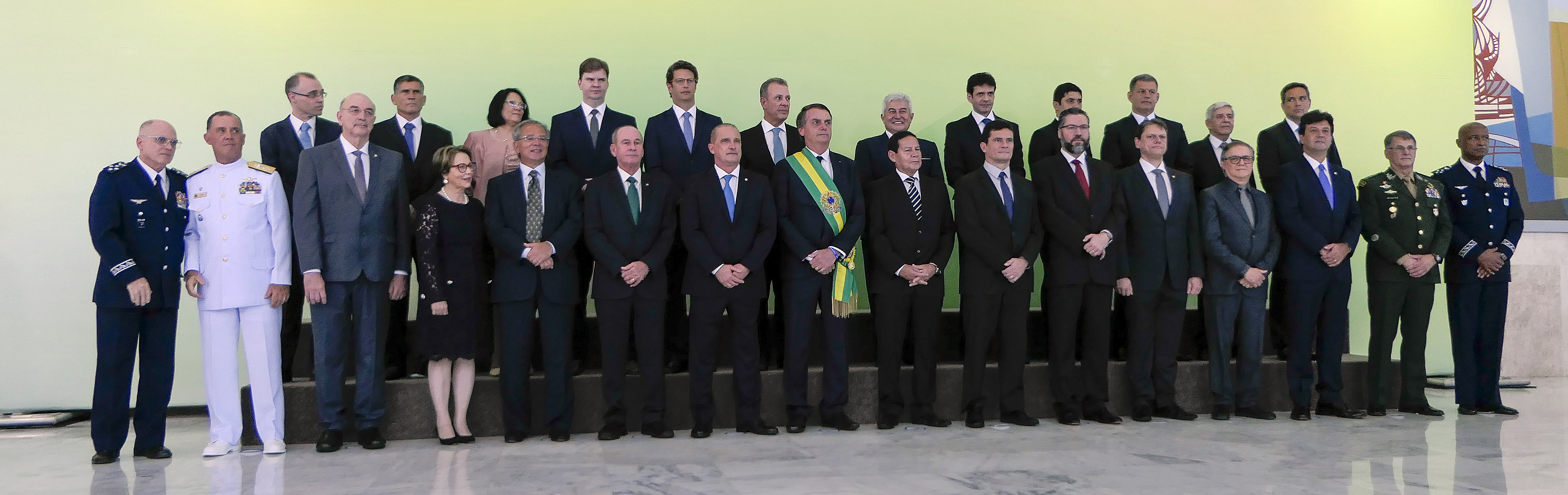
The Bolsonaro cabinet on Inauguration Day, 1 January 2019

== Domestic policy ==
Logo of the Bolsonaro administration. "Beloved homeland, Brazil"

In one of his first actions as president, Bolsonaro increased the minimum wage from R$954 to R$998. Within days of assuming office, Bolsonaro transferred land reform duties from the National Indigenous Foundation (FUNAI) to the Ministry of Agriculture. Most of the remaining duties previously assigned to FUNAI are now part of the Ministry of Women, Family and Human Rights.

=== Economy ===
Bolsonaro spent the first months of his administration trying to pass legislation and enact reforms with the stated goal of creating more economic freedom and growth for Brazil. The federal government cut taxes for some specific sectors of the economy and removed import tariffs for several areas, such as capital goods, and IT or telecommunication products which were necessary for technological evolution and increased production in the medical, industrial, and agricultural sectors. Bolsonaro also removed the import tariffs of sailing ships, jet skis and other luxury items. The government also passed a controversial pension reform, along with making other changes across the economy. The government also tried to pass economic reforms such as the Plano Mais Brasil, which enveloped around resource decentralization combined with greater fiscal responsibility in Brazil's management, reduction of taxes for productive sectors of the economy, reduction of direct state investments in the economy, and the debureaucratization of the state, while increasing funding for anti-poverty programmes. Some of those proposals were able to pass in Congress, though others were stopped in different committees. Overall, though the economy did grow, poverty and inequality expanded under Bolsonaro.

According to the economist Guilherme Delgado, the proposed measures made by Bolsonaro disorganized the public service, stifled investments, privileged the rich, weakened democratic rights and deepened economic and social inequalities.

The result of Bolsonaro's economic reforms were mixed. Overall, prior to the COVID-19 recession, the Brazilian economy was recovering and growing, though at a slower pace than predicted by the government. In 2021, Brazil broke a record with more than 4 million companies being opened by the private sector, of which 1,4 million end up closing, an increase of 34.6% when compared to 2020. Talking about most of the reforms enacted by Bolsonaro, according to the Interunion Department of Statistics and Socioeconomic Studies, "the final objective [of the reforms] was to reduce the size of the State, not so that it could become more agile, but so that the private sector could profit from activities that were previously done by the government".

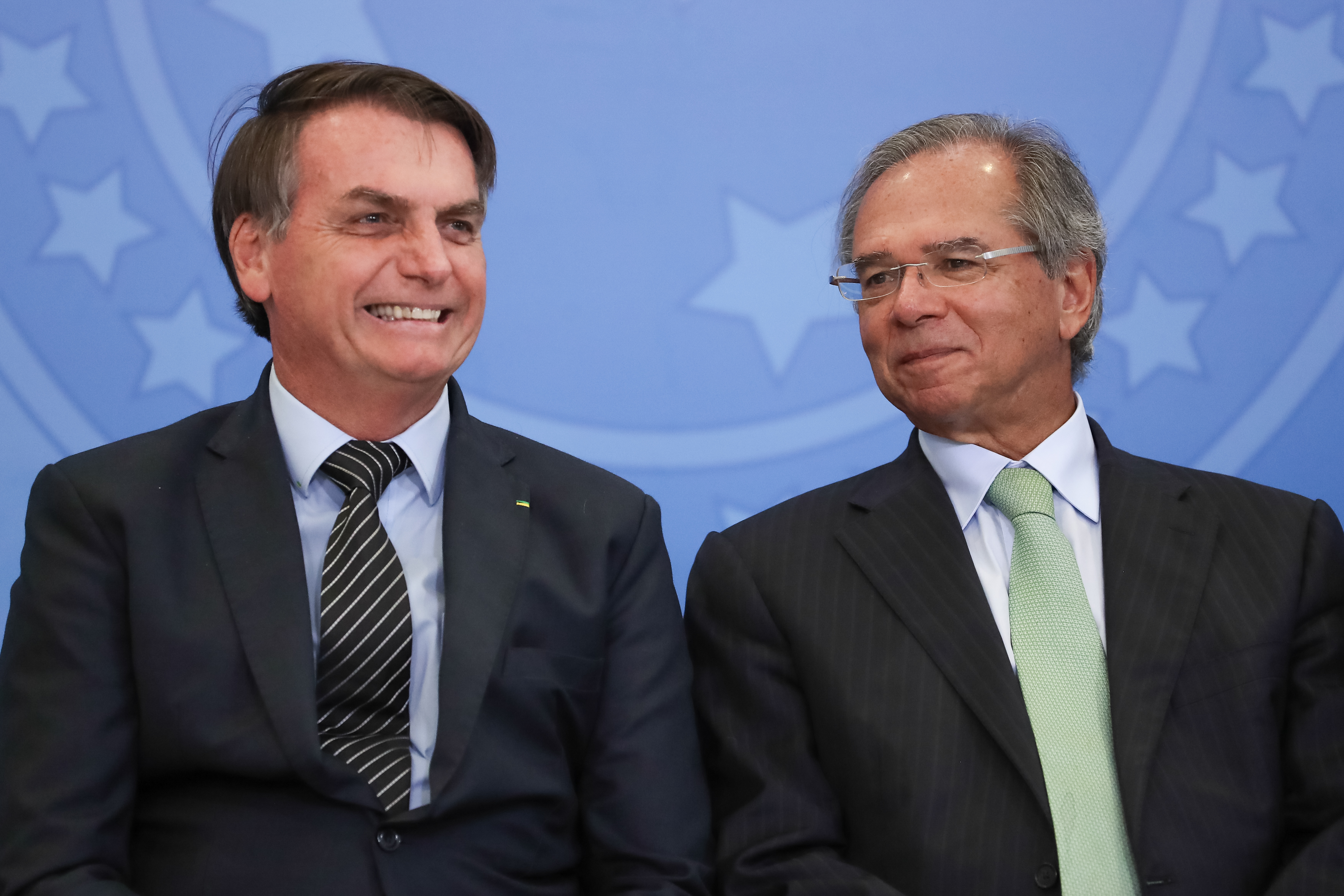
Bolsonaro and his Minister of Economics, Paulo Guedes.

The Bolsonaro administration left Brazil with a public debt of $5,87 trillion reais (or US$1.12 trillion). Bolsonaro ended his term leaving the largest federal debt in the history of the country. Bolsonaro was also the first Brazilian president since the Plano Real, in the mid-90s, to end his term with a real minimum wage worth less than when taking office.

=== Energy ===
The main characteristic of the Brazilian energy matrix is that it is much more renewable than most other countries. While in 2019 the world matrix was only 14% made up of renewable energy, Brazil's was at 45%. Petroleum and oil products made up 34.3% of the matrix; sugar cane derivatives, 18%; hydraulic energy, 12.4%; natural gas, 12.2%; firewood and charcoal, 8.8%; varied renewable energies, 7%; mineral coal, 5.3%; nuclear, 1.4%, and other non-renewable energies, 0.6%. In the electric energy matrix, the difference between Brazil and the world is even greater: while the world only had 25% of renewable electric energy in 2019, Brazil had 83%. The Brazilian electric matrix is composed of: hydraulic energy, 64.9%; biomass, 8.4%; wind energy, 8.6%; solar energy, 1%; natural gas, 9.3%; oil products, 2%; nuclear, 2.5%; coal and derivatives, 3.3%.

During Bolsonaro's presidency, the installation of wind energy and solar energy reached its highest level throughout history. As of February 2021, according to ONS, total installed capacity of wind energy was 19.1 GW, with average capacity factor of 30%. In 2020 Brazil was the 8th country in the world in terms of installed wind power (17.2 GW). As of April 2021, according to ONS, total installed capacity of photovoltaic solar was 8.9 GW, with average capacity factor of 24%. In 2020, Brazil was the 14th country in the world in terms of installed solar power (7.8 GW).

Bolsonaro is against any kind of taxation on solar energy. In 2020, the government zeroed the tax on solar energy import of solar energy equipment.

=== Infrastructure ===
One of the main objectives of the Bolsonaro Government was to try to complete the execution of more than 14,000 works promised by previous governments, which were never completed until that point, or even having started. According to calculations, the execution and completion of works that have already started would cost something around R$144 billion. Some of the most important road works carried out in Bolsonaro's term include: completion of the duplication of the BR-116 in Rio Grande do Sul, of the BR-101 in the Northeast, of BR-116 in Bahia, of BR-364 between Cuiabá and Rondonópolis, duplication of the BR-470 in Santa Catarina, from BR-280 in Santa Catarina, of the BR-381 in Minas Gerais, construction of the International Integration Bridge (linking Foz do Iguaçu to presidente Franco, in Paraguay), bidding for construction of a bridge that will connect Porto Murtinho (MS) to Carmelo Peralta (Paraguay) for the realization of the Bioceanic Corridor, completion of asphalting of BR-163 in Pará, inauguration of the Abunã Bridge connecting Rondônia to Acre, paving of BRs in the Northeast such as BR-222 and the BR-235, in addition to being programmed new concessions for the main motorway of Paraná and Rodovia Presidente Dutra, among others. During Bolsonaro's government, there was also a greater focus on the construction of railways, with the government inaugurating a stretch of the North-South Railway, between Goiás and São Paulo, start of construction of the Railroad of East-West Integration in Bahia, in addition to planning the construction of Ferrogrão, between Mato Grosso and Pará, among others.

=== Response to COVID-19 pandemic ===
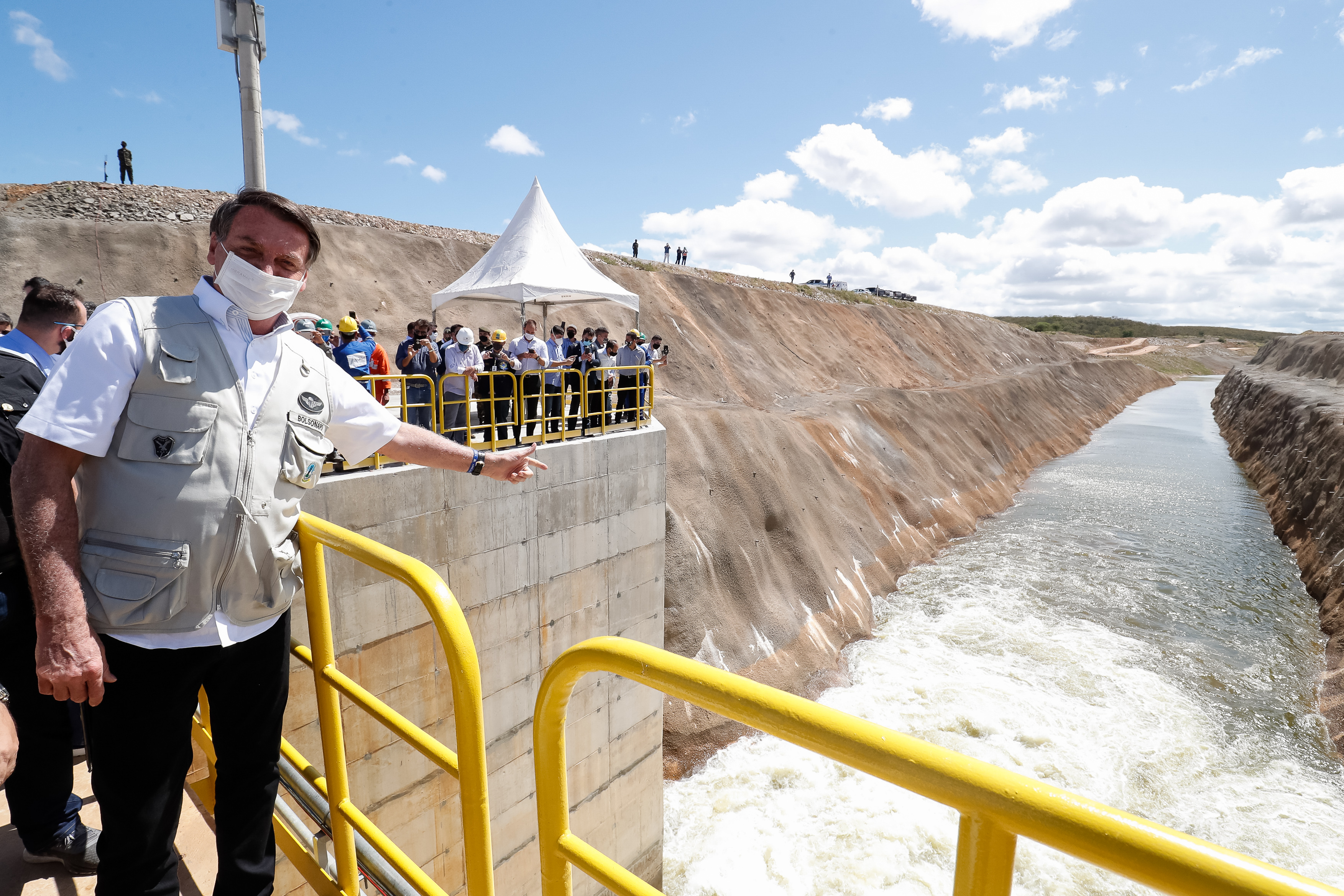
Bolsonaro in a construction site on the bank of the São Francisco River in the state of Ceará, in June 2020.

Throughout the COVID-19 pandemic in Brazil, Bolsonaro and his administration have been accused of downplaying the crisis while the number of Brazilians infected by the virus climbed exponentially by mid-2020. Bolsonaro claimed that COVID-19 is no deadlier than the "common flu" and that his priority was the nation's economic recovery rather than the health crisis. He criticized the governor of Rio de Janeiro for suspending flights from other states with confirmed cases, claiming that Rio de Janeiro was behaving like its own country and that taking precautions such as closing businesses to limit the spread was hurting the economy.

In March 2020, there were demonstrations throughout the country calling for Bolsonaro's resignation due to his government's handling of the virus. According to independent polls taken at the time: 44% of Brazilians considered Bolsonaro's government "bad", 33% thought it ordinary, and 26% thought it excellent. In the same poll, 64% of Brazilians disapproved of Bolsonaro's handling of the virus, and 44.8% favoured his resignation.

As cases in the country rose, Bolsonaro claimed that "Brazilians never catch anything", and as an example said that a Brazilian man can jump into sewage and nothing will happen to him. He continually accused political opponents and the press of exaggerating the threat of the virus and called it a "fantasy" created by the media. He has been criticised by João Doria, the governor of São Paulo, for not acting on the crisis at a federal level, instead leaving the responsibility of placing measures to tackle the virus to the individual states.

On 7 July 2020, Bolsonaro said that he had tested positive for COVID-19. On 25 July, he announced that he had tested negative for COVID-19 in a fourth test since being diagnosed, but the next week he indicated that he had also started suffering from "mold in the lung". Even so, he stated his opposition to mandatory vaccination.

In August 2020, in the middle of the pandemic, Bolsonaro's approval rating showed signs of recovery, reaching its highest level since his inauguration. In November 2020, he said he would not take a COVID vaccine if it became available; he supported the efficacy of any possible vaccine if the Brazilian Health Agency deemed it safe. In the same broadcast, he called face masks "the last taboo to fall".

On 17 December 2020, Bolsonaro made comments in jest at a political event in Porto Seguro, Bahia that people taking the Pfizer–BioNTech COVID-19 vaccine might get side-effects including transforming into crocodiles, becoming superhuman, turning into bearded ladies, and developing effeminate voices.

In early 2021, Bolsonaro's approval ratings fell again, mostly due to the government's response to the COVID-19 pandemic, vaccination controversies, and the concurrent economic crisis that evolved under his watch. Days after Brazil surpassed Russia as the country worst hit by COVID, Bolsonaro held a political rally in Brasília; while surrounded by supporters and his own security guards, who were wearing masks, he did not. In February, Supreme Court Justice Rosa Weber charged Bolsonaro with putting the Brazilian people at risk for spreading misinformation by encouraging the use of hydroxychloroquine as a valid treatment for COVID-19. In March, as the nation saw a surge in deaths, Bolsonaro criticized the measures to curb the virus and told the public to "stop whining".

In June 2021, protests erupted all over Brazil against Bolsonaro's response to the pandemic; in São Paulo alone there were estimated to be 100,000 protesters on the streets. In July, YouTube removed videos posted by Bolsonaro for spreading false information about the virus. YouTube has reportedly removed 15 videos altogether; one that was removed had shown that Brazil's former health minister, Eduardo Pazuello, comparing the virus to HIV. In other videos, Bolsonaro criticised efforts to stop the spread of the virus, such as wearing masks or taking the vaccine.

By the end of June 2021, more members of Bolsonaro's opposition called for his impeachment for his handling and spreading of misinformation during the pandemic. The opposition signed a document with multiple accusations, such as blaming Bolsonaro for the deaths of 500,000 Brazilians from COVID-19, stating that his government had blatantly turned down expert advice on tackling the virus, and more than 20 others.

In July 2021, Bolsonaro claimed on Brazilian radio that his government's greatest achievement was "two and a half years without corruption". In the same month, a scandal dubbed "vaccine-gate" had washed over the country. After months of denying offers of vaccines and bartering the costs, Bolsonaro's government made a deal to buy the unapproved Covaxin vaccine from the Indian company Bharat Biotech at a very high price. It was found that the government allegedly paid ten times the amount agreed by Bharat Biotech for the vaccine and that the irregularities were not found in the prices of the vaccines, but in a payment of $45 million to a company in Singapore. in response, the Brazilian Supreme Court authorised a criminal investigation of Bolsonaro. He has denied the allegations, calling the investigation "an embarrassment" and saying "I'm incorruptible". Bharat Biotech claimed innocence with regard to the deal.

=== Agriculture ===
In 2019, a trade agreement was announced between Mercosur and European Union, which provides, among other matters, for the elimination of tariffs for various products, such as fruit, orange juice, instant coffee, fish, crustaceans, vegetable oils, and quotas for the sale of meat, sugar and ethanol. For example, an increase in the export of fruits from the Brazilian Northeast to Europe was expected. However, since then, France, which is a competitor of Brazil in the sale of commodities and which depends on the protectionism of the European Union to sell its products, has purposely and unilaterally blocked the execution of the agreement, through massive demands, a common tactic in international negotiations to prevent actions.

Nevertheless, during Bolsonaro's tenure, the country's agriculture broke successive production records. It is estimated that the national grain harvest will break the 3rd consecutive record in 2021, with a production of 260.5 million tons (2.5% increase compared to the previous year, when production was 254.1 million tons). In terms of gross value, in 2020, the country's agricultural production increased by 17% compared to the previous year, reaching R$871.3 billion.

=== Crime ===
Official rates of violence in the country have been falling as a result of toughening laws, increasing police powers and implementing anti-violence programmes. In the first 11 months of the first year of government, the murder rate fell 22.3%, attempted murder fell 9.5%, personal injury followed by death 3.5% and rape cases fell 10.9%. All other robbery and theft rates fell above 20% on average.

=== Gun policy ===
Bolsonaro issued a decree to facilitate gun ownership in Brazil on 15 January 2019. The decree, signed by Bolsonaro in an event at Planalto Palace, extends valid ownership period from five to ten years and allows citizens to own up to four firearms. The decree loosens restrictions for gun possession but does not affect those for gun carry. In order to own a firearm, a citizen will have to provide proof of the "existence of a safe or a secure location for storage" of the weapon at home. Requirements for possession such as passing training courses and background checks remain, as does the minimum age requirement of 25 years.

=== Education ===
The Bolsonaro Government took office in 2019 under the country's poor result in the 2018 PISA exam: among 79 countries analysed, the country ranked 59th in reading, 71st in mathematics and 67th in science, a performance below the OECD average and one of the worst in South America. The Minister of Education, Abraham Weintraub, criticized the situation of the education that the Government had just been given to administer, stating that "Brazil's poor PISA result is entirely the PT's fault". In the 1st year of Bolsonaro's mandate, the MEC had already initiated measures to try to reverse the situation: a National Programme of Civic-Military Schools, Full-time Secondary and Elementary Education, opening of more places, use of the internet to improve education and greater use of universities.

The Bolsonaro government also inherited a terrible position from Brazil in the ranking of the best universities in the world. At the end of 2018, the best Brazilian university was not even in 250th place, and after that, all were in positions below 400th place. By the end of 2020, even with educational institutions closed due to the COVID-19 pandemic, Brazil had slightly improved in the ranking: University of São Paulo (USP) and State University of Campinas (Unicamp) had risen in rank and six national institutions had entered the ranking.

In May 2019, the government cut 30% of the education budget for three universities due to alleged issues with partisan activities. Bolsonaro has supported the Escola sem Partido (ESP), which encourages students to film teachers to collect evidence for its allegation that the education system is dominated by progressive parties. Student protests were reported across the country.

=== Environment ===
Home to much of the Amazon rainforest—the world's largest—Brazil's tropical primary (old-growth) forest loss rate exceeds that of other countries.

Cumulatively, 20% of the Amazon rainforest has been "transformed" (deforested) and another 6% has been "highly degraded", with Brazil having the highest percentage deforested or highly degraded of any Amazonia nation.

The deforestation rate in Brazil surged by 72% during Bolsonaro's time in office, reflecting that Amazon development was his key policy position.

According to a report by the National Institute for Space Research the deforestation of the rainforests in Brazil more than doubled during Bolsonaro's presidency. Bolsonaro called the publication a lie and fired the institute's director, Ricardo Galvão.

In June 2019, German chancellor Angela Merkel said she was concerned about deforestation in the Amazon rainforest and would seek "straight talk" with Bolsonaro on the upcoming G20 summit in Osaka. She also said that the situation "does not affect the imminent free trade agreement between Mercosur and the EU". After French president Emmanuel Macron conditioned France's support for a trade accord between the European Union and Mercosul to Brazil remaining in the Paris Agreement, Bolsonaro said, at the meeting of the G20 in Osaka, that Brazil "will not leave the Paris Agreement", also inviting Macron to visit Brazil's Amazon region.

In August 2019, Bolsonaro accused Macron of having "a misplaced colonialist mentality in the 21st century" in reference to criticism by the French president, when he called on G7 leaders to discuss the Amazon crisis. He later tweeted "I regret that the President Macron seeks to exploit an internal issue in Brazil and other Amazonian countries for personal political gains". He added that "the Brazilian government remains open to dialogue, based on objective data and mutual respect". Macron stated he will refuse to ratify the European Union–Mercosur Free Trade Agreement unless Brazil commits to protecting the environment. Bolsonaro's Facebook comments mocking Brigitte Macron's looks escalated the diplomatic clash, which was dubbed "the worst diplomatic crisis between France and Brazil in 40 years".

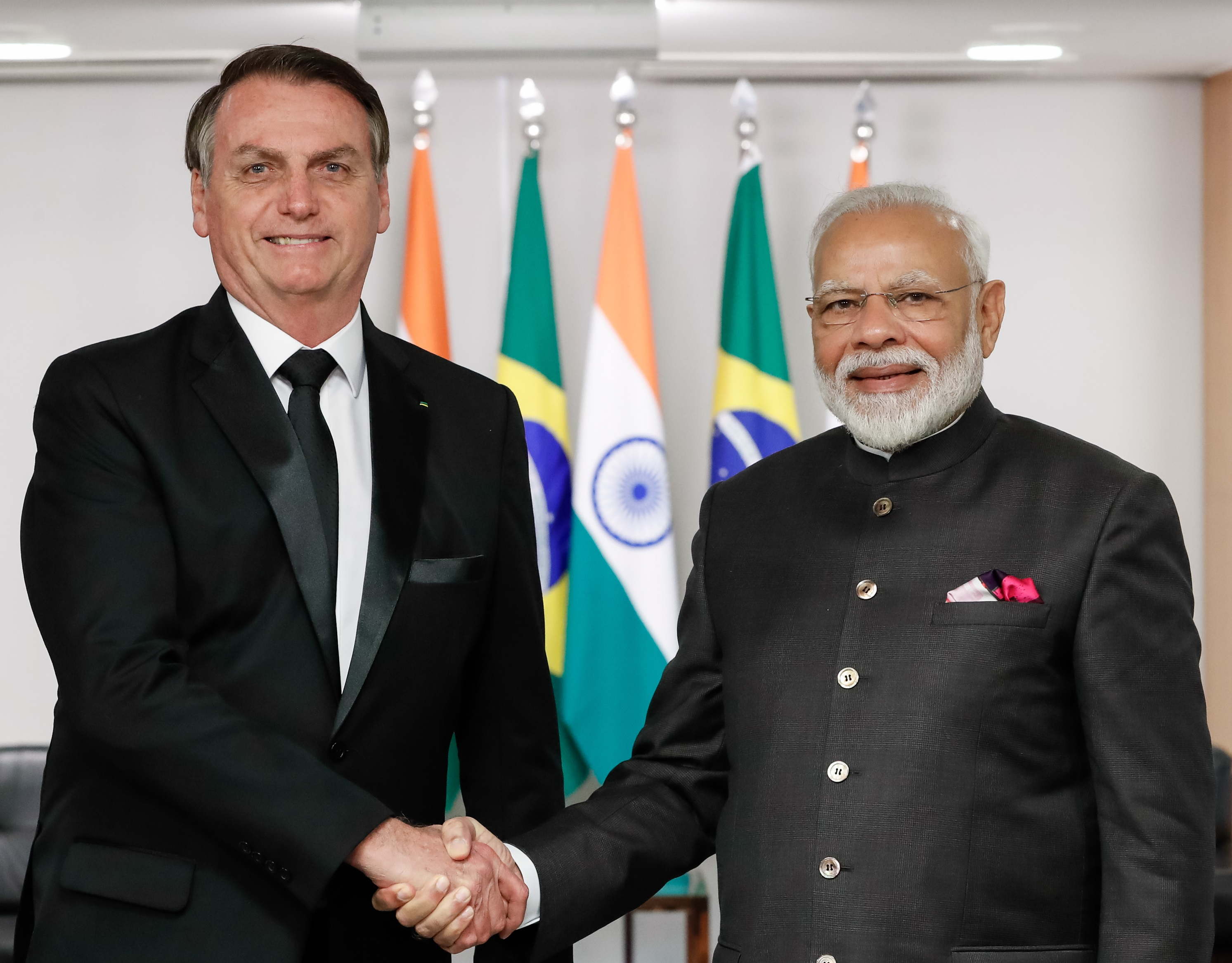
Bolsonaro with Indian prime minister Narendra Modi, Brasília, November 2019

During a conversation with journalists in July 2019, Bolsonaro lashed out at European leaders, saying that the Amazon belongs to Brazil and European countries can mind their own business because they have already "destroyed their environment". He also said: "We preserve more [rainforest] than anyone. No country in the world has the moral right to talk about Amazon".

During the 2019 Brazil wildfires, Bolsonaro accused (without providing any evidence) non-governmental organizations of starting the forest fires, due to a reduction of government funding to the NGOs. Environmental and climate experts described Bolsonaro's accusation as a "smokescreen" to hide his own government's rolling back of protections for the Amazon. They instead attributed the fires to farmers clearing land.

In 2020 the government of Brazil pledged to reduce its annual greenhouse gas emissions by 43% by 2030. It also set a target of reaching carbon neutrality by 2060 if it receives 10 billion dollars per year as help from the international community.

On 15 April 2021, in a letter to U.S. president Joe Biden, Bolsonaro said that Brazil is committed to ending illegal deforestation in the Amazon by 2030 and stated "the need of an adequate financial support from the international community, compatible with the magnitude and urgency of the challenges to be faced". According to TV host and entrepreneur Luciano Huck, outreach from the Biden administration "opens a door for Brazil to correct its current course of climate denialism". In April 2021, nearly 200 Brazilian organizations published an open letter warning US lawmakers against making deals with Bolsonaro's administration unless it reverses its anti-environmental agenda. According to Mother Jones, deforestation in the Amazon reached a 12-year high during Bolsonaro's administration and he has dismantled environmental policies, removed resources from enforcement agencies, and reduced environmental regulations. During the Leaders Summit on Climate, Bolsonaro pledged Brazil would go carbon-neutral by 2050, ten years earlier than previously pledged.

In November 2021, Bolsonaro promised to end and reverse deforestation of the Amazon rainforest by 2030, in the COP26 climate summit's first major agreement.

Following the disappearance of Brazilian indigenous expert Bruno Pereira and British journalist Dom Phillips in June 2022 while on a trip to report the remote Brazilian Amazon region of Javari Valley and to interview indigenous people who were patrolling the area against illegal miners and fishers, Bolsonaro downplayed the pair's disappearance, calling the trip an "unrecommended adventure" they should not have taken. The United Nations Human Rights Committee said the Brazilian government response to Bruno Pereira and Dom Phillips disappearance and subsequent murder was 'extremely slow' and highlighted both the indigenous expert and the journalist works as raising awareness, monitoring and reporting illegal activities in the Javari Valley region, which is the second biggest indigenous territory in Brazil and is believed to have one of the world's highest concentrations of uncontacted indigenous tribes.

His damage to the Amazon has widely been described by indigenous groups, human rights groups, politicians, academics and journalists as an ecocide and a genocide. Indigenous chiefs and human rights organizations have submitted an Article 15 communication to the International Criminal Court for crimes against humanity and genocide for harm to Indigenous people and destruction of the Amazon. Another has been submitted for ecocide by indigenous chiefs.

=== Defence ===
In October 2019, Bolsonaro said that Brazil has stopped taking care of its military and needs to rearm. He also said that "Brazil needs new armaments", and that "nobody wants an extremely bellicose Brazil", but that the country "needs to have the least deterrent power".

In March 2021, Bolsonaro replaced Fernando Azevedo e Silva with Walter Souza Braga Netto as defence minister; the latter, like Bolsonaro, lionized the 1964–1985 military dictatorship in Brazil, unlike Silva. A day later, the leaders of the army, air force, and navy all resigned. In April, Bolsonaro declared that the Brazilian armed forces would "go into the streets" if he ordered them. In mid-August, the military conducted a 10-minute tank parade in Brasília, with Bolsonaro in attendance. The parade had been held annually in the last 30 years, but tanks had never been sent to the capital before. The parade was only announced a day before, and it passed by the country's national congressional building, where lawmakers were due to vote on Bolsonaro's proposed election-related changes hours later. The lawmakers ultimately rejected the changes.

=== Election fraud claims ===
After Biden won the 2020 US presidential election, Bolsonaro was quick to make unsubstantiated allegations, along with Trump, that there was a possibility of fraud in the election. In an interview, he said he would wait to officially recognise Biden as president.

In January 2021, Bolsonaro said the Brazilian electronic voting system could fall victim to the same fate as that of the United States. He added that lack of confidence in the vote was to blame for the storming of the U.S. Capitol building, and that Brazil should return to printed ballots to avoid fraud.

Bolsonaro has claimed without evidence that the Brazilian electronic voting system is "riddled with fraud". Brazil's electoral authorities and Supreme Court have ordered an investigation into his campaign against the voting system. In response he claimed that the country was "under attack" and that he refused to be intimidated by the investigation. He also said there would be no election in 2022 unless the system was overhauled; these claims gave rise to thousands of protesters filling the streets to support the overhaul of the electronic voting system. Top judges across the country have rejected Bolsonaro's claims, stating that the system has been free of fraud since its introduction in 1996. Bolsonaro's critics have accused him of trying to stir distrust in the people of Brazil ahead of the 2022 election.

In early August 2021, Bolsonaro threatened to respond with unconstitutional measures to an investigation of his baseless allegations of fraud vulnerabilities within Brazil's electronic voting system, because he deemed that investigation unconstitutional. The investigation had been approved by Brazilian Supreme Court Justice Alexandre de Moraes. In mid-August 2021, Bolsonaro warned of a potential "institutional rupture", while urging the Brazilian Senate to charge Justice de Moraes and another Justice, Luis Roberto Barroso, the leader of the electoral court.

== Foreign policy ==
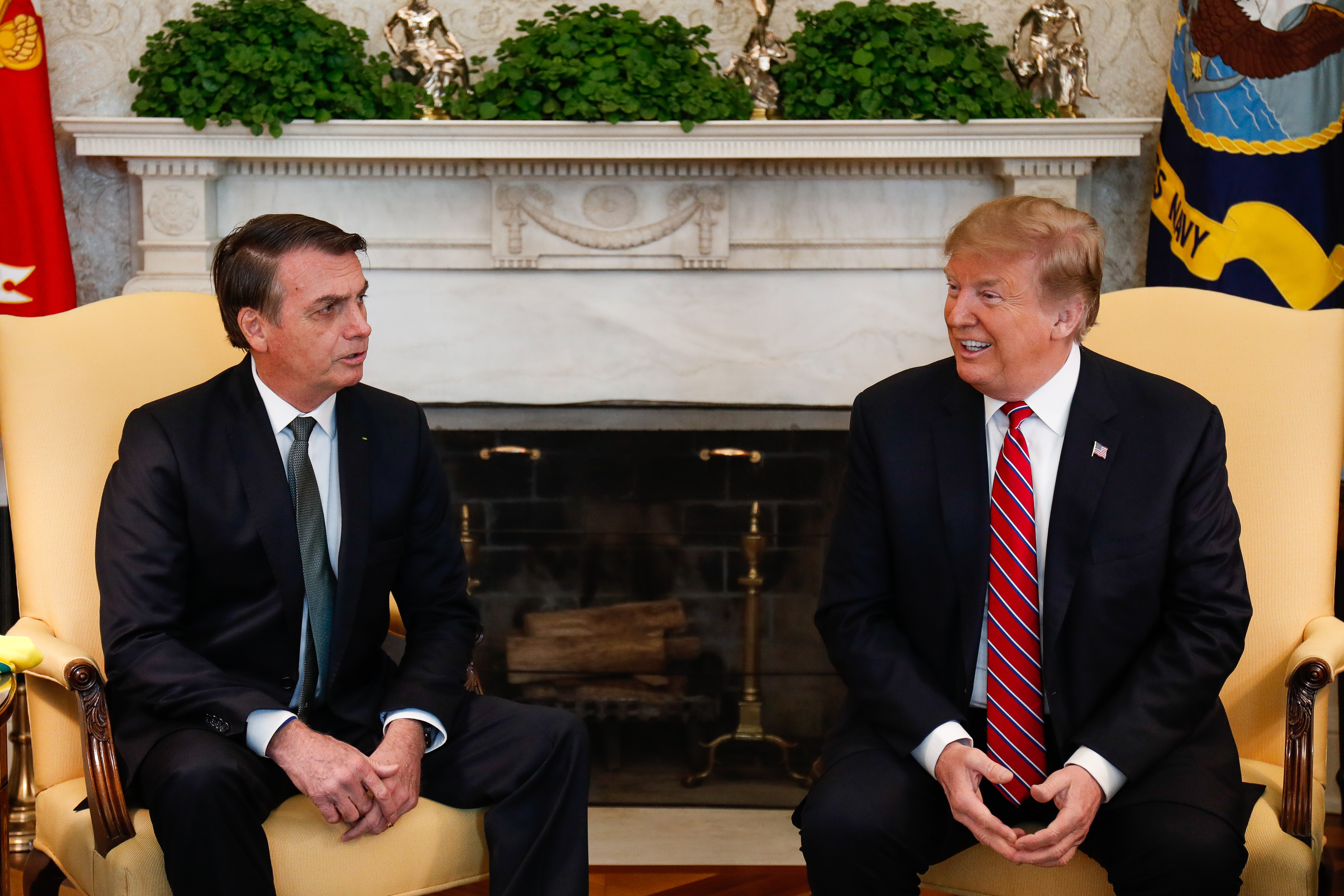
President Bolsonaro with US President Donald Trump at the White House, 19 March 2019

Foreign Affairs minister Ernesto Araújo had outlined five measures for the first 100 days of the Bolsonaro administration. The first two were official state visits of Bolsonaro to the United States and Israel; the third was revising Mercosur policies; the fourth was restoring the coat of arms to the cover of the Brazilian passport; and the fifth was ending visa requirements for U.S. and Canadian citizens.

During the 2018 presidential campaign, Bolsonaro said he would make considerable changes to Brazil's foreign relations, saying that the "Itamaraty needs to be in service of the values that were always associated with the Brazilian people". He also said that the country should stop "praising dictators" and attacking democracies, such as the United States, Israel and Italy. In early 2018, he affirmed that his "trip to the five democratic countries the United States, Israel, Japan, South Korea, and Taiwan showed who we will be and we would like to join good people". Bolsonaro has shown distrust towards China throughout the presidential campaign claiming they "[want to] buy Brazil", although Brazil recorded a US$20 billion trade surplus with China in 2018, and China is only the 13th largest source of foreign direct investment into Brazil. Bolsonaro said he wishes to continue to have business with the Chinese but he also said that Brazil should "make better [economic] deals" with other countries, with no "ideological agenda" behind it. His stance towards China has also been interpreted by some as an attempt to curry favour the Trump administration to garner concessions from the US. Bolsonaro said that his first international trip as president will be to Israel. Bolsonaro also said that the State of Palestine "is not a country, so there should be no embassy here", adding that "you don't negotiate with terrorists". The announcement was warmly received by the prime minister of Israel, Benjamin Netanyahu, who welcomed Bolsonaro to Israel in March 2019 during the final weeks of a re-election campaign, but was met with condemnation from the Arab League, which warned Bolsonaro it could damage diplomatic ties."I love Israel", Bolsonaro said in Hebrew at a welcoming ceremony, with Netanyahu at his side, at Tel Aviv's Ben-Gurion airport.

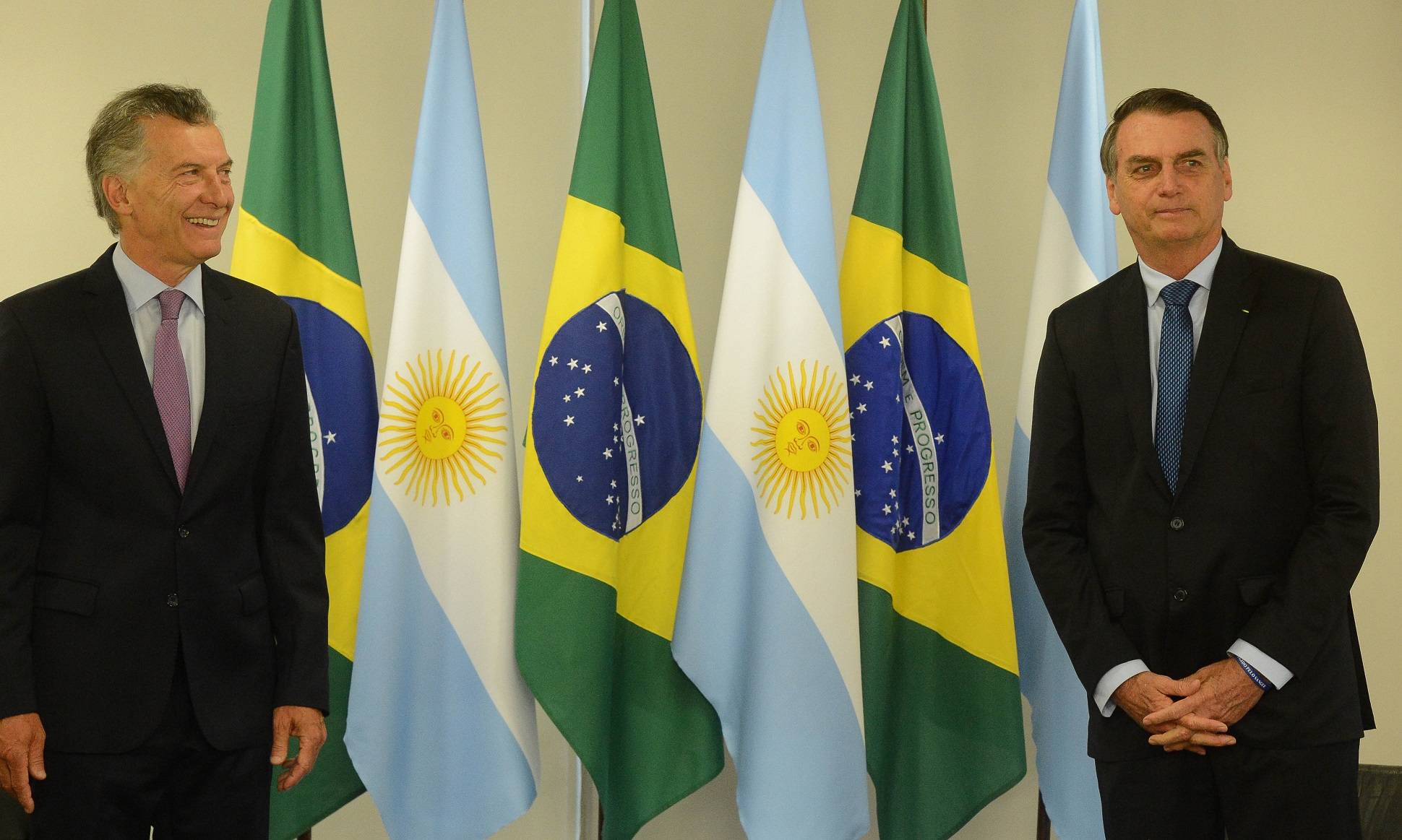
Argentine president Mauricio Macri with Bolsonaro, 16 January 2019

Argentine president Mauricio Macri was the first foreign leader to be received by Bolsonaro on a state visit to Brasília since he assumed the Brazilian presidency. Bolsonaro praised Macri for ending the 12-years rule of Néstor and Cristina Fernández de Kirchner, which he saw as similar to Lula and Rousseff. Although he does not have plans of leaving the Mercosur, he criticized that it gave priority to ideological issues instead of economic ones. A staunch anti-communist, Bolsonaro has condemned Cuba's former leader Fidel Castro and the current regime in that island.

Bolsonaro has also praised U.S. president Donald Trump and his foreign policy. Bolsonaro's son Eduardo has indicated that Brazil should distance itself from Iran, sever ties with Nicolás Maduro's government in Venezuela and relocate Brazil's embassy in Israel to Jerusalem. Bolsonaro is widely considered to be the most pro-American candidate in Brazil since the 1980s. PSL members have said that if elected, he will dramatically improve relations between the United States and Brazil. During an October 2017 campaign rally in Miami, he saluted the American flag and led chants of "USA! USA!" to a large crowd. U.S. National Security Advisor John Bolton praised Bolsonaro as a 'like-minded' partner and said his victory was a "positive sign" for Latin America.

On 7 March 2020, Bolsonaro was hosted by the U.S. president Donald Trump at Mar-a-Lago for a working dinner, where the two leaders discussed the U.S.-led effort to oust Venezuelan president Nicolás Maduro, a future trade deal and peace for the Middle East, also Trump reaffirmed his interest in upgrading the American military alliance with Brazil, suggesting give to the country a full NATO membership, as part of an effort to fortify the Western Hemisphere against Russian and Chinese influence.

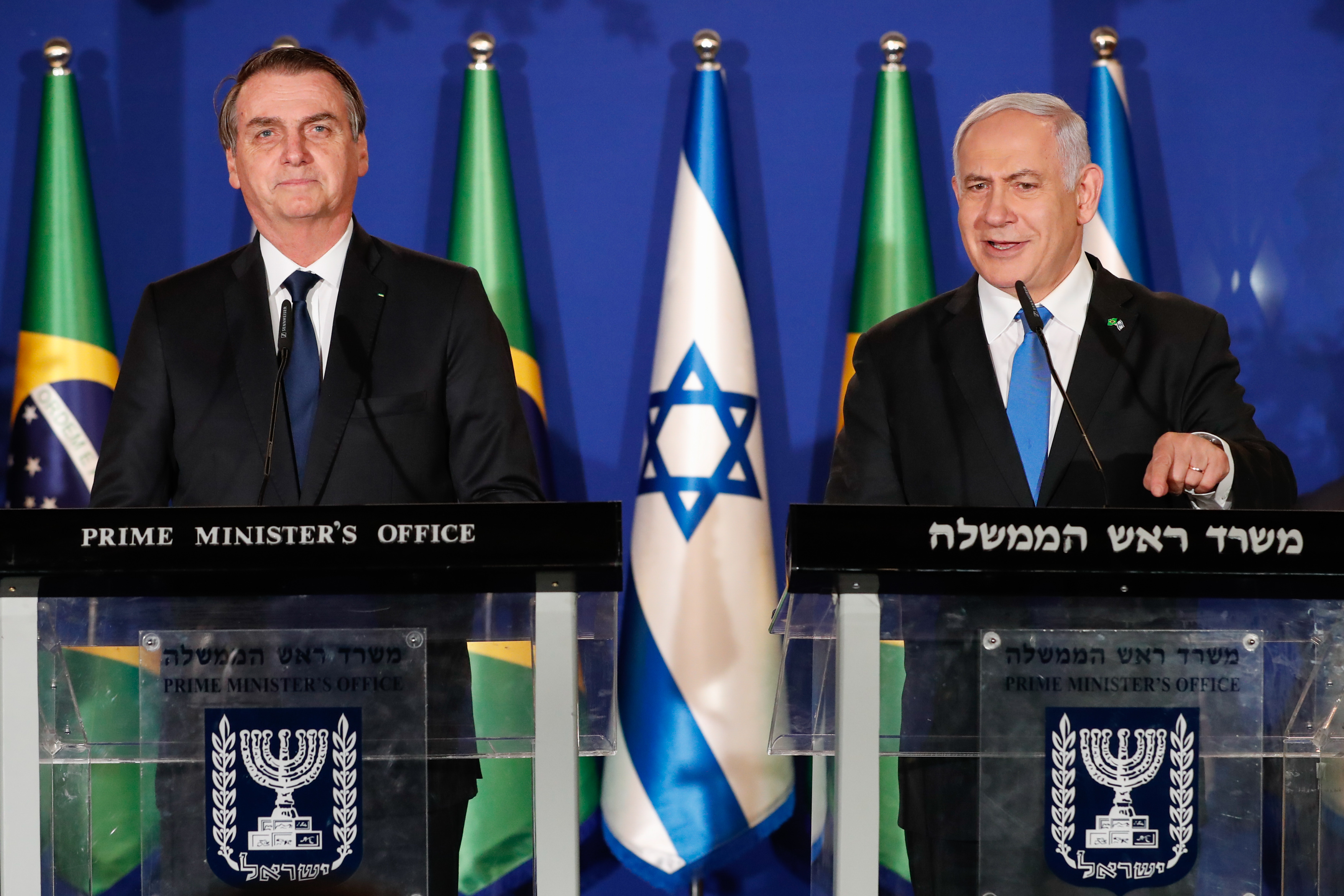
Bolsonaro with Israeli prime minister Benjamin Netanyahu in Tel Aviv, 31 March 2019

Bolsonaro praised Britain's prime minister Winston Churchill, saying that he had learned from Churchill: "Patriotism, love for your fatherland, respect for your flag – something that has been lost over the last few years here in Brazil ... and governing through example, especially at that difficult moment of the second world war". Bolsonaro said he's open to the possibility of hosting a U.S. military base in Brazil to counter Russian influence in the region.

With the intention of the U.S. president Donald Trump to make Brazil a NATO member in March 2019, Bolsonaro said: "the discussions with the United States will begin in the coming months". After protests for over his use of "homophobic, racist and misogynist remarks", a ceremony hosted by Brazilian-American Chamber of Commerce and set to award United States Secretary of State Mike Pompeo and Bolsonaro with person of the year awards for "fostering closer commercial and diplomatic ties between Brazil and the United States" was cancelled.

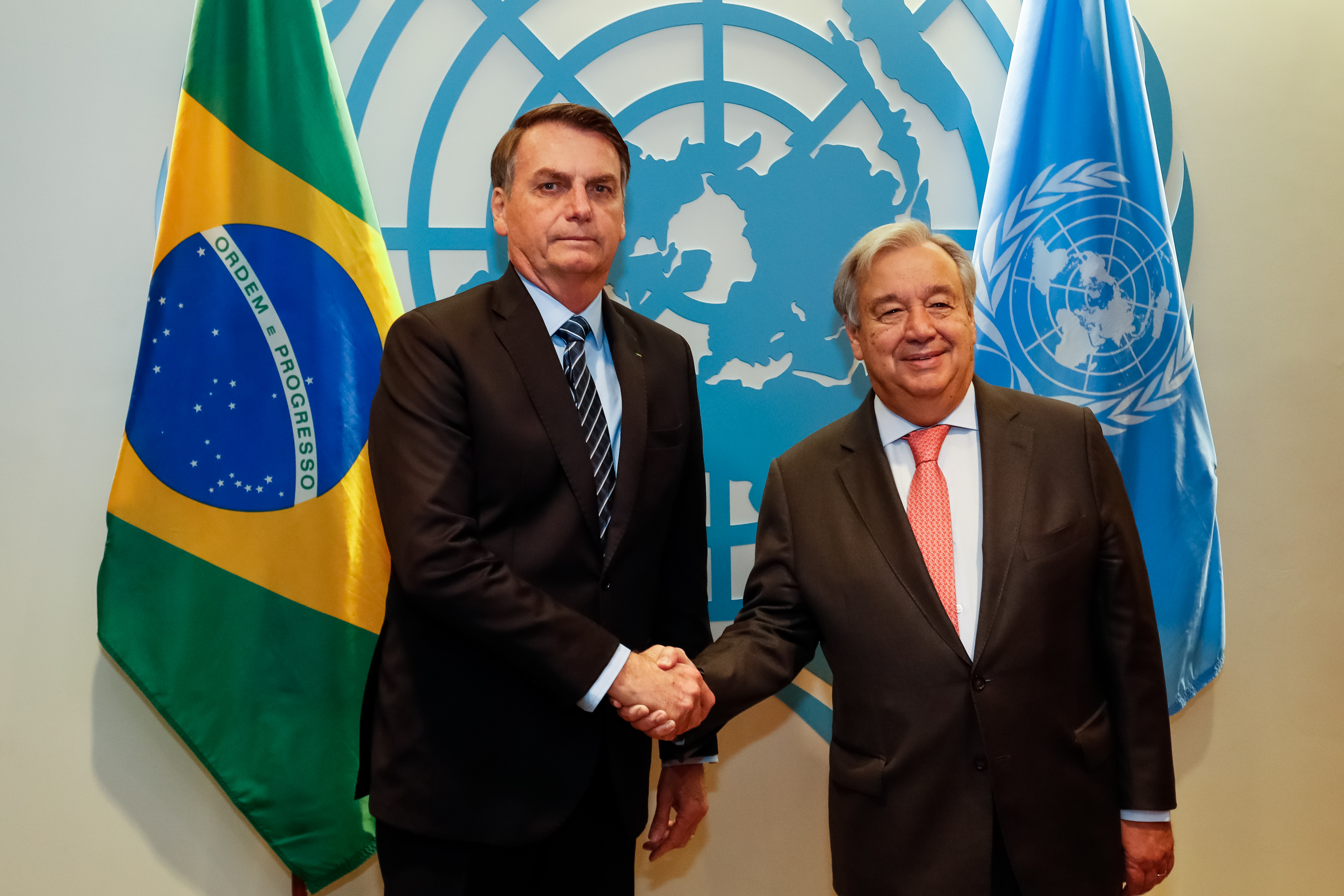
Bolsonaro with UN Secretary-General António Guterres in September 2019

On 25 January 2020, on his first state visit to India, Bolsonaro said that Brazil will continue to demand a permanent seat on the UN Security Council, and that will remain a priority on his government. Together with Indian prime minister Narendra Modi, he said that "Brazil and India are two great countries, among the ten largest economies in the world, that together have 1.5 billion inhabitants, are democratic countries. We believe that it will be good for the world if Brazil and India join this group". As head of state, he was the chief guest at the Delhi Republic Day parade on 26 January 2020.

On 20 January 2021, in a letter to the new U.S. president, Joe Biden, Bolsonaro wrote that he would work to strengthen ties between Brazil and the U.S. in the areas of economy, environment, defence, technology, both bilaterally and in international institutions in order to strengthen stability and security in the hemisphere and around the world. Biden welcomed Bolsonaro's words and the opportunity for the countries to join efforts, saying, "there are no limits to what Brazil and the U.S. can achieve together" and stressing that his administration was "ready to work closely with the Brazilian government in this new chapter of the bilateral relationship".

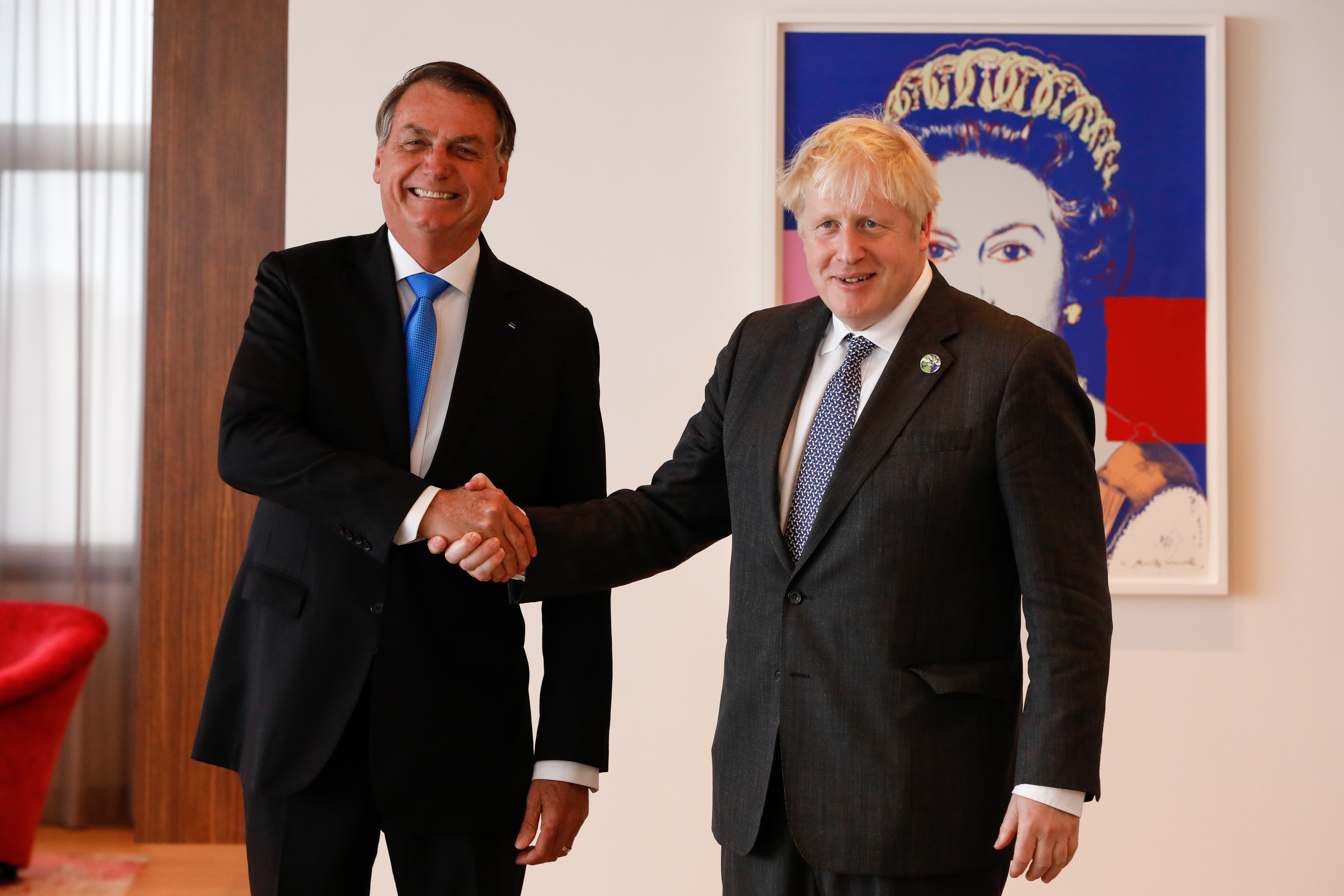
Bolsonaro with British prime minister Boris Johnson in New York, 20 September 2021

On 6 April 2021, Bolsonaro discussed with the Russian president, Vladimir Putin, the creation of a consortium between Brazil and Russia for the mass production of the COVID-19 vaccine Sputnik V, in Brazilian territory, in addition to cooperation in trade, defence, science and technology. During the administration of the U.S. president Donald Trump, the U.S. pushed Brazil to reject Sputnik V. According to The Economist magazine, Bolsonaro's policies are the main reason the EU has not ratified a trade deal with Mercosur.

On 15 June 2021, Brazil joined NASA's Artemis space programme. Bolsonaro joined U.S. Secretary of State Antony Blinken and NASA Administrator Bill Nelson to announce that Brazil is "committed to working with the United States and international partners for the fair and peaceful exploration of deep space".

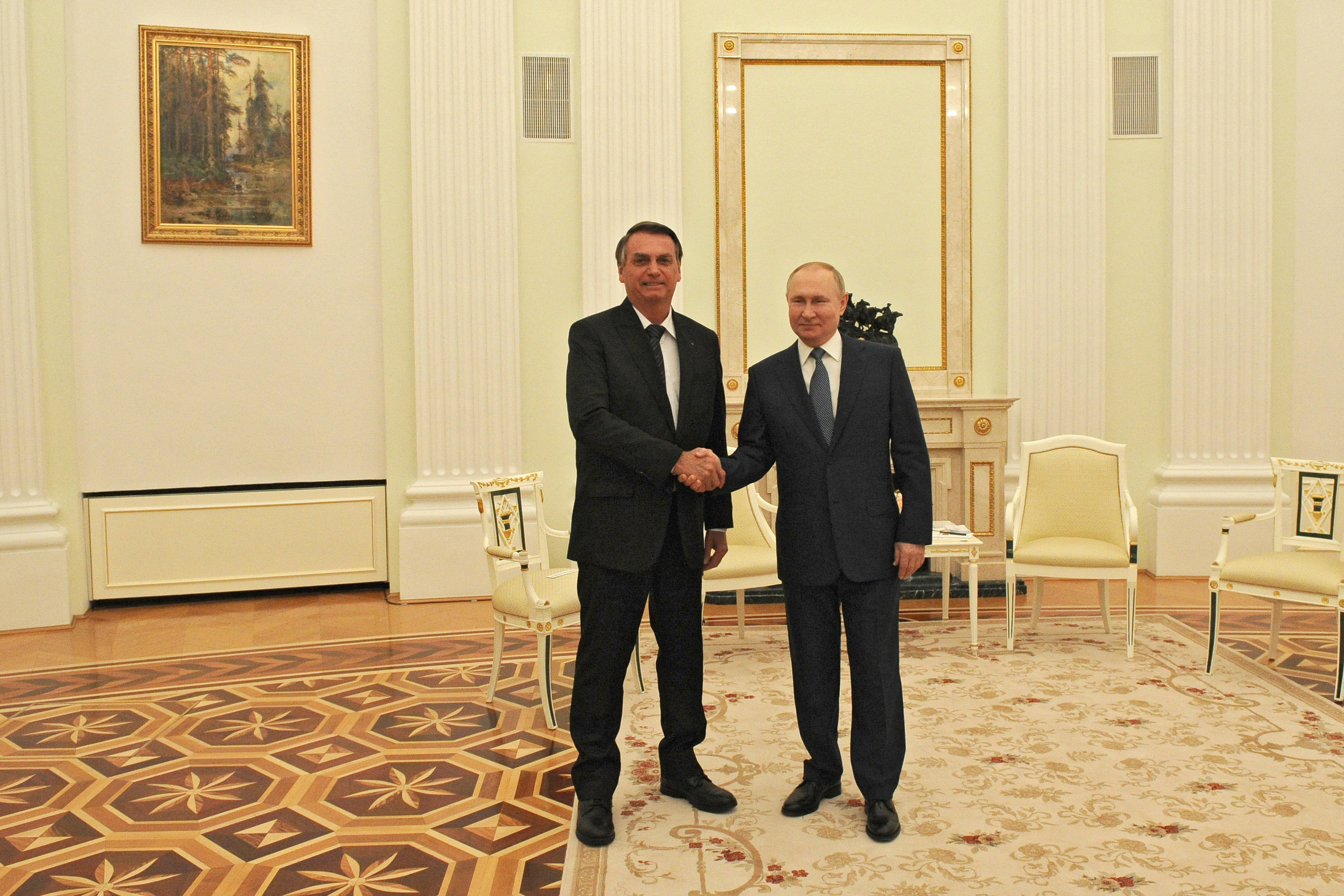
Bolsonaro with Russian president Vladimir Putin in Moscow, 16 February 2022

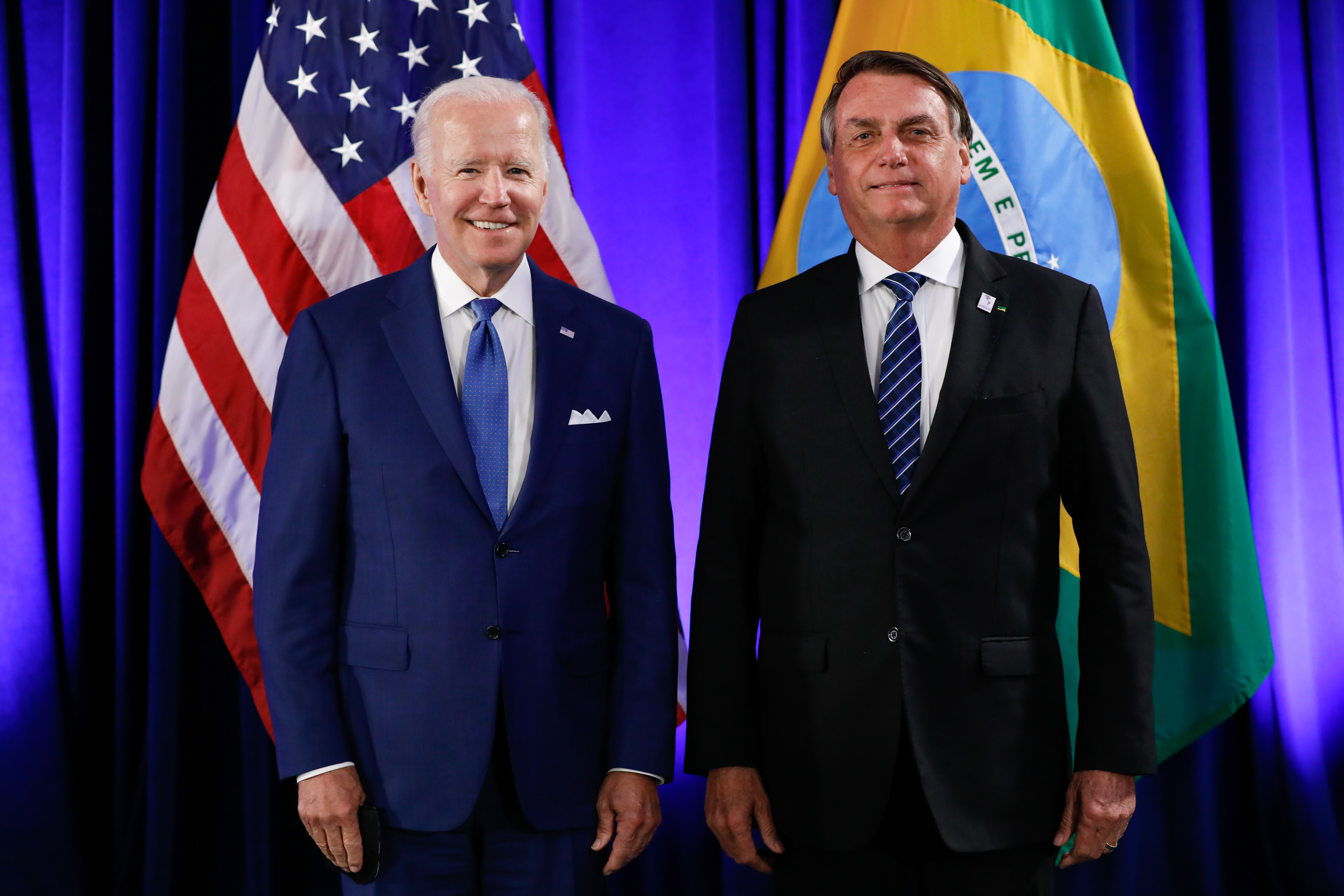
President Bolsonaro with US President Joe Biden at the 9th Summit of the Americas in Los Angeles, 9 June 2022

=== Immigration ===
On 8 January 2019, minister of foreign affairs Ernesto Araújo asked diplomats to inform the UN that Brazil had withdrawn from the Global Compact for Migration.

=== Venezuela ===
The Bolsonaro administration declared on 12 January 2019, that it recognized Juan Guaidó, the acting president of Venezuela appointed by the National Assembly, as the legitimate president of Venezuela amidst the Venezuelan presidential crisis.

=== Free trade ===
Bolsonaro supported the European Union–Mercosur Free Trade Agreement, which would form one of the world's largest free trade areas.

== Investigations ==
Of the new ministers announced, five are or were subjected to investigation: Luiz Henrique Mandetta, Tereza Cristina, Onyx Lorenzoni, Paulo Guedes and Marcos Pontes. Onyx Lorenzoni, the chief of staff, is suspected of receiving an undeclared amount of R$100,000 in campaign donations in 2012 and 2014, the latter of which he confessed to. Tereza Cristina, the Minister of Agriculture, is accused of having benefited JBS in a process of land leasing while she was Secretary of State for Agrarian Development and Production of Mato Grosso do Sul. Cristina has defended her actions as "acting in accordance with government policy". Economy Minister Paulo Guedes is under investigation by the Federal Police for allegations that he mismanaged public pension funds. Science and Technology Minister Marcos Pontes was investigated by military prosecutors in 2007 for supposedly making commercial use of his public image before entering the military reserve, which is forbidden according to the Military Penal Code. Pontes denied wrongdoing, stating that "there is nothing irregular in my professional activities". Health Minister Mandetta is being probed for alleged procurement fraud, influence peddling and undeclared campaign donations.

After allegations of campaign-finance fraud, Bolsonaro fired Gustavo Bebianno, a top adviser and general secretary for the president. His party was accused of diverting public campaign funds to candidates that did not run for office. Bebianno claimed to have formal documentation for all the funds he requested at direction by the State. In July 2019, it was reported that Bolsonaro and other cabinet members were the targets of a cellphone hacking operation to expose corruption in high-profile trials.

=== Education Ministry corruption ===
In March 2022, an exposé was published about a group of evangelical pastors who, despite not being government officials and having no qualifications in education, have been operating a scheme that funneled money from the Brazilian Ministry of Education into several cities, at the behest of associated mayors and business people, skirting formal processes for allocation of funds. The pastors allegedly bribed mayors — with cash, gold bullion and even Bible copies to be distributed to the pastors' churches — in exchange of access to authorities and earmarks directed to the cities governed by those mayors. Some mayors also reported that those who denounced the scheme were retaliated through central government's suspension of previously agreed funding to local education and child care programmes and initiatives in those cities. On 22 March, the then-Minister of Education Milton Ribeiro admitted, in a conversation with other pastors involved in the scheme, that he misused ministry's funds, diverting them to cities at Bolsonaro's request. Ribeiro stepped down from his office after those news broke out and opposition lawmakers in the Brazilian Senate have since been pushing for a Senate inquiry committee to investigate the allegations of corruption and other crimes by government officials and the pastors.

As of June 2022, Federal Police of Brazil and Public Prosecutor's Office have been investigating Bolsonaro government officials and others. On 22 June 2022, as a result of their investigations, both former Education Minister Milton Ribeiro and the pastors were arrested on corruption charges in a pretrial detention. A day after they were arrested, a judge released the former minister and four suspects from jail. Additionally, prosecutors and federal police officers suspect president Bolsonaro interfered with the investigations because of a telephone tapping authorized by a court in which the former minister says the president told him he "believed" police were going to search the former minister's house. The prosecutors asked the judge overseeing the investigations that they were sent to the Brazilian Supreme Court due to presidential immunity.

=== Sexual harassment scandal ===
On 28 June 2022, as part of a journalistic investigation into broad reports of workplace harassment inside the federal government-owned bank Caixa Econômica Federal, several female employees accused Pedro Guimarães, an economist who had been the bank's CEO since he was appointed by Bolsonaro in 2019, of sexual harassment. Most of the reports but not all said Guimarães, among other things, flirted, groped and invited the women out while they were travelling on business. The investigation also revealed audio records from Guimarães, with strong offensive language and even violent attitude towards employees on other occasions, and that at least one internal investigation related to the sexual harassment accusations was dropped by a Caixa committee tasked with probing staff wrongdoings. On 29 June, he stepped down as the bank's CEO after Bolsonaro allies feared the accusations could undermine his re-election campaign, especially among female voters, since Guimarães and Bolsonaro are close friends and used to make public appearances together. In addition, prosecutors opened multiple investigations against Guimarães, such as criminal, civil and labour procedures. On 19 July, a director at Caixa's internal affairs committee charged with receiving complaints was found dead at the bank's headquarters in Brasilia, Brazil's federal capital, leading to a local police investigation which is currently underway.

=== COVID-19 pandemic ===
Bolsonaro dismissed the threat of COVID-19, calling it a "little flu". Soon after, his then-Justice Minister Sergio Moro resigned. The leading medical journal The Lancet has dubbed Bolsonaro as the biggest threat to Brazil amidst the COVID-19 pandemic. It said that Bolsonaro's disregard for and flouting of lockdown measures were sowing confusion in Brazilian society. Bolsonaro has attacked lockdown measures implemented by some of Brazil's governors. His Health Minister Nelson Teich resigned after serving only a month. Bolsonaro has also actively participated in anti-lockdown rallies. Bolsonaro also earned criticism for his actual methods to counter the pandemic, promoting the unproven usage of chloroquine as treatment, advocating for herd immunity, and rejecting various offerings of a COVID-19 vaccine which caused the country's vaccination effort to start late and with few resources.

Brazil's Health Ministry hid months of data on COVID-19 from public view on 6 June 2020, and stopped giving total counts of confirmed cases (above 672,000, second only to the United States) and deaths (more than 35,000). "The cumulative data ... does not reflect the moment the country is in", Bolsonaro wrote on Twitter.

On 7 July 2020, Bolsonaro announced that he had tested positive.

=== Accusations of violating international law ===
In late November 2019, a group of Brazilian lawyers, a human rights group and six former government ministers denounced Bolsonaro before the International Criminal Court in The Hague for inciting the genocide of indigenous peoples of Brazil and perpetrating crime against humanity. A 60-page document was presented to chief prosecutor Fatou Bensouda listing official speeches by Bolsonaro as well as 33 of his actions linked with criminal character. Among his attacks on the indigenous peoples of Brazil were calling them "prehistoric men" and comparing them to "animals in zoos".

On 3 April 2020, the Brazilian Association of Jurists for Democracy forwarded to the ICC a complaint against Bolsonaro for crime against humanity. Procedures have been requested to investigate his evasive and contradictory recommendations to fight COVID-19.

In late July 2020, the Brazilian Union Network UNISaúde, a coalition of trade unions representing more than one million health workers in Brazil, filed a judicial complaint against Bolsonaro to the International Court of Justice, citing his "attitude of contempt, neglect, negativism" during the COVID-19 pandemic. The document was sent to the International Criminal Court on the grounds that this constituted a crime against humanity.

On 15 September 2020, the ICC rejected the Brazilian Association of Jurists' complaint against Bolsonaro, but it may be reconsidered based on new evidence. However, in December 2020 it placed the 2019 case under preliminary jurisdiction review.

On 23 January 2021, two top Brazilian indigenous leaders, Chief Raoni Metuktire of the Kayapo people, and Chief Almir Narayamoga Surui of the Paiter Surui tribe, sued Bolsonaro for crimes against humanity. Deforestation in the Amazon rainforest has increased by 50% since Bolsonaro took office in 2019, further threatening endangered traditional communities. In 2019, invasions of indigenous territories increased by 135%, also indicating that their rights are violated and that people are regularly killed. Lawyer William Bourdon filed a request for preliminary examination to the ICC.

In June 2021, Brazil Lawyers Order continued their action to bring Bolsonaro to the International Criminal Court over his "irresponsible" management of the COVID-19 pandemic. A request by Brazil's prosecutor general office was sent to the country's jurisdiction to investigate Bolsonaro for negligence in the case of corruption allegations related to the purchase of Covaxin vaccines from India. Twenty million doses of the vaccine were purchased for $317 million through a contract signed by the Health Ministry that was plagued by irregularities. The police investigation would last 90 days.

In July 2021, the Articulation of Indigenous Peoples of Brazil filed an additional ICC complaint against Bolsonaro, on top of the one filed in 2019, for crimes against humanity, genocide, and ecocide, within the context of the devastation of the Amazon rainforest. In October, climate lawyers from the Austrian group AllRise filed yet another complaint about a "widespread attack on the Amazon, its dependents and its defenders that not only result in the persecution, murder and inhumane suffering in the region, but also upon the global population."

== 2020 political crisis ==
Investigations continued in 2020. In April 2020 justice minister Sergio Moro resigned, alleging that Bolsonaro was improperly pressuring him to remove the federal police chief; Bolsonaro subsequently removed and replaced the chief with a family friend of Bolsonaro. Police executed search warrants against key Bolsonaro supporters in May 2020 on charges of libel and intimidation, prompting Bolsonaro, while wearing a tie decorated with images of assault rifles, to exclaim "This is fucking over". Bolsonaro attended protests in 2020 that The Guardian characterized as "anti-democratic protests where demonstrators have called for congress and the supreme court to be closed or even torched". On 30 May 2020 prominent Bolsonaro opponents, across the political spectrum, expressed unity against Bolsonaro and launched the Movimento Estamos Juntos ("We Are Together Movement"). Lower-house speaker Rodrigo Maia publicly mulled a future impeachment of Bolsonaro "at the appropriate time", but stated that for now the priority was to fight the COVID-19 pandemic in Brazil.

== Surveys ==
According to a survey by Ibope, released by the National Confederation of Industry on 13 December 2018, 75% of Brazilian population thought that Bolsonaro was "on the right path", while 14% thought Bolsonaro was "on the wrong path" and another 11% did not respond. On 23 December 2018, Folha de São Paulo published a survey of Datafolha in which 65% of respondents said that Brazil's economy would highly improve under Bolsonaro's governance, while 6% said that it would highly worsen and another 29% did not respond. This was the highest rate of optimism regarding the future of the economy since 1997, when Fernando Henrique Cardoso was re-elected president.

Another Datafolha survey, published on 1 January 2019, showed that 65% of respondents believe the Bolsonaro administration would be "great or good"; 17% believe it would be "regular", 12% believe it would be "bad or awful", while 6% did not respond. This rate of optimism regarding the administration is smaller than those for the first terms of presidents Collor, Cardoso, Lula and Dilma but higher than those of Franco and Temer.

In the few months following his election, Bolsonaro's popularity steadily declined. Another Datafolha survey, published on 21 May 2019, showed that 34% of respondents considered the Bolsonaro administration as "great or good"; 26% as "regular", 36% as "bad or awful", while 4% did not respond. This was the first time more Brazilians rejected the politics of Bolsonaro than affirmed it. Later in 2020, as the pandemic spread, his popularity bounced back up and was the highest since his inauguration.

As of 2021, in the midst of economic uncertainty and the COVID-19 virus still rampaging through the country, Bolsonaro's approval ratings fell sharply again to the lowest levels of his presidency.

On 13 January 2022, the Human Rights Watch criticised the Bolsonaro administration for promoting anti-human rights policies, including Indigenous rights, women's rights, disability rights, and free speech. The Washington-based group urged Brazil's democratic institutions to protect voting and speech rights leading to the October 2022 presidential elections from any attempt by Jair Bolsonaro to subvert the electoral system.

== See also ==
- Pension reform in Brazil
- Presidency of Michel Temer
- Controversies involving Jair Bolsonaro
