= 2010 Enem issues =

Printing error in Brazilian university entrance exams

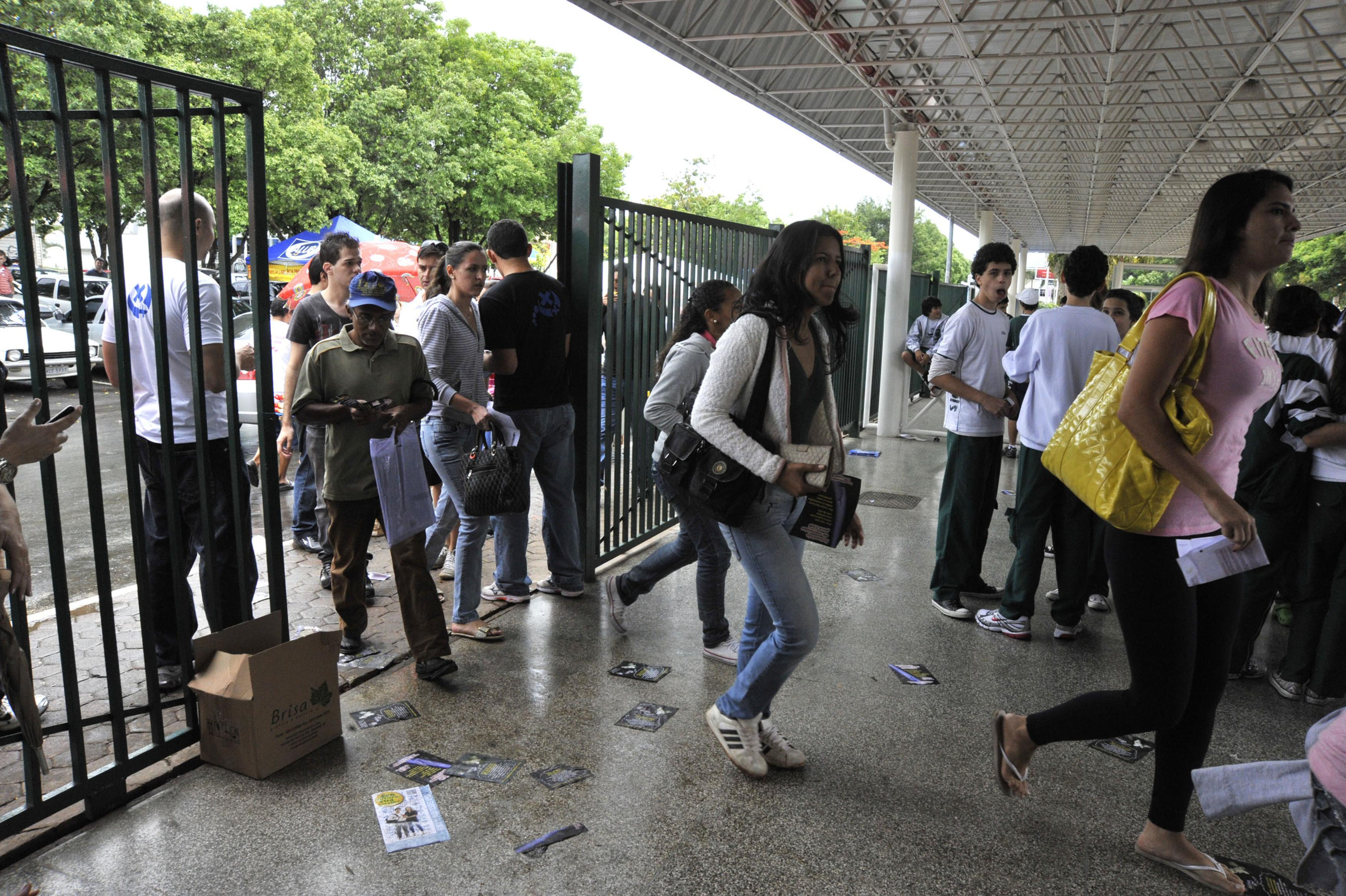
2010 Enem candidates.

2010 Enem issues (Portuguese: Falha do Enem de 2010) consisted of a printing error in some of the tests of the National High School Exam (Exame Nacional do Ensino Médio - Enem), a test given in Brazil to all high school students, for the purpose of selection to various universities, as well as to assess the level of quality of educational institutions.

The issue in 2010 involved a change in the position of the questions on the answer sheets and a subsequent legal challenge to their validity, with Enem being preventively suspended by order of the Federal Court in Ceará, with effect for the whole country, and leading the Government to various reactions in defense of the exam, which had faced challenges in consecutive years.

== Background ==
The RR Donnelley printing company, responsible for printing the exam, confirmed that 33,000 yellow test booklets were made with various errors. Given out on the first day of the exam, 21,000 copies with errors were distributed for use. Reports from students indicated the presence of duplicate questions, missing questions, or inconsistencies in numbering. In addition, they said that there were questions from the white test in the yellow booklet.

As a result, the Ministry of Education (MEC) estimated that around 2,000 people had the right to take a new test and announced that the exam could be retaken by these students between the end of November and the beginning of December 2010, and decided not to consider the cancellation of the tests for the other candidates.

The failures found in the defective tests were as follows:

- Number repetition for two questions:
1. Two questions had the number 23;
2. The first question with the number 23 was identical to question number 29;
3. The second question with the number 23 was the same as question number 21;
- Identical questions:
1. 33 equals 38;
2. 50 equals 48;
3. 54 was the same as 51;
- Duplication of questions 34, 61, and 74 on two pages;
- Duplication of questions 35 and 73, but with different questions, the latter being the same as number 75;
- Duplication of question 49, with the same content;
- Duplication of question 73, with different content;
- Duplication of question 81, one of which was identical to question 80;
- Jumps in page numbers: from page 29 to page 32; from 52 to 54; from 63 to 65 and from 75 to 80;
- Insertion of pages from the “white test” in the middle of the yellow pages on pages 6-7, 9, 14, 17, 22 and 25.

== Government reaction ==
As soon as the students left the test and reported their mistakes on the Internet's social networks, the issue gained repercussions, especially due to concerns about a repetition of the situations of the 2009 exam. At first, the Ministry of Education addressed students posting comments on the Twitter social network with a warning. On its Twitter page, the ministry threatened:

Students who have already 'danced' at Enem are trying to stir up trouble with messages on social networks. They are being monitored and followed up. Inep may sue them.

This message was interpreted by some as a reference to the use of cell phones in the test room. On November 10, three candidates were eliminated for having accessed Twitter during the exam. The students are from Tocantins, Pernambuco, and Minas Gerais. On November 12, Minister Fernando Haddad apologized for this message at a meeting with the National Union of Students (UNE) and the Brazilian Union of Secondary Students (Ubes). The two organizations said at the meeting that many students had written asking for the exam not to be annulled.

The President of the Republic, on a trip to Mozambique, gave an interview on November 8, in which he declared that “Enem's success was total and absolute” and that nothing had gone wrong, attributing the negative news about Enem to criticism from those opposed to the exam. On November 10, however, President Lula denied this, stating that the reported issues would be investigated by the Federal Police and that “If we have to take one test, we will. If we have to do two, we will. If we have to do three, we will, but Enem will continue to be strengthened."

== Judicial dispute and police intervention ==
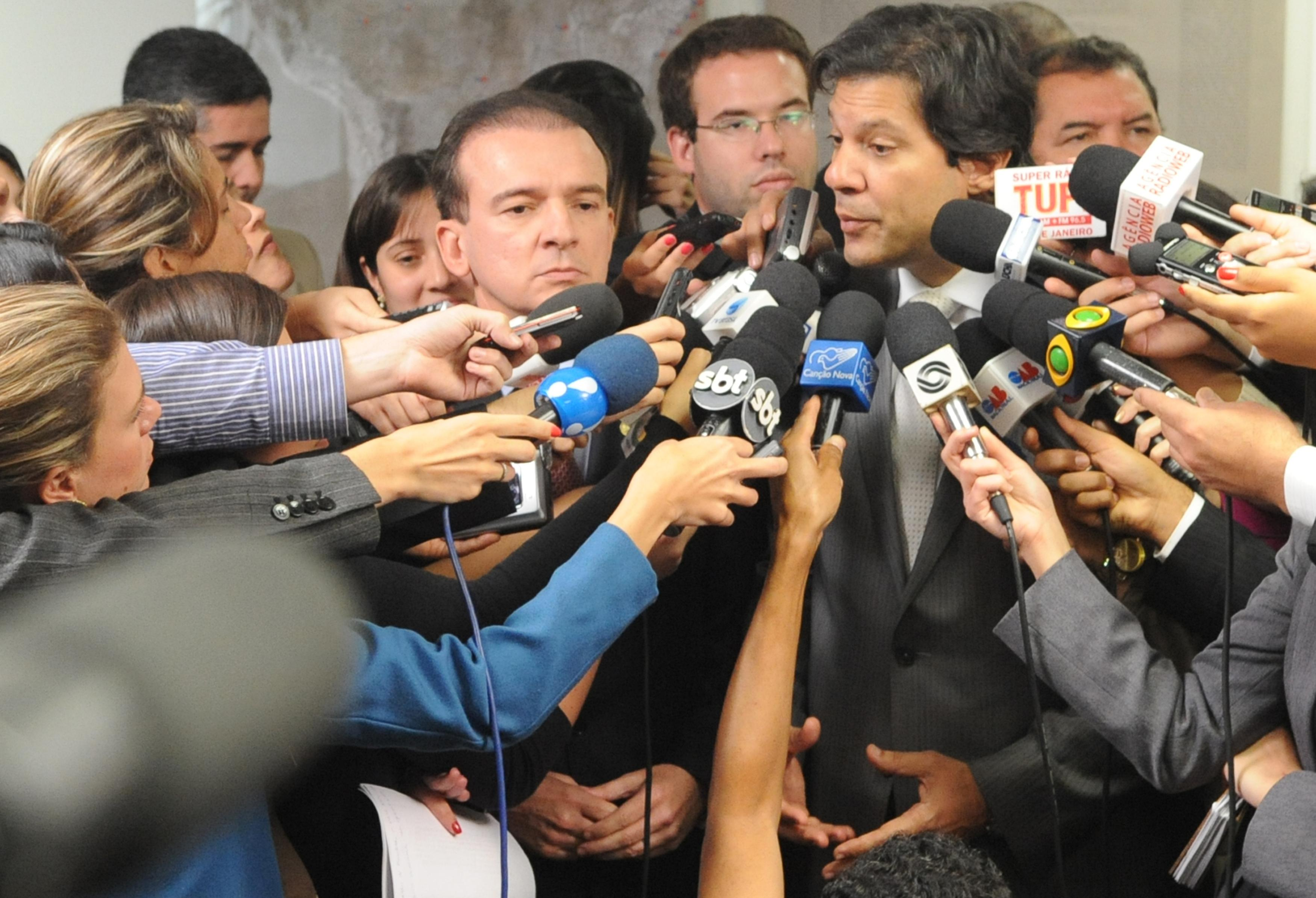
The Minister of Education, Fernando Haddad, provides clarifications on the Enem issues, alongside the president of the OAB, Ophir Cavalcante.

Judge Karla de Almeida Miranda Maia, of the 7th Federal Court of Justice in Ceará, suspended the entire exam. On the afternoon of November 9, she also ruled that the decision included the release of the answer templates and prohibited the retaking of the exam.

The Advocacy General of the Union said it would appeal the decision. The judge who issued the injunction might not reverse it, in which case the appeal against upholding it would have to be sent to the Tribunal Regional Federal da 5.ª Região. The MEC had intended to set up a website for students to complain about the exam but gave up on doing so in view of the court ruling.

The controversy deepened when allegations surfaced that one of the essay topics had been leaked before the exam. Reports from students and a teacher in the city of Petrolina, Pernambuco, claimed that candidates had been given a choice between two essay topics: "the work of the future" and "slavery." Several students, who had attended a help desk set up by local teachers, reportedly asked for guidance regarding the "work and slavery" topic. It was later revealed that a student from São Raimundo Nonato, about 300 kilometers from Petrolina, had received information about the topic in advance, and rumors of the leak spread within the community.

The Federal Police in Juazeiro, Bahia, launched an investigation into the claims. During the inquiry, four individuals were questioned, including two teachers from the Geo Pre-Vestibular course in Petrolina. The investigation ultimately concluded that the exam had been leaked. A teacher from Remanso, Bahia, had seen the essay topic two hours before the exam and informed her husband in Petrolina. He then passed the information to their son, who in turn asked teachers for guidance on the "work and slavery" subject. Both the teacher administering the exam and her husband have been charged with breach of confidentiality, a crime punishable by up to six years in prison under current legal provisions.

On November 12, the court decision was overturned by the president of the Federal Regional Court of the 5th Region, Luiz Alberto Gurgel de Faria.

After the injunction was overturned, the Ministry of Education announced that it would release the test results and a new exam could be held on December 4 and 5. The website, initially suspended, was reopened to allow candidates to request corrections of the inverted templates. The Federal Attorney General's Office said that there was no reason to annul the 2010 Enem stating that the mistake affected a limited number of candidates and emphasizing the exam's established role in university and company selection processes. However, Ceará prosecutor Oscar Costa Filho filed an appeal against the TRF's decision to release the Enem, asking all fifteen of the court's judges to review the issue. The prosecutor also raised concerns about the website's process for correcting the inverted templates.

The test results were released on the afternoon of November 12. On November 17, the Federal Court of Ceará granted all candidates affected by the yellow test or the inversion of the test the right to take a new test, upon submitting a request on the Enem website. The ruling also ordered the Ministry of Education's website to keep the complaint page up until 11:59 p.m. on November 26. In the last week of November, the MEC had already decided to summon the 2,000 affected candidates for a new test, the date of which would be set on the same day as the summons. It also accepted the alternative of inverted correction of the templates. According to the court decision, any candidate could ask to retake the exam.

On November 18, the new injunction was overturned by the president of the Federal Regional Court of the 5th Region, Luiz Alberto Gurgel de Faria, in Recife, because changing the MEC's schedule could result in delaying the universities' selection process. As a result, the ministry's plan to retake the exam for 2,000 candidates in the yellow exam and to correct the exams of other candidates in reverse order was upheld.

On November 19, attorney Oscar Filho met with students and announced plans to file a new lawsuit seeking to guarantee any student the right to retake the exam. He made the overturned injunction available online to provide students with additional resources for their appeals to the MEC. According to the prosecutor, it was not feasible for the MEC to determine which candidates had been harmed, and therefore all candidates should be offered the opportunity to retake the exam.

On November 23, the Ministry of Education announced that the exam would be held on December 15 for 2,817 students and would only include questions from the humanities and natural sciences.

On November 26, the Federal Public Defender's Office in Rio de Janeiro sent a letter to the Ministry of Education asking for the date of the exam to be postponed. Federal defender André Ordacgy argued that many students worked and might not be able to take the exam on a Wednesday, that heavy traffic could hinder access to the test site, and that many universities would be holding their entrance exams on the same day. The MEC said it had chosen the date, December 15, so as not to coincide with the country's university entrance exams. Also on November 26, the Federal Police announced that they were investigating a possible new fraud. A student from Petrolina reportedly had access to the exam a few days earlier and shared it with others.

On November 30, prosecutor Oscar Costa Filho delivered a report to the president of the Order of Attorneys of Brazil(OAB). According to the Federal Public Prosecutor's Office in Ceará, the exam contained issues, and it would forward the report to the Federal Court to support an incidental declaratory action, seeking the annulment of the 2010 Enem exam. On December 1, the OAB asked for the exam to be annulled due to the leaking of the essay topic in Remanso. According to the organization, this incident was significant, potentially involving more candidates, and represented a breach of confidentiality in a public exam. The MEC stated that the case of the leak was limited to one student, who had already been disqualified.

On December 2, the Ministry of Education and the Instituto Nacional de Estudos e Pesquisas Educacionais Anísio Teixeira (Inep) declined to sign an agreement with the Attorney General's Office aimed at resolving issues related to the Enem. According to the agreement, Inep should correct questions 1 to 45 as being from the humanities and their technologies and questions 46 to 90 as being from the natural sciences and their technologies. It was also supposed to present a list of candidates who had been disadvantaged and allow ample room for appeals. Following the decision not to sign the agreement, Oscar Costa Filho's public civil action proceeded in the Federal Court of Ceará.

On December 3, the Public Defender's Office of Minas Gerais filed a request for an injunction with the Federal Court so that the MEC could allow all students who claimed to have been disadvantaged to retake the exam, rather than limiting it to the 2,817 students initially called by the ministry. The MEC issued a statement affirming that it will faithfully comply with the decision of the Federal Regional Court of the 5th Region, which it considers to have resolved the matter. This TRF decision was favorable to the solution proposed by the government.

On December 7, the Federal Court of Minas Gerais ruled that the Federal Court of Ceará had jurisdiction to hear the public civil action with a request for an injunction because there was a connection between the cases being heard in the two states. On December 9, Inep published in the Federal Official Gazette a list of 218 municipalities in seventeen states where the 2,817 students who had been summoned to retake the humanities and natural sciences exams could be taken. The Ministry of Education maintained its decision to retake the Enem only for the candidates identified as disadvantaged.

On December 10, Inep invited 9,500 students, exceeding the initially planned 2,817, and announced that participation in the retake would be voluntary, with the correction of the previous test remaining valid. 60 percent of the students were from Paraná and Santa Catarina.

== More repercussions ==
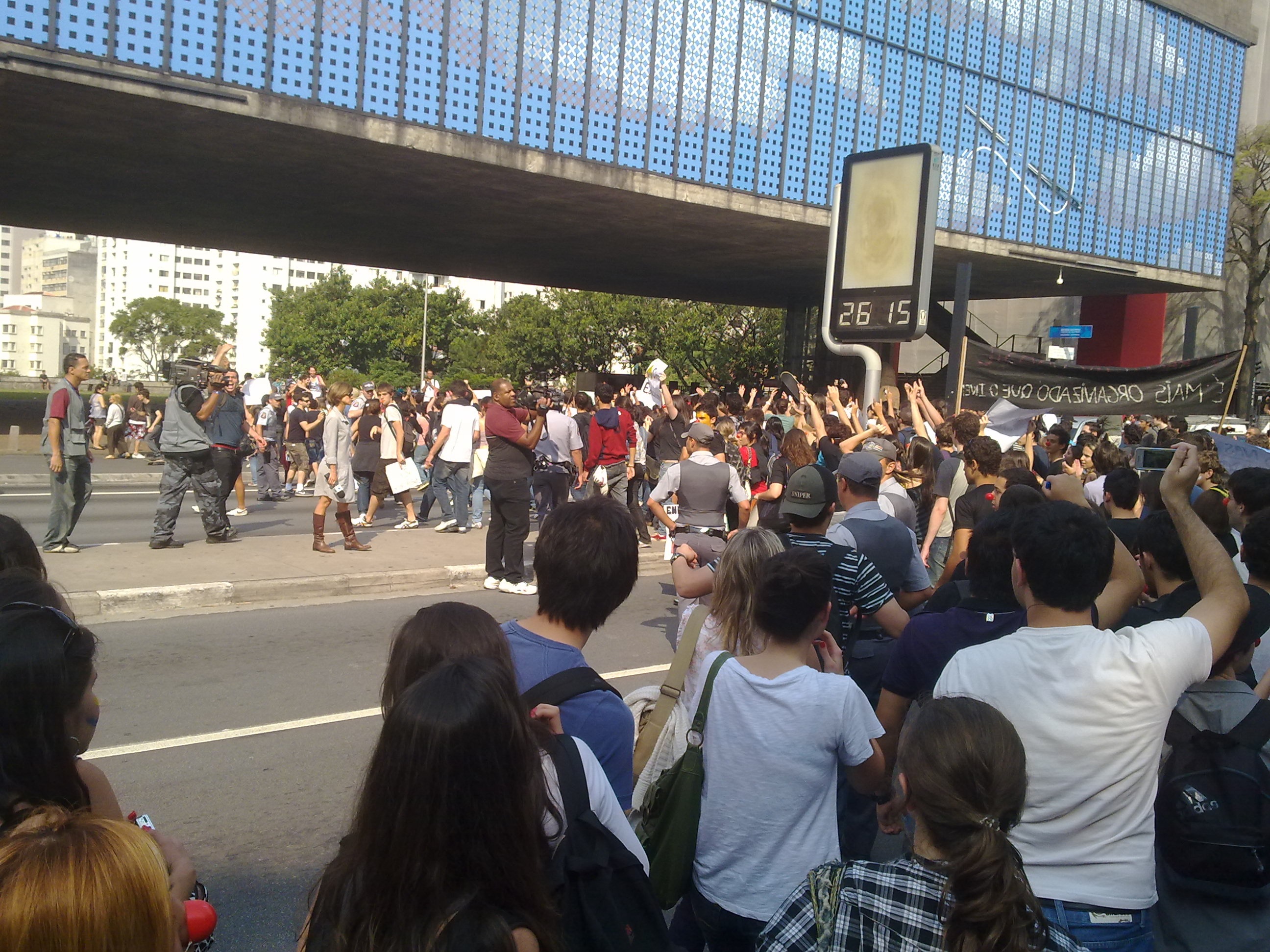
Student protest on Paulista Avenue.

Senator Marisa Serrano has called on Education Minister Fernando Haddad to provide clarifications regarding the state entrance exam, considering concerns raised about a similar situation in 2009. The hearing was scheduled for the third week of November and the minister stated that the process was transparent. He also said that the error was within the technical tolerance margin in the entrance exams and that he intended to release the templates, adhering to the applicable legal framework.

According to the ministry, the tests can only be checked on a sample basis citing limited staff availability to review the millions of tests and noting that the error corresponded to 0.003% of the printed volume. The printing company argued that the contract with the government required secrecy and that the review could not be carried out with the printed material, but recognized the occurrence of an editing error in the yellow booklet.

The mathematical theory used to construct the tests considers parameters such as discriminant, degree of difficulty, and random matching. The focus is on the individual question and the probability of the student getting each one right is calculated separately, so the questions have different weights and each one takes several factors into account. The theory, which has been used since 1995 in the Sistema Nacional de Avaliação da Educação Básica (Saeb), was adopted for Enem in 2009. Experts interviewed by Portal G1 said that the theory guarantees that a new test would not benefit students because the chance of getting it right or wrong doesn't change, the degree of difficulty is the same.

Student organizations mobilized in response to the situation. In Niterói, students marched with clown noses and slogans, and in Ceará, they organized themselves via Orkut (in the community Protesto Enem 2010) to protest in front of the Federal University of Ceará, which uses the exam as its only means of access. The Nova Organização Voluntária Estudantil (Nove) and Movimento dos Vestibulandos Ativistas Sem Enem (Mova-se) also organized marches and protests.

On November 15, students organized protests in São Paulo, Rio de Janeiro, Belo Horizonte, Curitiba, and Recife. On November 16, Minister Fernando Haddad answered the Senate's call and appeared for testimony, which lasted more than three hours. He proposed holding more than one edition of Enem per year, which he said would increase the number of companies taking part in the process, reduce the number of applicants, and mitigate the risk of errors.

The minister said that the 2010 timetable would be maintained with the release of grades in January 2011 and that students who had been affected would take a new test on a date yet to be set. Haddad did not absolve Inep of responsibility, but described Enem as a modern alternative to traditional entrance exams and highlighted its potential advantages. He also said that the printing companies contracted in 2009 and 2010, Plural and RR Donnelley Moore, were among the few in the country capable of meeting Enem's printing demands.

Haddad also stated that the Enem could be valid for more than one year and that students who were affected in 2010 could be compensated. On November 17, the minister appeared before the Chamber of Deputies for another round of explanations. According to him, the Federal Police cross-check the candidates' data with that of the room inspectors to see if they are related. As well as repeating his statements from the previous day, he mentioned that the United Nations Organization had issued a technical note endorsing the general methodology used in constructing the Enem.

== Conclusion of the situation ==
On December 15, the students retook the humanities and natural sciences exams. No errors in the booklets were reported. However, there was a 50 percent abstention rate among the 9,500 students, which was higher than expected by the MEC. Many complained that it was a working day (Wednesday), which forced them to miss it. The high drop-out rate may have been influenced by candidates who felt they were not significantly disadvantaged by the previous exam or who opted to focus on traditional university entrance exams. Some students didn't get a place and went to court to take the new exam.

On December 21, Inep released the test results. The candidates' grades were announced on January 14, 2011. After the announcement, many students reported that their grades for the second day of the tests, including the essay, were not published. Instead of the grades, a dash was displayed. They also reported that their attendance appeared as “annulled”. As a result, many students were unable to register for the Sistema de Seleção Unificada (SiSU). The MEC stated that these discrepancies occurred because the students had not correctly marked the color of their notebooks on the answer card.

More than seventeen thousand people from across the country (ten thousand on the first day and another seven thousand on the second) reported that their essays had been annulled and that their grades, particularly those from the second day, had not been published.

Verified by the MEC, the second day's marks were annulled for various reasons:

1. The participant's non-signature, in some cases;
2. Non-marking (or incorrect marking) of the color of the test booklet;
3. Candidate(s) who exceeded the time limit for the test.

Public defender Carlos Henrique Gondim, together with prosecutor Oscar Costa Filho, filed a new public civil action in the Federal Court of Ceará to suspend the release of the SiSU scores and allow students to appeal against the scores since several candidates questioned the accuracy of their released scores. In his opinion, the Ministry of Education should make the test mirrors available so that candidates can personally check their grades. Gondim argued that the lawsuit contested the lack of transparency in preventing exams from being viewed and appealed, which he claimed violated the constitutional principle of broad defense, as well as the principles of impersonality and justification of administrative acts.

In addition to the aforementioned issues, the SiSU computer system experienced failures, and Joaquim Soares Neto subsequently left his position as president of Inep. The system congestion led to issues with page loading and password recognition. In response, the MEC extended registration until January 20. Some students obtained a court order to have their essays reviewed. Separately, Malvina Tuttman, the new director of Inep, suggested that Enem could be applied more than once a year. Inep also allowed students to check the reason for the annulment of their exams on its official website. The number of SiSU applicants exceeded two million, highlighting the scale of the program despite the challenges faced.

On January 20, the Federal Court of Ceará granted an injunction for students to have access to the mirrors of their exams and to be able to file appeals within ten days. The decision was intended to apply nationwide, pending potential legal challenges or further clarification. The Federal Court in Rio de Janeiro also granted an injunction to extend registration for SiSU until January 26 in that state and the Public Prosecutor's Office asked for this injunction to be extended to the whole country. On the same day, the Federal Regional Court granted the request from the Federal Attorney General's Office so that the MEC would not have to extend registration in Rio de Janeiro.

On January 21, the Superior Court of Justice lifted all injunctions allowing access to the exam and extending registration for the SiSU. Minister Fernando Haddad stated that this measure was necessary to maintain the continuity of the process and avoid delays in the students' school calendar while acknowledging the challenges faced. The decision would be valid until the STJ judges the merits of the state decisions. In a press conference, Haddad attributed the registration difficulties to infrastructure limitations, citing peaks of up to 1,303 registrations per minute and a total of more than two million registrations, compared to a historical average of eight hundred thousand. The president of the Order of Attorneys of Brazil, Ophir Cavalcante, also expressed concerns about the actions of the Federal Public Prosecutor's Office, suggesting that they may have responded to student pressure, potentially contributing to uncertainties in the Enem process.

On January 23, the Ministry of Education released the list of those approved in the first SiSU call. 82,949 candidates were selected for 83 higher education institutions across the country. The number of successful candidates corresponded to a third of the number of Enem 2010 participants. The students were invited to register at the institutions, and the MEC announced that two additional calls would be conducted, contingent on the availability of spots after the initial registration period.

== See also ==
- Exame Nacional do Ensino Médio (Enem)
- Instituto Nacional de Estudos e Pesquisas Educacionais Anísio Teixeira (INEP)
- Sistema de Seleção Unificada (SiSU)
- Ministry of Education (Brazil)
