= List of international databases on individual student achievement tests =

This article contains a list of international databases on individual student achievement tests that can be used for psychometric research. In other words, this table only includes datasets containing items measuring ability and directly answered by students.

Database name	Discipline(s)	Country	Available years	Longitudinal/Cross-sectional	Cost	Access
Civic Education Study (CivEd)	Knowledge of democratic practices and institutions, as well as U.S. ninth-grade students’ attitudes toward democracy, national identity, international relations, and social cohesion and diversity	27 countries	1999	Cross-sectional	Free	Available through CD
Early Childhood Longitudinal Study, Kindergarten Class of 1998 - 99 (ECLS-K)	Mathematics, reading, general knowledge and science	27 countries	The birth cohort of the ECLS-B is a sample of children born in 2001 and followed from birth through kindergarten entry. The kindergarten class of 1998-99 cohort is a sample of children followed from kindergarten through the eighth grade. The kindergarten class of 2010-11 cohort will follow a sample of children from kindergarten through the fifth grade.	Longitudinal	Free	Data freely available but restricted data requiring an administrative process for access
Education Longitudinal Study of 2002	Mathematics	United States	2002, 2004, 2006, and 2012	Longitudinal	Free	Education Longitudinal Study of 2002
Exame Nacional de Desempenho de Estudantes (ENADE)	Administration, accounting, economics, journalism, marketing and advertising, design, law, psychology, international relations, administrative assistant, tourism, business management, human resources, financial management, operations, marketing, management	Brazil	2004-2011	Cross-sectional	Free	INEP
ENEM	Language, science, mathematics, humanities	Brazil	1998-2011	Cross-sectional	Free	INEP
NAEP	Arts, civics, economics, foreign language, geography, mathematics, reading, science, U.S. history, world history, writing, technology and engineering literacy (starting in 2014)	United States	1999, 2004, 2008, and 2012	Cross-sectional	Free	NAEP
National Longitudinal Study of 1972	Vocabulary, mathematics, reading, picture-number associations, letter groups, and mosaic comparisons	United States	1972-1973 (base years), follow-up surveys in 1973, 1974, 1976, 1979, and 1986	Longitudinal	Free	DAS
PIAAC	Literacy, numeracy, problem solving in technology-rich environments, and reading	24 participating countries	One collection between 2011 and 2012	Cross-sectional	Free	Data to be released between December 2013 and April 2014
PIRLS	Reading	more than 50 countries	2001, 2006	Cross-sectional	Free	NCES
PISA	Reading, mathematics and science, only one area being evaluated in each year.	Over 70 countries	2000, 2003, 2006, and 2009	Cross-sectional	Free	PISA
Sistema de Avaliação da Educação Básica (SAEB)	Language and mathematics	Brazil	1995, 1997, 1999, 2001, 2003, 2005, and 2011	Cross-sectional	Free	INEP
TIMSS	Mathematics and science	Over 60 countries	1995, 1999, 2003, 2007, and 2011	Cross-sectional	Free	NCES

== See also ==
- List of online databases
