= Fernando Haddad =

Brazilian politician and academic (born 1963)

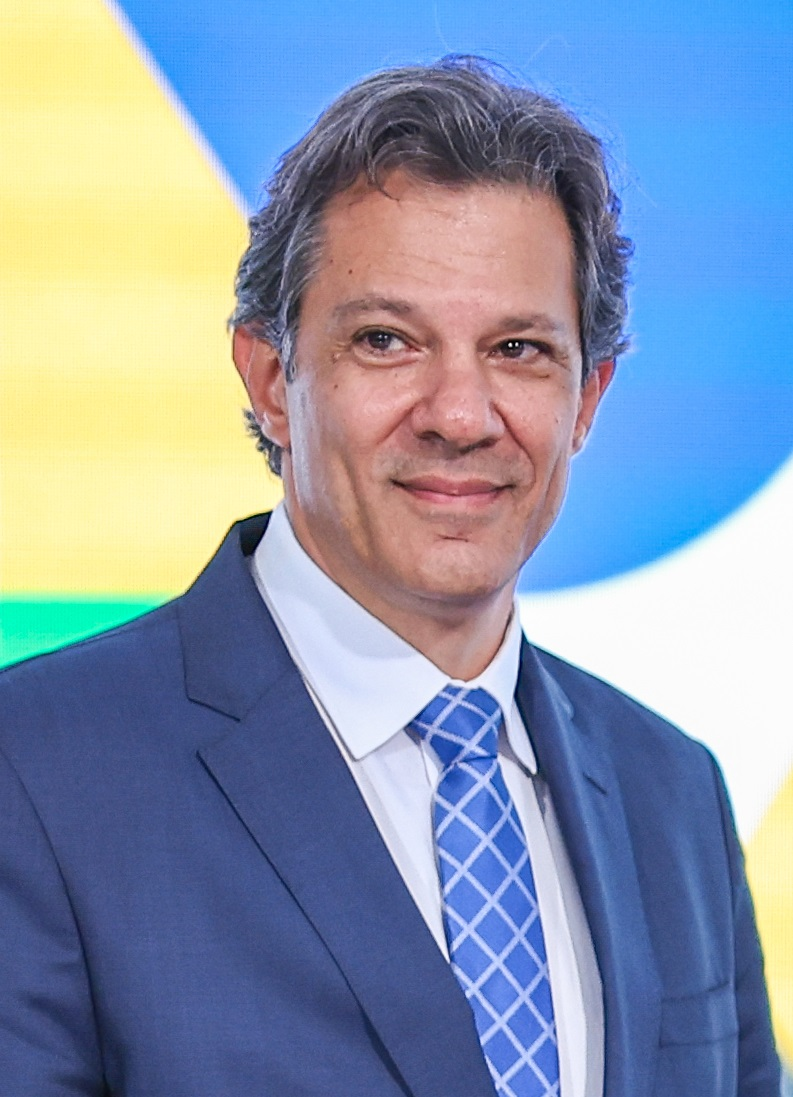
- Haddad in 2023

Minister of Finance
- In office 1 January 2023 – 20 March 2026
- President: Luiz Inácio Lula da Silva
- Preceded by: Paulo Guedes (Note: Guedes served as Minister of the Economy which also became Ministry of Planning and Budget under Simone Tebet and Ministry of Management and Innovation in Public Services under Esther Dweck under the Second cabinet of Lula da Silva.)
- Succeeded by: Dario Durigan

Mayor of São Paulo
- In office 1 January 2013 – 1 January 2017
- Vice Mayor: Nádia Campeão
- Preceded by: Gilberto Kassab
- Succeeded by: João Doria

Minister of Education
- In office 29 July 2005 – 24 January 2012
- President: Luiz Inácio Lula da Silva; Dilma Rousseff
- Preceded by: Tarso Genro
- Succeeded by: Aloizio Mercadante

Personal details
- Born: 25 January 1963 (age 63) São Paulo, Brazil
- Party: PT (since 1983)
- Spouse: Ana Estela Haddad (m. 1988)
- Children: 2
- Education: University of São Paulo (LL.B., M.Ec, Ph.D.)

Fernando Haddad (Brazilian Portuguese: [feʁˈnɐ̃du aˈdadʒi]; born 25 January 1963) is a Brazilian academic, lawyer and politician who served as the Brazilian Minister of Finance from 2023 to 2026. He was previously the mayor of São Paulo from 2013 to 2017 and the Brazilian minister of education from 2005 to 2012 in the cabinets of Luiz Inácio Lula da Silva and Dilma Rousseff.

Haddad is a professor of political science at the University of São Paulo (USP), from which he graduated with a bachelor's degree in law, a master's degree in economics and a doctorate in philosophy. He also worked as an investment analyst at Unibanco. Between 2001 and 2003, he served as the Undersecretary of Finance and Economic Development for São Paulo, during Marta Suplicy's administration. He also held a position within the Ministry of Planning during the Lula government, under the administration of Guido Mantega (2003-2004), during which time he authored the bill that established public-private partnerships (PPPs) in Brazil.

He was appointed the Minister of Education in July 2005 by President Luiz Inácio Lula da Silva and held the position until January 2012. During his tenure as minister, significant educational initiatives were introduced, including the Institutional Teaching Initiation Scholarship Programme (PIBID) and the Unified Selection System (SiSU). Additionally, the Open University of Brazil and the Federal Institute of Education, Science and Technology were established. Notably, he played a key role in implementing the University for All Programme (ProUni) and spearheading the reformulation and expansion of the Higher Education Student Financing Fund (FIES) along with the Exame Nacional do Ensino Médio.

In 2012, he was elected mayor of São Paulo after defeating candidate José Serra in the runoff. During his tenure (2013–2016), his administration focused on expanding public transportation and bike infrastructure, improving road safety through lower speed limits, and promoting social and cultural initiatives, alongside efforts to reform the city’s tax system; however, he faced political resistance and public criticism, and lost the 2016 mayoral election to João Doria in the first round.

He was the Workers' Party candidate for President of Brazil in the 2018 election, replacing former president Luiz Inácio Lula da Silva, whose candidacy was barred by the Superior Electoral Court under the Clean Slate law. Haddad faced far-right candidate Jair Bolsonaro in the run-off of the election, and lost the election with 44.87% of the votes against Bolsonaro's 55.13%. In 2022, he ran for governor of the state of São Paulo. Despite achieving the best performance for the Workers’ Party in the state, he lost the election in the runoff to Tarcísio de Freitas. In December 2022, then president-elect Lula announced Haddad as his Minister of Finance.

On 19 March 2026, Haddad announced that he would step down as Minister and run in the 2026 São Paulo gubernatorial election.

== Early life and career ==
Haddad was born in São Paulo, the second of three children of salesman Khalil Haddad (1923-2008), a Melkite Catholic immigrant from Lebanon who emigrated to Brazil in 1948. His mother, Norma Teresa Goussain (1938-2023), was born in São Paulo into a Lebanese family.

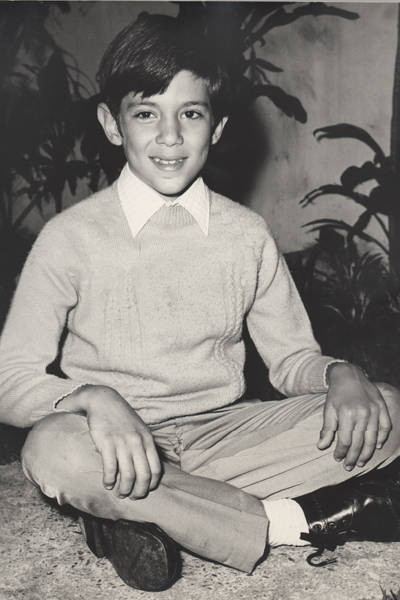
Haddad as a child

Haddad attended high school at Colégio Bandeirantes, and in 1981 entered the Law School of the University of São Paulo as an undergraduate. He studied law, economics and philosophy at the University of São Paulo. Haddad holds a master's degree in economics and a Doctorate in Philosophy from the University of São Paulo. His Master's dissertation was on socio-economic aspects of the Soviet Union, defended in 1990, whereas his doctorate thesis is concerned with historical materialism, defended in 1996.

Haddad began his career as an investment analyst at Unibanco, but has devoted much of his career to public service. Haddad has been a consultant for the Fundação Instituto de Pesquisas Econômicas, an economics research institute, based at the School of Economics, Business and Accounting of the University of São Paulo, chief of staff to the Finance and Economic Development Secretary of the municipality of São Paulo, and a special advisor to the Ministry of Planning, Budget and Management.

Haddad is a professor in the political science department of the University of São Paulo.

== Career ==
=== Minister of Education ===
Haddad took over the cabinet position of Minister of Education on 29 July 2005, when his predecessor, Tarso Genro, left the position to become the chairman of the Workers' Party. In 2007, Haddad established the Basic Education Development Index (IDEB) to measure the quality of public primary and middle schools. Under Haddad's tenure as minister, the Lula administration implemented the University for Everyone Program (ProUni), which aims at offering scholarships for low-income students attending private universities. The Ministry also made several reforms to the National High School Exam (ENEM) so as to amplify its usage in university admissions. In 2009 Haddad's ministry became embroiled in controversy after that year's ENEM leaked, which forced the government to cancel the exam scheduled for October.

=== Mayor of São Paulo ===
During the 2012 municipal elections, Haddad was a candidate for Mayor of São Paulo. After successfully advancing to the second round, he faced former mayor José Serra (who had received the most votes in the first round) and won with 55.57% of the valid votes. As Mayor, Haddad implemented an expansion of the city's network of bike lanes, promising to extend it from 64.7 km to 400 km in 2016. The project sparked polarized reactions by residents of São Paulo.

In June 2013, his administration faced widespread demonstrations, when São Paulo city hall and the government of the state of São Paulo (which runs the train and metro system of São Paulo) announced that bus fares would be raised from R$3.00 to R$3.20. The violent repression of these protests by the São Paulo state police generated a widespread reaction by the general population. The resulting 2013 protests were the second biggest movement in comparison with 2015 protests against President Dilma Rousseff.

In July 2016, Haddad had the approval of only 14% of city residents, the lowest for the end of a mayoral term since Celso Pitta in 2000. On 2 October 2016, Haddad lost his bid for re-election to Brazilian Social Democracy Party candidate João Doria, receiving only 17% of the vote. He left office on 1 January 2017.

In 2022, Haddad ran for governor of São Paulo with his running mate former first lady Lúcia França, against Tarcísio de Freitas, a minister in the Bolsonaro administration. Haddad lost the election in the second round, winning 44.73% of the vote to Tarcísio's 55.27%.

=== Minister of Finance ===
After his election loss in São Paulo, Haddad was appointed Minister of Finance by fellow party member President Luiz Inácio Lula da Silva, following his victory in the 2022 presidential election.

==== New Fiscal Framework ====
Due to the provision included in the Transition constitutional amendment proposal, the government needed to submit to the National Congress a new fiscal framework to replace the spending ceiling, Haddad soon presented the proposal to the congress, which was accepted on August 22. With the new law coming into effect, it established a floor and ceiling for the real growth of tax expenditures of 0.6% and 2.5% respectively; Investments now also have a minimum correction floor at the level of inflation; Furthermore, growth in fiscal spending is limited to 70% of the growth in government revenues of the previous year; The new framework also determines the application of gradual spending containment triggers in the case where the government is systematically unable to meet fiscal targets.

With approval, the government said it hoped to be able to eliminate the primary deficit in 2024 and obtain surpluses of 0.5% and 1% of GDP in 2025 and 2026, respectively; The expectations were seen with skepticism not only by the market, but also by members of the government itself and parliamentarians.

==== "Desenrola Brasil" program ====
In July 2023, the Haddad launched the first phase of the "Emergency Debt Renegotiation Program for Indebted Individuals" program (popularly known as the "Desenrola Brasil" program), a debt renegotiation program which was divided into two phases. In October of the same year, the second phase, in which non-bank debts were renegotiated, was launched.

The program is made up of four "participants" (the federal government, debtors, creditors (such as financial institutions, public utility services, retail companies, service providers in general, including individual microentrepreneurs and small businesses), and financial agents, such as banks) and has the stated objective of reducing debt among the population (especially the low income and middle classes), as well as facilitating access to credit by the general population.

==== Tax Reform ====
For the first time since the redemocratization in Brazil (over 30 years ago), a tributary reform was approved in congress; Among its main points is the exemption from taxes for basic food products, as well as the creation of the VAT (Value Added Tax) and the "selective tax", (or "sin tax", a tax on items considered harmful to public health and the environment). Medicine, vegetables, medical devices, among other goods, will also be exempt from VAT charges, while other products such as speedboats, jets and yachts will become susceptible to IPVA charges. The reform also creates progressive taxation on inheritances, which received mild criticism from some sectors of the society.

The National Congress enacted the reform on 20 December 2023, in a solemn session attended by the three heads of the republic's powers (executive, legislative and judiciary), as well as ministers Fernando Haddad, from the finance ministry, and Simone Tebet, from the planning ministry; Senate President Rodrigo Pacheco described the promulgation of the reform as "not only a historic milestone, but also a turning point" and claimed that this would "change Brazil's trajectory". After the approval of the reform, the risk rating agency S&P Global Ratings raised Brazil's credit rating and highlighted "better prospects for economic growth".

==== Minimum wage and income tax reforms ====
On 16 February, Lula increased the value of the minimum wage from 1,302 reals to 1,320 reals, correcting it above inflation. In December, there was another increase on the minimum wage, going from 1,320 to 1,412 reals, the increase became effective on 1 January 2024. According to Lula, these actions are the result of a new "minimum wage valorization" project idealized by him, which will adjust the minimum wage over inflation every year, as a way to keep up with the price changes for basic products.

In early 2023, there was also an increase in the exemption from Income tax to 2,640 reals, compared to the previous amount of 1,900 reals. In February 2024, continuing the increase in income tax exemption, Lula issued a provisional measure that exempts those who receive up to 2,824 reais from payment (equivalent to two minimum wages per month).

==== Continuous 3% Inflation Target ====
Haddad was a defender of the idea of setting the inflation target at 3% year on year, defying the will of other members of the government, including President Lula himself, to raise the target to 4%. In addition, he defended the idea that the target should be pursued continuously throughout the accumulated 12 months, instead of the calendar year. After some debate, Lula signed a decree establishing a continuous inflation target starting in 2025, with quarterly accountability by the central bank. The decree empowers the National Monetary Council (CMN), the country's top economic policy body, to determine the target. In a subsequent meeting on Wednesday, the CMN confirmed the 3% official goal, with a tolerance range of plus or minus 1.5 percentage points.

Haddad, who is a member of the CMN along with the planning minister and the central bank governor, told reporters that the new system effectively frees the government from setting the official goal annually and, along with the government's fiscal rules, "establishes a new macroeconomic horizon for Brazil." Until now, the CMN had set annual inflation targets to meet each calendar year. But Lula's economic team advocates that pursuing inflation targets within a continuous timeframe allows a longer-term approach that provides more room to accommodate price shocks without requiring monetary tightening.

According to the decree, starting in January 2025, the target will be considered missed if annual inflation deviates for six consecutive months from the range of the respective tolerance interval. In such cases, the central bank will issue an open letter to the finance minister explaining the reasons, necessary measures to bring inflation back to target, and the expected timeline for their effectiveness. The decree also mandates the central bank to begin publishing a quarterly monetary policy report, "which will include the performance of the new inflation target framework, the results of past monetary policy decisions, and the prospective assessment of inflation."

== 2018 presidential election ==
Haddad was announced as Lula da Silva's running mate in the 2018 presidential election in August 2018. However, the Superior Electoral Court ruled on 31 August that the former president is ineligible for candidacy due to his being disqualified under the Clean Slate law, which bans people convicted on appeal from running for public office. Lula had been arrested in April after his conviction for corruption was upheld by the Federal Court of the Fourth Region. On 11 September 2018, Haddad was named by the Workers' Party as Lula's replacement, with Communist Party legislator Manuela d'Ávila taking Haddad's place as the vice presidential candidate.

Haddad came in second place in the first round of the election with 29% of the vote, behind Jair Bolsonaro, who had 46%. The two faced again in the run-off on 28 October 2018, in which Haddad placed second with 44.87% of the vote against Bolsonaro, who won the election.

== Other activities ==
- World Bank, ex-officio member of the board of governors (since 2023)

== Personal life ==
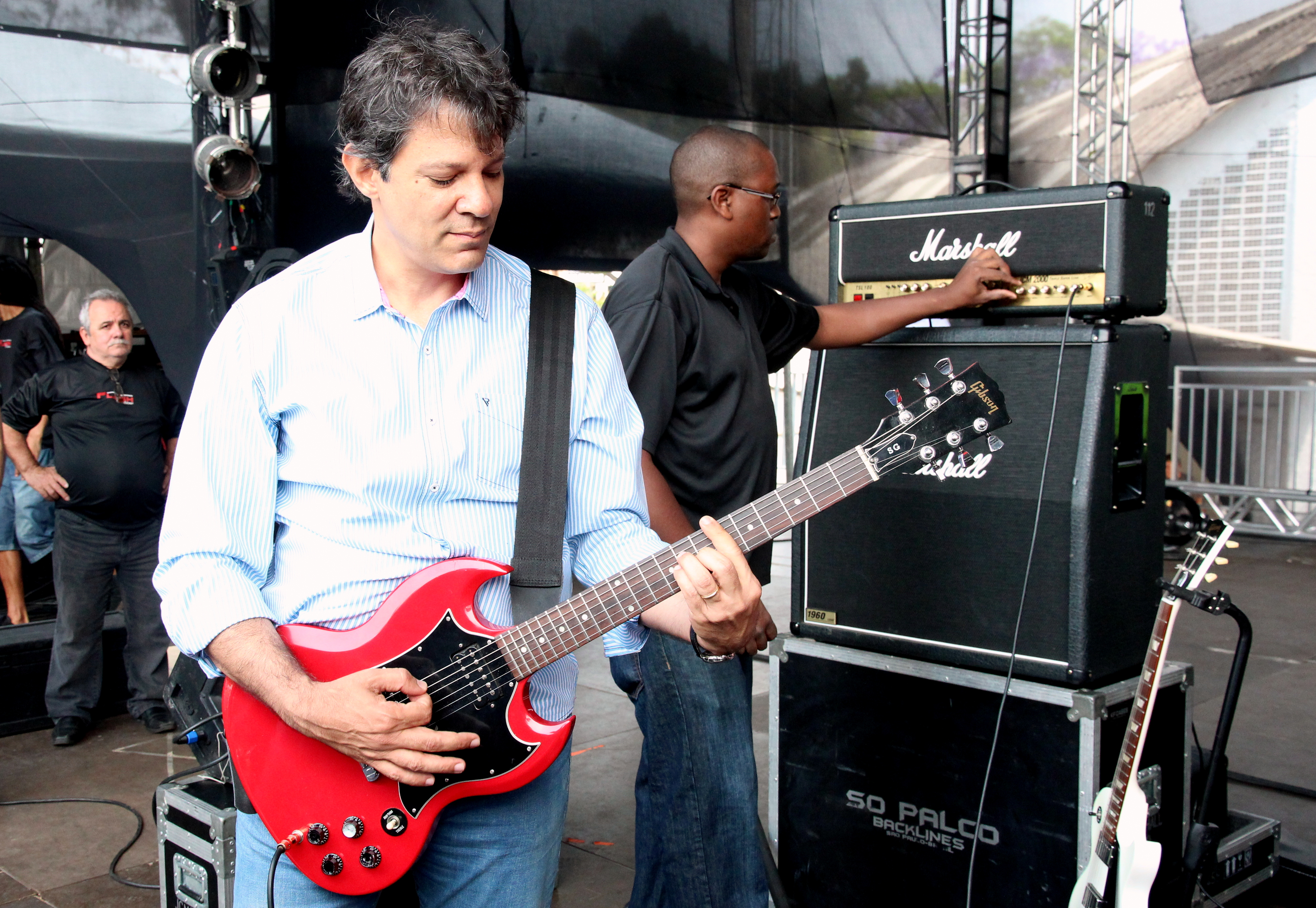
Haddad with his SG Gibson guitar

Haddad belongs to the Greek Orthodox Church of Antioch.

During his mandate as mayor of São Paulo, he was nicknamed "Jaiminho" by Brazilian historian and radio host Marco Antonio Villa, an outspoken critic of Haddad's Workers' Party. Jaiminho is a reference to a character in Mexican sitcom El Chavo del Ocho, popular in Brazil.

Haddad is an amateur guitar player and is occasionally seen in public gatherings with his trademark SG Gibson guitar. He is a São Paulo FC fan.

== Electoral history ==
Year	Election	Party	Office	Coalition	Partners	Party	Votes	Percent	Result
2012	Municipal Election of São Paulo	PT	Mayor	To Change and Renovate São Paulo (PT, PCdoB, PP, PSB)	Nádia Campeão	PCdoB	1,776,317	28.98%	Runoff
2012	Municipal Election of São Paulo	PT	Mayor	To Change and Renovate São Paulo (PT, PCdoB, PP, PSB)	Nádia Campeão	PCdoB	3,387,720	55.57%	Elected
2016	Municipal Election of São Paulo	PT	Mayor	More São Paulo (PT, PCdoB, PR, PDT, PROS)	Nádia Campeão	PCdoB	967,190	16.70%	Not elected
2018	Presidential Election	PT	President	The People Happy Again (PT, PROS, PCdoB)	Manuela d'Ávila	PCdoB	31,342,051	29.28%	Runoff
2018	Presidential Election	PT	President	The People Happy Again (PT, PROS, PCdoB)	Manuela d'Ávila	PCdoB	47,040,906	44.87%	Not elected
2022	State Elections of São Paulo	PT	Governor	Together for São Paulo (PT, PCdoB, PV, PSOL, REDE, PSB, AGIR)	Lúcia França	PSB	8,337,139	35.70%	Runoff
2022	State Elections of São Paulo	PT	Governor	Together for São Paulo (PT, PCdoB, PV, PSOL, REDE, PSB, AGIR)	Lúcia França	PSB	10,908,972	44.73%	Not elected
2026	State Elections of São Paulo	PT	Governor	Wake Up São Paulo (PT, PCdoB, PV, PSB, PDT, PSOL, REDE)	Márcio França	PSB	8,423,656	36.42%	Not elected

== Bibliography ==
Academic publications of Dr. Fernando Haddad include:

Year	Portuguese title	English translation
1992	O Sistema Soviético – Relato de Uma Polêmica	The Soviet System – Report of a Polemic
1996	De Marx a Habermas – O Materialismo Histórico e seu Paradigma Adequado	From Marx to Habermas – Historical Materialism and Its Proper Paradigm
1998	Em Defesa do Socialismo	In Defense of Socialism
1998	Sindicatos, Cooperativas e Socialismo	Unions, Cooperatives and Socialism
1998	Teses sobre Karl Marx	Theses on Karl Marx
2001	Rumo à redialectização do materialismo histórico	Toward the redialectization of historical materialism
2004	Trabalho e Linguagem para a Renovação do Socialismo	Work and Language for the Renewal of Socialism
2022	O Terceiro Excluído: Contribuição para uma antropologia dialética	The Excluded Middle: A Contribution to a Dialectical Anthropology
2026	Capitalismo Superindustrial: Caminhos diversos, destino comum	Superindustrial Capitalism: Diverse Paths, a Common Destiny

== Notes ==
Political offices
Preceded by Tarso Genro	Minister of Education; 2005–2012	Succeeded by Aloizio Mercadante
Preceded by Gilberto Kassab	Mayor of São Paulo; 2013–2017	Succeeded by João Doria
Preceded by Paulo Guedes	Minister of Finance; 2023–2026	Succeeded by Dario Durigan
Party political offices
Preceded by Marta Suplicy	PT nominee for Mayor of São Paulo; 2012, 2016	Succeeded by Jilmar Tatto
Preceded by Dilma Rousseff	PT nominee for President of Brazil; 2018	Succeeded by Luiz Inácio Lula da Silva
Preceded by Luiz Marinho	PT nominee for Governor of São Paulo; 2022, 2026	Most recent
