= Pontifical Catholic University of Goiás =

Private research university in Goiânia, Brazil

- Pontifícia Universidade Católica de Goiás
- Other names: PUC-Goiás
- Motto: Veritas, in scientia et fide (in English: Truth, in Science and in belief)
- Type: Private, non-profit
- Established: October 17, 1959
- Affiliations: Roman Catholic Church
- Chancellor: Washington Cruz, C.P.
- Rector: Wolmir Therezio Amado
- Vice rector: Olga Izilda Ronchi
- Students: 25,000
- Location: Goiânia and Ipameri, Goiás, Brazil; 16°40′41″S 49°14′38″W
- Campus: Urban
- Colors: Grey and yellow
- Website: www.pucgoias.edu.br

The Pontifical Catholic University of Goiás (Portuguese: Pontifícia Universidade Católica de Goiás, PUC-Goiás) is a private and non-profit Pontifical catholic university, located in Goiânia (headquarters) and Ipameri, is the first university of the State of Goiás. It is maintained by the Catholic Archdiocese of Goiânia.

Founded on October 19, 1961, by the Sociedade Goiana de Cultura, a non-profit foundation maintained by the Catholic Archdiocese of Goiânia, PUC Goiás is the oldest higher education institution of the state and of the Central-Western region, preceding by two months the foundation of UFG. According to INEP.

== History ==
In 1948, Dom Emmanuel Gomes de Oliveira, then Archbishop of Goiânia, had the idea of creating the first university of the Central-Western Brazil. Later that year, the Philosophy College was launched as the first higher education institution of the region, offering degrees in history, geography, Portuguese, and teaching. The Colleges of Economics was founded in 1951, and Law in 1959, in addition to the higher education schools of Fine Arts (1952), Nursing (1954), Social Service (1957), and Social and Economic Studies.

In 1958, the Sociedade Goiana de Cultura was created to maintain these colleges and schools, which were gathered into the Universidade de Goiás, later renamed Universidade Católica de Goiás and recently recognized by the Holy See as a University of Pontifical Right, becoming PUC Goiás.

According to the latest results of the General Index of Courses uncovered by the National Institute of Studies and Research on Education (Instituto Nacional de Estudos e Pesquisas Educacionais - INEP), linked to the Ministry of Education, PUC Goiás is the second best university in the state of Goiás, behind only UFG and ahead of UEG.

== Infrastructure ==
PUC Goiás has five campuses, four of them in Goiânia, the state capital, and another in the municipality of Ipameri. The university also has a library with over 213,000 books, a school of foreign languages, a local television network (PUC-TV), four research institutes, over 400 laboratories, two school-clinics and two museums.

== Campuses ==
- Campus I - Setor Universitário, Goiânia
  - Area I: Rua 226, Rua 235, and 5ª Avenida
  - Area II: Praça Universitária, 1ª Avenida, and Rua 240
  - Area III: Praça Universitária, 1ª Avenida, and Av. Universitária
  - Area IV: Praça Universitária, 1ª Avenida, and Rua 235
  - Area V: Rua 232
- Campus II: Estrada Santa Rita, km 2, Jardim Olímpico, Goiânia
- Campus III: Rua Colônia, Jardim Novo Mundo, Goiânia
- Campus IV: Avenida Vereador José Benevenuto Filho, Setor Universitário, Ipameri
- Campus V: Avenida Fued José Sebba, Jardim Goiás, Goiânia
