= Exame Nacional do Ensino Médio =

Standardized Brazilian national exam

- Acronym: Enem
- Type: Paper/digital-based standardized test
- Administrator: National Institute for Educational Studies and Research "Anísio Teixeira" (INEP)
- Skills tested: Portuguese language Literature; Foreign Language (English or Spanish); Arts; Physical Education; History; Geography; Philosophy; Sociology; Essay; Biology; Physics; Chemistry; Mathematics
- Year started: 1998
- Duration: 10 hours and 30 minutes over 2 days
- Offered: 1 time per year
- Regions: Brazil
- Languages: Portuguese
- Website: enem.inep.gov.br

Exame Nacional do Ensino Médio (Brazilian Portuguese pronunciation: [eˈzɐmi nasi.oˈnaw du ẽˈsinu ˈmɛdʒi.u, - nasjoˈnaw -]; English: National High School Exam), shortened as Enem (Brazilian Portuguese: [eˈnẽj]), is a non-mandatory, standardized Brazilian national exam, which evaluates high school students in Brazil. The ENEM is the most important exam of this kind in Brazil, with more than 8.6 million registered candidates in 2016. It is the second largest in the world after China's National Higher Education Entrance Examination.

Initially conceived as a diagnostic test, ENEM began to be used as a means of access to public universities in 2004, following the enactment of the University for All Program (Programa Universidade para Todos, or ProUni) under Luiz Inácio Lula da Silva’s administration. In January 2010, the Unified Selection System (Sistema de Seleção Unificada, or SISU) was launched by MEC, allowing students to apply for admission to federal and state institutions using their ENEM scores.

By 2014, ENEM had become the largest university entrance examination in Brazil, with approximately eight million registered candidates, and the second-largest in the world, surpassed only by China's Gaokao. The test is often compared to other national qualification systems, such as France's Baccalauréat, Germany's Abitur, the United Kingdom's A Levels (and Highers in Scotland), Spain's Selectividad, Portugal's IAVE exams, Japan's Daigaku Nyūshi Center Shiken, South Korea's Suneung, and the SAT and ACT in the United States.

ENEM is also used by applicants seeking scholarships at private universities through ProUni or student loans via the Student Financing Fund (Fundo de Financiamento Estudantil, FIES). Between 2009 and 2016, the exam served as an alternative route to obtain a high school diploma for those enrolled in adult education programs, replacing the National Examination for the Certification of Youth and Adult Competencies (Exame Nacional para Certificação de Competências de Jovens e Adultos, Encceja), which was reinstated in 2017. In several universities, the exam has gradually replaced the traditional vestibular as the main form of admission.

Despite its role in expanding access to higher education, ENEM has faced several controversies. The 2009 edition was canceled following a leak of the test. In 2010, a printing error affected thousands of candidates. In 2019, technical inconsistencies led to errors in score calculation, while in 2021, mass resignations of INEP staff occurred amid accusations of ideological interference and prior censorship in test questions.

== History ==
The ENEM was created in 1998 during the tenure of Education Minister Paulo Renato Souza, under the administration of Fernando Henrique Cardoso. Its initial purpose was to annually assess the learning outcomes of high school students across Brazil, providing data to the Ministry of Education for the formulation of public policies aimed at improving the quality of national education. The exam was designed in alignment with the National Curriculum Parameters (Parâmetros Curriculares Nacionais, or PCNs) for both elementary and secondary education, allowing adjustments based on data collected from ENEM results. It was the first large-scale assessment initiative of the Brazilian education system. Another goal of ENEM was to encourage changes in secondary school curricula. To achieve this, its importance was gradually expanded: by its second edition, the test was already being used as an alternative form of admission by 93 higher education institutions.

The original version of the exam, used between 1998 and 2008, consisted of 63 questions administered over a single day. Starting in 2004, ENEM scores began to be accepted by private colleges and universities participating in the University for All Program (Programa Universidade para Todos, or ProUni), allowing students to compete for scholarships at private institutions.

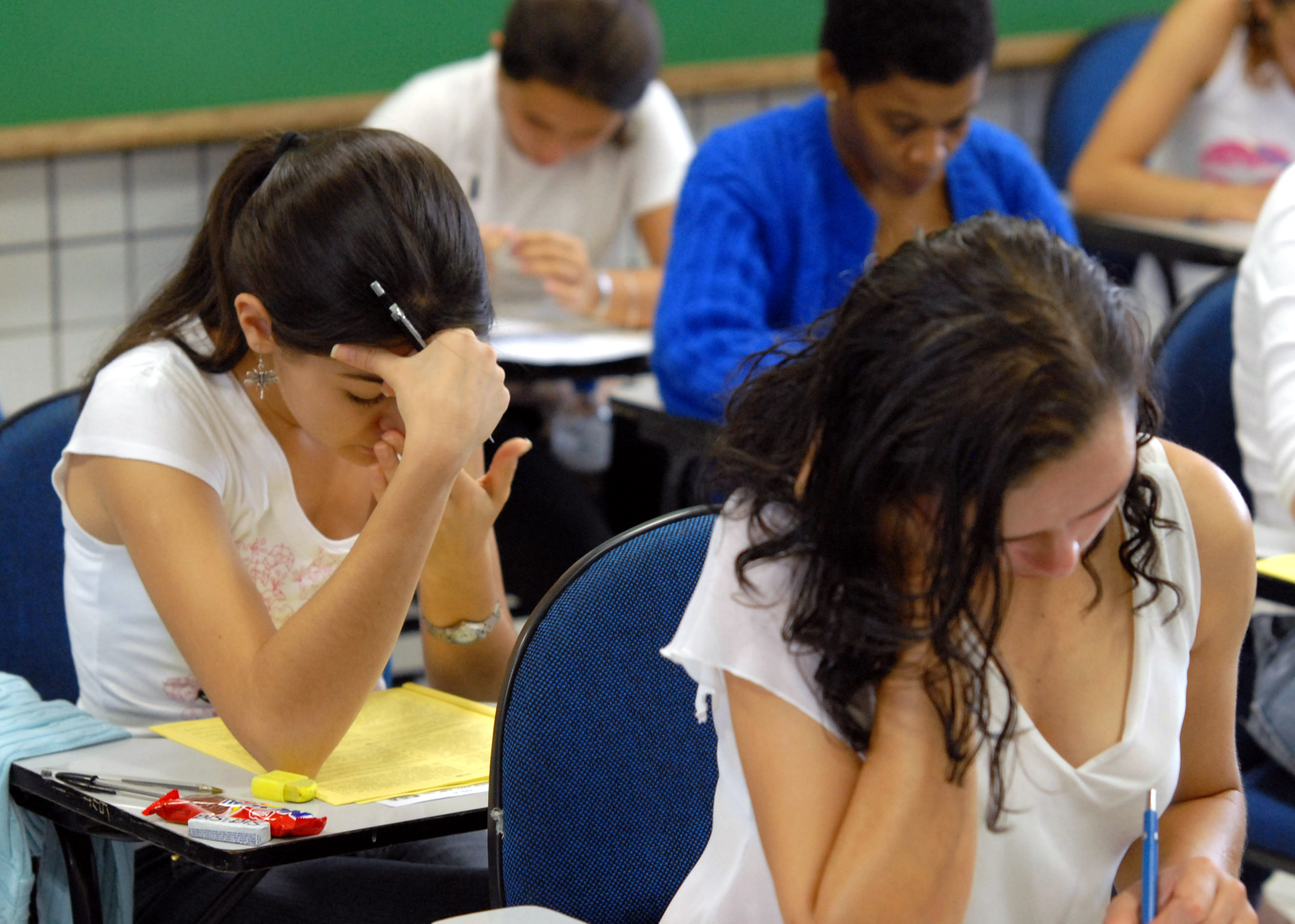
Participants of the Exame Nacional do Ensino Médio (ENEM) in Brasília, 2007, during the exam's original single-day format.

In 2009, during the tenure of Education Minister Fernando Haddad under President Luiz Inácio Lula da Silva, a new version of the exam was introduced with the objective of unifying the entrance process for Brazil's federal universities. The new format extended the test to two days and expanded it to 180 multiple-choice questions and one essay prompt. Additionally, the Item response theory (IRT) was adopted to calculate scores, allowing comparison of results from different editions and enabling their use for university admission. The implementation of the new model was led by Professor Dr. Heliton Tavares, Director of the National Institute for Educational Studies and Research Anísio Teixeira (INEP) and one of Brazil's leading experts in Educational Assessment and IRT.

Plans for ENEM's expansion also included offering the exam at least twice a year beginning in 2012 and establishing regional testing centers across the country, particularly within federal institutions, where candidates could schedule their exams. This proposal required a large pool of pre-calibrated test items, adjusted according to the IRT scale, to ensure the comparability of results.

The second version of ENEM faced criticism regarding the grading of the essay component. In response, in 2012 the Ministry of Education revised the essay evaluation criteria, reducing the score discrepancy required between the two initial evaluators for a third grader to be called in for review.

== Editions ==
Year	Number of candidates (confirmed)
2025	4,811,338
2024	4,325,960
2023	3,933,970
2022	3,409,682
2021	4,004,764
2020	5,783,357
2019	5,095,308
2018	5,513,662
2017	6,731,186
2016	8,627,371
2015	7,792,025
2014	8,722,290
2013	7,173,574
2012	5,791,332
2011	5,380,857
2010	4,626,094
2009	4,148,721
2008	4,018,070
2007	3,568,592
2006	3,742,827
2005	3,004,491
2004	1,552,316
2003	1,882,393
2002	1,829,170
2001	1,624,131
2000	390,180
1999	346,819
1998	157,221

=== 2009 ===
Due to strong suspicions of a test leak, in which exam booklets were stolen from one of the printing companies responsible for producing them, the test — originally scheduled to be held in October 2009 — was postponed. With new dates set for December 5 and 6, 2009, of the total 4.1 million registered candidates, 37.7% failed to attend the first day of testing. Since becoming the main exam for admission to higher education institutions, Enem has faced several problems that have generated distrust and concern among students. The first issue was the theft of test materials in 2009, which led to the postponement of the exam. Later, the official answer key was released with errors.

=== 2010 ===
In 2010, confidential and personal information from Enem applicants was leaked online. Immediately after the 2010 Enem took place, a series of errors in one of the test booklets led the Federal Court of Ceará to suspend the exam nationwide. The Ministry of Education intended to reapply the test for all affected students, but the court argued that holding new exams only for those who received the incorrect booklets could harm all other participants. Due to this entire controversy, some educational institutions decided to withdraw from using Enem scores as part of their admission process.

The Minister of Education, Fernando Haddad, announced that a second round of tests would be given to students affected by printing errors found in 0.3% of the 10 million printed exams—errors that were acknowledged by the printing company RR Donnelley, the largest printing company in the world. Of the 33,000 flawed booklets, 21,000 were actually distributed. RR Donnelley stated that this failure rate was within the acceptable margin of error for that type of industrial process. The new Enem exams were scheduled to take place during the first half of December, according to the Ministry of Education.

=== 2011 ===
In 2011, the Enem once again faced controversy due to the leak of test questions prior to the exam. According to reports, one of the mock tests used by a private school in Fortaleza contained questions identical to those on the official Enem test, leading the Ministry of Education to acknowledge that part of the exam had been compromised.

The Federal Court in Ceará later decided that all students from the school involved should have their Enem scores annulled and be offered a new version of the test, as they had gained prior access to restricted content.

This incident reignited public criticism and debates about the security and reliability of the exam, as similar problems had already occurred in previous years. Despite the controversies, Enem continued to expand its role as the main standardized test for admission to higher education in Brazil.

=== 2012 ===
In the 2012 edition of the exam, a record number of 5,790,989 candidates had their registration confirmed to take part in the test. It was the largest edition up to that point. The exams were held on November 3 and 4, with the answer keys released on November 7 and the final results on December 28. The new security and correction procedures to prevent possible fraud cost the federal government R$ 266 million, with a per-student cost of R$ 46, according to Inep. Electronic seals were used to close the suitcases containing the test materials.

It is estimated that the exam was applied in 15,076 testing locations across 1,615 municipalities in all regions of Brazil. In January 2013, the Federal Court in Rio Grande do Sul temporarily suspended the Sisu system.

Several inconsistencies in essay grading generated distrust among candidates regarding the evaluation process. A case that drew public attention involved a candidate who included a ramen noodle recipe in his essay and still received 560 points, causing widespread disbelief among students who claimed to have written better essays for equal or lower scores.

=== 2013 ===
The Ministry of Education recorded another milestone with 7,173,574 registered candidates. That same year, a court injunction temporarily guaranteed students access to copies of their essay grading sheets. Soon after, the injunction was overturned, as the responsible prosecutor stated that it would be logistically impossible to provide essay copies to all candidates in that edition. Regarding security, as in the previous year, the exam envelopes used electronic seals and were stored in a Brazilian Army facility in São Paulo.

On the exam days, no major incidents were reported, but the Ministry of Education identified several cases of students posting photos and comments on social networks from inside the test locations — an action strictly prohibited. As a result, 36 candidates were immediately disqualified from the exam, according to MEC, which monitored social media in real time during the tests. In total, 1,522 candidates were disqualified from the exam.

=== 2014 ===
According to data from the Ministry of Education, the year 2014 set a new record for the number of Enem registrations, reaching 9,519,827 students, representing an increase of 21.8% compared to the previous year. However, of this total, 8,721,946 registrations were confirmed, and 6,193,565 candidates took the exams — about 71% of all registered participants. After the results were published, this edition was marked by low average performance, with only 2.1 million candidates scoring above 4.5, and 529,374 candidates receiving a zero score on the essay (8.5% of total participants). A total of 1,519 candidates were eliminated from the exam.

=== 2015 ===
In 2015, there were 7,746,436 registered candidates, with an absence rate of 25.5%. A total of 743 people were eliminated from the test — most due to the use of unauthorized devices, 63 detected by metal detectors, and only three for posting photos from inside the test room. Compared to previous years, the number of eliminated candidates dropped significantly, which, according to Education Minister Mercadante, indicated a growing “culture of respect for the rules.” Participants who were unable to take the test due to medical incidents, power outages, or errors by the exam team were allowed to retake the test. Approximately 529,000 candidates scored zero on the essay. The exam included questions on philosophers such as Simone de Beauvoir, Max Weber, Nietzsche, and Paulo Freire, and the essay theme was “The persistence of violence against women in Brazilian society.”

=== 2016 ===
On April 5, 2016, the federal government launched Hora do Enem, a free online platform designed to help students prepare for the test through simulations, video lessons, and support materials, in partnership with teachers from the TV Escola network. A total of 5,848,619 candidates took the exams over two days. The absence rate was 30%, and 768 candidates were eliminated for irregularities. Among them, 641 were disqualified for “general rule violations,” such as using non-transparent pens or arriving late. 120 candidates were caught by metal detectors, and seven were removed for refusing to undergo biometric verification, a new feature introduced that year.

=== 2017 ===
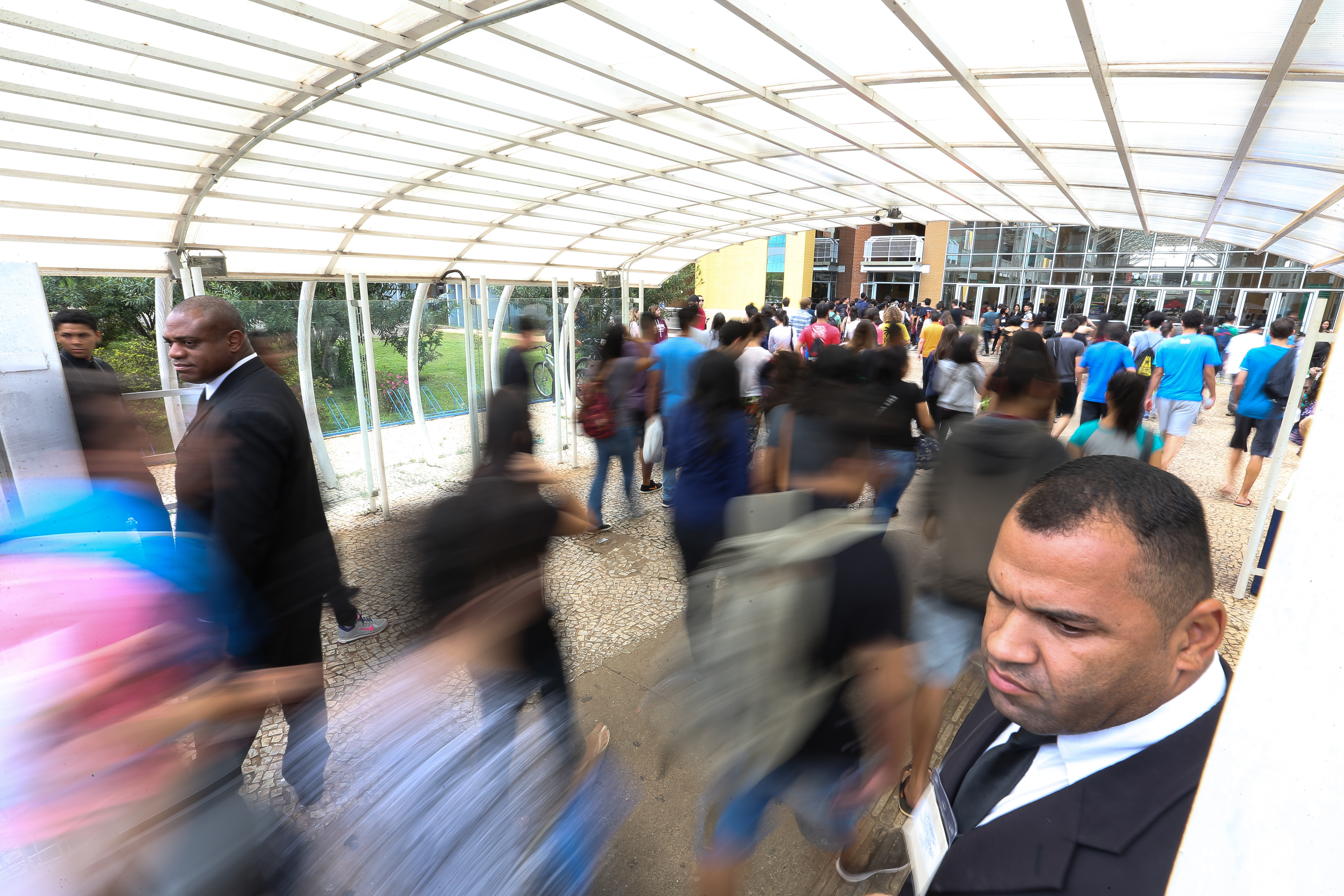
Candidates during the 2017 Enem at a school in Brasília

In 2017, the edition registered 7.6 million applications, showing a decline compared to the previous year, which had reached 9.2 million. That year, the tests began to be applied over two consecutive Sundays, maintaining the same examination schedule. Of the total registrants, 58.6% were women and 41.4% men; the estimated cost for conducting the test was R$ 589 million.

In this edition, the issuance of high school completion certificates through Enem was discontinued, removing nearly 1 million students from the test and giving rise to the ENCCEJA. For the first time, the exam was personalized, with the participant's name and registration number printed on each test booklet.

Regarding test content, a court injunction issued ten days before the exam prohibited Enem organizers from assigning a zero score to essays that violated human rights. Consequently, 291,806 essays were annulled, of which 4,798 violated human rights. In contrast, 53 students achieved a perfect score (1,000) on the essay.

=== 2018 ===
For the 2018 edition, Inep announced several changes. In the official guidelines, the rule that guaranteed a zero score for essays violating human rights was revoked. However, incoherence or inadequate argumentation could still deduct up to 200 points, depending on the assessed competencies. On the second day of the exam, the areas of Natural Sciences and Mathematics received an extra 30 minutes, totaling five hours of test time. Rumors emerged that the exam would become harder due to the extended duration, which was denied by Inep. Another change required requests for fee exemption to be made before registration, resulting in a 19% drop compared to the previous year.

Two controversies marked this edition. The first involved a Linguistics and Codes question featuring a text referencing pajubá, a slang dialect of African origin used by travestis. During a live interview on the program Brasil Urgente on 5 November, a day after the test, President-elect Jair Bolsonaro stated that the question “did not measure any useful knowledge” and that under his administration, the Ministry of Education “would not deal with such issues.” The case sparked widespread debate on social media, including calls from conservative groups to annul the question.

The second controversy involved a Mathematics question alleged to be plagiarized from the 2014 entrance exam of the Federal University of Paraná (UFPR), involving the calculation of a criminal sentence related to drug trafficking. After confirmation, Inep announced an internal investigation to determine responsibility, which could lead to administrative, civil, or criminal proceedings. The question was later annulled from the test. UFPR rector Ricardo Fonseca stated that the university was willing to cooperate with the inquiry.

That year, the absence rate reached 24.9% on the first day—the lowest since 2009—and 29% on the second day, marking a 1% drop compared to the previous edition.

In the essay section, there was a decline in zero scores, with 112,559 essays receiving zero and 55 achieving the maximum score, representing a slight increase from 53 perfect scores in the previous year. Among the top essays, 42 were written by women and 13 by men. The average score for this edition was 522.8.

=== 2019 ===
Continuing from the previous edition, the 2019 Enem underwent several changes as part of a process of optimization and cost reduction. Published on March 11, 2019, in the Official Gazette of the Union, the public notice announced modifications such as the collection of biometric data, now using a multi-use sponge, and a new layout for the test booklet, which included a blank space at the end for calculations and drafting essays. As for coordinators and proctors, the training process was conducted remotely through an exclusive online platform. Another change affected the exam schedule for the North and Northeast regions, which received an additional hour due to the abolition of daylight saving time. As a result, tests in the Northeast, and in the states of Pará, Amapá, and Tocantins, were held simultaneously with those in the Central-West, Southeast, and South regions, since previously they had taken place one hour later.

Both test days achieved new participation figures. On the first Sunday, November 3, 3.9 million students attended, representing 76.9% of those registered. Conversely, the absence rate was 23.1%, equivalent to 1.2 million absentees. That same day, a record 91% of students accessed their confirmation card. On the second Sunday, November 10, the exam registered a record participation rate of 72.9%, surpassing the previous year's 75.24%. The absence rate of 27.19% was the lowest since 2009.

Despite strict security measures to ensure the integrity of the exam, leaks occurred during this edition. On November 3, a photo of the essay prompt was leaked minutes after the test began. The same day, the Ministry of Education confirmed the leak but stated that it would not affect the exam's integrity. Minister Abraham Weintraub announced that the leak originated from the state of Pernambuco. In response, the Federal Police launched Operation Troth to investigate the case. On November 10, a second leak occurred, showing the entire second-day test, which circulated in WhatsApp groups. The Ministry of Education reported that those responsible had been identified but gave no further details. A question from the Humanities and Social Sciences section was annulled because it had been repeated from the previous year in the version for visually impaired candidates.

Regarding essay results, there was a 1% decrease in perfect scores compared to the previous year. Only 53 students achieved a score of 1,000, most of whom were women. The Southeast region accounted for 45.3% of perfect essays, followed by the Northeast with 32%. The state of Minas Gerais had the highest number of perfect scores, with 13 candidates. A total of 143,736 essays received a score of zero, including 56,000 blank essays.

=== 2020 ===
For this edition, the main novelty was the implementation of the Enem Digital, in which participants could take the exam on a computer with internet access blocked. However, this format was still in a testing phase and took place in fifteen Brazilian capitals. The initially chosen dates were November 1 and 8, 2020, for the printed tests, and November 22 and 29 for the digital ones.

However, even though all schools were closed due to the COVID-19 pandemic in Brazil, which led to the cancellation of the school calendar and the implementation of distance education, the initial schedule of the exam was maintained. This decision left a large number of students—especially those from rural areas and favelas without internet access—unable to properly prepare for the test. The situation generated extensive debate and protests supported by digital influencers and politicians, calling for the postponement of the Enem.

The edition was eventually postponed due to the state of public emergency, with new dates set for January 17 and 24 (printed test) and January 31 and February 7 (digital test), and the final results released on March 29, 2021.

Candidates showing symptoms of COVID-19 before the exam were instructed not to attend and to request a rescheduling for February 23 and 24, 2021. The request had to be made through the participant's page, and candidates were advised to call INEP's service center to speed up the process. Preventive measures included reducing classroom capacity to 50%, providing hand sanitizer, encouraging frequent handwashing, and ensuring ventilation. Mask use became mandatory, and students could bring two masks to switch during the exam, both verified by supervisors to prevent irregularities.

On January 13, 2021, the Federal Court ordered the suspension of the exam exclusively in the state of Amazonas due to the worsening pandemic situation. The ruling also allowed any city facing high contamination risk to request the suspension and rescheduling of the exam. Before the decision, the city of Manaus had already announced it would not make its schools available for the test, followed by Parintins.

A large student mobilization demanding another postponement of the Enem gained traction on social media just seven days before the test. On January 12, the Federal Court in São Paulo denied a request from the Public Defender's Office to delay the exam, stating that the responsibility for postponement lay with local authorities.

Amid controversy over candidates being denied entry to testing centers once capacity limits were reached, the first day saw a record absenteeism rate of 51.5%, representing 2,842,332 of the registered participants — the highest rate since 2009. The attendance was 48.5%, or 2,680,697 candidates.

The second test day broke another record, with 3,052,633 absentees (55.3%), and only 2,470,396 participants (44.7%) attending.

On January 27, 2021, the unofficial answer key sparked controversy after students pointed out several errors, along with accusations of racism in English and Portuguese language questions. Due to the backlash, INEP changed the answers to two questions the following day, though students continued to claim additional errors in other sections.

=== 2021 ===
The 2021 edition of the exam was marked by uncertainty regarding whether it would take place at all, due to a tight preparation schedule that made it difficult to organize the test between October and November. At one point, the possibility of postponing the exam to January 2022 was discussed.

On 2 June 2021, the official notice was published, setting the exam dates for 21 and 28 November. Both the printed and the digital versions were scheduled for the same period, in order to save time during the question booklet preparation process, according to INEP. Among the new features of the digital version were accessibility adaptations for candidates with disabilities, including super-enlarged and high-contrast versions of the test for those with low vision, as well as fully accessible test centers. Registrations were open from 30 June to 14 July, with payment accepted until 19 July.

A total of 4,004,764 people registered for the 2021 exam, the lowest number since 2007, but only 3,109,762 confirmed their registration by paying the fee, the lowest confirmed total since 2005.

=== 2022 ===
The 2022 edition was marked by another decline in registration numbers, with a total of 3,409,682 candidates, slightly surpassing the previous year's record low. Of these, 66,544 candidates registered for the digital version of the exam.

=== 2023 ===
Compared to the previous year, the number of registrants rose by approximately 540,000 (a 16% increase), totaling around 3.9 million participants. According to a survey by the newspaper O Globo, registration among low-income candidates increased the most in 2023, accounting for 453,000 of the new applicants. The proportion of students from public schools also grew by 5% compared to the 2022 edition.

In 2023, INEP officially discontinued the Enem Digital format, in which candidates took the test on computers at designated centers. In 2022, the digital exam cost R$25.3 million to administer—equivalent to R$860 per participant—while the printed version cost R$160 per participant. Furthermore, digital-exclusive resources such as videos and audio features were never implemented in the system.

Two days before the first test date, on 3 November, heavy rainfall in the state of São Paulo caused significant power outages that affected 84 of the 308 exam sites across the state. The local energy distributor, Enel São Paulo, stated that full power had been restored by the morning of the exam, although some students and parents at the UniDrummond campus in São Paulo city reported that the building was still without electricity at the time of testing. Enel announced that in cases where repairs were impossible, power generators would be supplied. INEP later confirmed that candidates affected by the storm could request a test rescheduling.

Hours before the start of the exam, a full leak of the Language, Codes and Humanities tests, as well as the writing prompt, was reported. Journalists from O Globo received images of the leaked material and confirmed their authenticity by comparing them with an actual test booklet from a candidate who had just completed the exam. INEP acknowledged the incident and referred the case to the Federal Police for investigation.

=== 2024 ===
Due to the 2024 Rio Grande do Sul floods, candidates from the state were granted a registration fee waiver and given an extended registration period exclusive to local applicants. Originally scheduled to end on 7 June, the national registration deadline was later extended by one week, until 14 June 2024.

=== 2025 ===
The 2025 edition of the Enem was scheduled to take place between 9 and 16 November. However, due to the upcoming 2025 United Nations Climate Change Conference (COP-30), the cities of Belém, Ananindeua, and Marituba—all located in the state of Pará—will hold the exams on separate dates: 30 November and 7 December 2025. The change was made in coordination with the Ministry of Education to avoid logistical conflicts with the international event.

== Exam ==
=== Structure ===
Day	Duration	Area of knowledge	Subjects	Questions
1st	5h 30m	Languages, Codes and their Technologies	Portuguese Language, Literature, Foreign Language (Spanish or English), Arts, Physical Education, and Information and Communication Technologies	45
1st	5h 30m	Human Sciences and their Technologies	History, Geography, Philosophy and Sociology	45
1st	5h 30m	Essay	Argumentative-essay writing	1
2nd	5h ^{1}	Natural Sciences and their Technologies	Biology, Physics, and Chemistry	45
2nd	5h ^{1}	Mathematics and its Technologies	Mathematics	45

^{1}Since 2018, the Ministry of Education has extended the second exam day by 30 minutes, totaling 5 hours.

ENEM differs from traditional university entrance exams applied by individual universities, as it features a transdisciplinary approach. This means that questions are designed to require knowledge from two or more subjects learned in high school to be answered.

Many colleges and universities use ENEM scores in their admission processes, leading to a growing number of participants each year. In Portugal, institutions such as the University of Lisbon, the University of Coimbra, and the University of Beira Interior (in the city of Covilhã) accept ENEM scores for student admission.

The current version of ENEM, in use since October 2009, consists of 180 multiple-choice questions and one essay. There are 45 questions for each of the four subject areas, excluding the essay, making a total of five parts (Languages, Mathematics, Natural Sciences, Human Sciences, and Writing). Since 2017, the exams have been held on two consecutive Sundays (previously on Saturday and Sunday). On the first day, there are 90 questions over 5 hours and 30 minutes (focused on humanities), and another 90 questions on the second day lasting 5 hours (focused on sciences), giving students roughly three minutes per question, including answer sheet filling.

Questions are multiple-choice with five options (A to E) and only one correct answer. To prevent cheating, the test is printed in several color versions (yellow, white, gray, pink, and blue). The versions differ only in the order of questions and alternatives; the content remains the same. Since the test aims to assess skills and competencies rather than rote memorization, it is not divided by subject, and the specific competency assessed in each question is not indicated.

The modern ENEM maintains the need for reading comprehension but increasingly demands mastery of high school content, logic, and interpretation skills rather than rote memorization of formulas or dates. The exam seeks to evaluate students’ reasoning ability and critical thinking.

=== Natural Sciences and their Technologies ===
The Natural Sciences and their Technologies section includes Biology, Physics, and Chemistry. It is common for ENEM to present questions that integrate different subjects in a single problem, testing whether students can apply concepts from all three areas to answer a single question. An example is the topic of energy, which is relevant to all three scientific fields, as well as current themes covered in the media, such as the drunk driving law, the breathalyzer, petroleum, and biotechnology, among others.

=== Human Sciences and their Technologies ===
This section includes History, Geography, Philosophy, and Sociology. As in the Natural Sciences section, a single question may combine themes that span several of these disciplines. These competencies aim to assess candidates’ ethical reasoning and worldview. In the Human Sciences and their Technologies test, ENEM often uses historical images, documents, letters, and book excerpts to create questions related to identity and culture, territory, the state, law, technological evolution, social revolutions, citizenship, and democracy, among others.

=== Languages, Codes and their Technologies ===
This section features questions related to Portuguese language, Literature, Foreign language (English or Spanish), Arts, Physical education, and Information technology. The writing test is administered alongside it. The Literature questions generally focus on required readings from selection processes, covering major authors and movements of Brazilian literature and Portuguese literature. Physical Education questions address topics such as sports, quality of life, folk culture, dance, and others, emphasizing the everyday application of physical activity considering exercise physiology and its benefits, as well as its social and cultural aspects. Another relevant point in ENEM is the articulation of Physical Education with language, art, and body expression.

=== Mathematics and its Technologies ===
This section contains questions related specifically to Mathematics. As expected, it can include topics such as arithmetic and geometry in problem statements related to everyday situations.

=== Essay ===
Essay topics in the Enem exam

1998: Living and learning
1999: Citizenship and social participation
2000: Children's and adolescents’ rights: how to face this national challenge?
2001: Development and environmental preservation: how to reconcile conflicting interests?
2002: The right to vote: how to make this achievement a means to promote the social transformations Brazil needs?
2003: Violence in Brazilian society: how to change the rules of this game
2004: How to ensure freedom of information and prevent abuse in the media
2005: Child labour in Brazilian society
2006: The power of transformation through reading
2007: The challenge of living with differences
2008: How to preserve the Amazon rainforest: immediately suspend deforestation; offer financial incentives to landowners who stop deforestation; or increase monitoring and impose fines on those who deforest
2009: The individual in face of national ethics
2010: Work in building human dignity
2011: Living in a network in the 21st century: the limits between public and private life
2012: Immigration to Brazil in the 21st century
2013: Effects of the implementation of the Dry Law in Brazil
2014: Child advertising in question in Brazil
2015: The persistence of violence against women in Brazilian society
2016.1 (Note: November session): Ways to fight religious intolerance in Brazil
2016.2 (Note: second session): Ways to fight racism in Brazil
2017: Challenges for the educational inclusion of deaf people in Brazil

2018: Manipulation of user behavior through internet data control
2019: Democratization of access to cinema in Brazil
2020.1 (Note: first session, January 2021): The stigma associated with mental illness in Brazilian society
2020.2 (Note: digital version): The challenge of reducing inequalities between Brazil's regions
2020.3 (Note: second session, February 2021): The lack of empathy in social relationships in Brazil
2021: Invisibility and civil registration: guaranteeing access to citizenship in Brazil
2022: Challenges for valuing communities and traditional peoples in Brazil
2023: Challenges in addressing the invisibility of caregiving work performed by women in Brazil
2024: Challenges for valuing African heritage in Brazil
2025.1 (Note: first session, November 2025): Perspectives on aging in Brazilian society
2025.2: The minimum working age as a means of protecting childhood
2026: Recognizing the Unified Health System (SUS) as a universal right

The essay section requires candidates to produce a dissertative-argumentative text of no more than 30 lines and no fewer than seven or eight lines. Prioritizing analytical education, Enem places special emphasis on reasoning, reflection, and critical analysis. It is common for the exam to address major open debates discussed across various media outlets, such as in 2009, when students were asked to write about ethics in light of widespread coverage of corruption scandals in Brazilian politics by the national press.

The exam provides space for a draft, but its instructions clarify that only the text written in the designated area is evaluated — not drafts or text plans. The prompt typically includes a suggested theme, guiding questions for development, and sometimes an anthology of texts or illustrations by national artists to help candidates identify the topic. Once the problem-situation is presented — whether political, social, or cultural — the candidate must reflect, argue, and propose a solution to the issue raised.

Arguably, the most important criterion for an Enem essay is the candidate's stance on the proposed theme. This position is revealed not only through theoretical knowledge but also through personal repertoire — including readings of newspapers, books, magazines, and televised news — to construct a convincing argument in support of a point of view. Among other basic guidelines already outlined on Enem's official website for a strong essay are the cognitive axes (common to all areas of knowledge), which include mastering languages, understanding phenomena, tackling problem situations, building arguments, and developing proposals.

Each essay is evaluated by two independent graders, who do not have access to each other's scores. The final score, ranging up to 1000 points, corresponds to the simple arithmetic mean of both grades. If there is a discrepancy of 200 or more points in total, or 80 or more in any competency, a third grader reviews the essay. Should the third evaluation also differ significantly, a panel of three new graders reassesses the text and determines a new final score.

In addition to the criteria explained above, other essential characteristics required for an approved essay include the defense of human rights, environmental protection, citizenship, and social justice. The Enem essay is evaluated according to five competencies: comprehension of the prompt, command of the standard written language, selection and interpretation of information, construction of arguments, and formulation of a proposal for resolving the discussed issue.

=== Competencies and skills ===
The Enem is structured around five competencies — defined as structural modalities of intelligence, actions, and operations we use to establish relationships with and between objects, situations, phenomena, and people we wish to understand — and 21 skills, defined as deriving from the acquired competencies and referring to the immediate “know-how,” articulated through actions and operations.

Competencies

I Mastering the standard form of the Portuguese language and making use of mathematical, artistic, and scientific language.

II Building and applying concepts from various areas of knowledge to understand natural phenomena, historical-geographical processes, technological production, and artistic manifestations.

III Selecting, organizing, relating, and interpreting data and information represented in different forms, to make decisions and solve problem situations.

IV Relating information represented in different forms and available knowledge in concrete situations to construct consistent arguments.

V Using knowledge developed at school to elaborate proposals for social intervention in reality, respecting human rights and considering sociocultural diversity.

Skills

1 Given a discursive description or illustration of a scientific, technological, or social experiment or phenomenon, identify relevant variables and select the necessary instruments for its execution or interpretation.

2 In a Cartesian graph of socioeconomic or technical-scientific variables, identify and analyze variable values, intervals of growth or decrease, and variation rates.

3 Given a statistical distribution of a social, economic, physical, chemical, or biological variable, translate and interpret available information or reorganize it to make interpolations or extrapolations.

4 Given a problem situation presented in the language of a specific area of knowledge, relate it to its formulation in other languages and vice versa.

5 From the reading of literary texts and information about artistic conceptions, establish relationships between them and their historical, social, political, or cultural contexts, inferring authors’ choices of themes, discursive genres, and expressive resources.

6 Based on a text, analyze language functions, identify sociocultural, regional, register, or stylistic linguistic variations, and explore relationships between formal and informal language.

7 Identify and characterize the conservation and transformations of energy in different processes of its generation and social use, comparing various energy resources and options.

8 Analyze qualitatively or quantitatively the environmental, social, and economic implications of natural, material, or energy resource use processes.

9 Understand the meaning and importance of water and its cycle for maintaining life, in relation to socio-environmental conditions, quantifying temperature variations and phase changes in natural and human-intervention processes.

10 Use and interpret different time scales to situate and describe transformations in the atmosphere, biosphere, hydrosphere, and lithosphere, the origin and evolution of life, population variations, and geographic space changes.

11 In view of the diversity of life, analyze from biological, physical, or chemical perspectives the common patterns in structures and processes that ensure the continuity and evolution of living beings.

12 Analyze socioeconomic and environmental factors associated with the development, living conditions, and health of human populations through the interpretation of various indicators.

13 Understand the systemic character of the planet and recognize the importance of biodiversity for preserving life, relating environmental conditions to human intervention.

14 Given the diversity of geometric shapes, both planar and spatial, present in nature or imagined, characterize them through their properties, relate their elements, calculate lengths, areas, or volumes, and use geometric knowledge to read, understand, and act upon reality.

15 Recognize the random nature of natural or non-natural phenomena and use counting processes, relative frequency representation, sample space construction, distribution, and probability calculation to solve problems.

16 Analyze qualitatively or quantitatively problem situations regarding environmental disturbances, identifying the source, transport, and destination of pollutants, recognizing their transformations, predicting effects on ecosystems and production systems, and proposing forms of intervention to reduce and control pollution effects.

17 In the acquisition and production of materials and energy inputs, identify stages, calculate yields, rates, and indices, and analyze social, economic, and environmental implications.

18 Value the diversity of ethnocultural and artistic heritage, identifying it in its manifestations and representations across different societies, eras, and places.

19 Compare various interpretations of historical-geographical, technical-scientific, artistic-cultural, or everyday situations or facts, identifying the assumptions of each interpretation and analyzing the validity of the arguments used.

20 Compare socioeconomic formation processes, relating them to their historical and geographical contexts.

21 Given a set of information about a historical-geographical reality, contextualize and organize the recorded events, understanding the importance of social, economic, political, or cultural factors.

=== Cost ===
Year	Registration fee
2023	R$85
2022	R$85
2021	R$85
2020	R$85
2019	R$85
2018	R$82
2017	R$82
2016	R$68
2015	R$63
2014	R$35
2013	R$35
2012	R$35
2011	R$35
2010	R$35
2009	R$35

Most students registered for the ENEM are eligible for an exemption from the registration fee. Fee waivers are available to students completing high school in a public school, those who attended all of high school in a public institution or private school with a full scholarship and have low income, as well as individuals in socioeconomic vulnerability registered in the CadÚnico program.

Students who received a fee exemption but did not attend the exam lose the right to exemption in the following edition unless they justify their absence, such as in cases of medical emergency. Other applicants must pay the registration fee, which was set at R$35 until 2014, when it began to increase, reaching R$85 per candidate by 2022.

== Use ==
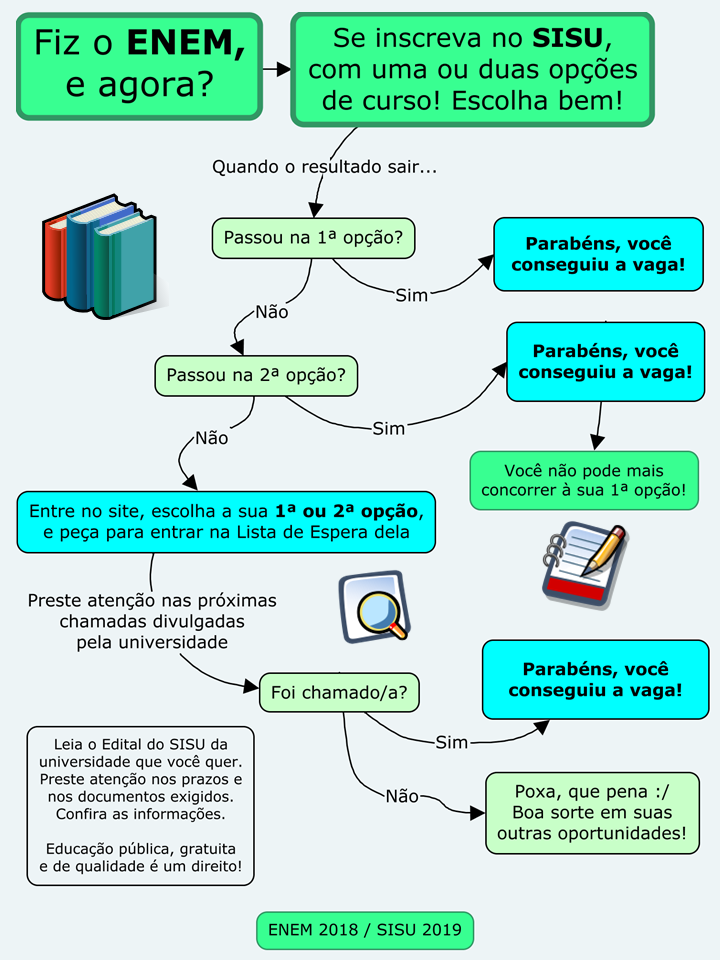
Flowchart explaining how SISU works

=== By participants ===
The Enem score can be used for admission to higher education in Brazilian or foreign universities that have adopted the exam as a full or partial selection method. Each university has the autonomy to decide how it will use the Enem score. There are three main programs created by the Brazilian Federal Government for access to higher education based on Enem performance: the Unified Selection System (SiSU), the University for All Program (ProUni), and the Student Financing Fund (FIES).

Through the Unified Selection System (SiSU), participants compete for vacancies in public higher education institutions (federal and state). The University for All Program (ProUni) allows candidates to apply for full or partial scholarships at private higher education institutions. Finally, the Student Financing Fund (FIES) is a credit line with incentives and resources from the Brazilian government to finance students’ education at private institutions.

However, many public universities have their own selection systems based on Enem scores, without participating in SiSU. Examples include the University of São Paulo, which left SiSU and created the ENEM-USP Selection Process; the University of Campinas (Unicamp), which uses the ENEM-Unicamp system; and the University of Brasília, which uses Enem scores for admission.

=== By government agencies ===
The results of Enem are used by the Brazilian government as a tool to assess the overall quality of secondary education in the country, helping to guide educational policies. These evaluations have shown, for example, the gap between the levels of public and private education. Even in an exam that assesses skills and competencies rather than rote memorization, the difference between public and private school students’ scores reached 62% in 2005.

=== Results ===
The Enem results of a given year are released only in the following year. Thus, in 2009, the scores from 2008 were considered. Each school's scores range from 0 to 100, based on the average results of its students who took the exam. There are criticisms regarding the Enem scoring system, as a school's score does not necessarily reflect its quality. Similarly, a higher or lower ranking does not necessarily indicate that one school is better or worse than another.

Based on Enem 2008 data, some sociodemographic factors that negatively influence Enem scores include the candidate's age, employment status, having siblings who share limited family resources, and attending evening classes. Regarding gender, men performed better in the objective test, while women scored higher in the essay. In terms of skin color, Black and Brown candidates scored lower on average than White and Asian students.

Parents’ educational level and household income are the strongest determinants of student performance, as they correlate with the amount of resources available for education. The number of household members, however, reduces these resources per student, leading to lower scores on the exam. Across Brazil, the average score of all schools was 43.930. The institution with the highest national score in 2008 was the Colégio de São Bento in Rio de Janeiro.

== See also ==
- Vestibular
- Instituto Nacional de Estudos e Pesquisas Educacionais Anísio Teixeira
- Fundação Cesgranrio
- University admissions in Brazil
- 2010 Enem issues
