= Programa Universidade para Todos =

Brazilian social welfare program

The Programa Universidade para Todos (English: University for All Program), also known as ProUni, was created by the Brazilian Federal Government and developed by Fernando Haddad, Minister of Education at the time, with the purpose of providing full and partial scholarships in undergraduate and sequential courses of specific training in private higher education institutions. It was instituted by Law No. 11,096 of January 13, 2005 during Lula's administration.

By 2013, Prouni had provided access to higher education for 1.2 million young people at 1,116 private higher education institutions involved in the program, with an average equivalent of one scholarship for every 10.7 paying students.

== Requirements ==
Brazilian students who do not have a university degree and who meet at least one of the following conditions can take part in Prouni:

- have completed high school in a public institution;
- have completed high school in a private institution on a full scholarship;
- have attended high school partially at a public institution and partially at a private institution as a full scholarship student at the private establishment;
- be a person with a disability;
- teach basic education in the public school system on a permanent basis and have a degree in education. In this case there are no income requirements.

== Selection process ==
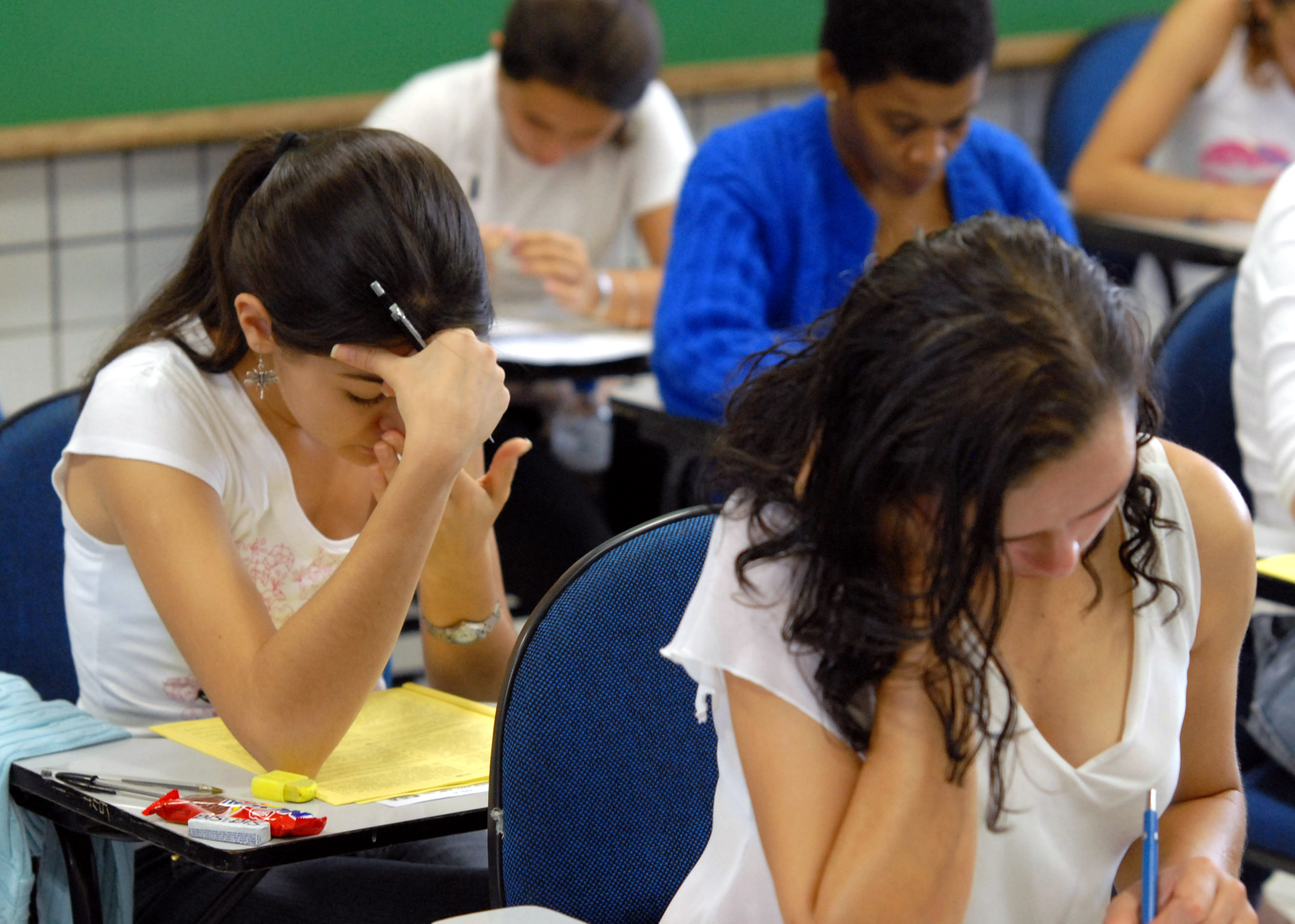
ENEM participants.

The ProUni selection process is composed of two phases: the regular process and the remaining scholarship process. In the regular process, candidates who have taken part in the National High School Exam (ENEM in Portuguese) of the previous year and who have obtained at least 450 points on the average of the exam scores and a score above zero on the essay can apply. Candidates can apply for the remaining scholarships if they:

- have enrolled, in all their options, in courses registered as not having a class in the ProUni selection process for the second semester of 2014;
- teach basic education in the public school system on a permanent basis and have a degree in education;
- have participated in ENEM, from the 2010 edition onwards, and have obtained an average score of 450 points or more in the tests and a score of more than zero in the essay, corresponding to approximately half of the correct answers in each test.

Applications for both processes are free of charge and made exclusively online, via the official website. There are two Prouni selection processes a year, one in the first semester and one in the second semester. There is also a waiting list with the aim of filling the scholarships left over from the regular calls. To compete for full scholarships, applicants must have a gross monthly family income of up to one and a half minimum wages per person. For 50% partial scholarships, the gross monthly family income must be up to three minimum wages per person. In addition, applicants must meet at least one of the requirements below:

- have completed high school in a public institution;
- have completed high school in a private institution on a full scholarship;
- teach basic education in the public school system on a permanent basis and have a degree in education. In this case there are no income requirements.

=== Quotas ===
Candidates with disabilities or self-declared as indigenous, black or brown can apply for inclusive assistance scholarships. Several students report prejudice and discrimination because they are ProUnistas, which indicates the existence of preconceptions related to the students who participate in the program.

=== Number of scholarships ===
Year	Scholarships offered		
Year	Partial	Full	Total
2021	64,847	69,482	134,329
2022	91,965	181,036	273,001

== Differences between ProUni, SISU and FIES ==
Brazil's Ministry of Education has three different educational programs:

- ProUni: grants full and partial scholarships of 50% in private higher education institutions, in undergraduate and sequential courses of specific training, to Brazilian students without a higher education degree;
- SISU - Sistema de Seleção Unificada (English: Unified Selection System): a digital platform for public higher education institutions offer vacancies to candidates who participated in ENEM;
- FIES - Fundo de Financiamento ao Estudante do Ensino Superior (English: Higher Education Student Financing Fund): finances higher education for students enrolled in non-free institutions. Partial ProUni scholarship holders can use FIES to cover the other 50% of their tuition fees, without having to provide a guarantor when signing up for the loan. The institution selected must have signed a Fies Adhesion Agreement.

== See also ==
- Universities and higher education in Brazil
- Ministry of Education (Brazil)
