= Fundo de Financiamento ao Estudante do Ensino Superior =

Brazilian social welfare program

The Fundo de Financiamento ao Estudante do Ensino Superior (English: Higher Education Student Financing Fund), also known as FIES, is a Brazilian Ministry of Education program created in 1999 with the aim of financing higher education degrees for students enrolled in private institutions. It allows students to start paying their tuition fees only after graduation.

== History ==
In 1975, the Ernesto Geisel administration created the Programa de Crédito Educativo (English: Educational Credit Program), reformulated in 1999 during the Fernando Henrique Cardoso government and renamed FIES. Expanded in 2010 by the Lula government, the FIES interest rate was adjusted from 6.5% to 3.4% p.a. (below the SELIC rate). It also established a grace period of 18 months after the end of the course for the beneficiary student to start making payments and extended the repayment period to up to three times the duration of the course.

In 2014, 26% of students enrolled in private higher education institutions benefited from FIES, representing an investment of around R$13 billion by the national government. In December 2014 and early 2015, the administration implemented changes to the criteria for granting finance by limiting the rate of annual readjustment of tuition fees and requiring students to achieve a minimum of 450 points and not to have failed the essay in the National High School Exam (ENEM). At the beginning of 2016, the program faced a cut of R$2 billion (16% compared to the 2015 budget) and changes to the rules and restrictions on access.

In 2018, during the Temer government, the Ministry of Education announced new features for FIES. The maximum amount of tuition financed was increased, now accepting courses costing up to 7,000 reais per month and up to 10,000 reais for medical courses, limited to 42,900 and 60,000 reais per semester, respectively. In addition, the MEC emphasized that 100,000 students will be able to finance the course with zero interest, as long as they belong to the group with a family income of up to three minimum wages; the ENEM score is used as the classification criterion for this benefit.

== Requirements ==
Candidates interested in the selection process must meet the following requirements:

- Has not completed a higher education course;
- Has a gross monthly family income per person of up to 3 minimum wages;
- Participated in one of the ENEM editions from 2010 onwards;
- Obtained at least 450 points on the average of the tests and a score higher than 0 on the essay.

As of 2015, courses rated 5 and 4 in the Sistema Nacional de Avaliação da Educação Superior (SINAES) were given priority, as were courses in the North, Northeast and Central-West regions, with the exception of the Federal District. Students financed by FIES were granted a 5% discount on their tuition fees through the institutions.

To be eligible for FIES, applicants must have taken the ENEM from 2010 onwards, except in the following cases:

- A public school teacher, working as a teacher in basic education;
- A member of the permanent staff of a public institution;
- Be regularly enrolled in a teaching degree course;

=== Selection process ===
The FIES selection process allows applicants to choose up to three courses. Like SISU, it has a cut-off score updated daily, according to the programs chosen by the student. The tie-breaking criteria in the FIES placement process are as follows:

- Higher ENEM score;
- Non-graduate applicants with a greater chance of obtaining funding;
- Higher score in the ENEM essay;
- Highest score in Languages, Mathematics, Natural Sciences and Human Sciences, respectively;
- Those who have not yet graduated.

=== Renewal ===
The renewal of the financing can be classified in two ways: simplified, when there are no changes to the contractual clauses of the financing, and non-simplified, when there are changes to the contract.

=== Temporary suspension ===
Temporary suspension can occur in the following situations:

- The student can request the temporary suspension of the contract through the FIES Computerized System (SisFIES), until the 15th day of the months of January to May, for the 1st semester, and July to November, for the 2nd semester. The suspension will only be valid from the first day of the month following the month in which the request was made;
- If the student wants to temporarily suspend the semester for which the financing has not been renewed, they can request this in any month of the semester to be suspended;
- It is possible to suspend funding for up to two consecutive semesters;
- The suspension must be approved by the Permanent Supervision and Monitoring Commission (CPSA) of the educational institution to which the student is linked;
- In specific cases, analyzed and validated by the CPSA, the student can be suspended for another semester; if the educational institution closes its activities with MEC recognition, the student can be suspended for up to two more semesters;
- Suspension can be requested by the operating agent if the financing is not renewed every semester during the established period.

=== Termination of contract ===
If the student has completed the financing period, the grace and amortization phases will start automatically. If the student wishes to request an early termination, they must access the FIES Computerized System (SisFIES) and choose one of the following options:

- Settle the outstanding balance of the loan when the Closing Agreement is signed;
- Remain in the use phase of the financing and comply with the grace and amortization phases in accordance with the terms of the contract;
- Anticipate the grace period of the financing and comply with the amortization phase in accordance with the terms of the contract;
- Anticipate the repayment phase of the loan and make the installment payments in accordance with the terms of the contract.

== Operation ==
FIES is operated by Caixa Econômica Federal and Banco do Brasil. All the operations of the selection process, from the adhesion of educational institutions and student registration to the publication of results and interviews, are carried out over the Internet. The selection criteria are impersonal and objective.

== See also ==
- ProUni
- Universities and higher education in Brazil
- Ministry of Education (Brazil)
