= Sistema de Seleção Unificada =

Brazilian digital platform

The Sistema de Seleção Unificada (English: Unified Selection System - SiSU) is a digital platform launched in January 2010 and developed by the Brazilian Ministry of Education (MEC). It is used by students who attended the National High School Exam (Portuguese: Exame Nacional do Ensino Médio - ENEM) to apply to higher education institutions that use ENEM scores as a method of admission. From 2024, the system will be limited to one edition per year, which will be held in January.

SiSU operates in stages. During the day, it is open for students to select and change their preferences and closes for a two-hour period in the evening to process the ranking. ENEM is also done by people interested in receiving a full or partial scholarship at a private university through the University for All Program (Programa Universidade para Todos - ProUni). Since 2014, it has also been used to obtain financing through the Higher Education Student Financing Fund (Fundo de Financiamento ao Estudante do Ensino Superior - FIES).

== Utilization ==
=== Number of vacancies ===
==== 2010s ====
In 2011, 83,125 places were offered in 83 public higher education institutions in the first semester, which represented an increase of 77% compared to the first semester of 2010, when 47,000 places were made available. In 2012, the first edition offered 108,552 places in 3,327 courses at 92 institutes. In 2013, 129,319 places were available at 101 institutions, an increase of 18% compared to the previous year.

In 2014, 171,401 vacancies were allocated to 4,723 courses at 115 public higher education institutions in the first edition and 51,412 vacancies to 1,447 courses at 67 public institutions in the second edition. In the first edition in 2015, 205,514 places were offered on 5,631 courses at 128 institutes. In 2016, 228,071 places in 6,323 courses at 131 institutions were available, an increase of 10.9%. In 2017, 238,397 places were allocated to the same number of institutions.

In the first semester of 2018, students were eligible for 239,601 places at 130 federal and state public higher education institutions; in the second semester, there were 57,271 vacancies at 68 institutions. The first edition of SISU 2019 offered 235,461 places at 129 institutions, while the second launched 59,028.

==== 2020s ====
In 2020, the first edition of SiSU filled 237,128 vacancies in 128 educational institutions and the second edition covered 51,800 vacancies in 57 institutes. In 2021, 206,609 seats were offered in more than 5,500 undergraduate courses at 109 institutions in the first semester and 62,365 seats in 1,932 programs at 70 institutions in the second semester.

In the first semester of 2022, 222,000 vacancies in 6,146 degree courses available in 125 public higher education institutions were allocated; in the second semester, 65,932 vacancies at 73 institutions were distributed. In 2023, 226,399 places were offered for 6,402 undergraduate courses at 128 institutions in the first edition and 51,277 places for 1,666 courses at 65 institutions in the second edition. In 2024, the first year with a single edition, 264,181 places, distributed among 6,827 courses at 127 higher education institutions, were available.

=== Participating universities ===
In 2024, 127 higher education institutions will participate in SiSU, including 95 state and federal universities, 29 federal institutes, 2 federal technological education centers and Pedro II School.

== System operation ==
From 2024, SiSU will be held once a year. Candidates can select up to two course options and modify them during the registration period. Institutions can establish different subject criteria and a minimum grade for each program. The cut-off score is the lowest mark required to qualify for a course and is based on the number of vacancies and the total number of applicants. Once a day, SiSU calculates and publishes the cut-off score for each course.

=== Tie-breaking criteria ===
The tie-breaker is based on the following criteria:

- highest grade in Writing;
- highest grade in Languages, Codes and their Technologies;
- highest score in Mathematics and its Technologies;
- highest score in Natural Sciences and their Technologies;
- highest score in Human Sciences and their Technologies.

As the cut-off score changes daily, candidates may be higher than the cut-off score one day, but lower the next. Applicants need to monitor the cut-off scores during the application period in order to get the best course possible.

=== Registration methods ===
Application to SiSU is available in three ways:

- Open competition: anyone who participated in the previous edition of ENEM can apply;
- Quotas: the Quotas Law of August 29, 2012 determines that institutions must reserve 50% of vacancies for students who attended public schools and have a gross monthly family income of up to one minimum wage per person. A percentage of seats is also allocated to self-declared black, brown, quilombola or indigenous students;
- Affirmative action: it depends on each institution and can be done by reserving places or through a bonus in the candidate's final grade; it is not compulsory.

==== Vacancies reserved for people with disabilities ====
In 2013, Oscar Costa Filho, a prosecutor from the Federal Public Prosecutor's Office in Ceará, filed a lawsuit in the Federal Court against the Ministry of Education to ensure that people with disabilities are guaranteed vacancies at higher education institutions that use SISU. In 2016, Law 14.309 amended the Quotas Law and included vacancies for people with disabilities in secondary and higher technical courses at federal educational institutions.

=== Waiting list ===
The SiSU waiting list is for candidates who were unsuccessful in their selected courses in the regular call. It allocates unfilled places to those who have not yet been selected. Registration for the waiting list is done online immediately after the announcement of the regular call. However, candidates must indicate their intention to join the list.

== Problems ==
=== System crash ===
The SiSU website began operating on January 29, 2010, and has received criticism for its instability and slowness from students and the media ever since. According to the MEC, the capacity reported in 2010 was 200,000 simultaneous visits. Access problems and slowdowns reoccurred in 2011, which required a judicial decision to force the MEC to extend the registration deadline. In 2020, the system suffered instability due to a large volume of accesses, which peaked at 350,000 simultaneous visits.

=== Information leakage ===
In 2011, information leakage occurred. Upon entering the system using their own access code, candidates were able to access data such as the performance and course options of other applicants. In 2013, in another incident, candidates had access to test scores, cell phone numbers and the e-mail addresses of other applicants through the support function. According to the MEC, the glitch was repaired a few minutes after registration opened.

=== Password recovery abuse ===
In 2016, SiSU changed its mechanism for modifying lost passwords. Until 2015, users had to provide the e-mail address or cell phone number used when registering for ENEM in order for a new password to be created and sent to them by one of these means. After the change, CPF, mother's name, residence and date of birth were enough for the system to accept a new password provided by the user. As this information is often publicly available, some students have been victims of vandalism, with their accounts hacked and course options changed by others.

== See also ==
- Universities and higher education in Brazil
