= Instituto Nacional de Estudos e Pesquisas Educacionais Anísio Teixeira =

Associated agency of the Brazilian Ministry of Education

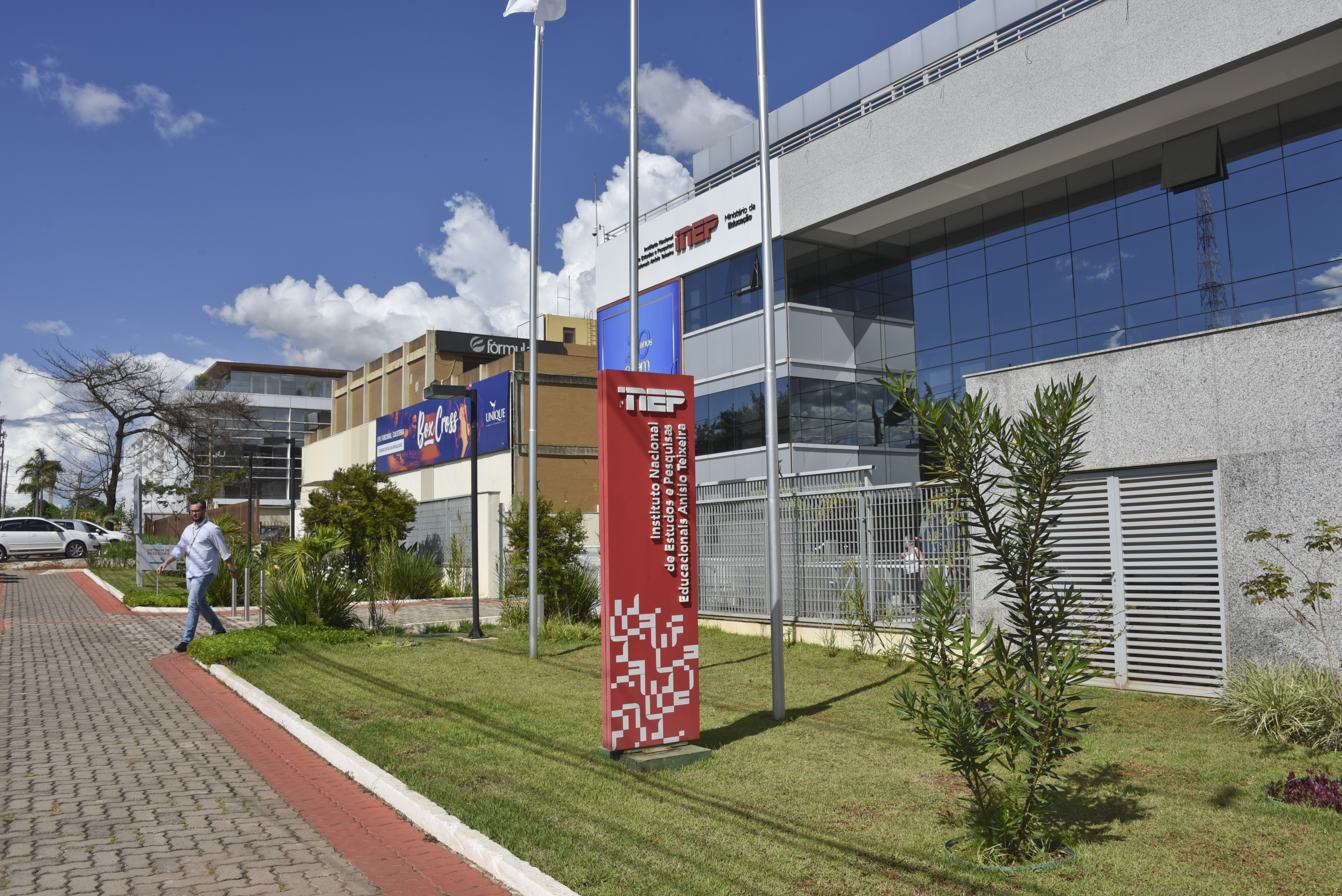
- Fachada do prédio do INEP

Agency overview
- Formed: 13 January 1937
- Type: autarquia federal
- Jurisdiction: Brazil
- Headquarters: SIG, Quadra 04, Lote 327, 70610-908 Brasilia; 15.788056°S 47.914704°W
- Agency executive: Manuel Palácios da Cunha e Melo, Director-president
- Parent department: Brazilian Ministry of Education
- Website: http://www.gov.br/inep

The Instituto Nacional de Estudos e Pesquisas Educacionais Anísio Teixeira (INEP) is an agency connected to the Brazilian Ministry of Education in charge of evaluating educational systems and the quality of education in Brazil.

== See also ==
- Universities and higher education in Brazil
- CNPq
- Lattes Platform
- Brazilian science and technology
- Ministry of Education (Brazil)
- Coordenadoria de Aperfeiçoamento de Pessoal de Nível Superior (CAPES)
- Undergraduate education in Brazil
- Graduate degrees in Brazil
- Bachelor's degree in Brazil
