= Renato Feder =

Brazilian businessman

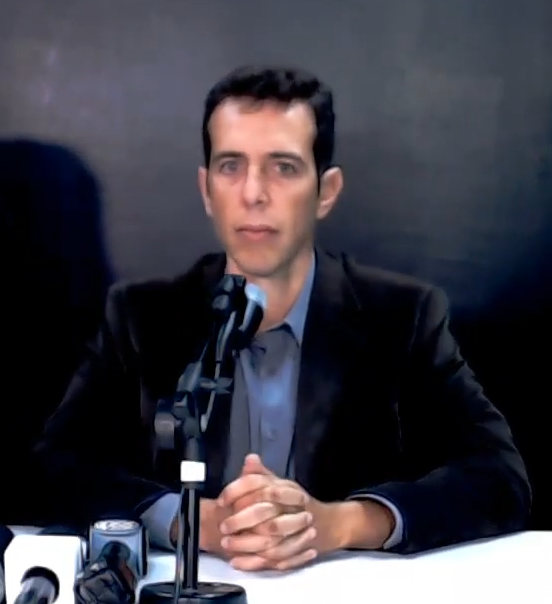

State Secretary of Education of São Paulo
- Incumbent
- Assumed office 1 January 2023
- Governor: Tarcísio de Freitas
- Preceded by: Hubert Alquéres

State Secretary of Education and Sports of Paraná
- In office 1 January 2019 – 1 January 2023
- Governor: Ratinho Júnior
- Preceded by: Lúcia Martins
- Succeeded by: Roni Miranda

CEO of Multilaser
- In office 2003–2018 Serving with Alexandre Ostrowiecki
- Preceded by: Israel Ostrowiecki
- Succeeded by: Alexandre Ostrowiecki

Personal details
- Born: 28 June 1978 (age 48) São Paulo, São Paulo, Brazil
- Party: PSD (Since 2021)
- Other political affiliations: NOVO (2016–2020)
- Education: Getúlio Vargas Foundation (BBA); University of São Paulo (MEc)
- Profession: Entrepreneur

Renato Feder (born 28 June 1978, in São Paulo) is a Brazilian economist, entrepreneur, politician and professor. He has been serving as the State Secretary of Education of São Paulo since January 2023 and had served as Secretary of Education of Paraná from 2019 to 2023. Feder is also a partner at the Brazilian electronics and computing company, Multilaser.

== Biography ==
Feder was born in the city of São Paulo in 1978. He graduated in Administration at Getúlio Vargas Foundation, and received a Master in Economics at University of São Paulo (USP).

=== Career ===
At Multilaser, Brazilian S.A. company in the branch of electronics and computing, founded in 1987, which he leads alongside Alexandre Ostrowiecki, he acts in import and commercialization of products from sectors of technology, multimedia accessories and toys.

He assumed an office in the State Secretariat of Education of Paraná in 2019, nominated by Governor Ratinho Júnior.

In June 2020, Feder was considered to succeed Abraham Weintraub in the Ministry of Education.

On 3 July 2020, it was announced that Feder was chosen by President Jair Bolsonaro as the next Minister of Education, where he would succeed Carlos Decotelli, who was nominated but didn't take office. Two days later, he declined the invitation.

In November 2022, Feder was announced as a member of São Paulo Governor Tarcísio de Freitas's team of secretaries. At the time, he was still in charge of the Education portfolio in the state of Paraná.

Business positions
Preceded by Israel Ostrowiecki	CEO of Multilaser; 2003–2018; Served alongside: Alexandre Ostrowiecki	Succeeded by Alexandre Ostrowiecki
Political offices
Preceded by Lúcia Martins	State Secretary of Education of Paraná; 2019–2023	Succeeded by Roni Miranda
Preceded by Hubert Alquéres	State Secretary of Education of São Paulo; 2023–present	Incumbent
