= Benjamin Constant (disambiguation) =

Benjamin Constant may be:

People

- Benjamin Constant (1767–1830), Swiss-French politician and author Henri Benjamin Constant de Rebecque
- Benjamin Constant (military) (1836–1891), Brazilian military man and politician Benjamin Constant Botelho de Magalhães
- Jean-Joseph Benjamin-Constant (surname sometimes seen as "Benjamin Constant") (1845–1902), French painter

Places

- Benjamin Constant, Amazonas, a city in the state of Amazonas, Brazil
- Benjamin Constant do Sul, a town in the state of Rio Grande do Sul, Brazil

Other

- Instituto Benjamin Constant
