= Mackenzie Evangelical University Hospital =

- Mackenzie Presbyterian Institute
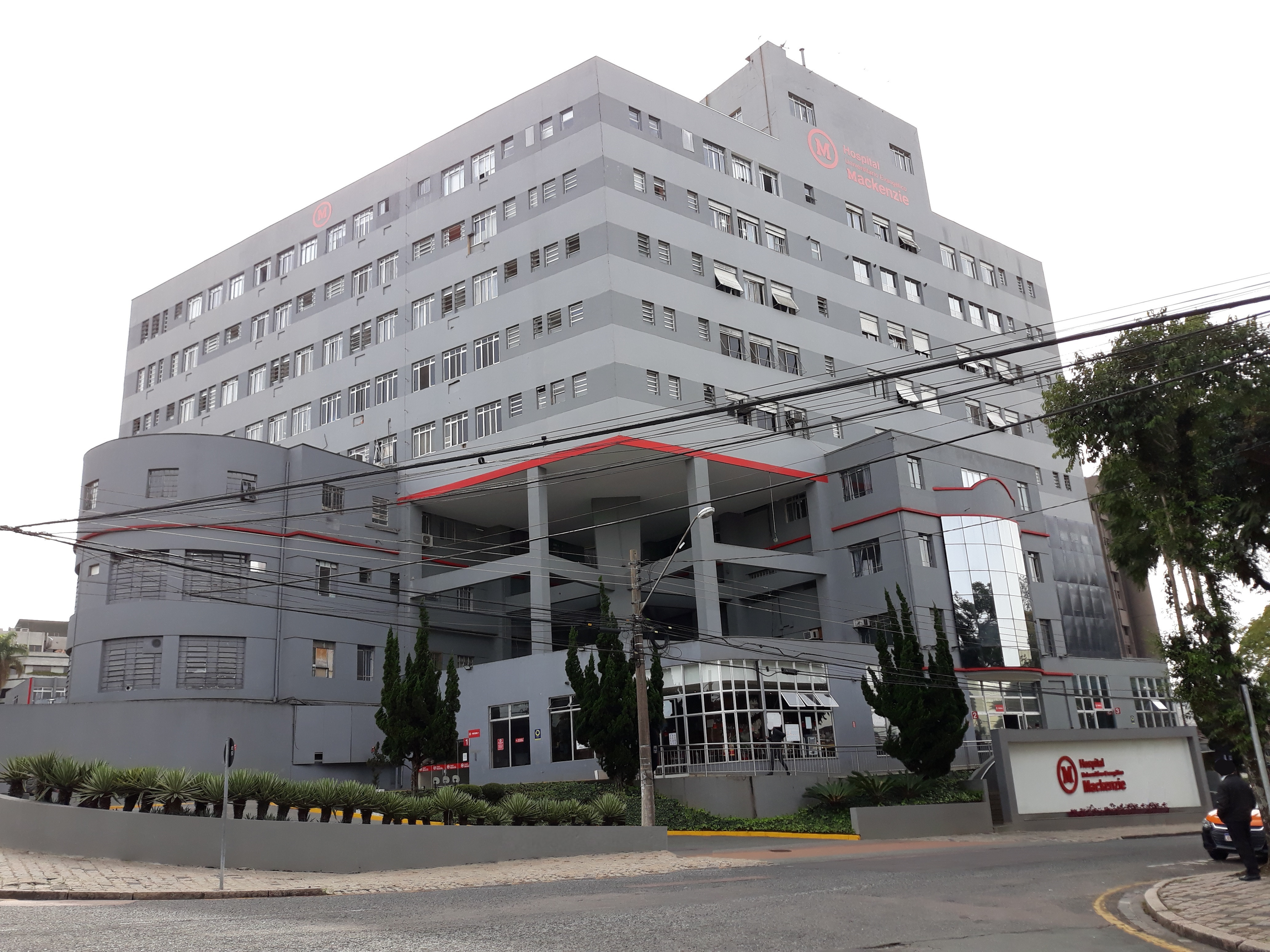
- The front entrance of Mackenzie Evangelical University Hospital

Geography
- Location: Alameda Augusto Stellfeld, 1908, Curitiba, Paraná, Brazil
- Coordinates: 25°26′3.91″S 49°17′31.17″W

Organisation
- Care system: Sistema Único de Saúde
- Type: Teaching
- Affiliated university: Mackenzie Evangelical College of Paraná

Services
- Beds: 475

History
- Construction started: 1947
- Opened: 1959

Links
- Website: https://hospital.mackenzie.br/huem/home

The Mackenzie Evangelical University Hospital is the Mackenzie Evangelical College of Paraná's university hospital, located in Curitiba, State of Paraná, Brazil. It is the largest private medical center in that Brazilian state, with 475 beds and 4 facilities, besides being the developer and owner of the first multi-tissue bank of Brazil. The hospital handles approximately 1.1 million outpatient visits each year, 90% of which are covered by Brazil's public healthcare system, SUS (Sistema Único de Saúde).

== History ==
The hospital was founded by Parísio Cidade, a Presbyterian minister, whose goal was to offer to the population of the Brazilian States of Paraná and Santa Catarina specialized health care. By partnering with ministers from several other Christian denominations, Parísio Cidade founded the Sociedade Evangélica Beneficente (Beneficent Evangelical Society) in 1945. The donations it raised, including the estate where the hospital is currently located, made the construction possible. The construction works started in 1947.

After 12 years, in 1959, the Evangelical Hospital of Curitiba was inaugurated, with 120 beds. Its first patient was Curitiba’s mayor, General Iberê de Matos.

The Mackenzie Evangelical College of Paraná was established in the medical center's ninth year (1968).

In 1971, the hospital expansion increased the number of beds available for patients. A pentagonal five-story-high building was built above the original one.

Four years later, in 1975, residency programs were created. In their first years, the majority of the positions offered were occupied by students from Mackenzie Evangelical College of Paraná.

In 2013, the then head of the Hospital ICU, Virginia Helena Soares de Souza, as well as 7 other members of the unit team, were arrested on suspicion of inducing the death of over 300 patients for the release of ICU beds. This case generated great national and international repercussion.

In 2018, both the Evangelical University Hospital and the Evangelical College of Paraná were acquired by the Instituto Presbiteriano Mackenzie (Mackenzie Presbyterian Institute), that renamed both institutions to Hospital Universitário Evangélico Mackenzie (Mackenzie Evangelical University Hospital) and Faculdade Evangélica Mackenzie do Paraná (Mackenzie Evangelical College of Paraná), respectively.

On its 60th anniversary year, new facilities were inaugurated for the medical center's emergency department, pediatrics unit and surgical center. The Mackenzie Women Unit and the Oncology center were inaugurated in the following year (2020). The latter is dedicated to host chemotherapy sessions, while the former, to host Obstetrics and Gynecology related procedures. A new area was built to the hospital's residents in 2021. Brazil’s Education Minister, Mr. Milton Ribeiro, was present at the event. In the same year, the country's first multi-tissue bank was founded by the establishment.

== Facilities ==
The Mackenzie Evangelical University Hospital main building is located at Rua Augusto Stellfeld, 1908, Curitiba, State of Paraná, Brazil. Two ambulatory care units are detached from the main building. The I Iguaçu ambulatory care unit is located at the Avenida Iguaçu, 820, while the II FEMPAR ambulatory care unit is located inside the premises of the college. The fourth building is the Mackenzie Women Unit and the Oncology Center, located at Rua Bruno Filgueira, 1569.
