= Brazil and the World Bank =

Joined World Bank: January 14, 1946 Projects: 540 Total as of December 2019. 44 projects still active

The relationship between Brazil and the World Bank has been successful for many years, despite numerous challenges.

== Background and history ==
According to the World Bank, Brazil is labeled as an upper middle income country with a current GDP of $1.869 Trillion as of the year of 2018. Brazil is the largest country in the LAC region (8.52 million square kilometers), with a GNI per capita of US$14,810 and with a population of 207 million (2016). A favorable external environment, credit-fueled consumption, an expanding labor force and an expansion of social programs contributed to fast economic and social progress between 2001 and 2015.

During 2012–2015, Brazil was one of the largest borrowers of the World Bank Group, with a total of US$17.5 billion invested during these four years. After 2015, with the onset of the economic crisis and given limited fiscal space for new investments, IBRD lending has declined to around US$500 million per year and the program has shifted instead on building the knowledge foundations for supporting an adjustment in Brazil's growth model and in the World Bank's engagement to support it. IFC has continued to invest around US$1.5 billion per year, although with a shifting profile of clients.

Between 2017 and 2018 Brazil had a small 1.1% growth in GDP in 2017 and 1.3% growth in 2018. This small recovery has slowed down the economy significantly and caused much loss in consumer trust, and outside investment. In 2019, the Brazilian economy experienced minimal growth similar to the previous two years, with GDP increasing by only 1.1%. This performance was below expectations despite changes in government and the introduction of new economic policies advocating for pro-market structural reforms. External factors, such as the Argentine crisis and unexpected events like the Brumadinho disaster, along with a slow legislative process for reform adoption, hindered investment stimulation and labor market and consumption growth. Before the onset of the COVID-19 pandemic in 2020, the Brazilian economy had already shown signs of stagnation in the first quarter. GDP decreased by 0.3% compared to the previous quarter, or by 1.5% when adjusted for seasonal variations. This decline was accompanied by significant decreases in sectors like manufacturing and minerals, as well as in household demand and consumption.

Following the pandemic, Brazil experienced a 2.9 percent expansion in real GDP in 2023, propelled by vigorous private consumption buoyed by a robust labor market and fiscal support for social transfers. Favorable external conditions also contributed to growth through increased exports. However, in 2024, GDP growth is projected to slow to 1.7 percent due to the delayed impacts of monetary policy tightening and a reduced carry-over effect from the previous year.

Brazil became a member of the World Bank on January 14, 1946, with its first project starting in the late 1940s. The majority of projects that are funded or assisted by the World Bank involve public infrastructure or land management. Land Management projects usually involve direct correlation with the agriculture, sanitation, and urban planning departments. The very first project that the world bank assisted on in Brazil was started on January 7, 1949. The project was called Power and Telephone Project. The Power and Telephone Project has the joint objectives of developing hydroelectric power generation and telephone services, including long-distance services, in the highly industrialized and populated areas of Brazil. This project services light and hydroelectric management to provide sustainable lighting and energy in more rural and impoverished areas. Throughout the rest of the 20th century, the majority of projects have been over sustainability of infrastructure in poor and rural areas. Most projects have been oriented towards clean water, sustainable energy and efficient land restoration and use. As climate change, deforestation and other more recent alarming world events have taken place over the past 50 years, more and more projects are oriented towards conservation and renewable energy efforts.

== World Bank involvement and focal areas ==
=== Fiscal consolidation and government effectiveness for sustainable, inclusive and efficient service delivery ===
==== COVID-19 aid and relief ====
Brazil was greatly affected by the COVID-19 outbreak; by September 20, 2020, the nation had the third highest number of recorded cases (4.5 million) along with upwards of 136,000 deaths. The Government of Brazil requested aid from the World Bank, and on October 29, 2020, The World Bank approved a US$1 billion loan to the republic of Brazil with the intent of mitigating the negative impacts of the COVID-19 virus on poor families. COVID-19 hit Brazil as they were recovering from their 2014-2016 crisis, leaving millions of Brazilians unemployed and (9.3 million) below the extreme poverty line. According to the World Bank, this COVID-19 relief project yielded "satisfactory" results, among them being 6 million Brazilian families being held above extreme poverty, which was about 5 times more than the 1.2 million families projected to receive aid.

==== Public finance ====
The Brazilian economy has seen much halt and stop due to the deterioration in the structure of public finance. In order to support the strengthening of the fiscal management at all levels of government, it is important to sustain the structure of the institutional and legal systems that control the public finance sector. The World Bank will assist the government in improving the fiscal sustainability and fairness of the social security system. And it will work with federal and sub national governments to increase effectiveness of services delivery in education and in health. Underlying all the World Bank's objectives is the aim to ensure that the ongoing fiscal adjustment is of high quality and does not fall disproportionately on the poor and bottom 40%, whilst laying the necessary foundation for a sustainable recovery.

The Bank will work with the federal government to achieve implementation of the expenditure rule as a means to achieve fiscal adjustment and restore fiscal sustainability at the federal level, through a reduction in federal government primary expenditures in real terms. To achieve this indicator the Bank will support the federal government to rationalize public expenditures and to strengthen fiscal management, including through the programmatic Brazil Expenditure Review and Strengthening Governance in Infrastructure, and will also support the government to restore the financial sustainability of the social security system.

==== Safety net programs ====
The social safety net programs existent in Brazil lack much governmental funding and support thus increasing the vulnerability of those that depend on it for care packages and housing. Many of the people on the list to receive these program benefits are large family households who don't have enough jobs to support the whole family, and a large portion of them are single mother households. The bank aims to support funding for these programs such as the Bolsa Familia that helps provide care package food and housing for people in need. That allocation of resources to these programs help them become more agile and efficient in effectively covering the most people in need and provide them the basic resources to live well and safe conditioned lives for them and their families.

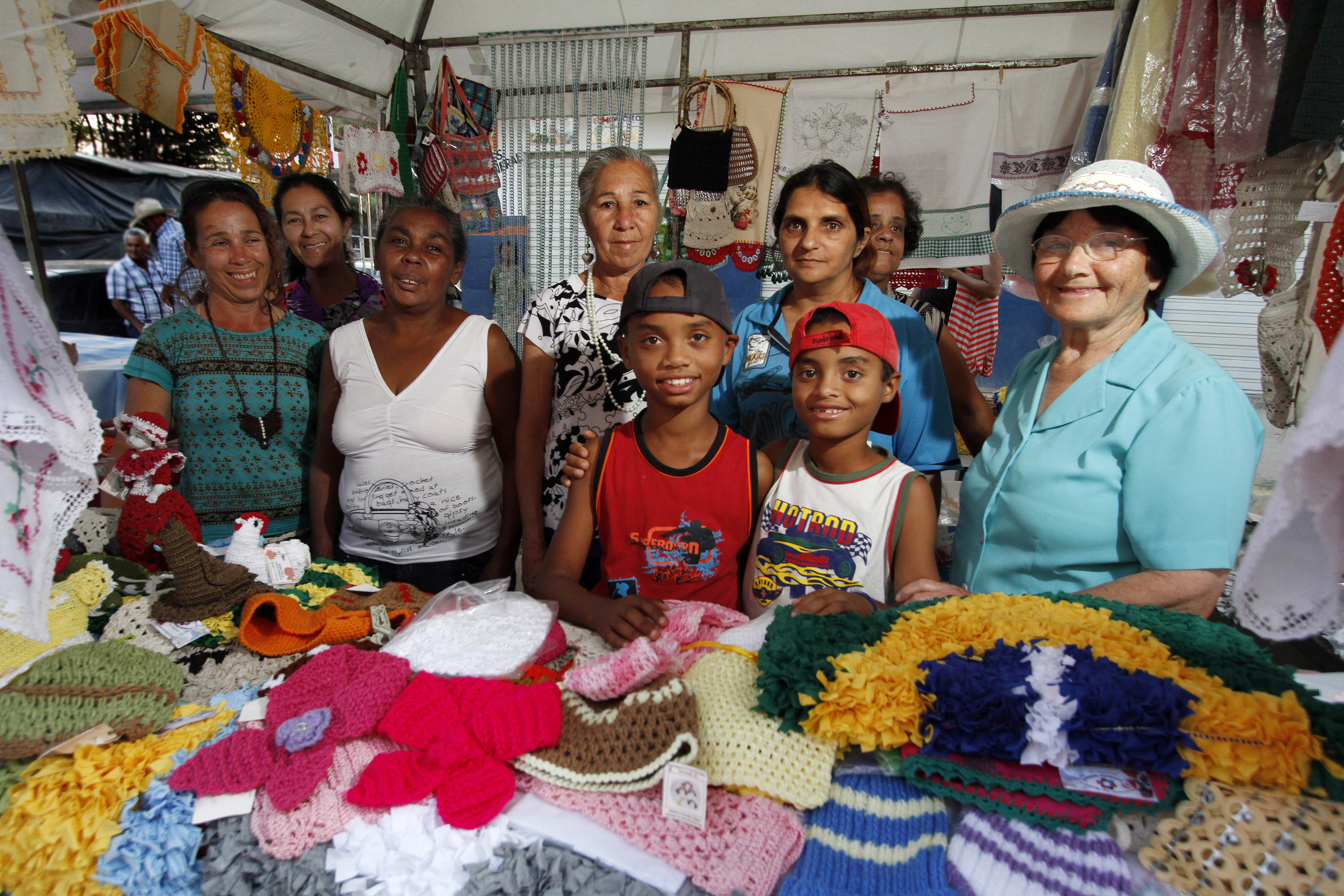
The Bolsa Familia program has served over 13.7 Million families since it was created in 2003. It serves people in extreme poverty giving them housing, educational, job and health service opportunities. The World Bank has aided much investment in programs like these to help sustain equality in Brazil and help remove thousands of families out of impoverished conditions.

==== Education ====
To lower the high rate of drop outs in the public education in secondary school, the World Bank wants to provide support in the development of the educational department in Brazil's ministry of education to facilitate the growth in opportunities for children in low income areas. Their investment will continue to support selected sub national governments in the introduction of new methods of public sector management to improve education outcomes which are expected to improve average learning scores for math and Portuguese.

==== Health ====
The World Bank will work to improve the effectiveness of health services delivery through ongoing interventions at the sub national level which will contribute to reduce premature mortality rate from the main Non-Transmissible Chronic Diseases in selected states and will contribute to improve system efficiency by reducing the percentage of hospitalization for ambulatory care sensitive conditions in selected states. In parallel, the World Bank will support the private provision of private healthcare services such as hospitals and private clinics to complement services provided by the SUS (the Brazilian publicly funded health care system), also targeting low- and middle-income populations

=== Private sector investment and production growth ===
==== Employment opportunities and business investment ====
Achieving the World Bank goals requires sustaining high rates of investment to create well-remunerated and sustainable employment. This has proved to be the principle mechanism for poverty reduction and shared prosperity in Brazil. Accelerating growth and jobs creation in Brazil is both critical in itself and highly complementary to the needed fiscal adjustment. Restoring the sustainability of public finances is a prerequisite for improved confidence and increased investment in Brazil. At the same time, accelerating growth would facilitate the return to fiscal sustainability by boosting revenue collection. The World Bank will provide financial investment and technical assistance to the federal government to support the implementation of a wide-ranging program of reforms to improve the business environment and to sub national governments as part of ongoing operations. It will commence new infrastructure bonds with an objective to raise significant private sector financing for infrastructure projects.

=== Inclusive and sustainable development ===
==== Land use ====
The World Bank has an integrated approach to building resilience of communities, ecosystems and production systems, which recognizes issues of sustainability and social inclusion as closely related. Brazil many different sets of challenges for an inclusive and sustainable development. The World Bank works to support the government in fostering more equitable economic growth, social inclusion, and efficient use of resources, focusing on interventions related to land tenure and territorial development (at national, regional and city level), management of natural resources and biodiversity, climate change mitigation and adaptation, deforestation, land degradation, and water scarcity issues.

The World Bank also supports management of natural resources in a sustainable way, combining conservation with the promotion of local and regional economic development, as well as to work with the federal and state governments to sustain the low carbon emissions trajectory in agriculture and land use to which Brazil has committed to by supporting farm holdings in the adoption of landscape management and/or sustainable agricultural practices.

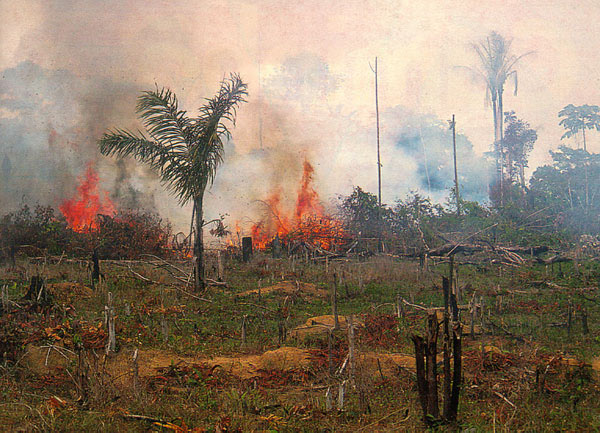
Amazon deforestation is the most pressing issue for climate change. 9,762 km^{2} were cut down between 2018 and 2019. 80% of deforestation in Brazil is caused by the cattle and meat industry.

In Brazil, the World Bank works with the preservation of the Amazon Rain forest and the sustainable cohabitation of those that use its vegetation and land. The land already used for farming and agricultural practice is also an area invested on for development, sustainability, and expansion prevention into already protected areas.

==== Water and sanitation ====
To improve access, management and efficiency of water and sanitation services in cities, the World Bank invest in the physical and institutional infrastructure to attain greater resilience to the increased variability of water supply while also focusing on pricing policies to ensure that water charges reflect provision costs. The support from the World Bank will be embedded in the broader context of water resource management and protection of scarce water resources. The bank's engagement in the water sector will continue, including at the water basin level, focused on improved water resource management, inter-stakeholder coordination, utility governance, regulation and critical investments.

There are several sanitary problems with the water supply in poor areas in Brazil, especially with the conditions to which still water sources that sit above buildings are primary places where mosquito that carry the Dengue Fever or other deadly diseases reproduce. The investment from the world bank also focuses on maintaining sanitary conditions of water supply for urban and suburban areas with emphasis on reducing the liability of still water and mosquito infestation. With current events of diseases carried by mosquitoes such as the Zika Virus caused much panic over Latin America and contagion prevention.

Many Brazilians lack a reliable water system, many even needing to ration water. Some have no sewerage system, leading to the pollution of many water sources. Taking this into account, The World Bank has funded several projects for the construction and maintenance of Brazilian municipalities' water treatment plants; one example being the Santa Cruz do Capibaribe Wastewater Treatment Plant. The World Bank attempts to increase water availability throughout its water projects and intends to decrease water rationing to the highest extent possible.

== Ongoing and active projects ==
As of December, 2019, Brazil has had a total of 540 projects supported by the World Bank. Of those 540, 44 are currently active as of December, 2019. The vast majority of the active projects are water resource sustainability projects and land management and development projects in urban, suburban and rural areas. Rural development is a sector that the World Bank deeply invests upon, with intentions to sustain economic growth and competitiveness for small farm owners and promote sustainability of land use and up to date irrigation systems.

Brazil accounts for a large percentage of world exports in agricultural products, minerals and oil. Because of Brazil's abundant amount of fertile land and unquantifiable amount of natural resources, Brazil is one of the biggest world exporters of products such as meat. The 31.7% of Brazil's economy or revenue functions off of the agricultural industry. Although Brazil is a country that runs off the agricultural industry, that does not impede from the monopolization of the market and concentration of profit from a few privatized companies. The biggest agri-producers and exporters in Brazil are JBS S.A., Ambev and BRF. All three companies dominate the market and inhibit smaller farmers and industries to thrive locally or within the country. This causes a hardship for many small family farmers that do not have the resources to produce exorbitant amounts of produce with as much exporting power as the bigger and more dominant companies. The state of Santa Catarina received a $90 million loan from the World Bank to invest in increasing the competitiveness of family farming. Resources will be redirected to small producers from a farmers' organization. Through the project, households will have access to capital, technical assistance and incentives for technological innovation, increased productivity and quality, diversification and access. The project further strengthen the provision of public services needed to increase production and make it sustainable. To this end, some infrastructure investments are also made, such as the rehabilitation of 800 miles of roads in rural areas. In addition, there is also an incentive to improve public administration in support of rural competitiveness.

This project with the state of Santa Catarina is an example of the type of work the World Bank does in rural areas with sustainable land use, rural farm production and competitiveness and development. Reusable energy and technological infrastructural work for the agricultural department is something that benefits job opportunities and facilitates a boost in the industry, inevitably creating economic growth and regional development.

The Amazon is one of the world's largest sources of oxygen and intake of greenhouse gases in the world. It is the single most naturally diverse part of the planet and at the expense of agriculture and deforestation, thousands of acres are chopped down every year. Despite many NGOs pushing for policy change, conservation and federal funding for the preservation of the rain forest, the agriculture and mining industry constantly chops down the rain forest for resources such as wood or for land used for agriculture. The largest industries in agriculture that mostly contribute to the resistance to conservation are the cattle industry and products such as soy. The World Bank has assisted Brazil in the funding of many projects led by governmental and non governmental agencies to help spread the conservation efforts.

The World Bank released a project in December 2017 called the Amazon Sustainable Landscape Project. This project is active and is set to last until December 2024. The purpose of this project is to facilitate the funding for preservation efforts of the rain forest, and to cultivate a sustainable infrastructure to cohabitate with the native vegetation and allow for its restoration and cultivation. This project wants to expand and protect over 60 million Hectares of preserved forest area, especially those bordering agricultural areas and cities. The World Bank invested $60,330,000 for this project. Rehabilitation and restoration of the forest is the second part most heavily invested on. The third part most invested on is on financing resources for the forestry and public landscape sectors to maintain the stability and efforts of the project.

One of the most recent World Bank projects in Brazil is the Brazil Climate Finance Project, which was developed in the hopes of mitigating climate change whilst providing more access of carbon credits to the private sector. Specifically, the World Bank intends to accomplish this project by granting loans to eligible companies and establishing a system for carbon reducing plans and carbon credit through Banco do Brasil. The World Bank approved this project on December 22, 2022, with a total amount of US$500 million committed to the project. The project is expected to cost about $1.9 billion, ending on 30 April 2028. This project is expected to make Carbon Credits readily available for the Brazilian Market, allowing them to purchase them to maintain a Carbon-neutral or negative status, ultimately mitigating climate change and environmental pollution.

== Achievements and successes ==
The World Bank has helped Brazil achieve several development objectives, including millions of dollars to the Health Department for sustaining quality health services for low-income neighborhoods, providing resources for secondary schools across the country, and aiding children in accessing teachers, books, and school supplies required for primary education. The Bank has helped in imrproving the quality of life in Brazil, and provided support for the federal and local governments in development programs. Additionally, the bank has invested several millions dollars for protection of environmane, and towards funding infrastructural development for efficient and safe use of land.

Brazil being one of the largest users of the World Bank, there is a strong economic reliance on the institution and its aid in providing Brazil, with its dense population and infrastructural obstacles, the necessary help to maintain its development as economic disparity, poverty, and lack of opportunity continue to grow.

== Challenges ==
The lack in growth of productivity, government funding for public services and programs, and the structural development in the departments of social services leads to a big difficulty in achieving and optimizing the effectiveness of the programs led by the World Bank. Although these challenges are prominent and the lack of regulations and enforcement occur, the World Bank works hand in hand with the government to try to reduce the ripple of corruption and the offset challenges of deterioration of the societal infrastructure and services. Fiscal imbalance is the biggest issue in Brazil and causes a disproportionate amount of disparity of opportunity for the population especially the bottom 40%. With that, the World Bank tries to enforce its influence on policy, private investment, and reduction of corporate monopoly and gains.

Brazil's income inequality, constant inflation, and ineffective government policies make it a difficult place for entrepreneurs to participate in the nation's economic system, which, in turn, has been a major reason for the involvement of the World Bank in previously mentioned areas. More specifically, Brazilian unemployment is now at 8.4% and inflation (as of April 2022) at 12.1%. These persistent issues have made it rather difficult for the World Bank to solve these complications permanently. The World Bank may invest in more long-term projects intended to decrease inflation, stimulate domestic economic growth (further increase GDP), and further mitigate income inequality, leading to a more productive and healthy Brazil.

== See also ==
- Abraham Weintraub, Brazil's current representative in the World Bank
