= Antônio Delfim Netto =

Brazilian politician (1928–2024)

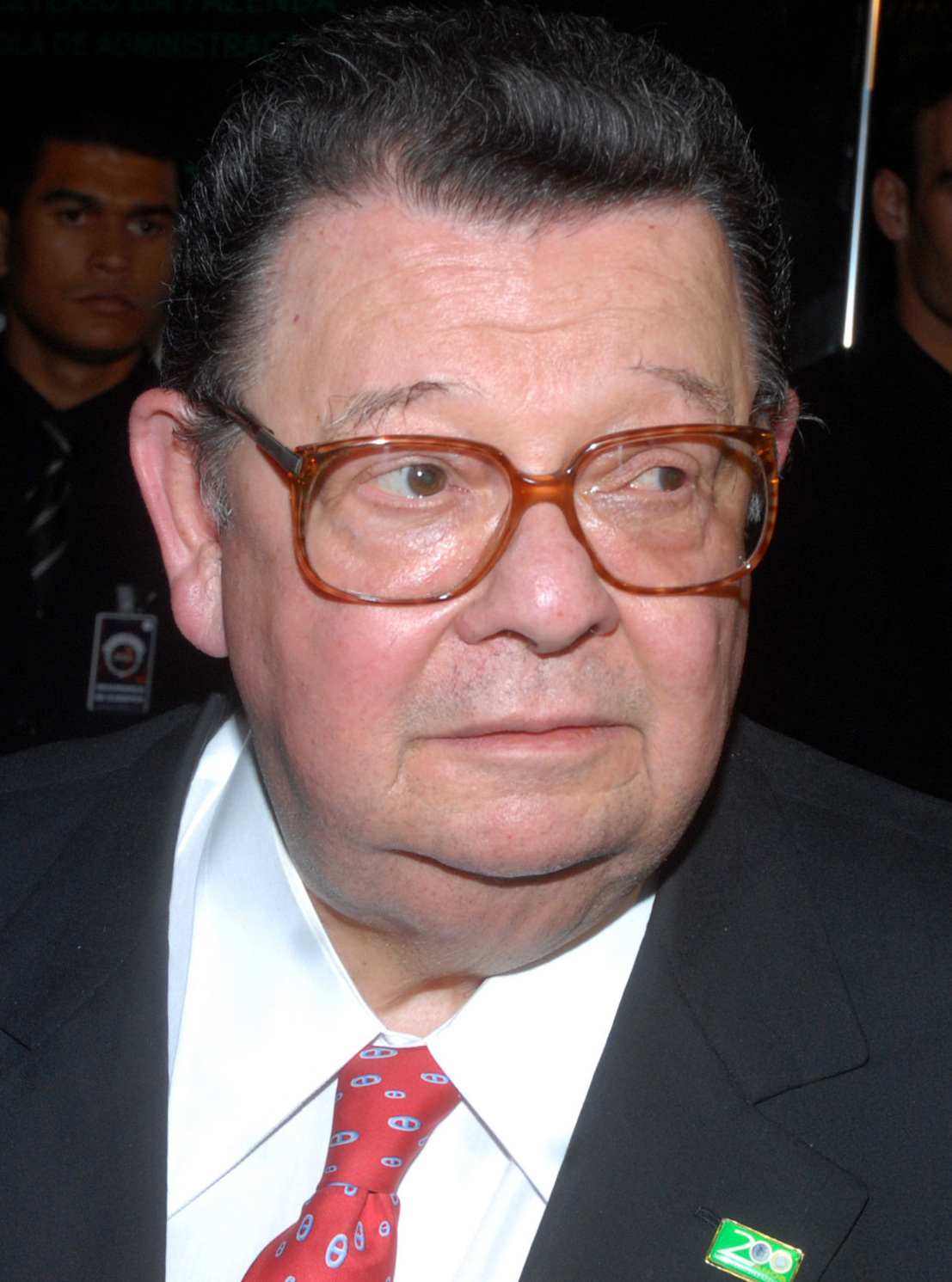
- Netto in 2008

Member of the Chamber of Deputies
- In office 1 February 1987 – 1 February 2007
- Constituency: São Paulo

Minister of the Department of Planning
- In office 15 August 1979 – 14 March 1985
- President: João Figueiredo
- Preceded by: Mário Henrique Simonsen
- Succeeded by: João Sayad

Minister of Agriculture
- In office 15 March 1979 – 15 August 1979
- President: João Figueiredo
- Preceded by: Alysson Paulinelli
- Succeeded by: Amaury Stabile

Ambassador of Brazil to France
- In office 7 February 1975 – 10 February 1978
- President: Ernesto Geisel
- Preceded by: Aurélio de Lira Tavares
- Succeeded by: Ramiro Saraiva Guerreiro

Minister of Finance
- In office 17 March 1967 – 15 March 1974
- President: Artur da Costa e Silva; Emílio Garrastazu Médici
- Preceded by: Eduardo Lopes Rodrigues
- Succeeded by: Mário Henrique Simonsen

Personal details
- Born: 1 May 1928 São Paulo, Brazilian Republic
- Died: 12 August 2024 (aged 96) São Paulo, Brazil
- Party: PP (2011–2024)
- Other political affiliations: ARENA (1965–1979); PDS (1979–1993); PPR (1993–1995); PPB (1995–2003)
- Education: School of Economics, Business and Accounting of the University of São Paulo
- Field: Monetarism; Estruturalism
- School or tradition: Monetarism

Antônio Delfim Netto (Brazilian Portuguese pronunciation: [ɐ̃ˈtoni.u dɛwˈfĩ ˈnɛtu, ɐ̃ˈtonju -]; 1 May 1928 – 12 August 2024) was a Brazilian economist, academic, and politician who served as a congressman and as Minister of Finance, Minister of Agriculture, and Minister of Planning.

Under Netto's tenure as Minister of Finance, Brazil experienced a period of unprecedented economic growth – the so-called Economic Miracle –, which was driven by a heterodox, developmentalist planning model reliant on low wages, a rapidly rising export rate, and massive inflows of foreign capital.

Netto added another layer of meaning to the "cake theory". According to him, the cake should rise before it could be shared; hence, economic growth would be an appropriate way to address the rampant inequality Brazil faced. Delfim Netto died in São Paulo on 12 August 2024, at the age of 96.

== Biography ==
Born in São Paulo to a middle-class family of Italian immigrants, Netto attended Liceu Siqueira Campos before enrolling in the School of Economics, Business and Accounting of the University of São Paulo, where he was part of the school's third intake and headed the Academic Center Visconde de Cairu (pt), graduating in 1951. The next year, he was hired as assistant professor. He earned a doctorate with a thesis on the economy of coffee, becoming a full-time professor at the University of São Paulo in 1958.

Netto worked in Carvalho Pinto's government of São Paulo and later became Minister of Finance under the state government of Laudo Natel. In 1967, president Artur da Costa e Silva invited him to work at the Ministry of Finance. In December 1968, amid the escalation of the political climate, Netto, alongside other high-profile bureaucrats, signed the Institutional Act Number.Five, a decree penned by the jurist Luís da Gama e Silva that warranted the military dictatorship extraordinary powers, culminating in a period of political repression.

== Electoral history ==
Year	Election	Party	Office	Coalition	Votes	%	Results
1986	State Elections of São Paulo	PDS	Federal Deputy	Popular Union(PDS, PFL, PDC, PPB, PMB, PND)	76,342	0.49 (#21)	Elected
1990	State Elections of São Paulo	PDS	Federal Deputy	Union for São Paulo (PDS, PTB, PDC, PRN)	142,141	0.83 (#4)	Elected
1994	State Elections of São Paulo	PPR	Federal Deputy	Força São Paulo (PP, PPR)	94,573	0.51 (#15)	Elected
1998	State Elections of São Paulo	PPB	Federal Deputy	Viva São Paulo (PPB, PFL, PL, PSL, PST, PRN)	177,912	1.14 (#10)	Elected
2002	State Elections of São Paulo	PPB	Federal Deputy	Resolve São Paulo (PPB, PL, PSDC, PTN)	131,399	0.67 (#35)	Elected
2006	State Elections of São Paulo	PMDB	Federal Deputy	PMDB - PP	38,085	0.18 (#122)	Lost

== Works ==
- Antônio Delfim Netto (1997). O Brasil pós-real: a política econômica em debate. Universidade Estadual de Campinas, Instituto de Economia. ISBN 978-85-86215-06-3.
- Crônica do Debate Interditado, 1998, Topbooks
