= José Paulo Cavalcanti Filho =

Brazilian lawyer and writer

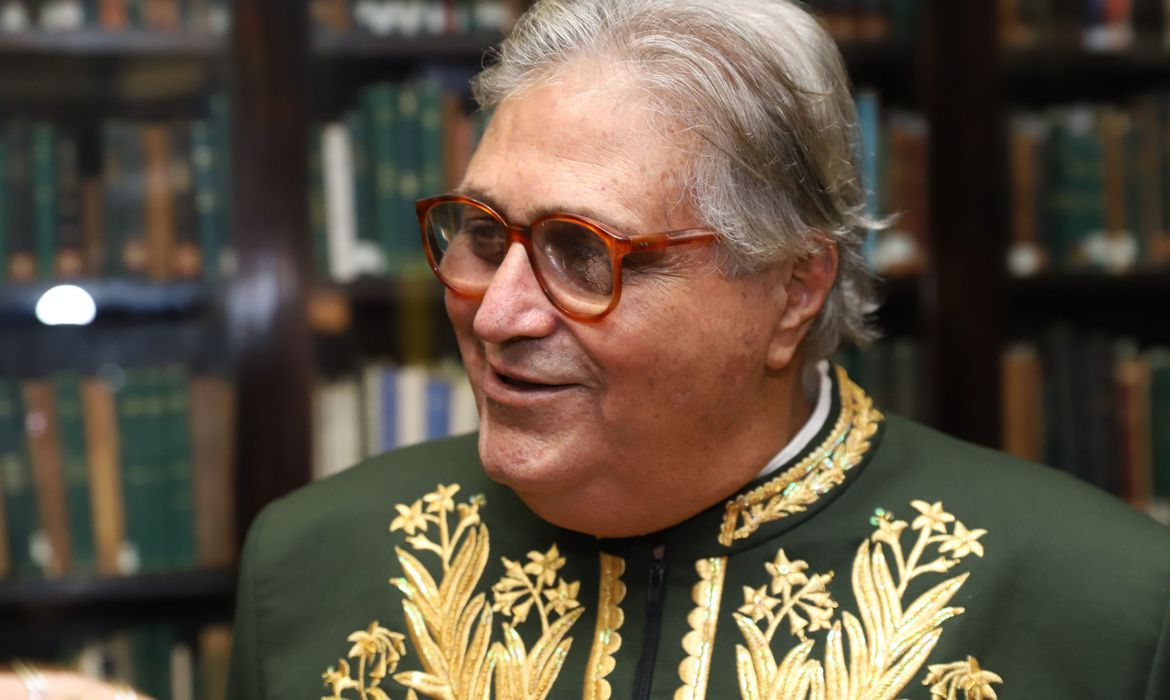
- Born: May 21, 1948 (age 77); Recife, Pernambuco, Brazil
- Occupation(s): Writer, jurist

José Paulo Cavalcanti Filho (born May 21, 1948) is a Brazilian lawyer and writer. He graduated from the Recife Faculty of Law. He was secretary general of the Ministry of Justice and (interim) Minister of Justice, under former president José Sarney. He was also President of the Administrative Council for Economic Defense (CADE), of EBN (later Empresa Brasil de Comunicação - EBC) and of the Social Communication Council (an organ of the National Congress). Consultant for UNESCO and the World Bank, he occupies chair 27 of the Pernambuco Academy of Letters. As a novelist, he has more than 18 titles written, some published abroad. He is also a deep connoisseur of the work of the Portuguese writer Fernando Pessoa. In 2012, he won the José Ermírio de Moraes award for his book Fernando Pessoa – a quasi-autobiography. It also won first place at the Book Biennial and the Jabuti Prize. He is the winner of the II Molinello Prize, in Italy. He also received awards in countries such as Romania, Israel, Spain, France, Holland, Germany, Russia, England and the United States.

He is also a member of the Brazilian Bar Association, Director of the José Paulo Cavalcanti Law Firm, the Pernambuco Lawyers Institute, and the Brazilian Lawyers Institute.

Graduated in Law from the Federal University of Pernambuco (1971). He is currently a Member of the Brazilian Bar Association, Director of the José Paulo Cavalcanti Law Firm, Member of the Pernambuco Lawyers Institute, Member of the Brazilian Lawyers Institute, Member of the Portuguese Institute of Comparative Law, Lawyer of the Brazilian Institute of Law, Member of the Pernambuco Academy of Legal Letters, Member of the Ministry of Justice, of the Pernambuco Pact 21 Council, consultant to the Secretary of Science and Technology of Rio de Janeiro, Consultant to the Secretary of Science and Technology of Pernambuco and the National Congress.

Honorary titles
Preceded by Marco Maciel	10th Academic of the 39th chair of the Brazilian Academy of Letters; 10 June 2022 – present	Incumbent
