= Carlos Decotelli =

Brazilian economist and professor (born 1949)

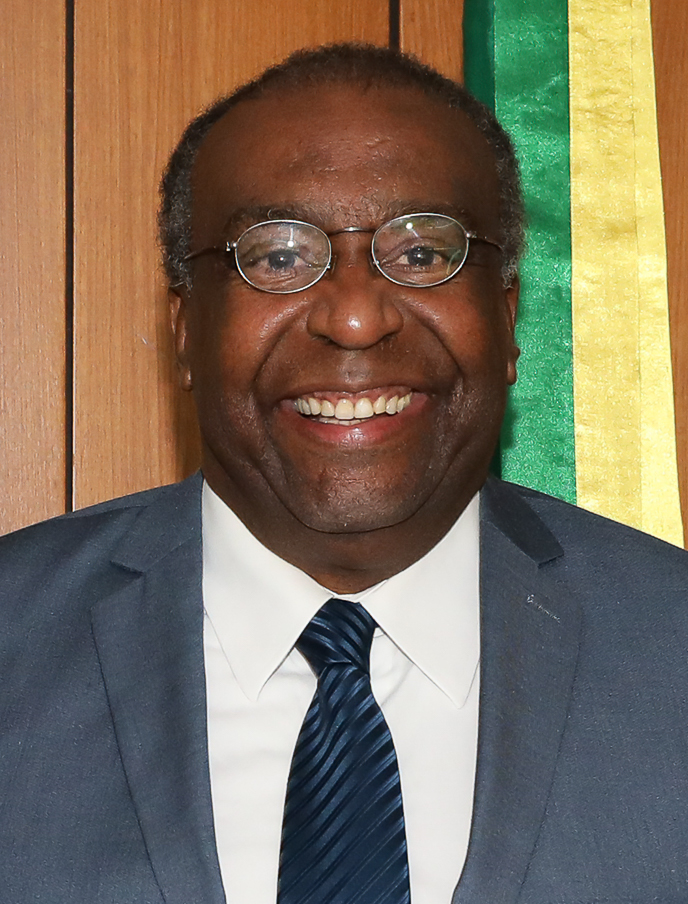

Minister of Education
- In office Never sworn in
- President: Jair Bolsonaro
- Preceded by: Abraham Weintraub

Personal details
- Born: Carlos Alberto Decotelli da Silva; 24 August 1949 (age 77) Rio de Janeiro, DF, Brazil
- Education: Rio de Janeiro State University; Getulio Vargas Foundation
- Occupation: Economist

Carlos Alberto Decotelli da Silva (born 24 August 1949) is a Brazilian economist and professor. Decotelli holds a bachelor's degree in Economic Sciences by Rio de Janeiro State University, and a master's degree in Administration by Getulio Vargas Foundation. He taught at the Federal University of Paraná.

Decotelli was part of the transition cabinet of the government of President-elect Jair Bolsonaro and, in February 2019, he was appointed for Chairman of the National Education Development Fund (FNDE), seat which he occupied until August. It is attributed to his management in the FNDE a bidding of R$ 3 billion (US$ 821,063,002.9 in 2018) suspended by the Comptroller General of Brazil for suspected irregularities.

He was also nominated Minister of Education in 2020, but resigned before taking office.

== Career ==
=== Ministry of Education ===
On 25 June 2020, Decotelli was nominated Minister of Education by president Bolsonaro, succeeding Abraham Weintraub.

Decotelli was meant to take office on 30 June 2020 but, on the previous day, following controversies regarding Decotelli's curriculum, the ceremony was indefinitely postponed.

On 30 June 2020, Decotelli delivered his resignation letter, and therefore never officially took office as minister.

== Controversies ==
=== Plagiarism on Master's dissertation ===
In his 2008 Master's dissertation on Fundação Getulio Vargas (FGV), Decotelli seemingly copied excerpts of a CVM (Securities and Exchange Commission, Portuguese: Comissão de Valores Mobiliários) report, without citing it, or mentioning it in the bibliography. Further, there were also copied sections from a 1999 book and, although the book is still mentioned in the bibliography, the copied sections weren't quoted as to indicate they weren't Decotelli's own words.

FGV said there would be an investigation to determine if there was plagiarism or not.

In response, Decotelli said the following:

Quando você escreve, tem que ter disciplina mental para escrever, revisar e mencionar o que citar. Cuidado. É possível haver distração? Sim, senhora. Hoje, a senhora tem mecanismos para verificar, [tem] softwares. Mas naquela época, pela distração... Não houve plágio, porque o plágio é quando faz 'Control + C, Control + V', e não foi isso.

Translation:

When you write, you need to have mental discipline to write, revise and mention what to cite. Caution. Is it possible there was a distraction? Yes, ma'am. Today, you have mechanisms to verify that, [there's] software. But back then, due to distraction.... There was no plagiarism, because plagiarism is when someone goes 'Control + C, Control + V', and that wasn't the case.

=== Incomplete doctorate degree ===
At the time of nomination, the president Bolsonaro presented Decotelli by the title of Doctor by the National University of Rosario, in Argentina, information publicly denied by the dean of the institution. On the same day, the press office of the Ministry of Education published the minister's diploma and stated that he completed all doctoral credits.

On 26 June 2020, Franco Bartolacci, dean of the National University of Rosario, issued a public statement on behalf of the university saying: "We see the need to clarify that Carlos Alberto Decotelli did not obtain his Doctorate title at National University of Rosario, Decotelli did not complete his doctorate degree". The dean of the university informed that Decotelli had his doctoral thesis disapproved, and the certificate of completion of credits presented by the Ministry of Education was not enough to grant him a Doctorate Degree or Doctor title by the university. After the repercussion, the Decotelli removed the mention of the thesis and the name of his course's advisor from his curriculum.

On June 27, 2020, the Communications Secretary of the Ministry of Education released a statement titled "Clarification statement regarding Minister Carlos Alberto Decotelli's academic credentials" (interpreted from Portuguese title "Nota de esclarecimento a respeito da formação acadêmica do Ministro Carlos Alberto Decotelli". The statement holds that

- Decotelli attended and passed all Doctorate credits at National University of Rosario;
- He did so without scholarship, grant, or any other form of government funding, but personally funded it;
- Having run out financial resources to continue his endeavor he left the Argentinian University and moved back to Brazil without the Academic Degree;

=== Controversy regarding Post-doc in Germany ===
Professor Decotelli's credentials mentioned a post-doc at University of Wuppertal. On 29 June 2020 the University of Wuppertal informed in a note sent to the Brazilian newspaper O Globo, that Decotelli conducted research at the university for a period of three months in 2016, but did not complete any postdoctoral program, which, in Germany, lasts two to four years - "Carlos Decotelli did not obtain a degree at our university," said Jasmine Ait-Djoudi, communication officer for Bergische Universität Wuppertal (BUW). The German university offers about 110 courses in various fields and has more than 22,000 students.

"Post-doc" for postdoctoral researcher should not be confused with a post-doctoral degree. The former is a research engagement at a university with the objective of pursuing additional research, training, or teaching in order to have better skills to pursue a career in academia, research, or any other fields, while the latter is an academic degree. Such a degree is not awarded nor used in Brazil or the Americas, and it appears that the German University statement confirms Decotelli instead of disavowing him. However, with the crescent scrutiny into his credentials and the unfavorable momentum the Wuppertal's declaration was another blow to his reputation and credibility as a candidate to the highest Education Office of the Latin American country.
