= Milton Ribeiro =

Brazilian pastor, lawyer, theologian, professor, former Minister of Education of Brazil

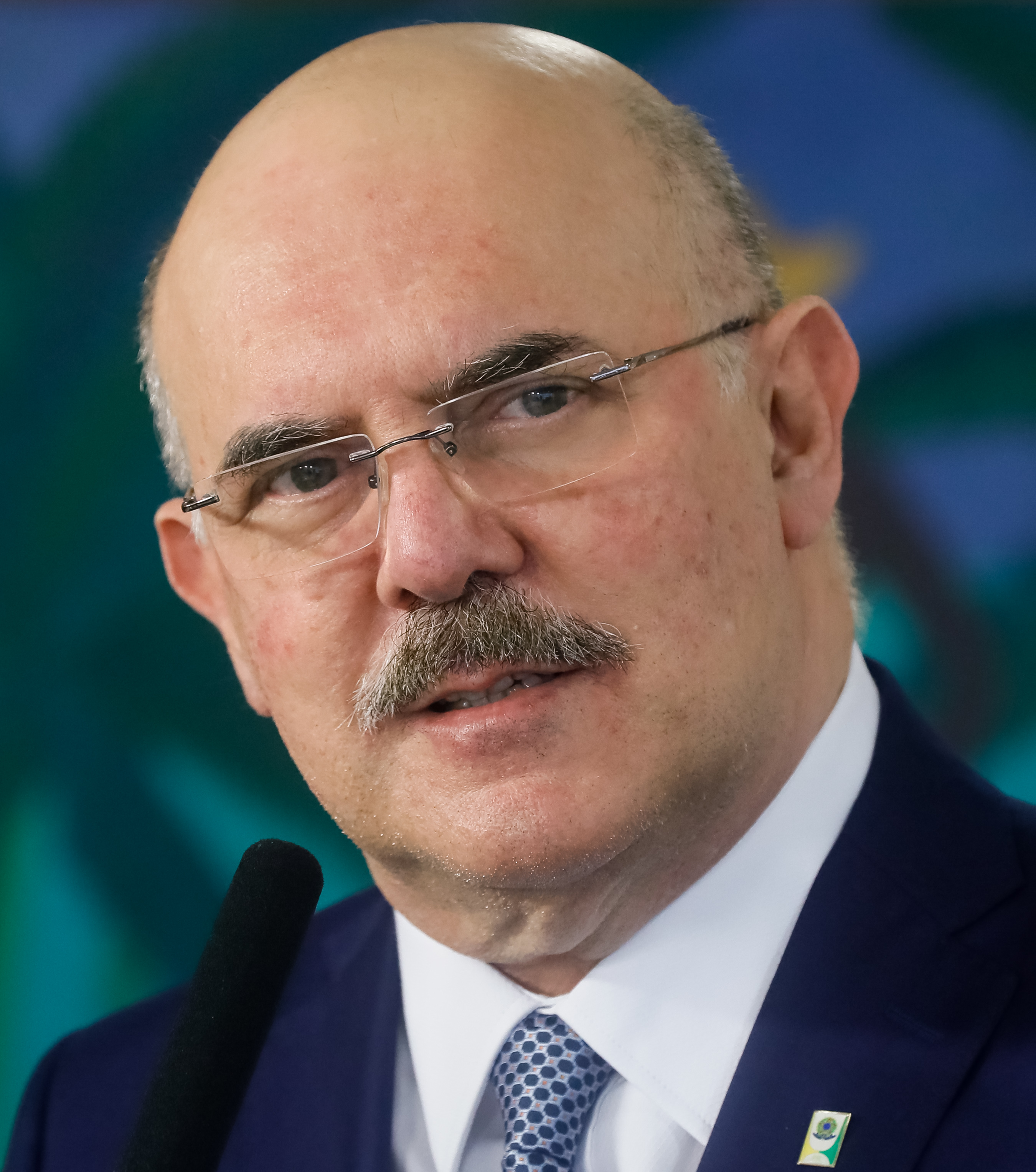

Minister of Education
- In office 16 July 2020 – 28 March 2022
- President: Jair Bolsonaro
- Preceded by: Abraham Weintraub
- Succeeded by: Victor Godoy

Personal details
- Born: 14 March 1958 (age 68) Santos, São Paulo, Brazil
- Education: Southern Presbyterian Seminary (BTh); Toledo Institution of Education (LL.B.); Mackenzie Presbyterian University (LL.M.); University of São Paulo (Ed.D.)
- Profession: Professor, pastor, lawyer

Milton Ribeiro (born 14 March 1958) is a Brazilian protestant pastor, lawyer, theologian, professor and former Minister of Education of Brazil.

== Early life and education ==
Ribeiro graduated in Theology at the Southern Presbyterian Seminary (1981) and in Laws at the Toledo Institution of Education, current Bauru University Center (1990).

He earned a Master of Laws from Mackenzie University (2001) and Doctor in Education from University of São Paulo (2006).

== Career ==
Ribeiro is a specialist in Real Estate Law at the University Center of the United Metropolitan Colleges (2000).

Called in January 1982 by the Santos Presbytery, he is a pastor at the Prayer Garden Presbyterian Church in Santos.

Ribeiro was Superintendent of the Lato Sensu Post-Graduation Programs at Mackenzie University. Acted also as Secretary of the Administration Council of MackPesquisa and as Coordinator General of Mackenzie Solidário, besides other administrative activities at Mackenzie Presbyterian Institute.He also worked as professor, serving as Dean and Vice Dean at Mackenzie University; as member of the Educational Affairs Committee at Mackenzie Institute; and as Administrative Director of Light for the Path, institution linked to the Brazilian Presbyterian Church.

Ribeiro has no profile on Scopus Author ID nor on Google Scholar, hence his h-index is zero. That means he never published anything cited by any other author.

== Ministry of Education ==
=== Context ===
Ribeiro's predecessor, Abraham Weintraub, was part of multiple controversies while he held the position of minister, including a controversial resignation which occurred on 20 June 2020. On 25 June 2020, Carlos Decotelli was nominated as Weintraub's successor, but disagreements regarding his curriculum resulted in his resignation 5 days after his nomination, before he officially took office.

=== Nomination ===
Ribeiro is the fourth Minister of Education of Jair Bolsonaro's administration. He was nominated on 10 July 2020, and officially took office on 16 July 2020.

=== Resignation ===
After an audio leak, which indicated a supposed corruption scheme of favouring cities with education money linked to Pastor's negotiations and bribes, he left the government on March 28, 2022.

== Controversies ==
=== On universities incentivizing 'unrestrained sex' ===
In 2018, Ribeiro stated that existentialism was being taught in universities, and that it was incentivizing students to have sexual intercourse disregarding who the partner is:

Para contribuir ainda mais em termos negativos para uma prática totalmente sem limites do sexo veio a questão filosófica do existencialismo, em que o momento é que importa. Não importa se é A, B, se é homem ou se é mulher, se é esse, se é aquele, se é velho, se é novo. Não interessa. O que interessa é aquele momento. [...] É isso que eles estão ensinando para os nossos filhos na universidade.

Translation:

To contribute even more negatively to a totally unrestrained practice of sex, the philosophical question of existentialism comes up, in which the moment is what matters. It doesn't matter if it's A, B, if it's a man or if it's a woman, if it's this, if it's that, if it's old, if it's young. It doesn't matter. What's important is the moment. [...] That's what they're teaching our kids in universities.

=== On birth control as a cause for sexual misconduct ===
Ribeiro also blamed birth control methods, such as the morning-after pill, for sexual misconduct:

O mundo foi perdendo a referência do que é certo e do que é errado em termos de conduta sexual. E isso foi trazendo muitas dificuldades porque agora a gravidez indesejada não é mais um risco

Translation:

The world has been losing reference of what's right and what's wrong in terms of sexual conduct. And that has been bringing a lot of trouble because now unwanted pregnancy isn't a risk anymore

=== On physical punishment of children ===
During his sermon "The Stick of Discipline" (Portuguese: A Vara da Disciplina), delivered at a Presbyterian temple in April 2016, Ribeiro argued in favor of physical punishment during a child's education. He states that "a good result will not be obtained with fair means and soft methods", that "there must be severity" and, finally, that kids "must feel pain". He follows that by saying "I'm not here teaching a class on child beating, but the stick of discipline cannot leave our homes".

On 11 July 2020 — the day after Ribeiro's nomination to the Ministry of Education — due to public outcry regarding his position, Ribeiro deleted the video recording of that sermon from his YouTube channel.

On 16 July 2020, during Ribeiro's speech while taking office, he stated, "I have never spoken of physical violence during school education and I will never defend such practices, which are part of a past we don't want to go back to".

=== On a man's role in the family ===
In another one of Ribeiro's sermons, he states that a man must impose himself in a relationship and lead the way for the family. Ribeiro defends that "when the father isn't home, the enemy attacks" and that "the man is the head of the house".

== Arrest ==
Milton Ribeiro was preventively arrested by the Federal Police on the morning of June 22, 2022. The arrest warrant cites the crimes of passive corruption, malfeasance, administrative advocacy and influence peddling in the release of funds from the National Education Development Fund.

Political offices
Preceded by Abraham Weintraub	Minister of Education; 2020–2022	Succeeded by Victor Godoy
