= Ministry of Education (Brazil) =

Brazilian state ministry

- Portuguese: Ministério da Educação
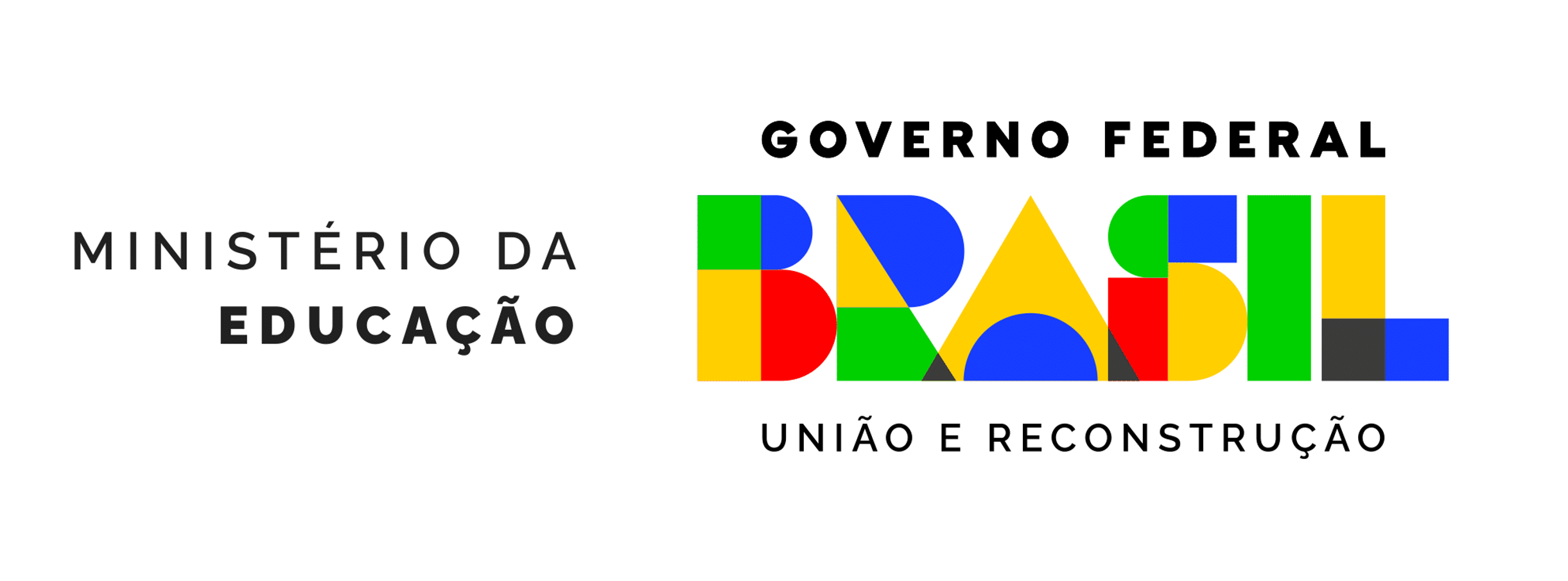

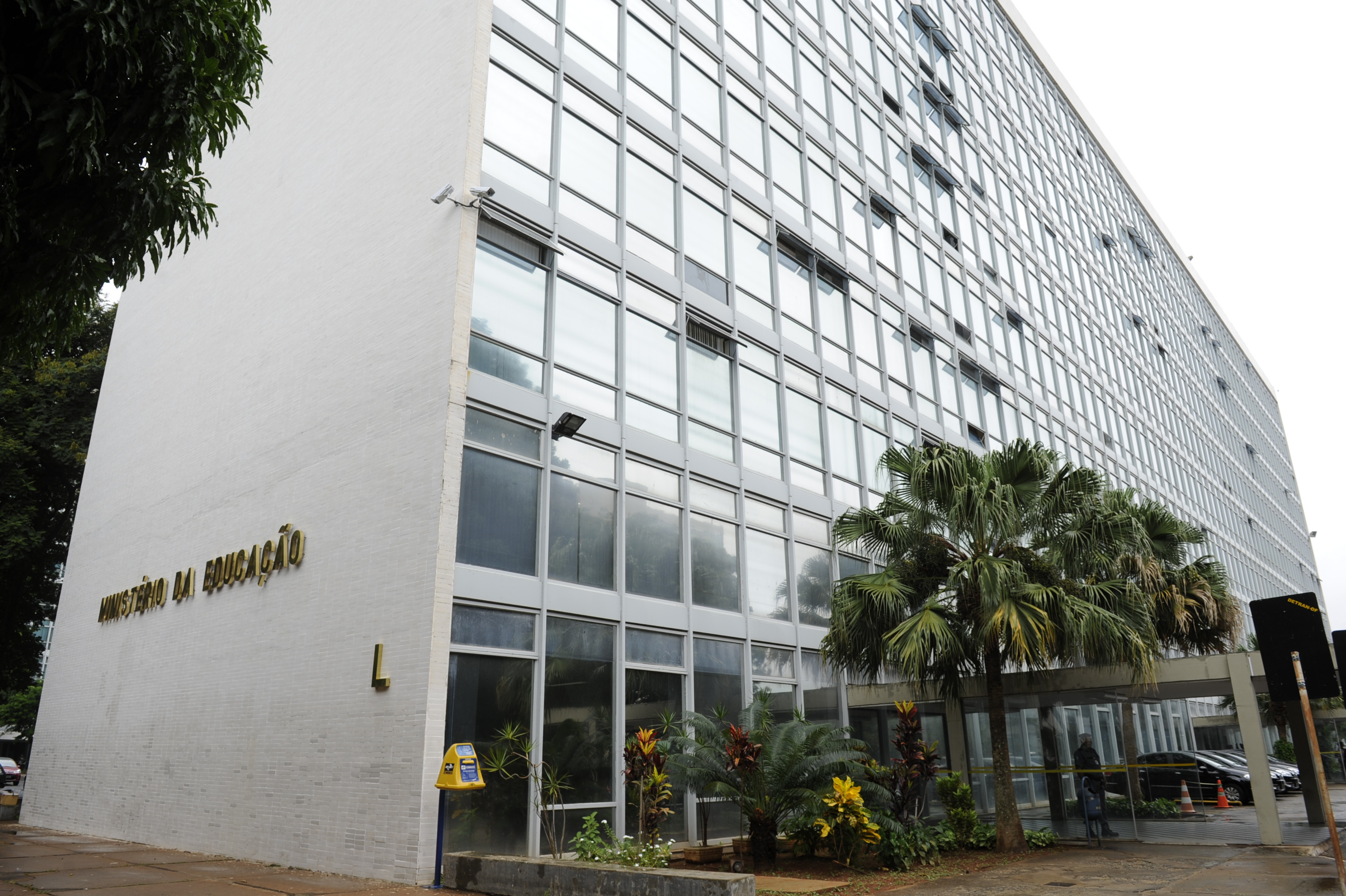
- Ministry of Education headquarters

Agency overview
- Formed: 6 December 1930; 95 years ago
- Type: Ministry
- Jurisdiction: Federal government of Brazil
- Headquarters: Esplanada dos Ministérios, Bloco L Brasília, Federal District
- Annual budget: $158.96 b BRL (2023)
- Agency executives: Leonardo Barchini, Minister; Rodolfo de Carvalho Cabral, Executive-Secretary; Kátia Schweickardt, Secretary of Basic Education; Marcus Vinicius David, Secretary of Higher Education; Marcelo Bregagnoli, Secretary of Professional and Technological Education; Marta Wendel Abramo, Secretary of Higher Education Regulation and Oversight; Gregório Durlo Grisa, Secretary of Intersection Affairs with Education Systems; Zara Figueiredo, Secretary of Continuing Education, Literacy for Youth and Adults, Diversity and Inclusion; Evânio Antônio de Araújo Júnior, Secretary of Information Management, Innovation and Evaluation of Education Policies
- Website: www.gov.br/mec/

The Ministry of Education (Portuguese: Ministério da Educação), commonly known as MEC, originates from its previous name, the Ministry of Education and Culture (Portuguese: Ministério da Educação e Cultura), is a cabinet-level federal ministry of Brazil.

Its responsibilities include coordinating national education policies and managing daily affairs, covering from early childhood education to post-graduate levels.

== History of the institution ==
Before 1930, matters related to education were the responsibility of the National Department of Education (Portuguese: Departamento Nacional do Ensino), which was part of the Ministry of Justice at the time.

In 1930, as Getúlio Vargas took office as president, the Ministry of Education and Public Health (Portuguese: Ministério da Educação e Saúde Pública) was established, taking away education matters from the Ministry of Justice.

In 1953, the ministry was split into two: the Ministry of Health, and the Ministry of Education and Culture (Portuguese: Ministério da Educação e Cultura, with the acronym MEC, which lasts to this day).

In 1985, during José Sarney's presidency, it was again split into two: the Ministry of Culture, and the Ministry of Education.

In 1992, as Itamar Franco took office as president, sports were made part of the ministry again, which was subsequently renamed Ministry of Education and Sports (Portuguese: Ministério da Educação e do Desporto).

In 1995, during Fernando Henrique Cardoso's presidency, that was once again changed, separating the Ministry of Education from the then Ministry of Sports.

The incumbent Education Minister is Leonardo Barchini.

== List of ministers ==
No.	Portrait	Minister	Took office	Left office	Time in office	Party	President
1	Francisco Campos	Francisco Campos (1891–1968)	6 December 1930	31 August 1931	268 days	Independent	Getúlio Vargas (Ind)
–	Belisário Penna	Belisário Penna (1868–1939); Acting	31 August 1931	1 December 1931	92 days	Independent	Getúlio Vargas (Ind)
2	Francisco Campos	Francisco Campos (1891–1968)	1 December 1931	15 September 1932	289 days	Independent	Getúlio Vargas (Ind)
3	Washington Pires	Washington Pires (1892–1970)	15 September 1932	23 July 1934	1 year, 311 days	Independent	Getúlio Vargas (Ind)
4	Gustavo Capanema	Gustavo Capanema (1900–1985)	23 July 1934	30 October 1945	11 years, 99 days	Independent	Getúlio Vargas (Ind)
5	Raul Leitão da Cunha	Raul Leitão da Cunha (1881–1947)	30 October 1945	31 January 1946	93 days	Independent	José Linhares (Ind)
6	Ernesto de Sousa Campos	Ernesto de Sousa Campos (1882–1970)	31 January 1946	6 December 1946	309 days	Independent	Eurico Gaspar Dutra (PSD)
7	Clemente Mariani	Clemente Mariani (1900–1981)	6 December 1946	15 May 1950	3 years, 160 days	Independent	Eurico Gaspar Dutra (PSD)
–	Eduardo Rios Filho	Eduardo Rios Filho; Acting	15 May 1950	4 August 1950	81 days	Independent	Eurico Gaspar Dutra (PSD)
8	Pedro Calmon	Pedro Calmon (1902–1985)	4 August 1950	31 January 1951	180 days	PSD	Eurico Gaspar Dutra (PSD)
9	Ernesto Simões Filho	Ernesto Simões Filho (1886–1957)	31 January 1951	25 May 1953	2 years, 114 days	Independent	Getúlio Vargas (PTB)
–	Péricles Madureira de Pinho	Péricles Madureira de Pinho (1908–1978); Acting	25 May 1953	24 June 1953	30 days	Independent	Getúlio Vargas (PTB)
10	Antônio Balbino	Antônio Balbino (1912–1992)	24 June 1953	2 July 1954	1 year, 8 days	PSD	Getúlio Vargas (PTB)
11	Edgard Santos	Edgard Santos (1894–1962)	6 July 1954	2 September 1954	58 days	Independent	Getúlio Vargas (PTB); Café Filho (PSP)
12	Cândido Mota Filho	Cândido Mota Filho (1897–1977)	2 September 1954	17 November 1955	1 year, 76 days	Independent	Café Filho (PSP)
13	Abgar Renault	Abgar Renault (1901–1995)	24 November 1955	31 January 1956	68 days	Independent	Nereu Ramos (PSD)
14	Clóvis Salgado	Clóvis Salgado (1906–1978)	31 January 1956	30 April 1956	90 days	PR	Juscelino Kubitschek (PSD)
–	Celso Brant	Celso Brant (1920–2004); Acting	30 April 1956	3 October 1956	156 days	PR	Juscelino Kubitschek (PSD)
–	Nereu Ramos	Nereu Ramos (1888–1958); Acting	3 October 1956	4 November 1956	32 days	PSD	Juscelino Kubitschek (PSD)
15	Clóvis Salgado	Clóvis Salgado (1906–1978)	4 November 1956	18 June 1959	2 years, 226 days	PR	Juscelino Kubitschek (PSD)
16	Pedro Calmon	Pedro Calmon (1902–1985)	18 June 1959	16 June 1960	364 days	PSD	Juscelino Kubitschek (PSD)
–	José Pedro Ferreira da Costa	José Pedro Ferreira da Costa (1900–1971); Acting	17 June 1960	24 June 1960	7 days	Independent	Juscelino Kubitschek (PSD)
17	Pedro Paulo Penido	Pedro Paulo Penido (1904–1967)	1 July 1960	17 October 1960	108 days	Independent	Juscelino Kubitschek (PSD)
18	Clóvis Salgado	Clóvis Salgado (1906–1978)	18 October 1960	31 January 1961	105 days	PR	Juscelino Kubitschek (PSD)
19	Brígido Fernandes Tinoco	Brígido Fernandes Tinoco (1910–1982)	31 January 1961	25 August 1961	206 days	PSD	Jânio Quadros (PTN)

No.	Portrait	Minister	Took office	Left office	Time in office	Party	Prime Minister
20	Antônio Ferreira de Oliveira Brito	Antônio Ferreira de Oliveira Brito (1908–1997)	8 September 1961	12 July 1962	307 days	PSD	Tancredo Neves (PSD)
21	Roberto Lira	Roberto Lira (1902–1982)	12 July 1962	14 September 1962	64 days	Independent	Brochado da Rocha (PSD)
22	Darcy Ribeiro	Darcy Ribeiro (1922–1997)	14 September 1962	24 January 1963	132 days	PCB	Hermes Lima (PTB)

No.	Portrait	Minister	Took office	Left office	Time in office	Party	President
23	Teotônio Monteiro de Barros	Teotônio Monteiro de Barros (1901–1974)	24 January 1963	18 June 1963	145 days	Independent	João Goulart (PTB)
24	Paulo de Tarso Santos	Paulo de Tarso Santos (1926–2019)	18 June 1963	21 October 1963	125 days	PDC	João Goulart (PTB)
–	Júlio Furquim Sambaqui	Júlio Furquim Sambaqui (1906–1982); Acting	21 October 1963	6 April 1964	168 days	Independent	João Goulart (PTB)
25	Luís Antônio da Gama e Silva	Luís Antônio da Gama e Silva (1913–1979)	6 April 1964	15 April 1964	9 days	UDN	Ranieri Mazzilli (PSD)
26	Flávio Suplicy de Lacerda	Flávio Suplicy de Lacerda (1903–1983)	15 April 1964	10 January 1966	1 year, 270 days	Independent	Castelo Branco (ARENA)
27	Pedro Aleixo	Pedro Aleixo (1901–1975)	10 January 1966	30 June 1966	171 days	ARENA	Castelo Branco (ARENA)
28	Raymyndio Moniz de Aragão	Raymyndio Moniz de Aragão (1912–2001)	30 June 1966	4 October 1966	0 days	Independent	Castelo Branco (ARENA)
–	Guilherme Canedo de Magalhães	Guilherme Canedo de Magalhães; Acting	4 October 1966	15 March 1967	162 days	Independent	Castelo Branco (ARENA)
29	Tarso Dutra	Tarso Dutra (1914–1983)	15 March 1967	30 October 1969	0 days	ARENA	Costa e Silva (ARENA); Military Junta of 1969 (Military junta)
30	Jarbas Passarinho	Jarbas Passarinho (1920–2016)	3 November 1969	15 March 1974	4 years, 132 days	ARENA	Emílio Garrastazu Médici (ARENA)
31	Ney Braga	Ney Braga (1917–2000)	15 March 1974	30 May 1978	4 years, 76 days	ARENA	Ernesto Geisel (ARENA)
32	Euro Brandão	Euro Brandão (1924–2000)	30 May 1978	15 March 1979	289 days	Independent	Ernesto Geisel (ARENA)
33	Eduardo Portella	Eduardo Portella (1932–2017)	15 March 1979	26 November 1980	0 days	Independent	João Figueiredo (ARENA)
34	Rubem Carlos Ludwig	Rubem Carlos Ludwig (1926–1989)	26 November 1980	24 August 1982	1 year, 271 days	Independent	João Figueiredo (PDS)
35	Esther Figueiredo Ferraz	Esther Figueiredo Ferraz (1915–2008)	24 August 1982	15 March 1985	2 years, 203 days	Independent	João Figueiredo (PDS)
36	Marco Maciel	Marco Maciel (1940–2021)	15 March 1985	14 February 1986	336 days	PFL	José Sarney (MDB)
37	Jorge Bornhausen	Jorge Bornhausen (born 1937)	14 February 1986	5 October 1987	1 year, 233 days	PFL	José Sarney (MDB)
–	Aloísio Guimarães Sotero	Aloísio Guimarães Sotero; Acting	6 October 1987	30 October 1987	24 days	Independent	José Sarney (MDB)
38	Hugo Napoleão	Hugo Napoleão (born 1943)	30 October 1987	16 January 1989	1 year, 78 days	PFL	José Sarney (MDB)
39	Carlos Corrêa Sant'anna	Carlos Corrêa Sant'anna (1931–2003)	16 January 1989	15 March 1990	1 year, 58 days	MDB	José Sarney (MDB)
40	Carlos Chiarelli	Carlos Chiarelli (born 1940)	15 March 1990	21 August 1991	1 year, 159 days	PFL	Fernando Collor (PRN)
41	José Goldemberg	José Goldemberg (born 1928)	21 August 1991	4 August 1992	349 days	Independent	Fernando Collor (PRN)
42	Eraldo Tinoco	Eraldo Tinoco (1943–2008)	4 August 1992	1 October 1992	58 days	PFL	Fernando Collor (PRN)
43	Murílio de Avellar Hingel	Murílio de Avellar Hingel (1933–2023)	1 October 1992	1 January 1995	2 years, 92 days	Independent	Itamar Franco (MDB)
44	Paulo Renato Souza	Paulo Renato Souza (1945–2011)	1 January 1995	1 January 2003	8 years, 0 days	PSDB	Fernando Henrique Cardoso (PSDB)
45	Cristovam Buarque	Cristovam Buarque (born 1944)	1 January 2003	27 January 2004	1 year, 26 days	PT	Luiz Inácio Lula da Silva (PT)
46	Tarso Genro	Tarso Genro (born 1947)	27 January 2004	29 July 2005	1 year, 183 days	PT	Luiz Inácio Lula da Silva (PT)
47	Fernando Haddad	Fernando Haddad (born 1963)	29 July 2005	23 January 2012	6 years, 178 days	PT	Luiz Inácio Lula da Silva (PT); Dilma Rousseff (PT)
48	Aloizio Mercadante	Aloizio Mercadante (born 1954)	24 January 2012	2 February 2014	2 years, 9 days	PT	Dilma Rousseff (PT)
49	José Henrique Paim	José Henrique Paim (born 1966)	2 February 2014	1 January 2015	333 days	PT	Dilma Rousseff (PT)
50	Cid Gomes	Cid Gomes (born 1963)	1 January 2015	18 March 2015	76 days	PDT	Dilma Rousseff (PT)
–	Luiz Cláudio Costa	Luiz Cláudio Costa; Acting	18 March 2015	6 April 2015	19 days	Independent	Dilma Rousseff (PT)
51	Renato Janine Ribeiro	Renato Janine Ribeiro (born 1949)	6 April 2015	2 October 2015	179 days	Independent	Dilma Rousseff (PT)
52	Aloizio Mercadante	Aloizio Mercadante (born 1954)	2 October 2015	12 May 2016	223 days	PT	Dilma Rousseff (PT)
53	Mendonça Filho	Mendonça Filho (born 1966)	12 May 2016	6 April 2018	1 year, 329 days	DEM	Michel Temer (MDB)
54	Rossieli Soares	Rossieli Soares (born 1978)	6 April 2018	31 December 2018	269 days	Independent	Michel Temer (MDB)
55	Ricardo Vélez Rodríguez	Ricardo Vélez Rodríguez (born 1943)	1 January 2019	8 April 2019	97 days	Independent	Jair Bolsonaro (PSL)
56	Abraham Weintraub	Abraham Weintraub (born 1971)	8 April 2019	20 June 2020	1 year, 73 days	Independent	Jair Bolsonaro (PSL)
–	Vacant	Vacant; Acting	20 June 2020	16 July 2020	26 days	Vacant	Jair Bolsonaro (Ind)
57	Milton Ribeiro	Milton Ribeiro (born 1958)	16 July 2020	28 March 2022	1 year, 255 days	Independent	Jair Bolsonaro (Ind)
58	Victor Godoy	Victor Godoy (born 1981)	28 March 2022	31 December 2022	278 days	Independent	Jair Bolsonaro (PL)
59	Camilo Santana	Camilo Santana (born 1968)	1 January 2023	1 April 2026	3 years, 90 days	PT	Luiz Inácio Lula da Silva (PT)
60	Leonardo Barchini	Leonardo Barchini (born 1976)	2 April 2026	Incumbent	192 days	Independent	Luiz Inácio Lula da Silva (PT)

== See also ==
- Instituto Benjamin Constant
- Universities and higher education in Brazil
- Undergraduate education in Brazil
- Graduate degrees in Brazil
- Bachelor's degree in Brazil
- CNPq (National Council for Scientific and Technological Development)
- Lattes Platform
- Brazilian science and technology
- Coordenadoria de Aperfeiçoamento de Pessoal de Nível Superior (CAPES)
- INEP (National Institute for Research on Education)
- New Brazilian secondary education

== Bibliography ==
- "História - Ministério da Educação" [History - Ministry of Education]. Portal Ministério da Educação (in Brazilian Portuguese).
