= Cândido Mota Filho =

Brazilian writer and politician

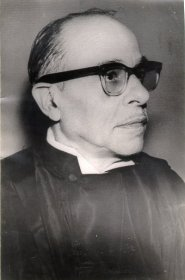
- Born: September 16, 1897; São Paulo, São Paulo, Brazil
- Died: February 4, 1977 (aged 79); São Paulo, São Paulo, Brazil
- Education: Faculty of Law of São Paulo
- Occupations: Lawyer, professor, judge, journalist, translator
- Notable work: A vida de Eduardo Prado (1967)
- Movement: Modernism
- Awards: Prêmio Jabuti (1967, 1972)

Cândido Mota Filho (September 16, 1897 – February 4, 1977) was a Brazilian writer, jurist, professor, and politician. A key-figure of the literary movement known as verde-amarelismo, he served as Minister of the Supreme Federal Court and as Minister of Education.

As a writer, Filho explored many genres, including biography, memoir, and essay, and worked with areas such as law, psychology, literary criticism, and political science.

== Biography ==
Born in São Paulo into a middle-class family, Mota Filho was the son of a politician. He graduated from the Faculty of Law of São Paulo and soon became active in his city's literary circles, participating in the 1922 Modern Art Week. In the late 1920s, together with Cassiano Ricardo, Menotti del Picchia, and Plínio Salgado, he founded the movement known as verde-amarelismo, a conservative and nationalist strand of modernism that sought to reinterpret Brazil from a nativist perspective, rejecting European and other foreign elements.

In 1929, Mota Filho founded the Ação Nacional do PRP, a current inside the Paulista Republican Party inspired by the nationalist thought of Alberto Torres. In 1932, he was involved in the Constitutionalist Revolution, integrating the office of the governor of São Paulo, Pedro Manuel de Toledo. Despite having frequented the Society of Political Studies (pt), which would evolve into the Brazilian Integralist Action, Mota Filho was not affiliated with the movement. His writings were nonetheless influential within integralist circles, drawing commentary from Plínio Salgado.

Following the Integralist Uprising, he was arrested for his intellectual and personal relations with the movement and its members. In the early 1940s, he worked at the Department of Press and Propaganda, an agency responsible for censorship and diffusion of propaganda for the Estado Novo dictatorship.

In 1954, Mota Filho was appointed Minister of Education under Café Filho. In 1956, he was appointed Minister of the Supreme Federal Court by Juscelino Kubitschek. In 1960, he was elected to the Brazilian Academy of Letters.

== Works ==
- Romantismo: Introdução ao estudo do pensamento nacional (1926)
- A função de punir (1928)
- Alberto Torres e o tema da nossa geração (1931)
- Introdução ao estudo da política moderna (1935)
- A defesa da infância contra o crime (1936)
- Erasmo de Roterdã (1936)
- Da premeditação (1937)
- Rui Barbosa, esse desconhecido (1937)
- Alcântara Machado (1938)
- Do estado de necessidade (1939)
- Sílvio Romero (1941)
- Uma grande vida: biografia de Bernardino de Campos (1941)
- O Poder Executivo e as ditaduras constitucionais (1942)
- O caminho das três agonias: Álvares de Azevedo, Machado de Assis e padre Antônio Feijó (1944)
- Camões (1946)
- A declaração de direitos (1947)
- Castro Alves (1947)
- Basílio Machado (1948)
- Goethe (1949)
- O conteúdo político das constituições (1950)
- Pela educação (1952)
- Doutrinas políticas contemporâneas (1952)
- Notas de um constante leitor (1958)
- A vida de Eduardo Prado (1967)
- Ensaio sobre a timidez (1969)
- Contagem regressiva (1972)
- Dias lidos e vividos (1977)
