= Rossieli Soares =

Brazilian politician (born 1978)

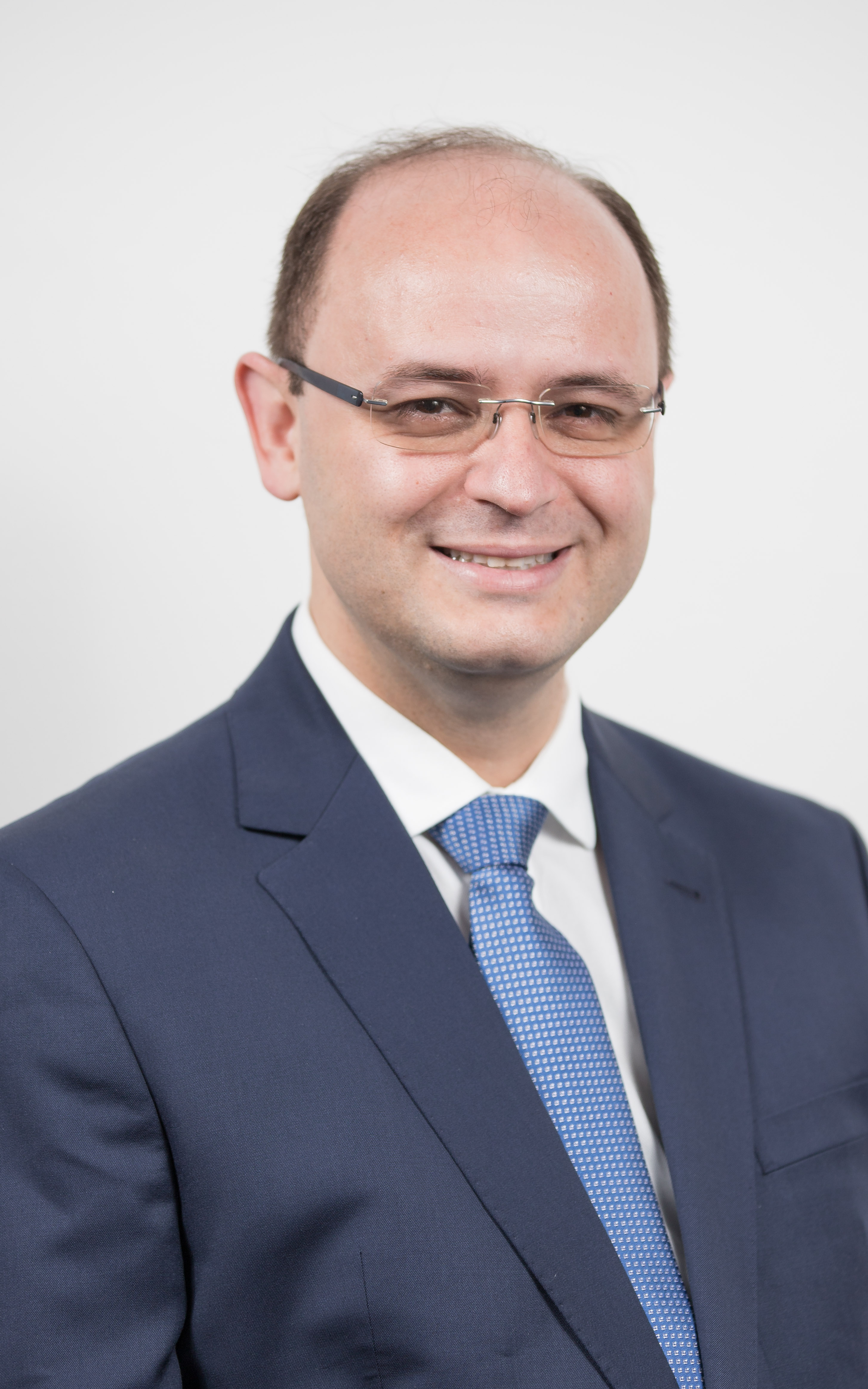
- Soares in 2019

Minister of Education
- In office 10 April 2018 – 31 December 2018
- President: Michel Temer
- Preceded by: Mendonça Filho
- Succeeded by: Ricardo Vélez Rodríguez

Personal details
- Born: 9 October 1978 (age 47)
- Party: Brazilian Social Democracy Party (since 2022)

Rossieli Soares da Silva (born 9 October 1978) is a Brazilian politician serving as secretary of education of Minas Gerais since 2025. From 2023 to 2025, he served as secretary of education of Pará. From 2019 to 2022, he served as secretary of education of São Paulo. From April to December 2018, he served as minister of education of Brazil. From 2012 to 2016, he served as secretary of education of Amazonas.
