= Ricardo Vélez Rodríguez =

Former Minister of Education of Brazil (born 1943)

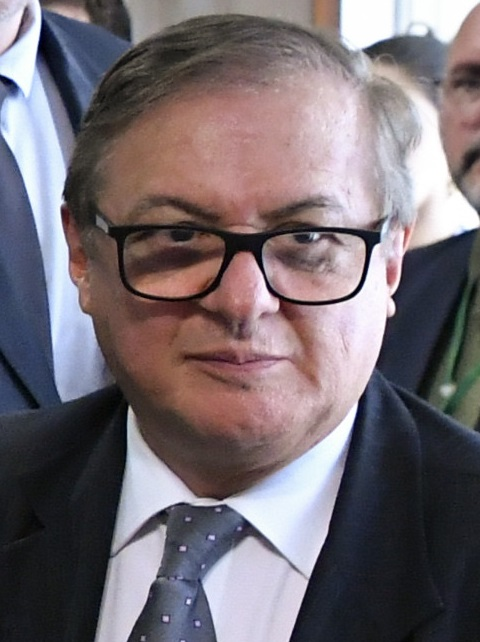

Minister of Education
- In office 1 January 2019 – 8 April 2019
- President: Jair Bolsonaro
- Preceded by: Rossieli Soares
- Succeeded by: Abraham Weintraub

Personal details
- Born: 15 November 1943 (age 82) Bogotá, Colombia
- Education: Pontifical Xavierian University; Pontifical Catholic University of Rio de Janeiro; Gama Filho University

Ricardo Vélez Rodríguez (born 15 November 1943) is a Colombian-Brazilian philosopher and former Minister of Education of Brazil.

== Biography ==
Rodríguez was born in 1943 in Bogotá, Colombia. He received a degree in Philosophy from the Pontifical Xavierian University in 1963, and in 1967 received a degree in Theology from the Bogotá Seminar. In 1974 he received a master's degree from the Pontifical Catholic University of Rio de Janeiro and in 1982 received a doctorate in philosophy from Universidade Gama Filho.

He is a professor of religion at the Federal University of Juiz de Fora. Rodríguez is a fierce critic of the Workers' Party, the Brazilian National High School Exam, and is a proponent of the "Escola sem Partido" ("Nonpartisan School") project. His political views have been described as far-right. He had been recommended by the philosopher Olavo de Carvalho.

On 22 November 2018, Brazilian President-elect Jair Bolsonaro announced that Rodríguez would serve as Brazil's Minister of Education in the coming administration. He took office on 1 January 2019.

Political offices
Preceded by Rossieli Soares	Minister of Education; 2019	Succeeded by Abraham Weintraub
