= Marco Maciel =

Vice President of Brazil from 1995 to 2003 (1940–2021)

His Excellency Marco Maciel
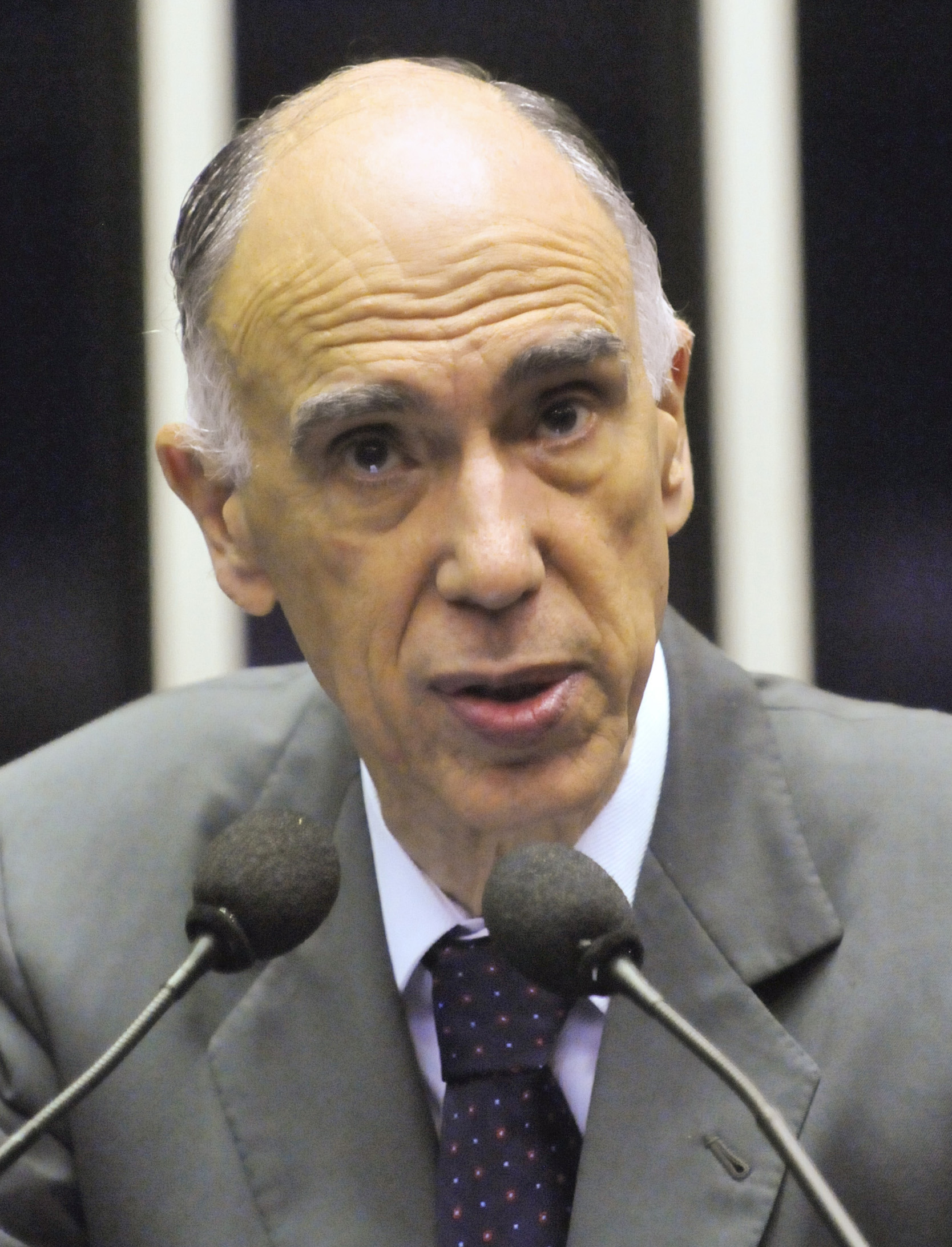
- Maciel in 2010

22nd Vice President of Brazil
- In office 1 January 1995 – 1 January 2003
- President: Fernando Henrique Cardoso
- Preceded by: Itamar Franco
- Succeeded by: José Alencar
Executive offices
Chief of Staff of the Presidency
In office 14 February 1986 – 30 April 1987
President	José Sarney
Preceded by	José Hugo Castelo Branco
Succeeded by	Ronaldo Costa Couto
Minister of Education
In office 15 March 1985 – 14 February 1986
President	José Sarney
Preceded by	Esther Ferraz
Succeeded by	Jorge Bornhausen
Governor of Pernambuco
In office 15 March 1979 – 15 May 1982
Lieutenant	Roberto Magalhães
Preceded by	Moura Cavalcanti
Succeeded by	José Muniz Ramos
Legislative offices
Senator for Pernambuco
In office 1 February 2003 – 1 February 2011
Preceded by	Carlos Wilson
Succeeded by	Armando Monteiro
In office 30 April 1987 – 31 December 1994
Preceded by	Nivaldo Machado
Succeeded by	Joel de Hollanda
In office 1 February 1983 – 15 March 1985
Preceded by	Marcos Freire
Succeeded by	Nivaldo Machado
President of the Chamber of Deputies
In office 28 February 1977 – 2 February 1979
Preceded by	Célio Borja
Succeeded by	Flávio Marcílio
Member of the Chamber of Deputies
In office 1 February 1971 – 1 February 1979
Constituency	Pernambuco
State Deputy of Pernambuco
In office 1 February 1967 – 1 February 1971
Constituency	At-large

Personal details
- Born: Marco Antônio de Oliveira Maciel; 21 July 1940 Recife, Pernambuco, Brazil
- Died: 12 June 2021 (aged 80) Brasília, Federal District, Brazil
- Party: ARENA (1966–1979); PDS (1980–1984); DEM (1985–2021)
- Spouse: Anna Maria Ferreira (m. 1966)
- Children: 3
- Parents: José do Rego Maciel (father); Carmen Sílvia Cavalcanti de Oliveira (mother)
- Education: Federal University of Pernambuco
- Profession: Lawyer, professor
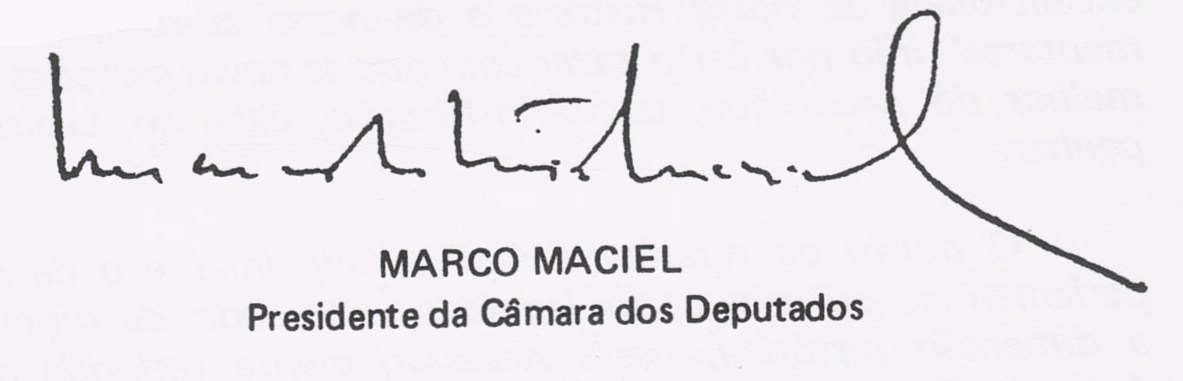
- Signature

Marco Antônio de Oliveira Maciel (21 July 1940 – 12 June 2021) was a Brazilian politician, lawyer, and law school professor who served as the 22nd vice president of Brazil from 1 January 1995 to 1 January 2003, twice elected on the same ticket as President Fernando Henrique Cardoso in the 1994 and 1998 general elections. He was a founder of the conservative PFL party.

Prior to his vice presidency, he was the President of the Chamber of Deputies (1977–1979), Governor of Pernambuco (1979–1982), Minister of Education (1985–1986) and Chief of President Sarney's cabinet (1986–1987). Maciel returned to the senate following his vice presidency, until he was defeated in 2010.

Maciel was elected to the 39th Chair of the Brazilian Academy of Letters (ABL) in 2003.

== Personal life ==
Marco Maciel was married to Ana Maria Maciel and had three sons. He was also a practising Roman Catholic.

He died on 12 June 2021 from multiple organ failure, due to post COVID-19 complications.

Honorary titles
Preceded by Roberto Marinho	9th Academic of the 39th chair of the Brazilian Academy of Letters; 10 November 2003 – 12 June 2021	Succeeded by José Paulo Cavalcanti Filho
Political offices
Preceded by Célio Borja	President of the Chamber of Deputies; 1977–1979	Succeeded by Flávio Marcílio
Preceded by Moura Cavalcanti	Governor of Pernambuco; 1979–1982	Succeeded by José Muniz Ramos
Preceded by Esther de Figueiredo Ferraz	Minister of Education; 1985–1986	Succeeded by Jorge Bornhausen
Preceded by José Hugo Castelo Branco	Chief of Staff of the Presidency; 1986–1987	Succeeded by Ronaldo Costa Couto
Vacant Title last held by Itamar Franco	Vice President of Brazil; 1995–2003	Succeeded by José Alencar
