= Mackenzie Evangelical College of Paraná =

Private college in Curitiba, Brazil

- Faculdade Evangélica Mackenzie do Paraná
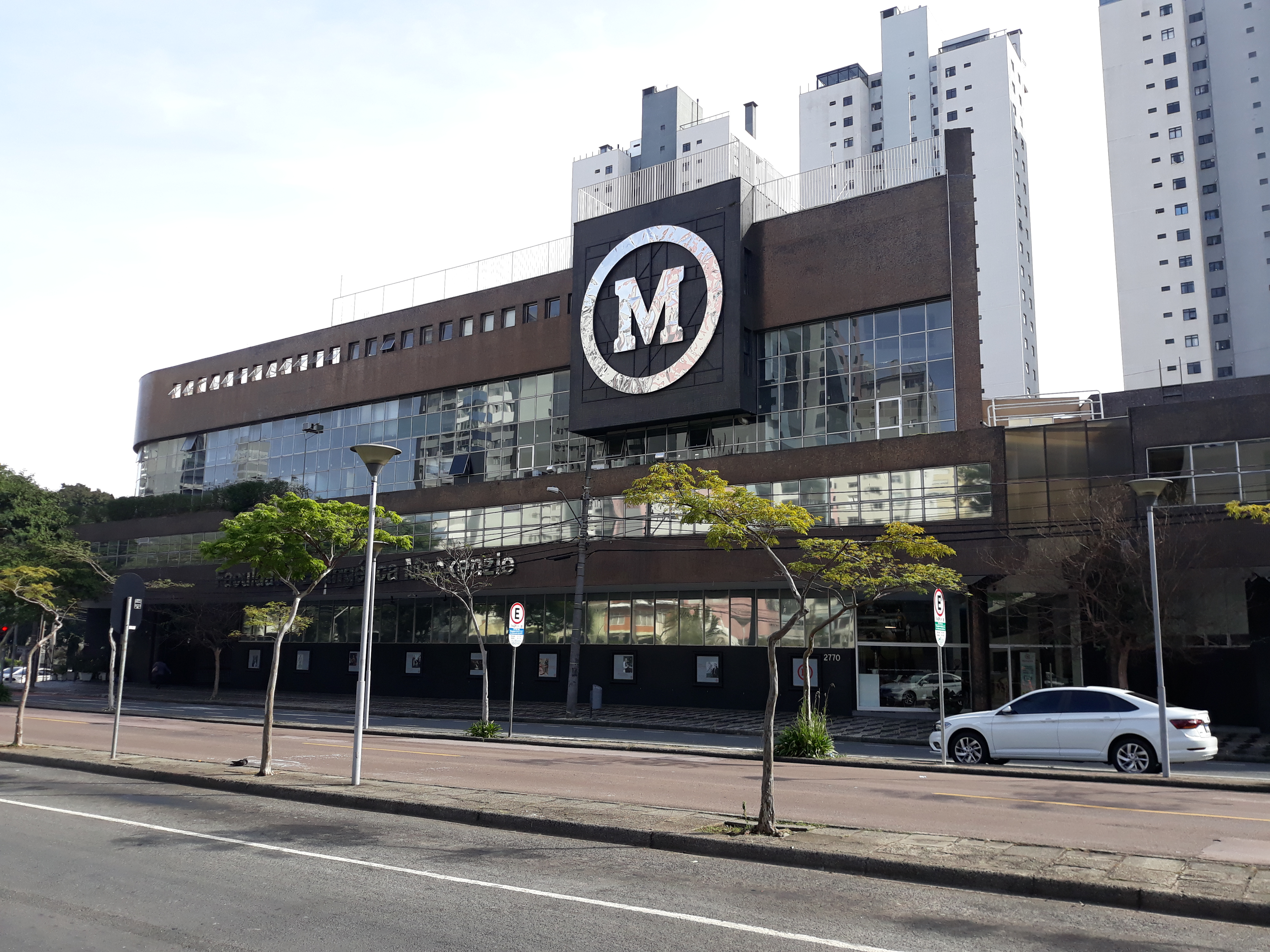
- Former names: Evangelical College of Paraná Evangelical Medicine College of Paraná
- Type: Private
- Established: 1968
- Founders: Daniel Egg
- Parent institution: Mackenzie Presbyterian Institute
- Total staff: 42
- Students: 728
- Location: Rua Padre Anchieta, 2770, Curitiba, Paraná, Brazil; 25°26′7.33″S 49°18′21.74″W
- Campus: Urban
- Colours: Red
- Website: https://www.mackenzie.br/faculdades/curitiba/home/
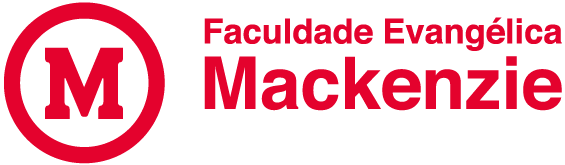

The Mackenzie Evangelical College of Paraná is a private higher education institution located in Curitiba, Paraná, Brazil. Founded in 1968, it offers graduate and postgraduate programs in the healthcare field. The Mackenzie Evangelical University Hospital, founded in 1959, containing 475 beds, is the college’s teaching hospital.

== History ==
The Mackenzie Evangelical College of Paraná was founded in 1968, after Dr. Daniel Egg’s plans for the establishment of a new medical school were presented to the Mackenzie Evangelical University Hospital, which, by partnering the Beneficent Evangelical Society and politicians, implemented them. 45 students were admitted for the class of 1974.

Lectures began on January 2, 1969, hosted at the college’s first building, at Alameda Princesa Izabel, where the Mackenzie Evangelical University Hospital pediatrics unit is currently located.

In 1987, the first edition of the Conclave Científico dos Acadêmicos de Medicina - CONCIAM (Medical Students’ Scientific Congress) was organized by the college’s professors and students.

During the year of 1994, the institution developed and implemented several new stricto sensu and lato sensu postgraduate courses, which currently maintain partnerships with the Boston Children's Hospital and the Brigham and Women’s Hospital. Furthermore, in the same year, the establishment inaugurated the Instituto de Pesquisas Médicas – IPEM (Medical Research Institute) building, near the hospital facilities.

On the college’s 31st anniversary (2000), the establishment was renamed to Evangelical College of Paraná. The following year, after the medicine course expansion and the creation of new graduation programs, the need for the construction of a new building increased. Thus, in 2004 a new building was erected at Rua Padre Anchieta, 2770, where the college remains located.

On September 27, 2018, the college and hospital were acquired by the Mackenzie Presbyterian Institute, that renamed both institutions to Mackenzie Evangelical College of Paraná and Mackenzie Evangelical University Hospital, respectively.

In 2021, the medicine course was accredited by the Accreditation System of Medical Schools (SAEME), developed by the Brazilian Federal Council of Medicine.

== Medical Students' Scientific Congress ==
The Medical Student’s Scientific Congress (Conclave Científico dos Acadêmicos de Medicina – CONCIAM) is an event created by the professors and students from the Mackenzie Evangelical College of Paraná in which lectures and scientific research are presented throughout 4 consecutive days. Its first edition was presented in 1987, occurring annually since then.
