= Victor Godoy =

Brazilian politician (born 1981)

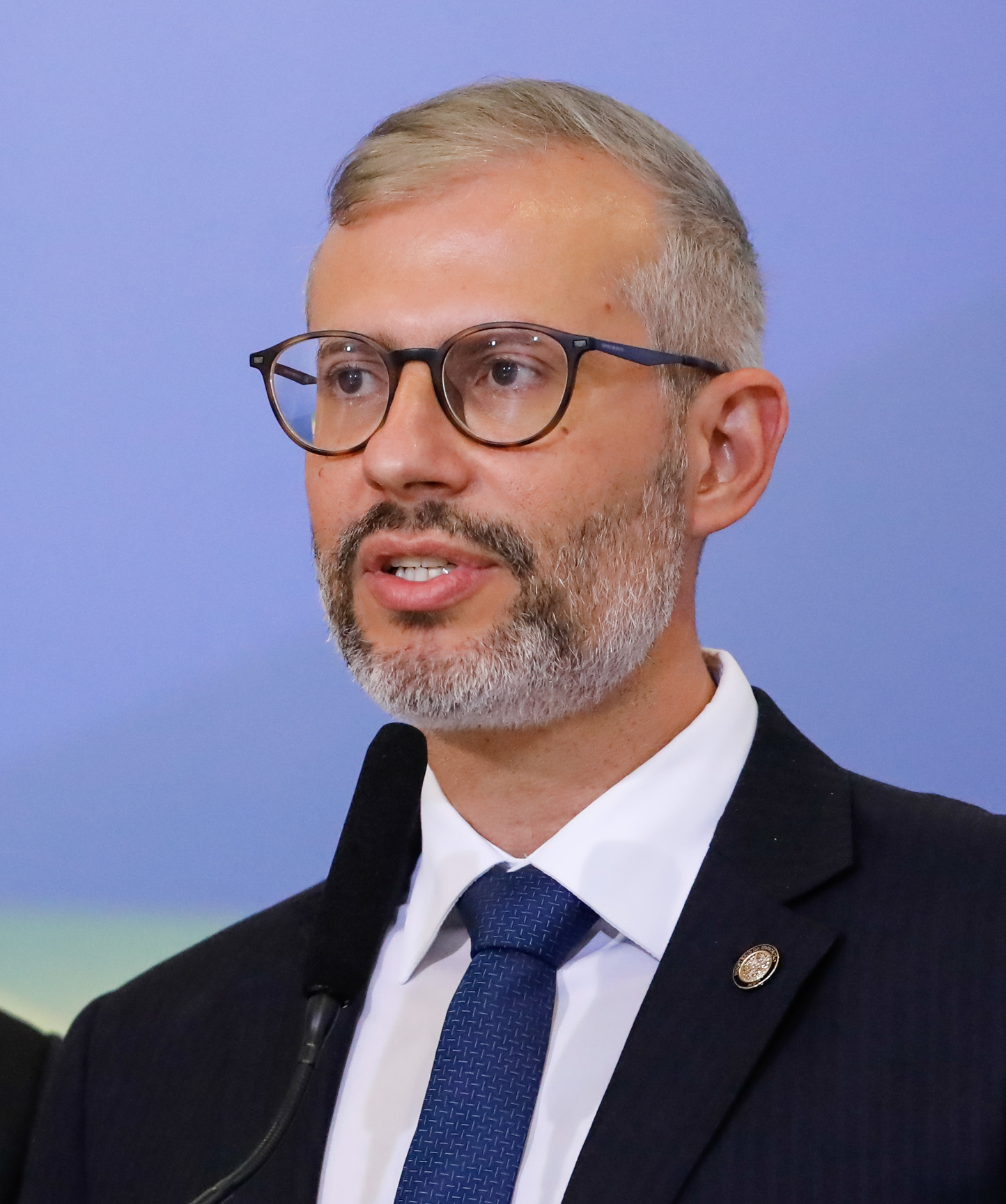
- Godoy in 2022

Minister of Education
- In office 29 March 2022 – 31 December 2022
- President: Jair Bolsonaro
- Preceded by: Milton Ribeiro
- Succeeded by: Camilo Santana

Personal details
- Born: 22 January 1981 (age 45)
- Party: Independent

Victor Godoy Veiga (born 22 January 1981) is a Brazilian politician. From March to December 2022, he served as minister of education. From 2020 to 2022, he served as executive secretary of the Ministry of Education. From 2004 to 2020, he was a federal auditor of finance and control at the Office of the Comptroller General.
