= Multilaser =

Consumer electronics company of Brazil

Multi
- Formerly: Multilaser (1987-2022)
- Company type: Sociedade Anonima
- Industry: Electronics
- Founded: 1987
- Founder: Israel Ostrowiecki
- Headquarters: São Paulo, São Paulo, Brazil
- Key people: Alexandre Ostrowiecki (president)
- Products: Home appliances, Tablets, Informatics, Headphones
- Net income: RS$ 1,5 billion
- Website: www.multilaser.com.br

Multi, known by the old name of Multilaser, is an electronics company based in Brazil.

Former name Multilaser are manufacturers and marketers of tablets, media players, GPS, pen drives, computer accessories, games, sporting goods, audio and video, with greater highlights for computer accessories and tablets. Its headquarters is located in São Paulo and its industrial complex is located in Extrema, Minas Gerais.

It employs more than 2,500 employees and 40 engineers divided into laboratories in Brazil and Asia.
