= Esther Ferraz =

Brazilian public servant

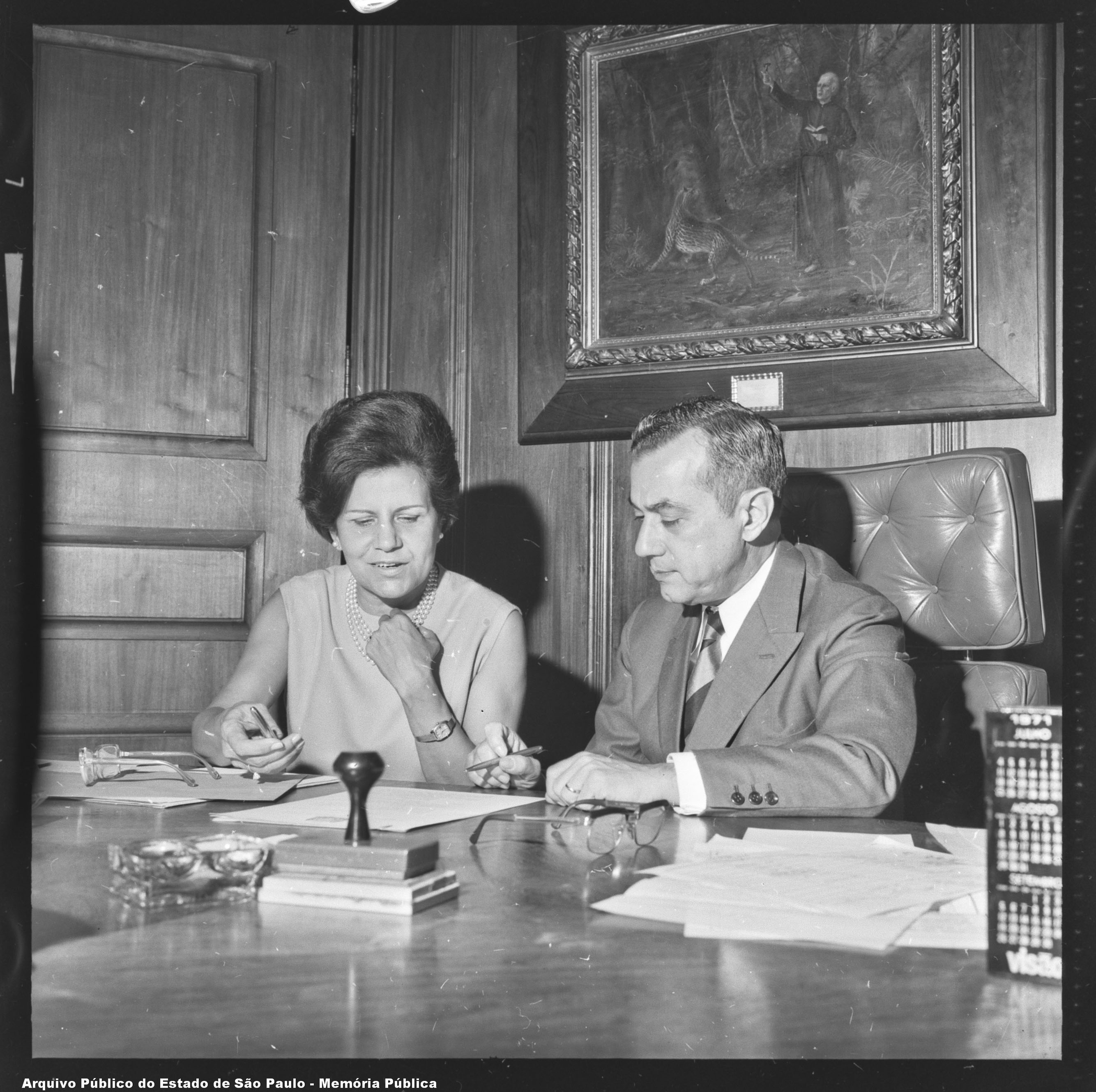
The secretary of education of the state of São Paulo Esther de Figueiredo Ferraz speaking with governor Laudo Natel.

Esther Figueiredo Ferraz (February 6, 1915 – September 23, 2008) was the first female Minister to serve in the government of Brazil. Ferraz served as the Brazilian Minister of Education from 1982 until 1985.

Esther Ferraz was born in São Paulo on February 6, 1915. She was a member of the Academia Paulista de Letras. Ferraz earned a law degree and became a lawyer. She went on to become the first woman to chair the Brazilian Bar Association (Ordem dos Advogados do Brasil), or OAB, beginning in 1949. Ferraz later became the first woman to teach and lecture at the University of São Paulo (USP).

She served on the São Paulo state Board of Education from 1963 to 1964. Ferraz held the post of Director of Higher Education of the Ministry of Education and Culture (Diretora do Ensino Superior do Ministério da Educação e Cultura) from 1966 until 1967 under the government of Castelo Branco. She later served on the Federal Council of Education (Conselho Federal de Educação) between 1969 and 1982.

Esther Ferraz became the first female Minister of Education and Culture from 1982 until 1985 under the government of President João Figueiredo. In doing so, she became the first woman to head a Brazilian government ministry.

She authored several books, including Mulheres Freqüentemente and Prostituição e Criminalidade Feminina, which dealt with women and prostitution.

Esther Ferraz died of a stroke at the Hospital do Coração in São Paulo on September 23, 2008, at the age of 92.

Preceded by Rubem Carlos Ludwig	Brazilian Minister of Education; 1982–1985	Succeeded by Marco Maciel
