= Instituto Benjamin Constant =

Brazilian institute for the education of the visually impaired

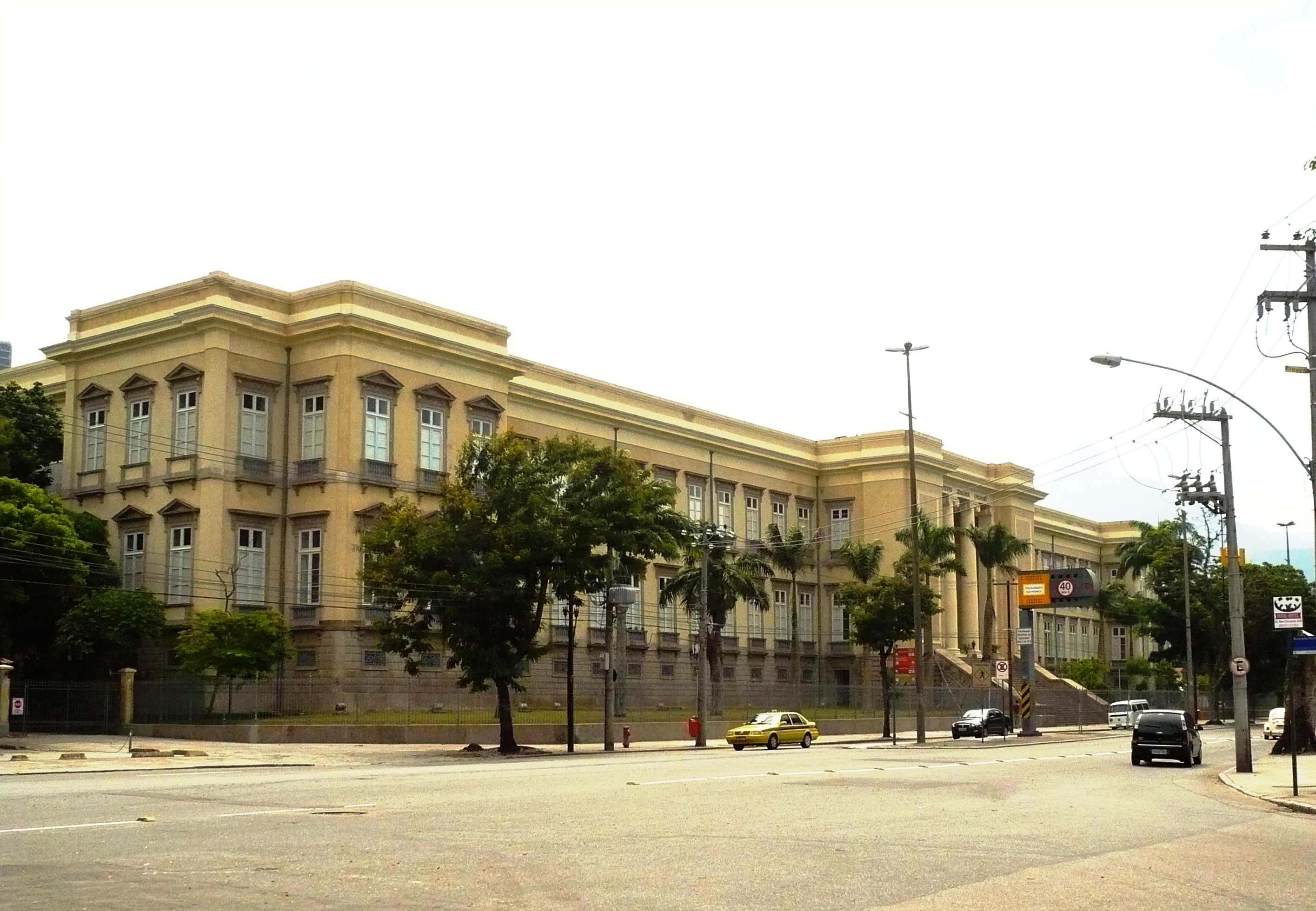
- Instituto Benjamin Constant, Rio de Janeiro
- Formation: 1891
- Headquarters: Urca, Rio de Janeiro, Brazil
- Location: Av. Pasteur, 350 / 368
- Coordinates: 22.953597°S 43.172208°W
- Parent organization: Ministry of Education
- Website: ibc.gov.br

Instituto Benjamin Constant (IBC) is a part of Brazil's Ministry of Education, and is charged with promoting educational opportunities for the visually impaired. It is located in the neighborhood of Urca in Rio de Janeiro.

IBC was created by imperial decree in 1854, and is named after the Brazilian soldier and intellectual Benjamin Constant. In addition to education and advocacy, it houses a braille press and offers courses in braille reading and publication.
