= Benjamin Constant do Sul =

Municipality in Rio Grande do Sul, Brazil

Coordinates: 27°30′36″S 52°35′52″W

- Municipality
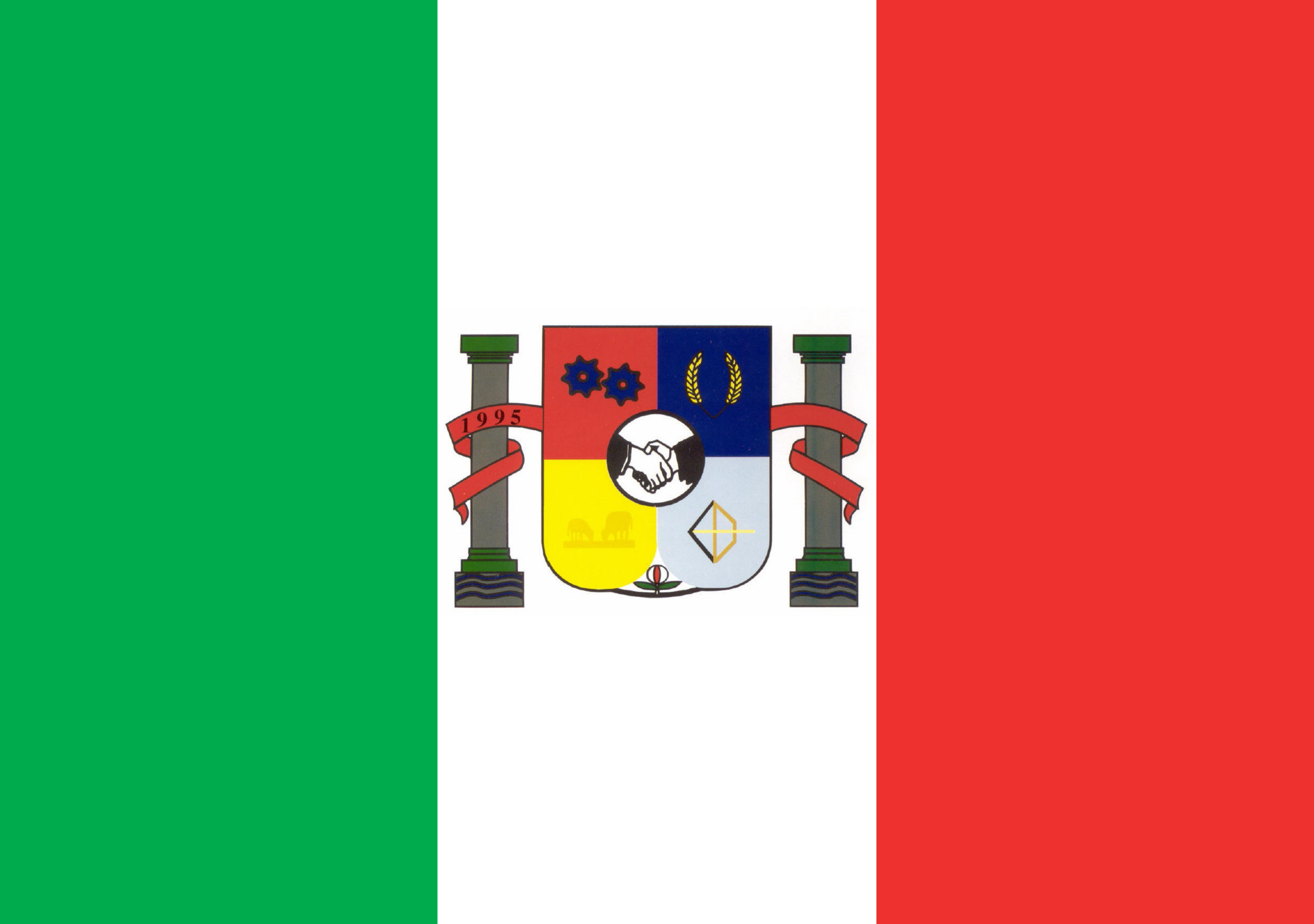
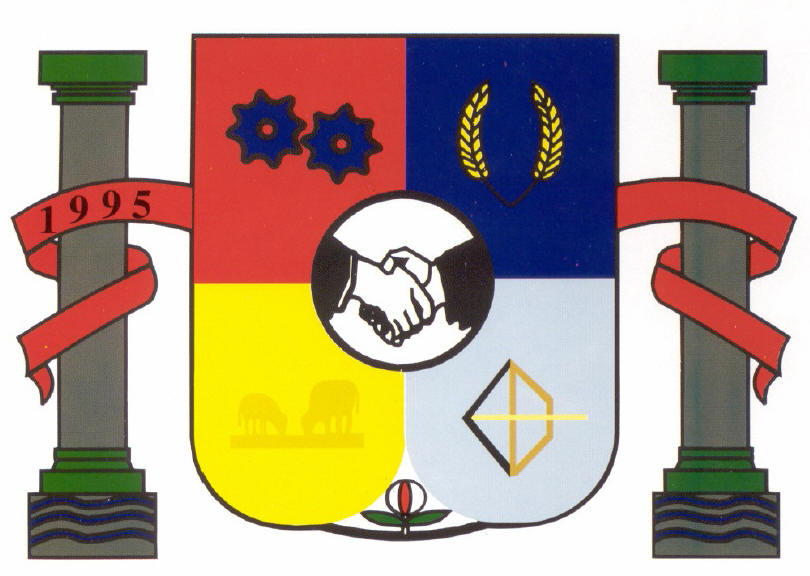
- Flag Coat of arms
- Interactive map of Benjamin Constant do Sul
- Country: Brazil
- Time zone: UTC−3 (BRT)

Benjamin Constant do Sul is a municipality in the state of Rio Grande do Sul, Brazil. As of 2020, the estimated population was 1,958.

== See also ==
- List of municipalities in Rio Grande do Sul
