= Otaviano Canuto =

Brazilian economist (born 1956)

Otaviano Canuto dos Santos Filho
- Born: 5 January 1956 (age 70); Aracaju, Sergipe, Brazil
- Spouse: Catherine Mathieu

Academic background
- Education: UFS Universidade Federal de Sergipe B.A in Economics, 1976; Concordia University M.A. in Economics; Universidade Estadual de Campinas PhD in Economics

Academic work
- Institutions: World Bank; International Monetary Fund; Inter-American Development Bank; Ministry of Finance, Brazil; Universidade Estadual de Campinas; University of Sao Paulo
- Scientific career
- Thesis: Processos de industrialização tardia : o "paradigma" da Coreia do Sul
- Website: Information at IDEAS / RePEc

Otaviano Canuto dos Santos Filho (born 5 January 1956) is a Brazilian economist. He is the executive director of the executive board of directors of the World Bank Group and its affiliates, the same position he held from 2004 to 2007.

He previously served as executive director of the board of the International Monetary Fund (IMF) for Brazil, Cabo Verde, Dominican Republic, Ecuador, Guyana, Haiti, Nicaragua, Panama, Suriname, Timor Leste and Trinidad and Tobago; vice-president and head of the Poverty Reduction and Economic Management (PREM); senior adviser on BRICS economies at the World Bank; and state secretary for international affairs at the Ministry of Finance of Brazil (2002–2003).

== Education ==
Canuto obtained a bachelor's degree in economics from the Federal University of Sergipe, Brazil, where he studied from 1973 to 1976. He earned a Master of Arts in economics at Concordia University, Montreal, P.Q, Canada in 1979 to 1981. He earned a PhD in economics at the University of Campinas (UNICAMP), Campinas-SP, Brazil, where he studied from 1986 to 1991.

== Career ==
Canuto began his career as professor, teaching macroeconomics, international economics and the Brazilian economy at the University of São Paulo and University of Campinas (UNICAMP) from 1982 to 2002, and at the Federal University of Uberlândia from 1982 to 1988.

In 2002 he joined the Brazilian Ministry of Finance as the state secretary for international affairs, a position he held through 2003. In his capacity as deputy minister of finance, Canuto managed multilateral affairs, relationships with other governments, and institutional relations with foreign investors. He also coordinated the technical contribution of the Ministry of Finance to the Brazilian government's foreign trade negotiations.

In 2004, Canuto was appointed executive director of the board of the World Bank, a position he held until 2007. He was responsible for the conduct of the World Bank's general operations, performing duties under powers delegated by the board of governors. During this period he also served as vice-chairman of the Audit Committee and chairman of the Budget Committee of the World Bank. Canuto joined the Inter-American Development Bank (IDB) in 2007 as vice-president for Countries, where he led the development of relationships between the IDB and borrowing countries, as well as campaigns to formulate the IDB's country and regional strategies.

Canuto returned to the World Bank in 2009 as vice-president. As head of the Poverty Reduction and Economic Management Network (PREM), he was responsible for a division of more than 700 economists and public sector specialists working on economic policy advice, technical assistance, and financial operations with the World Bank's client countries. In 2013, he transitioned to senior adviser on BRICS economies, a new position established by President Jim Yong Kim to bring a fresh research focus to emerging markets and, in particular, economies of BRICS countries.

in 2016, Canuto transitioned from executive director at the board of the IMF for Brazil, Cabo Verde, Dominican Republic, Ecuador, Guyana, Haiti, Nicaragua, Panama, Suriname, Timor Leste and Trinidad and Tobago to become the executive director at the executive board of directors of the World Bank Group and its affiliates.

== Awards and recognition ==
Country	Year	Award	Category	Key contributions	Awarded	Reward(s)	Result	Ref.
Brazil	1998	Ceferino Vaz Academic Recognition Award	Economics	Economic development	University of Campinas	Certification	Yes	
Brazil	1996	Medal of Economic Merit	Economist	Economics in Sergipe	Conselho Regional de Economia pt:Conselho Federal de Economia16a. Região - CORECON/SE.	Medal of Economic Merit	Yes	

== Publications ==
Canuto is the author, co-author or editor of numerous books, including Until Debt Do Us Part: Subnational Debt, Insolvency, and Markets with co-author Lili Liu, Dealing with the Challenges of Macro Financial Linkages in Emerging Markets, The Day After Tomorrow, and Ascent after Decline: Regrowing Global Economies after the Great Recession (co-edited with Danny M. Leipziger).

- Canuto, Otaviano (1994). Brasil E Coreia Do Sul: Os (Des)Caminhos Da Industrializacao Tardia. Brazil: (Nobel) Portuguese Edition. ISBN 978-8521308010.
- Alexandre, Michel; dos Santos Filho, Otaviano Canuto; Tadeu Lima, Gilberto (2006). "Determinantes das decisões locacionais da atividade financeira". Nova Economia (UFMG). 16 (2): 243–263. doi:10.1590/S0103-63512006000200002.

He is also a frequently contributor to economic-oriented blogs and periodicals including The Huffington Post, VoxEU, Roubini Global Economics, Seeking Alpha, Project Syndicate, and No Se Mancha.
