= Abraham Weintraub =

Brazilian economist and investment banker (born 1971)

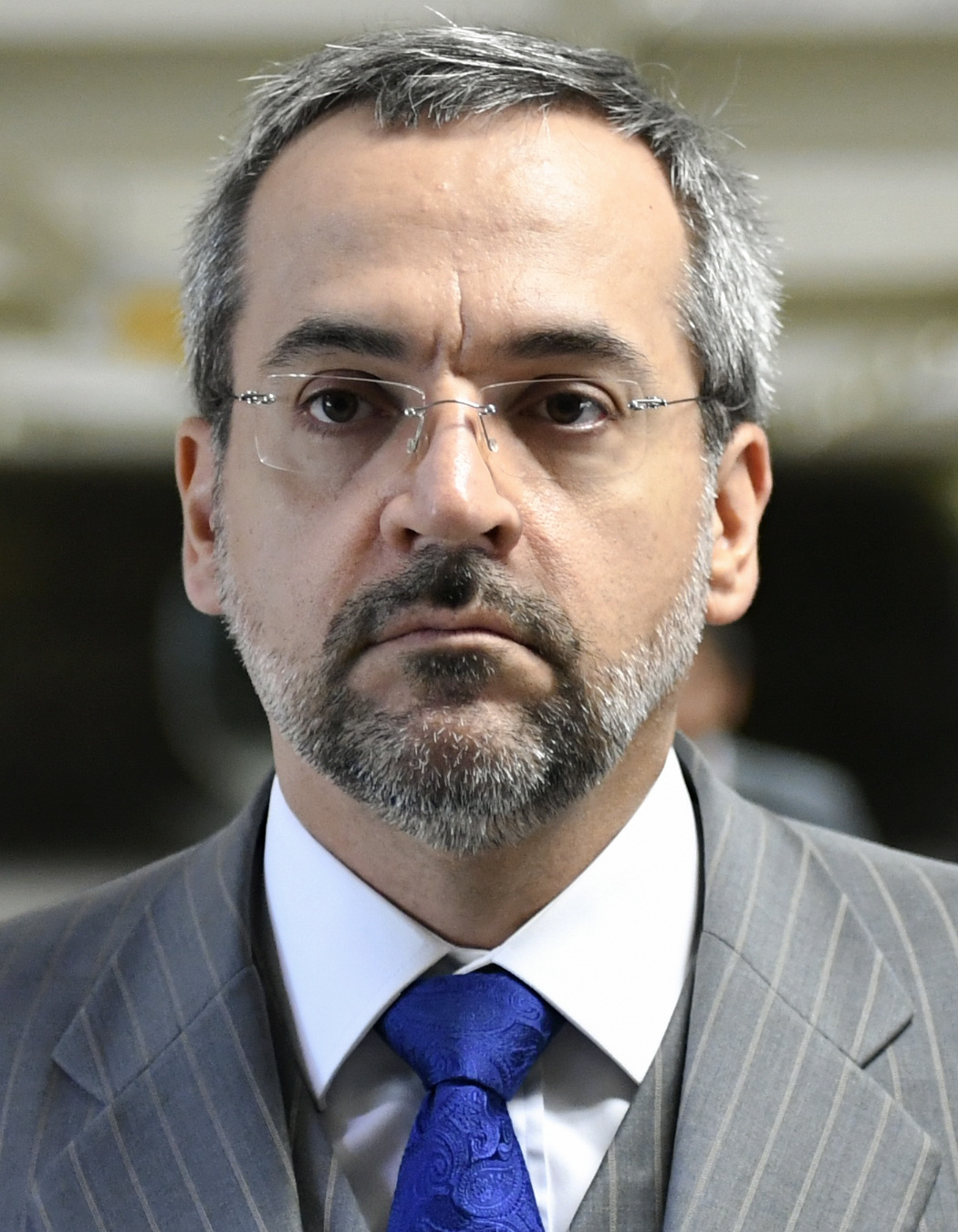
- Weintraub in 2019

World Bank Group Executive Director from the 15th district
- In office 3 August 2020 – 30 April 2022
- Preceded by: Otaviano Canuto

Minister of Education
- In office 8 April 2019 – 20 June 2020
- President: Jair Bolsonaro
- Preceded by: Ricardo Vélez Rodríguez
- Succeeded by: Milton Ribeiro

Personal details
- Born: Abraham Bragança de Vasconcellos Weintraub; 11 October 1971 (age 55) São Paulo, Brazil
- Party: PMB (2022–present) (Note: Brasil 35 (2022–present): Party renaming pending approval by the Superior Electoral Court.)
- Education: University of São Paulo (BS); Getúlio Vargas Foundation (MiF)

Abraham Bragança de Vasconcellos Weintraub (born 11 October 1971) is a Brazilian economist and investment banker who served as Brazil's Minister of Education under Jair Bolsonaro from 2019 to 2020. He served as the executive director for the World Bank from the 15th district from 2020 to 2022, when he resigned his post in order to run in the 2022 São Paulo gubernatorial election.

== Biography ==
Weintraub was born in São Paulo to a secular Jewish father, Mauro Salomão Weintraub, and a Catholic mother, Marilisa Bragança de Vasconcellos, both doctors who studied at Faculty of Medicine of Sorocaba. He is a professor at the Federal University of São Paulo (Unifesp), Master in Administration in Finance for Getúlio Vargas Foundation (FGV), and graduated in Economic Sciences at the University of São Paulo (USP) in 1994.

An executive of the financial market with over 20 years of experience, he acted as the lead economist and director of Banco Votorantim and as a partner in Quest Investimentos. He was a member of the transition team of the government of President Bolsonaro, and was Secretary-Executive of the Chief of Staff Onyx Lorenzoni.

He became a member of Bolsonaro's transition cabinet in November 2018.

=== Ministry of Education ===
==== Entry ====
On 8 April 2019, Bolsonaro appointed Weintraub as the new Minister of Education, replacing Ricardo Vélez Rodríguez. Weintraub is close to Onyx Lorenzoni, the current Chief of Staff whom he previously served as Executive-Secretary.

==== Departure ====
On 18 June 2020, after 14 months in office, Weintraub announced his resignation from the Ministry in a video with Bolsonaro posted on social media. He had been criticized for issuing statements deemed controversial, as well as for mismanagement.

On the night of 19 June, before his exoneration was published, Weintraub traveled to the United States. To travel, Weintraub took advantage of the diplomatic passport conceded to ministers, due to the fact that U.S. travel restrictions related to COVID-19 barred civilians from Brazil starting on 29 May. This was cause for controversy, as a request to the Supreme Federal Court for the apprehension of Weintraub's passport had been filed the day before he traveled, motivated by the two open investigations against him.

On 20 June 2020, his resignation from the position of Minister of Education was published on the government's official journal. On 23 June 2020, the resignation date was rectified to be the previous day, 19 June 2020. The government also published a note stating that Weintraub's resignation request was only formally received after he had already left the country, on 20 June, and that Weintraub himself requested his resignation be retroactively changed to 19 June.

=== World Bank ===
In July 2020, Weintraub was elected as an executive director of the World Bank for a term ending on 31 October 2020. Officials from the Bank have criticized Weintraub for propagating false information regarding the COVID-19 pandemic. He resigned on 30 April 2022 in order to run in the 2022 São Paulo gubernatorial election.

== Controversies ==
=== Racist remarks ===
After a meeting with President Bolsonaro in March 2020, Weintraub was accused of being racist and anti-minority, when he said he did not like the term "indigenous peoples". However, he claimed that this was as he "does not like to separate ethnic groups, and that for him there is only 'the Brazilian people' and not different groups in Brazil".

On 4 April 2020, Weintraub also tweeted an anti-Chinese slur, insinuating that China was responsible for the COVID-19 pandemic and that it was part of its "plan for world domination". In the original Portuguese, his tweet substituted the letter "r" with capital "L" – "BLazil" instead of "Brazil" in a style commonly used to mock a Chinese accent. He later claimed that it was not a racial statement but an ideological statement due to his anti-communism.

=== Accusations regarding drugs in universities ===
In November 2019, during an interview with Jornal da Cidade, Weintraub accused federal universities of cultivating cannabis and preparing methamphetamine in chemistry labs, but did not present any evidence to support his claims:

You get cannabis plantations, but it's not just three cannabis trees, it's extensive plantations of some universities, to the point of having pesticide sprayers. Because being organic is good against soy so Brazil's agribusiness doesn't grow, but on their weed they want all the technology available.

Take chemistry labs – a chemistry faculty didn't used to be an indoctrination center – developing synthetic drugs, methamphetamine, and the police can't go in the campus.

After the fact, 10 state deputies of Bahia presented an interpellation, questioning Weintraub's accusations. The then-minister responded by saying that his declarations were generic and that he had no intention of accusing any specific persons. Weintraub's statements would therefore be considered as an exercise of free speech.

=== Emmanuel Macron ===
In August 2019, Weintraub wrote that the French people had elected a president "devoid of any character" and that Macron is "nothing but a worthless opportunist who seeks support from the French agricultural lobby".

=== Filming in class ===
In April 2019, Weintraub stated that the filming of teachers by students during class is a right held by the latter, calling it an "individual liberty". Responding to the minister's statements, jurists argued that the unauthorized filming of teachers in class may violate the fundamental rights of educators, and is unconstitutional.

=== Crack conspiracy theory ===
In a 2018 interview Weintraub claimed that crack was introduced to Brazil by communists in order to weaken the country. He also said that FARC, a Colombia guerilla movement, had been invited as honored guests to the Foro de São Paulo, an annual gathering of Latin American leftist parties. These comments led The Guardian to brand Weintraub as a conspiracy theorist.

=== Spelling errors ===
On multiple occasions, the then-Minister of Education wrote incorrect or otherwise improper Portuguese, with spelling mistakes or grammatical errors, on official documents and social media. In January 2020, in a tweet to Eduardo Bolsonaro, Weintraub wrote "imprecionante" instead of "impressionante", roughly equivalent to writing "imprecive" instead of "impressive", in English; the tweet was later deleted by Weintraub.

=== Wikipedia ===
In 2019, Brazil's Ministry of Education (MEC) asked the Portuguese Wikipedia to delete the page for Weintraub and threatened legal action.

== Notes ==
Political offices
| Preceded by Ricardo Vélez Rodríguez | Minister of Education; 2019–20 | Succeeded by Milton Ribeiro |
Diplomatic posts
| Preceded by Otaviano Canuto | World Bank Group Executive Director from the 15th district 2020–2022 | Succeeded by TBA |
