= Luís da Gama e Silva =

Brazilian diplomat

- Born: March 15, 1913; Mogi Mirim, Brazil
- Died: February 2, 1979 (aged 65); São Paulo, Brazil
- Occupation: Civil server
- Employer: University of São Paulo

Luís Antônio da Gama e Silva (March 15, 1913 – February 2, 1979) was a Brazilian jurist, professor, and diplomat. He served as the Minister of Justice twice under Brazil's military dictatorship, during which he drafted the Institutional Act Number Five, an executive decree that consolidated the regime by warranting it extraordinary powers and prerrogatives.

He was a professor at the Faculty of Law of São Paulo and presided over the University of São Paulo as its rector from 1963 to 1967.
