= 2024 in South America =

The following lists events that happened during 2024 in South America.

The combined population of South America is estimated at 439.71 million (2023).

== Incumbents ==
=== Argentina ===
(Argentina)

=== Bolivia ===
(Bolivia)

=== Brazil ===
(Brazil)

=== Chile ===
(Chile)

=== Colombia ===
(Colombia)

=== Ecuador ===
(Ecuador)

=== Guyana ===
(Guyana)

=== Paraguay ===
(Paraguay)

=== Peru ===
(Peru)

=== Suriname ===
(Suriname)

=== Uruguay ===
(Uruguay)

=== Venezuela ===
(Venezuela)

== Events ==
=== Elections ===
- 28 July – 2024 Venezuelan presidential election
- 6 October – 2024 São Paulo mayoral election
- 27 October – 2024 Uruguayan general election

== See also ==
- 2020s
- 2020s in political history
- List of state leaders in South America in 2024
- Mercosur
- Organization of American States
- Organization of Ibero-American States
- Caribbean Community
- Union of South American Nations
