= 2024 São Paulo municipal election =

- 6 October 2024 (first round); 27 October 2024 (second round)
- Turnout: 72.66% (first round); 68.46% (second round)
- Mayoral election
- Opinion polls
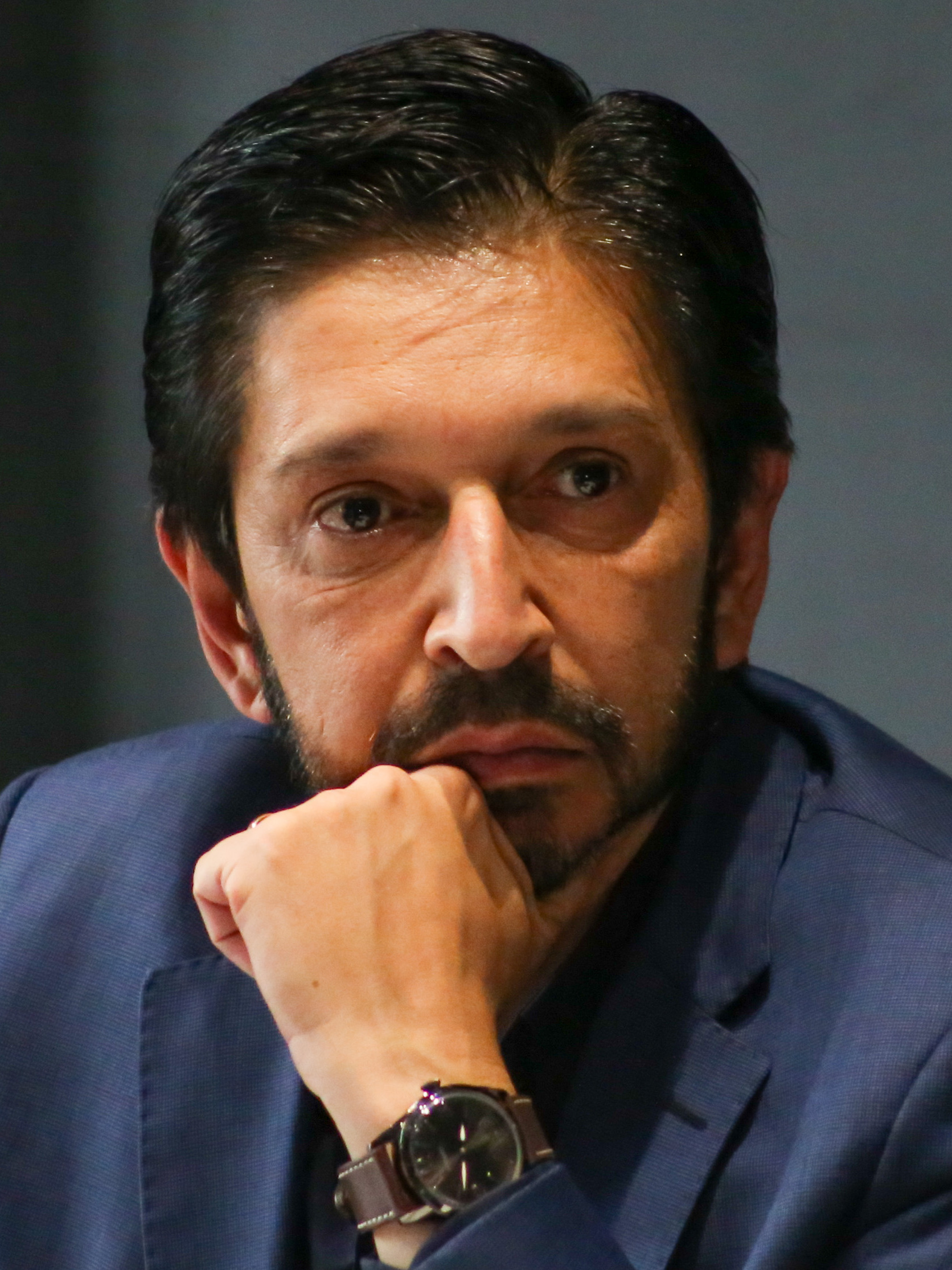

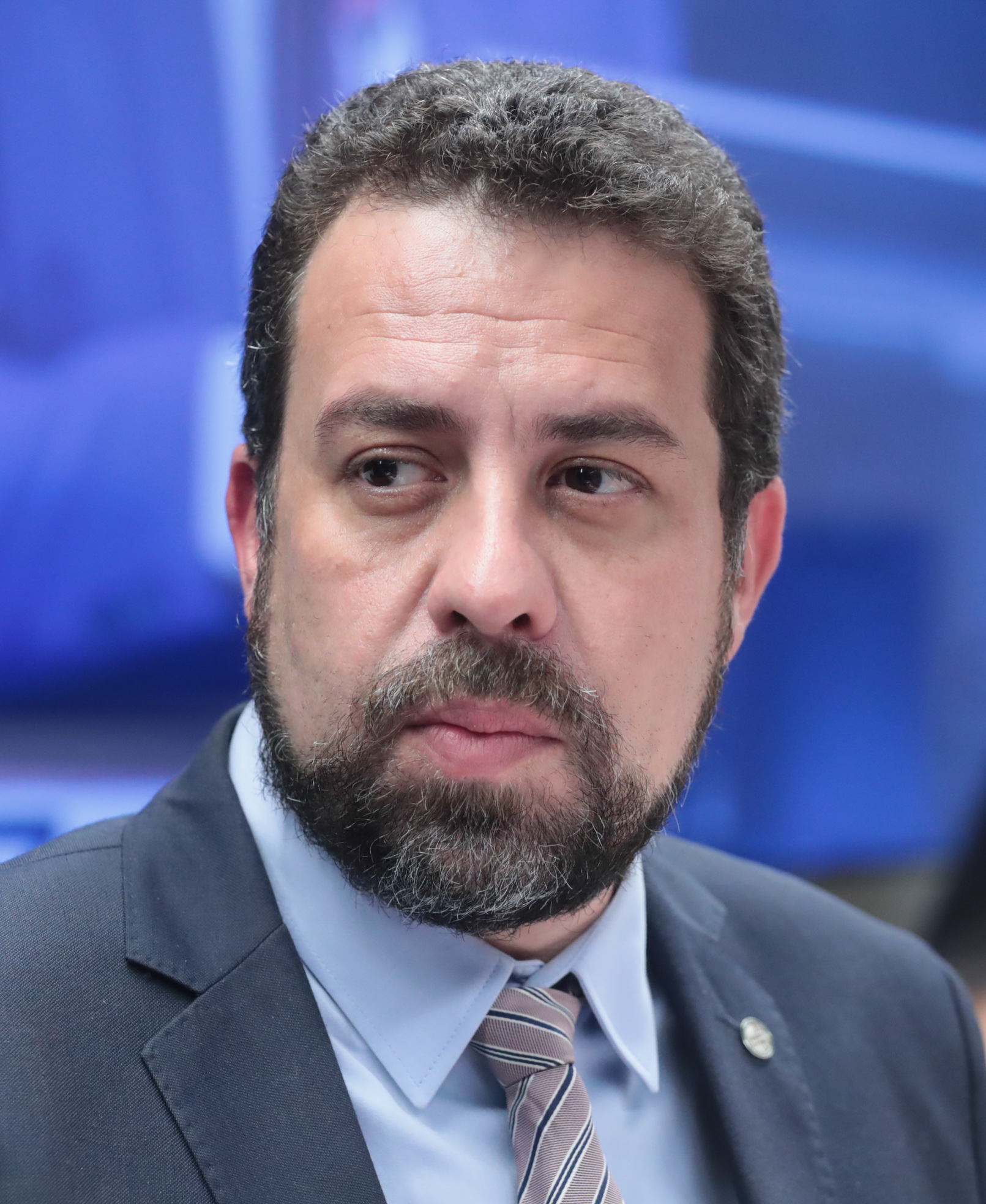
Candidate	Ricardo Nunes	Guilherme Boulos
Party	MDB	PSOL
Alliance	Safe Path to São Paulo	Love for São Paulo
Running mate	Mello Araújo	Marta Suplicy
Popular vote	3,393,110	2,323,901
Percentage	59.35%	40.65%
Mayor before election
Ricardo Nunes
MDB
Elected mayor
Ricardo Nunes
MDB
- Parliamentary election
Party	Leader	Vote %	Seats	+/–
Municipal Chamber
FE Brasil	Alessandro Guedes	14.74	9	0
UNIÃO	Milton Leite	12.04	7	0
MDB	Sidney Cruz	11.72	7	+4
PL	Isac Félix	11.44	7	+5
PSOL-REDE	Elaine Mineiro	11.24	7	+1
PODE	Milton Ferreira	9.39	6	+3
PP	Marcos Palumbo	6.13	4	+3
PSD	Rodrigo Goulart	5.20	3	0
PSB	Eliseu Gabriel	4.21	2	0
Republicanos	Sansão Pereira	3.51	2	−2
NOVO	Cris Monteiro	2.47	1	−1
PSDB-Cidadania	Xexéu Tripoli	0.90	0	−10
This lists parties that won seats. See the complete results below.

The 2024 São Paulo municipal election took place on 6 October 2024, with a runoff held on 27 October. Voters elected a mayor, vice mayor, and 55 city council members. The incumbent mayor, Ricardo Nunes of the Brazilian Democratic Movement (MDB), ran for reelection.

== Candidates ==
=== Candidates in runoff ===
Party	Mayoral candidate		Vice mayoral candidate (Note: Same party as the mayoral candidate, unless mentioned in parentheses)		Coalition
Brazilian Democratic Movement (MDB 15)		Ricardo Nunes; Mayor of São Paulo (since 2021); Vice Mayor of São Paulo (2021); Councillor (2013–2021)	Ricardo de Mello Araújo	Ricardo de Mello Araújo (PL); Retired military police officer	Safe Path to São Paulo: Brazilian Democratic Movement (MDB); Liberal Party (PL); Republicanos; Progressistas (PP); Brazil Union (UNIÃO); Social Democratic Party (PSD); Solidariedade; Agir; Avante; Democratic Renewal Party (PRD); National Mobilization (MOBILIZA); Podemos (PODE)
Socialism and Liberty Party (PSOL 50)	Guilherme Boulos	Guilherme Boulos; Federal Deputy (since 2023)	Marta Suplicy	Marta Suplicy (PT); Senator (2011–2019); Mayor of São Paulo (2001–2005)	Love for São Paulo: Fed. PSOL REDE (PSOL, REDE); FE Brasil (PT, PCdoB, PV); Democratic Labour Party (PDT); Brazilian Woman's Party (PMB); Brazilian Communist Party (PCB)

=== Candidates failing to make runoff ===
Party	Mayoral candidate		Vice mayoral candidate		Coalition
United Socialist Workers' Party (PSTU 16)		Altino Prazeres; Metro train operator, former president of the São Paulo Metro Workers Union		Silvana Garcia; Leader of housing rights movement	—N/a
Brazilian Labour Renewal Party (PRTB 28)		Pablo Marçal; Businessman and coaching digital influencer		Antônia de Jesus; Military police officer	—N/a
Workers' Cause Party (PCO 29)		João Caproni Pimenta; Columnist for the party news site		Francisco Muniz; Musician	—N/a
New Party (NOVO 30)		Marina Helena; Economist, former director of the Special Secretariat of Privatizations of the Ministry of Economics	Reynaldo Priell Neto	Reynaldo Priell Neto; Military police officer	—N/a
Brazilian Socialist Party (PSB 40)	Tabata Amaral	Tabata Amaral; Federal Deputy (since 2019)		Lúcia França First Lady of State of São Paulo (2018); Second Lady of State of São Paulo (2015–2018)	—N/a
Brazilian Social Democracy Party (PSDB 45)	José Luiz Datena	Datena; TV news presenter	José Aníbal	José Aníbal; Senator (2016–2017; 2021–2022)	Always Forward Federation: Brazilian Social Democracy Party (PSDB); Cidadania
Popular Unity (UP 80)		Ricardo Senese; Metro transport operator, director at the National Federation of Metro Workers		Julia Soares National Coordinator of the Women's Movement Olga Benário	—N/a

=== Withdrawn candidates ===
- Ricardo Salles (PL) - Former Minister of the Environment and Federal Deputy from São Paulo since 2023.
- Padre Kelmon (DC) - Candidate for president in the 2022 Brazilian general election. He had announced his potential candidacy as a member of the Democratic Renewal Party (PRD), but the party decided to support Nunes' bid for reelection. After this, he joined the Brazilian Labour Renewal Party (PRTB) and announced his candidacy as a member of this party; however, his candidacy was replaced by the candidacy of the businessman Pablo Marçal. Eventually he gave up his political intentions and started supporting the potential candidacy of the businessman Dr. Fernando Fantauzzi (DC).
- Abraham Weintraub (PMB) - Former Minister of Education; World Bank Group Executive Director from the 15th district (2020–2022); candidate for federal deputy from São Paulo in 2022.
- Kim Kataguiri (UNIÃO) - Anti-corruption activist, MBL leader, and federal deputy from São Paulo since 2019.
- Fernando Fantauzzi (DC) - Businessman and potential candidate for mayor in the 2024 São Paulo mayoral election.
- Bebeto Haddad (DC) - Former municipal secretary of Sports, Leisure and Recreation of São Paulo (2006–2012).
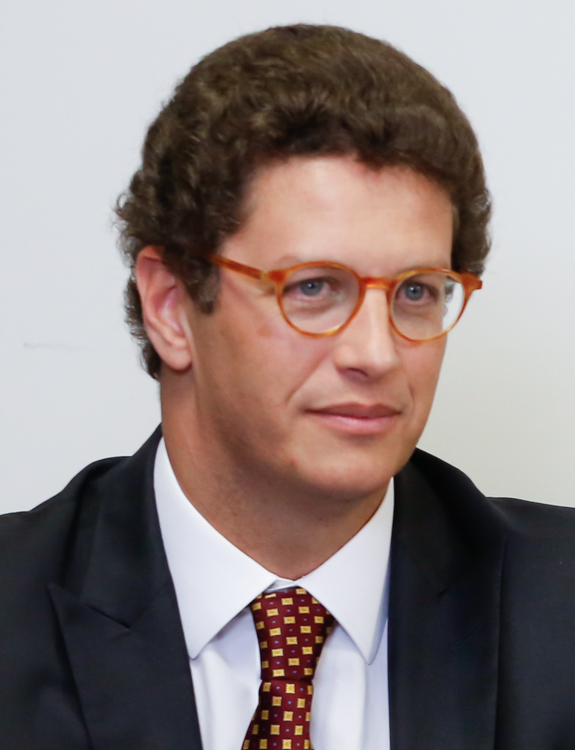
Federal Deputy
Ricardo Salles (PL)
from São Paulo

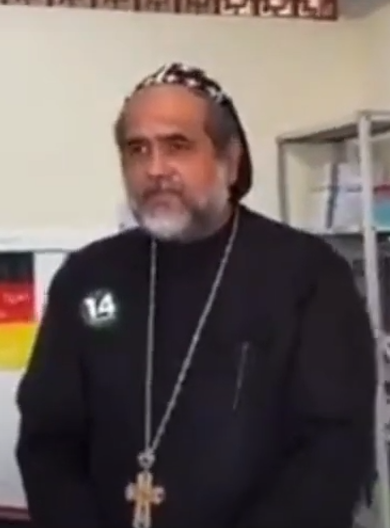
Politician
Padre Kelmon (DC)
from Acajutiba

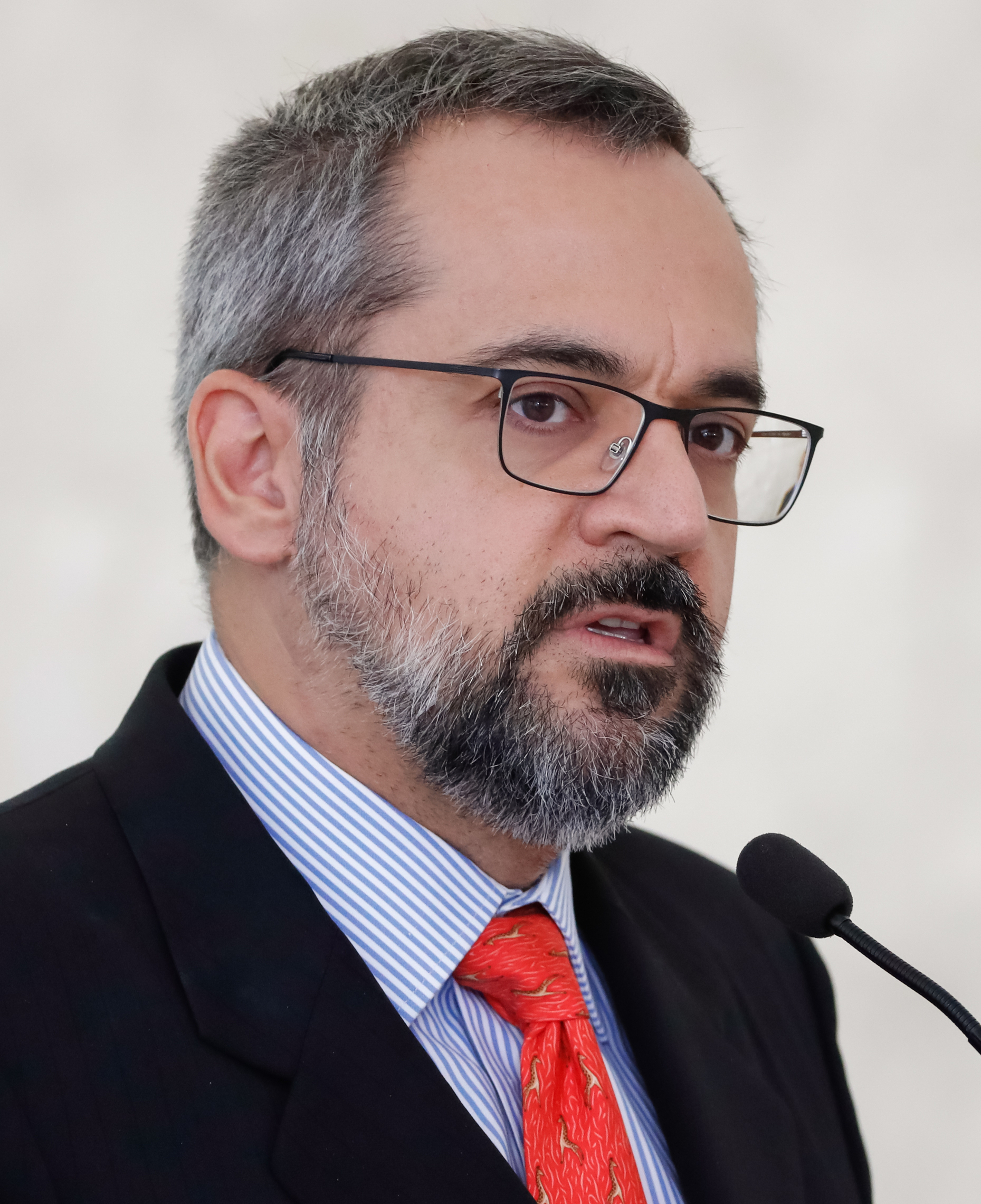
Minister of Education of Brazil
Abraham Weintraub (PMB)
from São Paulo

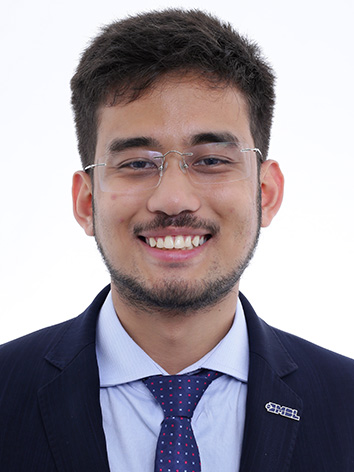
Federal Deputy
Kim Kataguiri (UNIÃO)
from Salto

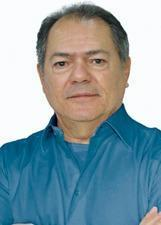
Former Federal Deputy and Municipal Secretary
Bebeto Haddad (DC)
from São Luís

== Outgoing Municipal Chamber ==
The result of the last municipal election and the current situation in the Municipal Chamber is given below:

Affiliation	Members		+/–
Affiliation	Elected	Current	+/–
MDB	3	11	▲8
PT	8	9	▲1
UNIÃO	didn't exist	7	▲7
PL	2	6	▲4
PSD	3	6	▲3
PSOL	6	5	▼1
Republicanos	4	3	▼1
PP	1	2	▲1
PSB	2	2	Steady
PODE	3	2	▼1
PV	1	1	Steady
NOVO	2	1	▼1
PSL	1	extinct party (Note: Democrats (DEM) and the Social Liberal Party (PSL) merged into the Brazil Union in February 2022.)	▼1
PTB	1	extinct party (Note: Brazilian Labour Party (PTB) and Patriota merged in the Democratic Renewal Party (PRD) in November 2023.)	▼1
PSC	1	extinct party (Note: Social Christian Party (PSC) merged into Podemos (PODE) in June 2023.)	▼1
Patriota	3	extinct party	▼3
DEM	6	extinct party	▼6
PSDB	8	0	▼8
Total	55		

== Debates ==
Below is a list of the mayoral debates scheduled or held for the 2024 election (times in UTC−03:00).

2024 São Paulo mayoral election debates
No.	Date, time, and location	Hosts	Moderators	Participants (Note: Debates broadcast on television or radio were legally required to invite all candidates whose parties or coalitions had at least five members in the National Congress based on the most recent election. The candidates listed in this table satisfied this condition.)					
Key: P Present A Absent I Invited N Not invited Out Out of the election E Expelled				MDB	PSOL	PSDB	PSB	PRTB	NOVO
Key: P Present A Absent I Invited N Not invited Out Out of the election E Expelled				Nunes	Boulos	Datena	Amaral	Marçal	Helena
1.1	8 August 2024, 22:15; Morumbi, São Paulo	Bandeirantes	Eduardo Oinegue	P	P	P	P	P	N
1.2	14 August 2024, 10:00; FAAP, São Paulo	Estadão, Terra	Roseann Kennedy	P	P	P	P	P	P
1.3	19 August 2024, 11:00; ESPM, São Paulo	Veja	Marcela Rahal	A	A	A	P	P	P
1.4	1 September 2024, 18:00; Bela Vista, São Paulo	TV Gazeta, MyNews	Denise Campos de Toledo	P	P	P	P	P	N
1.5	5 September 2024, 22:00; Jardim Paulista, São Paulo	Jovem Pan	Cancelled						
1.6	15 September 2024, 21:00; Teatro B32, São Paulo	TV Cultura	Leão Serva	P	P	E	P	P	P
1.7	17 September 2024, 09:30; Osasco	RedeTV!, UOL	Amanda Klein	P	P	P	P	P	P
1.8	20 September 2024, 11:15; Osasco	SBT	César Filho	P	P	P	P	P	P
1.9	23 September 2024, 19:00; São Paulo	Flow Podcast	Carlos Tramontina	P	P	P	P	P	P
1.10	28 September 2024, Osasco	Record São Paulo	Eduardo Ribeiro	P	P	P	P	P	P
1.11	30 September 2024, 10:00	Folha de S. Paulo, UOL	Fabiola Cidral	P	P	N	P	P	N
1.12	3 October 2024; Itaim Bibi, São Paulo	Rede Globo	César Tralli	P	P	P	P	P	N
2.1	14 October 2024, 22:15; Morumbi, São Paulo	Bandeirantes	Eduardo Oinegue	P	P	Out			
2.2	17 October 2024, 09:30; Osasco	UOL, RedeTV!	Amanda Klein	A	P	Out			
2.3	19 October 2024, 21:00; Barra Funda, São Paulo	RecordTV	Eduardo Ribeiro	I	I	Out			
2.4	21 October 2024, 10:00	UOL, Folha de S. Paulo	Fabiola Cidral	I	I	Out			
2.5	25 October 2024, 22:00; Itaim Bibi, São Paulo	Rede Globo	Cesar Tralli	I	I	Out			

=== Incidents ===
On 15 September 2024, Pablo Marçal was hospitalised after being assaulted by fellow mayoral candidate Datena with a metal chair during a televised debate on TV Cultura. This followed Marçal and Datena arguing over allegations of sexual misconduct involving the latter. Datena later said that he "had lost his head" after hearing Marçal refer to the allegations against him. On 17 September, Marçal and Ricardo Nunes had a heavy argument live during the debate on RedeTV!, leading the mediator Amanda Klein to warn the two candidates and interrupt the event for a few minutes. The action was praised by other journalists. On 23 September, during the Flow Podcast debate, Marçal was expelled for breaking the rules of the event by insulting Nunes and arguing with the mediator Carlos Tramontina in the closing remarks. Soon after the incident, Nunes' campaign marketing expert, Duda Lima, was punched in the face by one of Marçal's advisors after asking permission to pass while the latter was filming the candidate's expulsion.

== Opinion polls ==
=== First round ===
==== 2024 ====
Pollster/client(s)	Date(s) conducted	Sample size	Nunes MDB	Boulos PSOL	Datena PSDB	Marçal PRTB	Amaral PSB	M. Helena NOVO	Pimenta PCO	Others	Abst. Undec.	Lead
Results	6 October	Valid Votes	29.49	29.08	1.84	28.15	9.91	1.38	0.02	0.14	–	0.41
Results	6 October	Total Votes	26.59	26.22	1.66	25.38	8.94	1.24	0.01	0.13	9.82	0.37
Quaest	4–5 October	2,400	24%	25%	3%	23%	9%	2%	0%	0%	14%	1%
Datafolha	4–5 October	2,052	24%	27%	4%	24%	10%	2%	0%	0%	8%	3%
AtlasIntel	29 Sep–4 Oct	2,500	18.8%	29.9%	2.6%	27.8%	9.7%	2%	0%	0.7%	7.7%	2.1%
Real Time Big Data	2–3 October	1,000	24%	26%	3%	27%	12%	3%	0%	–	5%	1%
Datafolha	1–3 October	1,806	24%	26%	4%	24%	11%	2%	0%	–	9%	2%
Instituto Veritá	28 Sep–2 Oct	3,020	20.4%	26.2%	3.2%	34.1%	7.8%	3%	0.1%	0.8% (Note: Ricardo Senese (UP) with 0.4%; Altino Prazeres (PSTU) with 0.3% and Bebeto Haddad (DC) with 0.1%)	4.4%	7.9%
Real Time Big Data	30 Sep–1 Oct	1,500	25%	26%	3%	25%	11%	3%	0%	–	7%	1%
Futura/100% Cidades	30 Sep–1 Oct	1,000	26.9%	20.1%	3.8%	26.8%	9.4%	2%	0.4%	1.5% (Note: Bebeto Haddad (DC) with 1.5%; Ricardo Senese (UP) did not score.)	9.8%	0.1%
Vox Brasil	29 Sep–1 Oct	1,500	27.2%	24.3%	5.2%	21.6%	6.9%	2.2%	0.4%	0.5% (Note: Bebeto Haddad (DC) and Ricardo Senese (UP) with 0.2% each; Altino Prazeres (PSTU) with 0.1%)	11.7%	2.9%
Ideia	27 Sep–1 Oct	1,200	26%	25%	4%	22%	8%	5%	0.1%	0.4% (Note: Bebeto Haddad (DC) with 0.2%; Altino Prazeres (PSTU) and Ricardo Senese (UP) with 0.1% each.)	10%	1%
Paraná Pesquisas	27–30 September	1,500	27%	25%	6%	22.5%	8.9%	1.7%	0.1%	0.6% (Note: Altino Prazeres (PSTU), Bebeto Haddad (DC) and Ricardo Senese (UP) with 0.2% each.)	8.1%	2%
Quaest	27–29 September	1,800	24%	23%	6%	21%	11%	2%	0%	–	14%	1%
AtlasIntel	24–29 September	2,190	22.9%	29.4%	3.2%	25.4%	11.9%	4.2%	0.1%	0.4% (Note: Altino Prazeres (PSTU) with 0.3% and Ricardo Senese (UP) with 0.1%)	2.5%	4%
Real Time Big Data	27–28 September	1,500	26%	25%	5%	23%	10%	2%	1%	3% (Note: Bebeto Haddad (DC), Altino Prazeres (PSTU) and Ricardo Senese (UP) with 1% each.)	8%	1%
Datafolha	24–26 September	1,610	27%	25%	6%	21%	9%	2%	0%	–	9%	2%
Paraná Pesquisas	23–26 September	1,500	28%	24.9%	7.1%	20.5%	7.3%	2.1%	0.3%	0.9% (Note: Bebeto Haddad (DC) with 0.4%; Ricardo Senese (UP) with 0.3% and Altino Prazeres (PSTU) with 0.2%)	8.8%	3.1%
Instituto Veritá	22–26 September	3,020	20.1%	23.3%	5.3%	31.8%	6.6%	3.1%	0.1%	1.7% (Note: Bebeto Haddad (DC) with 1.2%; Altino Prazeres (PSTU) with 0.3% and Ricardo Senese (UP) with 0.2%)	7.9%	8.5%
Quaest	21–23 September	1,200	25%	23%	6%	20%	8%	2%	0%	–	16%	2%
AtlasIntel	17–22 September	2,218	20.9%	28.3%	6.9%	20.9%	10.8%	3.8%	0.1%	0.2% (Note: Altino Prazeres (PSTU) and Ricardo Senese (UP) with 0.1% each.)	8%	7.4%
Real Time Big Data	20–21 September	1,500	27%	24%	5%	21%	9%	2%	1%	3% (Note: Altino Prazeres (PSTU), Bebeto Haddad (DC) and Ricardo Senese (UP) with 1% each.)	11%	3%
Paraná Pesquisas	16–19 September	1,500	26.8%	23.7%	7%	21%	8.3%	1.9%	–	0.2% (Note: Bebeto Haddad (DC) and Altino Prazeres (PSTU) with 0.1% each.)	11.1%	3.1%
Futura/100% Cidades	16–18 September	1,000	28%	25.5%	5.7%	19.7%	5.5%	1.5%	0.1%	0.4% (Note: Ricardo Senese (UP) with 0.3% and Bebeto Haddad (DC) with 0.1% each.)	13.6%	2.5%
Datafolha	17–19 September	1,204	27%	26%	6%	19%	8%	3%	0%	1% (Note: Bebeto Haddad (DC))	9%	1%
Quaest	15–17 September	1,200	24%	23%	10%	20%	7%	2%	0%	–	14%	1%
Vox	14–16 September	1,500	27.6%	22.9%	6.2%	19.8%	7.5%	2.7%	0.3%	0.5% (Note: Bebeto Haddad (DC) and Ricardo Senese (UP) with 0.2%, Altino Prazeres (PSTU) with 0.1%)	12.5%	4.7%
Instituto Veritá	11–15 September	3,020	18.1%	26%	5.4%	32.1%	5.5%	3%	0.2%	1.2% (Note: Bebeto Haddad (DC) with 0.9%, Altino Prazeres (PSTU) with 0.2% and Ricardo Senese (UP) with 0.1% each.)	8.6%	6.1%
Real Time Big Data	13–14 September	1,500	24%	22%	6%	22%	9%	3%	–	1% (Note: The sum of the candidates Altino Prazeres (PSTU), Bebeto Haddad (DC), João Pimenta (PCO) and Ricardo Senese (UP) reached 1%.)	13%	2%
Datafolha	10–12 September	1,204	27%	25%	6%	19%	8%	3%	0%	2%	11%	2%
Paraná Pesquisas	9–12 September	1,500	25.1%	24.7%	7.1%	21%	7.9%	2.1%	0.5%	0.8% (Note: Bebeto Haddad (DC) and Ricardo Senese (UP) with 0.3% each and Altino Prazeres (PSTU) with 0.2%.)	11%	0.4%
Futura/100% Cidades	9–11 September	1,000	26.4%	22%	5.8%	22.8%	7.2%	1.5%	0.1%	1.2% (Note: Bebeto Haddad (DC) with 0.7%, Ricardo Senese (UP) with 0.4% and Altino Prazeres (PSTU) with 0.1% each.)	13%	3.6%
Quaest	8–10 September	1,200	24%	21%	8%	23%	8%	2%	0%	1% (Note: Bebeto Haddad (DC))	13%	1%
AtlasIntel	5–10 September	2,200	20.1%	28%	7.2%	24.4%	10.7%	4.7%	0%	0.7% (Note: Ricardo Senese (UP))	4.2%	3.6%
Datafolha	3–5 September	1,204	22%	23%	7%	22%	9%	3%	0%	2% (Note: Bebeto Haddad (DC) and Ricardo Senese (UP) with 1% each.)	12%	1%
Paraná Pesquisas	2–5 September	1,500	23.8%	23.9%	8.4%	21.3%	7.1%	2.9%	0.2%	1.2% (Note: Bebeto Haddad (DC) with 0.6%; Altino Prazeres (PSTU) and Ricardo Senese (UP) with 0.3% each.)	11.2%	0.1%
Futura/100% Cidades	2–4 September	1,000	23.9%	20.6%	8.9%	26.2%	6.7%	2.2%	0.2%	1.4% (Note: Bebeto Haddad (DC) with 0.9%, Ricardo Senese (UP) with 0.4% and Altino Prazers (PSTU) with 0.1%.)	9.9%	2.3%
Real Time Big Data	31 August–2 September	1,500	20%	20%	8%	21%	9%	3%	–	1%	18%	1%
30 August			Beginning of the period of electoral propaganda on radio and television.									
Quaest	25–27 August	1,200	19%	22%	12%	19%	8%	3%	0%	2% (Note: Bebeto Haddad (DC) with 2%.)	15%	3%
Gerp	23–26 August	1,250	19%	22%	8%	24%	8%	2%	0%	– (Note: The other candidates did not even score 1% each.)	18%	2%
Instituto Veritá	22–26 August	3,020	14.2%	21.6%	6.3%	30.9%	5.8%	3.6%	0.1%	2.4% (Note: Bebeto Haddad (DC) with 1.7%, Ricardo Senese (UP) with 0.4% and Altino Prazers (PSTU) with 0.3%.)	15.1%	9.3%
Futura/100% Cidades	20–24 August	1,000	17.9%	23.3%	9.6%	25.2%	6.2%	2.3%	0%	0.7%	14.7%	1.9%
FESPSP	20–22 August	1,500	21,6%	23.1%	10.7%	16.8%	8.6%	3.9%	0.1%	1.2% (Note: Bebeto Haddad (DC) with 0.6% and Altino Prazers (PSTU) and Ricardo Senese (UP) with 0.3% each.)	13.9%	1.5%
Paraná Pesquisas	19–22 August	1,500	24.1%	21.9%	13.2%	17.9%	7.3%	3.6%	0.6%	0.8% (Note: Bebeto Haddad (DC) with 0.6% and Altino Prazers (PSTU) and Ricardo Senese (UP) with 0.1% each.)	10.6%	2.2%
Datafolha	20–21 August	1,204	19%	23%	10%	21%	8%	4%	1%	1% (Note: Bebeto Haddad (DC) with 1%.)	12%	2%
AtlasIntel	15–20 August	1,803	21.8%	28.5%	9.5%	16.3%	12.0%	4.3%	0%	0.5% (Note: Altino Prazers (PSTU) with 0.3% and Ricardo Senese (UP) with 0.2%.)	7.1%	6.7%
Datafolha	6–8 August	1,092	23%	22%	14%	14%	7%	4%	2%	1% (Note: Voting intentions for Altino Prazeres (PSTU) with 1%; candidates Ricardo Senese (UP) and Fernando Fantauzzi (DC) did not even reach less than 1% each.)	14%	1%
Paraná Pesquisas	4–7 August	1,500	25.1%	23.2%	15.9%	12.5%	5.5%	3.5%	1.1%	1.2% (Note: Voting intentions for Fernando Fantauzzi (DC) with 0.5%; Altino Prazeres (PSTU) with 0.4% and Ricardo Senese (UP) with 0.3%.)	11.9%	1.9%
AtlasIntel	2–7 August	2,037	24.9%	32.7%	9.4%	11.4%	11.2%	3.5%	—N/a	0.7% (Note: Voting intentions for Ricardo Senese (UP) with 0.7%.)	6.2%	7.8%
Futura/100% Cidades	2–5 August	1,000	26.7%	19.9%	12.4%	14.5%	7.3%	1.2%	0.4%	1.3% (Note: Voting intentions for Kim Kataguiri with 1.1%; candidates Ricardo Senese (UP) and Altino Prazeres had 0.1% each.)	16.3%	6.8%
Futura/100% Cidades	2–5 August	1,000	27.2%	19.3%	11.8%	15.3%	9.1%	3.1%	—N/a	—N/a	14.2%	7.9%
Futura/100% Cidades	2–5 August	1,000	30.4%	23.5%	—N/a	16.3%	8.6%	3.6%	—N/a	—N/a	17.6%	6.9%
5 August			The deadline for holding party conventions. After this date, parties must officially announce their candidates.									
1 August			Kim Kataguiri officially withdraws from the race, stating that his candidacy was sabotaged by the Brazil Union. He announced at the same press conference his support for Ricardo Nunes' candidacy.									
Pollster/client(s)	Date(s) conducted	Sample size	Nunes MDB	Boulos PSOL	Datena PSDB	Marçal PRTB	Amaral PSB	Kataguiri UNIÃO	M. Helena NOVO	Others	Abst. Undec.	Lead
Quaest	25–28 July	1,002	20%	19%	19%	12%	5%	3%	3%	2% (Note: Ricardo Senese (UP) and Altino Prazeres (PSTU) with 1% each)	17%	1%
Quaest	25–28 July	1,002	21%	19%	19%	13%	6%	2%	4%	—N/a	16%	2%
Quaest	25–28 July	1,002	24%	22%	—N/a	15%	8%	3%	5%	—N/a	23%	2%
Quaest	25–28 July	1,002	26%	23%	—N/a	15%	8%	—N/a	6%	—N/a	22%	3%
Quaest	25–28 July	1,002	33%	24%	—N/a	—N/a	9%	—N/a	8%	—N/a	26%	9%
20 July			At the PSOL party convention, with the presence of President Lula, the "Love for São Paulo" ticket alliance and the candidates for mayor and vice mayor are confirmed – Guilherme Boulos and Marta Suplicy.									
Pollster/client(s)	Date(s) conducted	Sample size	Nunes MDB	Boulos PSOL	Datena PSDB	Amaral PSB	Marçal PRTB	Kataguiri UNIÃO	M. Helena NOVO	Others	Abst. Undec.	Lead
FESPSP	16–18 July	1,500	22%	26%	12%	5%	11%	3%	2%	—N/a	19%	4%
Paraná Pesquisas	14–17 July	1,500	26.9%	24.7%	11.6%	6.4%	10.9%	2.4%	3.6%	1.7% (Note: João Pimenta (PCO) with 0.9%; Ricardo Senese (UP) and Altino Prazeres (PSTU) with 0.3% each and Fernando Fantauzzi (DC) with 0.2%)	11.6%	2.2%
Paraná Pesquisas	14–17 July	1,500	27.7%	24.8%	11.8%	6.8%	11.5%	—N/a	3.7%	1.9% (Note: João Pimenta (PCO) with 0.9%; Ricardo Senese (UP) with 0.4% and Fernando Fantauzzi (DC) and Altino Prazeres (PSTU) with 0.3% each)	11.9%	2.9%
Paraná Pesquisas	14–17 July	1,500	31.9%	27.5%	—N/a	7.7%	12.2%	—N/a	4.4%	2.4% (Note: João Pimenta (PCO) with 1.1%; Ricardo Senese (UP) with 0.6%; Fernando Fantauzzi (DC) with 0.4% and Altino Prazeres (PSTU) with 0.3%)	13.8%	4.4%
Datafolha	2–4 July	1,092	24%	23%	11%	7%	10%	3%	5%	4% (Note: Altino Prazeres (PSTU), Fernando Fantauzzi (DC), Ricardo Senese (UP) and João Pimenta (PCO) with 1% each)	13%	1%
Datafolha	2–4 July	1,092	26%	25%	—N/a	9%	12%	—N/a	7%	5% (Note: João Pimenta (PCO) with 2%; Altino Prazeres (PSTU), Fernando Fantauzzi (DC) and Ricardo Senese (UP) with 1% each)	16%	1%
RealTime Big Data	25–28 June	1,500	28%	29%	8%	7%	12%	5%	1%	0% (Note: Altino Prazeres (PSTU), Fernando Fantauzzi (DC), Ricardo Senese (UP) and João Pimenta (PCO) did not reach 1%)	10%	1%
RealTime Big Data	25–28 June	1,500	29%	29%	9%	8%	14%	—N/a	1%	0%	10%	Tie
Futura/100% Cidades	24–25 June	1,000	20.4%	24.2%	13.5%	5.5%	12.7%	3.2%	3%	1% (Note: Fernando Fantauzzi (DC) with 0.6%, Ricardo Senese (UP) with 0.3% and João Pimenta (PCO) with 0.1%.)	16.4%	3.8%
Futura/100% Cidades	24–25 June	1,000	24.6%	24.8%	—N/a	8.5%	14.1%	—N/a	3.5%	—N/a	24.5%	0.2%
Futura/100% Cidades	24–25 June	1,000	25.2%	22.7%	17.5%	8.1%	—N/a	—N/a	—N/a	—N/a	26.5%	2.5%
Futura/100% Cidades	24–25 June	1,000	24.5%	24.4%	—N/a	10%	12.3%	—N/a	—N/a	—N/a	28.8%	0.1%
Quaest	22–25 June	1,002	22%	21%	17%	6%	10%	3%	4%	2% (Note: João Caproni Pimenta (PCO) and Ricardo Senese (UP) with 1% each.)	15%	1%
Quaest	22–25 June	1,002	25%	23%	19%	8%	—N/a	5%	4%	—N/a	16%	2%
Quaest	22–25 June	1,002	24%	23%	16%	8%	11%	—N/a	5%	—N/a	13%	1%
Quaest	22–25 June	1,002	28%	24%	—N/a	10%	13%	—N/a	6%	—N/a	19%	4%
Quaest	22–25 June	1,002	30%	25%	—N/a	10%	—N/a	5%	8%	—N/a	22%	5%
Paraná Pesquisas	19–24 June	1,500	28.5%	25.9%	8.3%	8.7%	10%	2.7%	3.1%	1.2% (Note: João Pimenta (PCO) with 0.4%; Fernando Fantauzzi (DC) and Ricardo Senese (UP) with 0.3% each; Altino Prazeres (PSTU) with 0.2%)	11.6%	2.6%
Paraná Pesquisas	19–24 June	1,500	31.1%	27%	—N/a	11.2%	11.9%	—N/a	3.9%	1.7% (Note: Altino Prazeres (PSTU) and Ricardo Senese (UP) with 0.5% each; João Pimenta (PCO) with 0.4% and Fernando Fantauzzi (DC), 0.3%)	13.4%	4.1%
Instituto Veritá	15–19 June	1,202	16.9%	28.9%	13.4%	4.4%	14%	4.1%	2.1%	2.3% (Note: Fernando Fantauzzi (DC) with 1.1%; João Pimenta (PCO) with 0.8%; Altino Prazeres (PSTU) with 0.3% and Ricardo Senese (UP) with 0.1%)	13.3%	12%
Instituto Gerp	13–17 June	1,000	21%	20%	9%	6%	9%	3%	2%	0% (Note: Altino Prazeres (PSTU))	30%	1%
Atlas/CNN	10–11 June	2,220	23.4%	35.7%	5.8%	10.7%	12.6%	6.9%	2%	0%	2.9%	12.3%
Atlas/CNN	10–11 June	2,220	32.4%	37.5%	—N/a	11.8%	—N/a	8.2%	3.2%	0%	6.9%	5.1%
Datafolha	27–28 May	1,092	23%	24%	8%	8%	7%	4%	4%	4% (Note: Altino Prazeres (PSTU); Fernando Fantauzzi (DC), Ricardo Senese (UP) and João Caproni Pimenta (PCO) with 1% each)	18%	1%
Datafolha	27–28 May	1,092	26%	24%	—N/a	9%	9%	—N/a	6%	5% (Note: João Caproni Pimenta (PCO) with 3%; Altino Prazeres (PSTU) and Fernando Fantauzzi (DC) with 1% each one)	21%	2%
Paraná Pesquisas	24–28 May	1,500	28.1%	24.2%	12.1%	9.1%	5.1%	3.4%	3.2%	0.8% (Note: Altino Prazeres (PSTU) with 0.5%; João Caproni Pimenta (PSTU), Fernando Fantauzzi (DC) and Ricardo Senese (UP) with 0.1% each)	14%	3.9%
Paraná Pesquisas	24–28 May	1,500	28.2%	24.2%	12.1%	9.3%	5.1%	3.4%	3.2%	—N/a	14%	4%
Paraná Pesquisas	24–28 May	1,500	33.1%	26.9%	—N/a	11.5%	6.9%	—N/a	4.1%	—N/a	16.7%	6.2%
Atlas/CNN	22–27 May	1,670	20.5%	37.2%	7.9%	9.9%	10.4%	7.9%	3.5%	0.5% (Note: Altino Prazeres (PSTU))	2.3%	16.7%
Atlas/CNN	22–27 May	1,670	32.6%	37.2%	—N/a	11.1%	—N/a	9.3%	3.7%	1.2% (Note: Altino Prazeres (PSTU))	5%	4.6%
24 May			The Brazilian Labour Renewal Party confirms the candidacy of Pablo Marçal.									
15 May			The Brazilian Social Democracy Party confirms the candidacy of José Luiz Datena.									
Pollster/client(s)	Date(s) conducted	Sample size	Nunes MDB	Boulos PSOL	Datena PSDB	Amaral PSB	Marçal PRTB	Kataguiri UNIÃO	M. Helena NOVO	Others	Abst. Undec.	Lead
Futura/100% Cidades	6–7 May	1,000	27.1%	26.1%	—N/a	9.7%	—N/a	5.1%	4.9%	—N/a	26.9%	1%
Futura/100% Cidades	6–7 May	1,000	23%	22.6%	15.2%	8.6%	—N/a	—N/a	—N/a	0.7% (Note: Abraham Weintraub (PMB))	19.8%	0.4%
Paraná Pesquisas	26 April–1 May	1,200	27.3%	25.7%	15.3%	8.2%	2.3%	4%	3.6%	0.3% (Note: Altino Prazeres (PSTU))	13.5%	1.6%
Paraná Pesquisas	26 April–1 May	1,200	35.2%	29.8%	—N/a	10.6%	—N/a	—N/a	5.7%	1.7% (Note: Altino Prazeres (PSTU))	17.2%	5.4%
AtlasIntel	18–22 April	1,629	33.7%	35.6%	—N/a	14.7%	—N/a	9.4%	3.5%	—N/a	3.1%	1.9%
Instituto Badra	11–13 April	1,500	26%	17%	—N/a	10%	4%	2%	4%	1%	36%	9%
Instituto Badra	11–13 April	1,500	30%	20%	—N/a	16%	—N/a	—N/a	—N/a	—N/a	33%	10%
Instituto Badra	11–13 April	1,500	30% (Note: With Sonaira Fernandes (Republicanos) as his running mate.)	21% (Note: With Marta Suplicy (PT) as his running mate.)	—N/a	17% (Note: With José Luiz Datena (PSDB) as her running mate.)	—N/a	—N/a	—N/a	—N/a	31%	9%
Paraná Pesquisas	13–18 March	1,350	32%	30.1%	—N/a	9.6%	—N/a	5.7%	5.9%	1% (Note: Altino Prazeres (PSTU))	15.7%	1.9%
Paraná Pesquisas	13–18 March	1,350	34.3%	30.6%	—N/a	10.5%	—N/a	—N/a	6.3%	1.3% (Note: Altino Prazeres (PSTU))	17%	3.7%
Datafolha	7–8 March	1,090	29%	30%	—N/a	8%	—N/a	4%	7%	2% (Note: Altino Prazeres (PSTU))	20%	1%
Datafolha	7–8 March	1,090	30%	29%	—N/a	9%	—N/a	—N/a	7%	1% (Note: Altino Prazeres (PSTU))	23%	1%
Datafolha	7–8 March	1,090	33%	33%	—N/a	—N/a	—N/a	—N/a	8%	2% (Note: Altino Prazeres (PSTU))	24%	Tie
RealTime Big Data	1–2 March	2,000	29%	34%	—N/a	10%	—N/a	6%	1%	1% (Note: Padre Kelmon (DC))	19%	5%
Paraná Pesquisas	14–19 February	1,502	32%	33%	—N/a	9.7%	—N/a	5.2%	3.3%	0.7% (Note: Padre Kelmon (DC))	16.1%	1%
Paraná Pesquisas	14–19 February	1,502	34.7%	33.4%	—N/a	10.5%	—N/a	—N/a	3.8%	—N/a	17.6%	1.3%

==== 2023 ====
Pollster/client(s)	Date(s) conducted	Sample size	Nunes MDB	Boulos PSOL	Amaral PSB	Kataguiri UNIÃO	M. Helena NOVO	Others	Abst. Undec.	Lead
AtlasIntel	25–30 December	1,600	18%	29.5%	6.2%	5.3%	0.6%	18.4% (Note: Ricardo Salles (PL) with 17.6% and Marco Vinholi (PSDB) with 0.8%)	22.1%	11.5%
AtlasIntel	25–30 December	1,600	23.1%	37.9%	8%	6.8%	0.7%	23.5% (Note: Ricardo Salles (PL) with 22.5% and Marco Vinholi (PSDB) with 1%)	—N/a	14.8%
ABC Dados	18 December	1,061	16%	29%	8%	10%	—N/a	12% (Note: Ricardo Salles (PL))	25%	13%
Instituto Veritá	14–16 December	1,003	5.5%	18.7%	1.2%	3.4%	2.1%	34.5% (Note: Marcos Pontes (PL), 15.8%; Marta Suplicy (PT), 14.0% Pablo Marçal (independent), 2.8%; Marco Vinholi (PSDB), 1.9%)	34.4%	13.2%
Instituto Veritá	14–16 December	1,003	10.2%	24.2%	—N/a	—N/a	—N/a	16.3% (Note: Ricardo Salles (PL), 16.3%)	49.3%	7.9% (Note: Against Ricardo Salles (PL))
Futura Inteligência	11–13 December	1,015	21%	25.6%	8.4%	4.4%	3.3%	9.4% (Note: Ricardo Salles (PL))	27.8%	4.6%
Futura Inteligência	11–13 December	1,015	21%	24.6%	8.3%	4.3%	—N/a	16.1% (Note: Marcos Pontes (PL) with 13% and Vinicius Poit (NOVO) with 3.1%)	27.6%	3.6%
Paraná Pesquisas	6–9 December	1,046	25.4%	31.1%	8.9%	5.4%	3.1%	8.9% (Note: Ricardo Salles (PL) with 8.3% and Marco Vinholi (PSDB) with 0.6%)	17.3%	5.7%
Paraná Pesquisas	6–9 December	1,046	29.1%	32.4%	9.2%	6.4%	3.9%	—N/a	19%	3.3%
Badra	2–4 October	2,500	21%	29%	7%	5%	—N/a	3% (Note: Vinicius Poit (NOVO))	35%	8%
Badra	2–4 October	2,500	20%	28%	—N/a	4%	—N/a	12% (Note: Márcio França (PSB) with 9% and Vinicius Poit (NOVO) with 3%)	36%	8%
Badra	2–4 October	2,500	25%	30%	9%	—N/a	—N/a	—N/a	36%	5%
Paraná Pesquisas	21–24 September	1,066	29%	35.1%	7.5%	5.3%	—N/a	2.8% (Note: Vinicius Poit (NOVO))	20.3%	6.1%
20 September			The party Solidariedade announces support to Nunes' reelection.							
Pollster/client(s)	Date(s) conducted	Sample size	Nunes MDB	Boulos PSOL	Amaral PSB	Kataguiri UNIÃO	Poit NOVO	Others	Abst. Undec.	Lead
Datafolha	29–30 August	1,092	24%	32%	11%	8%	2%	—N/a	23%	8%
5 August			Workers' Party (PT) announces support to Boulos' candidacy.							
Pollster/client(s)	Date(s) conducted	Sample size	Nunes MDB	Boulos PSOL	E. Bolsonaro PL	Amaral PSB	Kataguiri UNIÃO	Others	Abst. Undec.	Lead
Instituto Gerp	10–17 July	800	6%	26%	18%	5%	2%	4% (Note: Rodrigo Garcia (PSDB) with 3% and Fernando Holiday (PL) with 1%.)	39%	8%
28 June			José Luiz Datena withdraws from the race.							
5 June			Ricardo Salles withdraws from the race.							
Pollster/client(s)	Date(s) conducted	Sample size	Nunes MDB	Boulos PSOL	Datena PDT	Salles PL	Amaral PSB	Others	Abst. Undec.	Lead
Paraná Pesquisas	30 Apr–4 May	1,208	17.8%	31.5%	—N/a	10.9%	7.1%	5.4% (Note: Vinicius Poit (NOVO))	27.3%	13.7%
Paraná Pesquisas	30 Apr–4 May	1,208	13.6% (Note: If endorsed by Planning Minister Simone Tebet (MDB))	39.2% (Note: If endorsed by President Luiz Inácio Lula da Silva (PT))	—N/a	20.4% (Note: If endorsed by former president Jair Bolsonaro (PL))	7.7% (Note: If endorsed by Vice President Geraldo Alckmin (PSB))	5% (Note: Vinicius Poit (NOVO) with 5%, if endorsed by Minas Gerais Governor Romeu Zema (NOVO))	—N/a	18.8%
Paraná Pesquisas	23–26 February	1,012	7.9%	26.3%	24.3%	4.8%	3.9%	13.4% (Note: Rodrigo Garcia (PSDB) with 8.5%, Kim Kataguiri (UNIÃO) with 3.3% and Vinicius Poit (NOVO) with 1.6%)	19.4%	2%
Paraná Pesquisas	23–26 February	1,012	8.6%	32%	—N/a	—N/a	5.1%	33.6% (Note: Eduardo Bolsonaro (PL) with 19.1%, Rodrigo Garcia (PSDB) with 8.9%, Kim Kataguiri (UNIÃO) with 3.5% and Vinicius Poit (NOVO) with 2.1%)	20.7%	12.1%
Paraná Pesquisas	23–26 February	1,012	11.1%	32.9%	—N/a	7.5%	5.2%	17.4% (Note: Rodrigo Garcia (PSDB) with 10.3%, Kim Kataguiri (UNIÃO) with 4.5% and Vinicius Poit (NOVO) with 2.6%)	25.9%	21.8%
Paraná Pesquisas	23–26 February	1,012	15%	36.7%	—N/a	10.1%	—N/a	8.4% (Note: Kim Kataguiri (UNIÃO) with 5.3% and Vinicius Poit (NOVO) with 3.1%)	29.8%	11.7%

=== Second round ===
==== Guilherme Boulos and Ricardo Nunes ====
Pollster/client(s)	Date(s) conducted	Sample size	Nunes MDB	Boulos PSOL	Abst. Undec.	Lead
Datafolha	8–9 October	1,204	55%	33%	12%	22%
Paraná Pesquisas	7–9 October	1,200	52.8%	39%	8.2%	13.8%
Fespsp	7–9 October	1,500	51.4%	35.9%	12.7%	15.5%
First round - 6 October
Quaest	4–5 October	2,400	51%	33%	16%	18%
Datafolha	4–5 October	2,052	52%	37%	11%	15%
AtlasIntel	29 Sep–4 Oct	2,500	46%	37%	18%	9%
Real Time Big Data	2–3 October 2024	1,000	48%	36%	16%	12%
Datafolha	1–3 October 2024	1,806	52%	37%	11%	15%
Real Time Big Data	30 Sep–1 Oct 2024	1,500	48%	35%	17%	13%
Futura/100% Cidades	30 Sep–1 Oct 2024	1,000	53.9%	27%	19.1%	26.9%
Ideia	27 Sep–1 Oct 2024	1,200	54%	33%	13%	21%
Paraná Pesquisas	27–30 September 2024	1,500	51.5%	33.6%	14.9%	17.9%
Quaest	27–29 September 2024	1,800	49%	33%	18%	16%
AtlasIntel	24–29 September 2024	2,190	48%	37%	15%	11%
Real Time Big Data	27–28 September 2024	1,500	49%	34%	17%	15%
Paraná Pesquisas	23–26 September 2024	1,500	51.6%	32.7%	15.7%	18.9%
Quaest	21–23 September 2024	1,200	49%	32%	19%	17%
AtlasIntel	17–22 September 2024	2,218	39.5%	41.7%	18.8%	2.2%
Real Time Big Data	20–21 September 2024	1,500	47%	35%	18%	12%
Paraná Pesquisas	16–19 September 2024	1,500	50.1%	32.1%	17.8%	18%
Futura/100% Cidades	16–18 September 2024	1,000	49%	30.9%	20.1%	18.1%
Datafolha	17–19 September 2024	1,204	52%	37%	11%	15%
Quaest	15–17 September 2024	1,200	46%	35%	19%	11%
Real Time Big Data	13–14 September 2024	1,500	47%	34%	19%	13%
Datafolha	10–12 September 2024	1,204	53%	38%	9%	15%
Paraná Pesquisas	9–12 September 2024	1,500	51.1%	33.6%	15.3%	17.5%
Futura/100% Cidades	9–11 September 2024	1,000	52.6%	26.8%	20.6%	25.8%
Quaest	8–10 September 2024	1,200	48%	33%	19%	15%
AtlasIntel	5–10 September 2024	2,200	45.7%	38.5%	15.8%	7.2%
Datafolha	3–5 September 2024	1,204	49%	37%	14%	12%
Paraná Pesquisas	2–5 September 2024	1,500	49.7%	33.6%	16.6%	16.1%
Futura/100% Cidades	2–4 September 2024	1,000	54.1%	27.8%	18.1%	26.3%
Real Time Big Data	31 August–2 September 2024	1,500	45%	35%	20%	10%
Quaest	25–27 August 2024	1,200	46%	33%	21%	13%
Futura/100% Cidades	20–24 August 2024	1,000	46.7%	30.9%	22.4%	15.8%
FESPSP	20–22 August 2024	1,500	41.9%	36.2%	21.9%	5.7%
Paraná Pesquisas	19–22 August 2024	1,500	50.7%	34.2%	15.1%	16.5%
Datafolha	20–21 August 2024	1,204	47%	38%	15%	9%
AtlasIntel	15–20 August 2024	1,803	40.9%	36.8%	22.4%	4.1%
Datafolha	6–8 August 2024	1,092	49%	36%	15%	13%
Paraná Pesquisas	4–7 August 2024	1,500	50.1%	35.5%	14.4%	14.6%
AtlasIntel	2–7 August 2024	2,037	42%	42.4%	15.6%	0.4%
Futura/100% Cidades	2–5 August 2024	1,000	50.2%	32.3%	17.5%	17.9%
Quaest	25–28 July 2024	1,002	45%	32%	23%	13%
FESPSP	16–18 July 2024	1,500	43%	36%	21%	7%
FESPSP	16–18 July 2024 (Note: Possible second round scenarios in which voters are informed that Marta Suplicy (PT) is Boulos' running mate and that Ricardo Mello (PL) is Nunes' running mate.)	1,500	36%	46%	18%	10%
FESPSP	16–18 July 2024 (Note: Possible second round scenarios in which voters are informed of President Lula's (PT) support for Boulos' candidacy and former President Bolsonaro's (PL) support for Nunes' candidacy.)	1,500	38%	46%	16%	8%
Paraná Pesquisas	14–17 July 2024	1,500	50.5%	35%	14.5%	15.5%
Datafolha	2–4 July 2024	1,092	48%	38%	14%	10%
RealTime Big Data	25–28 June 2024	1,500	46%	39%	15%	7%
Quaest	22–25 June 2024	1,002	46%	34%	20%	12%
Paraná Pesquisas	19–24 June 2024	1,500	49%	33.9%	17%	15.1%
Atlas/CNN	10–11 June 2024	2,220	44%	46%	10%	2%
Paraná Pesquisas	24–28 May 2024	1,500	48.1%	35.9%	16%	12.2%
Atlas/CNN	22–27 May 2024	1,670	46%	43.5%	10.4%	2.5%
Futura/100% Cidades	6–7 May 2024	1,000	44.4%	33.9%	21.6%	10.5%
Paraná Pesquisas	26 April–1 May 2024	1,200	46.8%	37.6%	15.7%	9.2%
Atlas/Intel	18–22 April 2024	1,629	44.8%	44.3%	10.9%	0.5%
Paraná Pesquisas	13–18 March 2024	1,350	46%	39.1%	14.9%	6.9%
RealTime Big Data	1–2 March 2024	2,000	40%	38%	22%	2%
Paraná Pesquisas	14–19 February 2024	1,502	43.3%	39.6%	17.1%	3.7%
AtlasIntel	25–30 December 2023	1,600	37.2%	33.8%	29%	3.4%
Instituto Veritá	14–16 December 2023	1,003	24.4%	27.6%	47.9%	3.2%
Paraná Pesquisas	6–9 December 2023	1,046	41.3%	39.8%	19%	1.5%

==== Guilherme Boulos and Pablo Marçal ====
Pollster/client(s)	Date(s) conducted	Sample size	Boulos PSOL	Marçal PRTB	Abst. Undec.	Lead
Real Time Big Data	2–3 October 2024	1,000	41%	40%	19%	1%
Datafolha	1–3 October 2024	1,806	48%	36%	16%	12%
Real Time Big Data	30 Sep–1 Oct 2024	1,500	40%	39%	21%	1%
Futura/100% Cidades	30 Sep–1 Oct 2024	1,000	40.2%	42.4%	17.4%	2.2%
Ideia	27 Sep–1 Oct 2024	1,200	45%	35%	21%	10%
Paraná Pesquisas	27–30 September 2024	1,500	45.1%	39.1%	15.8%	6%
Quaest	27–29 September 2024	1,800	41%	36%	23%	5%
AtlasIntel	24–29 September 2024	2,190	48%	40%	12%	8%
Real Time Big Data	27–28 September 2024	1,500	41%	38%	21%	3%
Paraná Pesquisas	23–26 September 2024	1,500	43.7%	36.6%	19.7%	7.1%
Quaest	21–23 September 2024	1,200	41%	36%	23%	5%
AtlasIntel	17–22 September 2024	2,218	44.4%	38.5%	17.1%	5.9%
Real Time Big Data	20–21 September 2024	1,500	40%	38%	22%	2%
Paraná Pesquisas	16–19 September 2024	1,500	43.6%	37.9%	18.5%	5.7%
Futura/100% Cidades	16–18 September 2024	1,000	40.8%	36.3%	22.9%	4.5%
Datafolha	17–19 September 2024	1,204	50%	36%	14%	14%
Quaest	15–17 September 2024	1,200	42%	36%	22%	6%
Real Time Big Data	13–14 September 2024	1,500	39%	38%	23%	1%
Datafolha	10–12 September 2024	1,204	47%	38%	15%	9%
Paraná Pesquisas	9–12 September 2024	1,500	43.3%	37.2%	19.5%	6.1%
Futura/100% Cidades	9–11 September 2024	1,000	40.3%	37.5%	22%	2.8%
Quaest	8–10 September 2024	1,200	40%	39%	21%	1%
AtlasIntel	5–10 September 2024	2,200	44.1%	43.2%	12.7%	0.9%
Datafolha	3–5 September 2024	1,204	45%	39%	15%	6%
Paraná Pesquisas	2–5 September 2024	1,500	43.1%	37.9%	19.0%	5.2%
Futura/100% Cidades	2–4 September 2024	1,000	37.7%	43.4%	18.9%	5.7%
Real Time Big Data	31 August–2 September 2024	1,500	40%	37%	23%	3%
Quaest	25–27 August 2024	1,200	38%	38%	24%	Tie
Futura 100% Cidades	20–24 August 2024	1,000	39.4%	39.3%	21.3%	0.1%
Paraná Pesquisas	19–22 August 2024	1,500	42.9%	38.3%	18.8%	4.6%
AtlasIntel	15–20 August 2024	1,803	38.4%	35.4%	26.2%	3%
AtlasIntel	2–7 August 2024	2,037	44.1%	35.2%	20.7%	8.9%
Futura/100% Cidades	2–5 August 2024	1,000	40.1%	30.7%	29.2%	9.4%
Quaest	25–28 July 2024	1,002	37%	33%	30%	4%
Paraná Pesquisas	14–17 July 2024	1,500	44.8%	33.7%	21.5%	11.1%
RealTime Big Data	25–28 June 2024	1,500	40%	33%	27%	7%
Paraná Pesquisas	19–24 June 2024	1,500	45.5%	29.3%	25.1%	16.2%
Atlas/CNN	10–11 June 2024	2,220	48%	38%	14%	10%

==== Guilherme Boulos and Tabata Amaral ====
Pollster/client(s)	Date(s) conducted	Sample size	Boulos PSOL	Amaral PSB	Abst. Undec.	Lead
AtlasIntel	24–29 September 2024	2,190	37%	35%	28%	2%
AtlasIntel	17–22 September 2024	2,218	31.5%	33.2%	35.3%	1.7%
AtlasIntel	5–10 September 2024	2,200	33.8%	33.8%	32.4%	Tie
Futura/100% Cidades	2–4 September 2024	1,000	32.8%	33.1%	34.1%	0.3%
AtlasIntel	15–20 August 2024	1,803	29.8%	29.1%	41.1%	0.7%
AtlasIntel	2–7 August 2024	2,037	37.7%	27.4%	34.9%	10.3%
Futura/100% Cidades	2–5 August 2024	1,000	33.9%	31.7%	34.4%	2.2%
RealTime Big Data	25–28 June 2024	1,500	40%	44%	16%	4%
Paraná Pesquisas	19–24 June 2024	1,500	40%	34%	26%	6%
Atlas/CNN	10–11 June 2024	2,220	40%	34%	26%	6%
Paraná Pesquisas	24–28 May 2024	1,500	41.7%	32.2%	26.1%	9.5%
Atlas/CNN	22–27 May 2024	1,670	37.7%	25.5%	36.8%	12.2%
Futura/100% Cidades	6–7 May 2024	1,000	35.4%	32%	32.6%	3.4%
Paraná Pesquisas	26 April–1 May 2024	1,200	43.6%	33.9%	22.5%	9.7%
Paraná Pesquisas	13–18 March 2024	1,350	43.3%	34.3%	22.4%	9%
Paraná Pesquisas	14–19 February 2024	1,502	43.4%	30.4%	26.1%	13%

==== Guilherme Boulos and José Luiz Datena ====
Pollster/client(s)	Date(s) conducted	Sample size	Boulos PSOL	Datena PSDB	Abst. Undec.	Lead
Quaest	25–27 August 2024	1,200	34%	40%	26%	6%
AtlasIntel	15–20 August 2024	1,803	35.6%	27.5%	36.9%	8.1%
Paraná Pesquisas	4–7 August 2024	1,500	39%	43%	18%	4%
AtlasIntel	2–7 August 2024	2,037	39.9%	29.5%	30.7%	10.4%
Futura/100% Cidades	2–5 August 2024	1,000	36.5%	35.5%	28%	1%
RealTime Big Data	25–28 June 2024	1,500	40%	38%	22%	2%
Quaest	22–25 June 2024	1,002	35%	43%	22%	8%
Atlas/CNN	10–11 June 2024	2,220	44%	27%	28%	17%
Atlas/CNN	22–27 May 2024	1,670	41.5%	27.9%	30.6%	13.6%

==== Ricardo Nunes and Pablo Marçal ====
Pollster/client(s)	Date(s) conducted	Sample size	Nunes MDB	Marçal PRTB	Abst. Undec.	Lead
Real Time Big Data	2–3 October 2024	1,000	43%	35%	22%	8%
Datafolha	1–3 October 2024	1,806	56%	28%	16%	28%
Real Time Big Data	30 Sep–1 Oct 2024	1,500	44%	34%	22%	10%
Futura/100% Cidades	30 Sep–1 Oct 2024	1,000	51.7%	31.2%	17.1%	20.5%
Ideia	27 Sep–1 Oct 2024	1,200	55%	27%	18%	28%
Paraná Pesquisas	27–30 September 2024	1,500	53.9%	28.5%	17.6%	25.4%
Quaest	27–29 September 2024	1,800	53%	26%	21%	27%
AtlasIntel	24–29 September 2024	2,190	46%	30%	24%	16%
Real Time Big Data	27–28 September 2024	1,500	45%	33%	22%	12%
Paraná Pesquisas	23–26 September 2024	1,500	54.7%	25.8%	19.5%	28.9%
Quaest	21–23 September 2024	1,200	52%	25%	23%	27%
AtlasIntel	17–22 September 2024	2,218	47.5%	28%	24.5%	19.5%
Real Time Big Data	20–21 September 2024	1,500	44%	32%	24%	12%
Paraná Pesquisas	16–19 September 2024	1,500	52.3%	27.4%	20.3%	24.9%
Futura/100% Cidades	16–18 September 2024	1,000	57.1%	25.7%	17.2%	31.4%
Datafolha	17–19 September 2024	1,204	60%	25%	15%	35%
Quaest	15–17 September 2024	1,200	47%	27%	26%	20%
Real Time Big Data	13–14 September 2024	1,500	42%	32%	26%	10%
Datafolha	10–12 September 2024	1,204	59%	27%	14%	32%
Paraná Pesquisas	9–12 September 2024	1,500	51.4%	27.3%	21.3%	24.1%
Futura/100% Cidades	9–11 September 2024	1,000	49.3%	28.9%	21.8%	20.4%
Quaest	8–10 September 2024	1,200	50%	30%	20%	20%
AtlasIntel	5–10 September 2024	2,200	48.2%	29.2%	22.6%	19%
Datafolha	3–5 September 2024	1,204	53%	31%	17%	22%
Paraná Pesquisas	2–5 September 2024	1,500	50.1%	27.7%	22.2%	22.4%
Futura/100% Cidades	2–4 September 2024	1,000	50.7%	29.9%	19.4%	20.8%
Real Time Big Data	31 August–2 September 2024	1,500	39%	33%	28%	6%
Quaest	25–27 August 2024	1,200	47%	26%	27%	21%
Futura/100% Cidades	20–24 August 2024	1,000	45.3%	29.9%	24.8%	15.4%
Paraná Pesquisas	19–22 August 2024	1,500	52.1%	25.7%	22.1%	26.4%
Quaest	25–28 July 2024	1,002	46%	22%	32%	24%
RealTime Big Data	25–28 June 2024	1,500	42%	27%	31%	15%

==== Ricardo Nunes and Tabata Amaral ====
Pollster/client(s)	Date(s) conducted	Sample size	Nunes MDB	Amaral PSB	Abst. Undec.	Lead
AtlasIntel	24–29 September 2024	2,190	42%	44%	14%	2%
AtlasIntel	17–22 September 2024	2,218	35.2%	46.8%	18%	11.6%
AtlasIntel	5–10 September 2024	2,200	40.4%	42%	17.6%	1.6%
Futura/100% Cidades	2–4 September 2024	1,000	55%	25.4%	19.6%	29.6%
AtlasIntel	15–20 August 2024	1,803	38.5%	38.8%	22.6%	0.3%
AtlasIntel	2–7 August 2024	2,037	38.3%	43.4%	18.3%	5.1%
Quaest	25–28 July 2024	1,002	47%	26%	27%	21%
RealTime Big Data	25–28 June 2024	1,500	43%	42%	15%	1%
Paraná Pesquisas	19–24 June 2024	1,500	48.3%	30.5%	21.1%	17.8%
Atlas/CNN	10–11 June 2024	2,220	42%	37%	20%	5%
Paraná Pesquisas	24–28 May 2024	1,500	49.5%	30%	20.5%	19.5%
Atlas/CNN	22–27 May 2024	1,670	42.4%	38.3%	19.3%	4.1%
Futura/100% Cidades	6–7 May 2024	1,000	43.9%	30%	26.1%	13.9%
Paraná Pesquisas	26 April–1 May 2024	1,200	49.6%	30.8%	19.7%	18.8%
Atlas/Intel	18–22 April 2024	1,629	42.6%	44.3%	13.1%	1.7%
Paraná Pesquisas	13–18 March 2024	1,350	48.4%	30%	21.6%	18.4%
Paraná Pesquisas	14–19 February 2024	1,502	48.3%	28.8%	22.9%	19.5%
AtlasIntel	25–30 December 2023	1,600	36.5%	26.3%	37.1%	10.2%

==== Ricardo Nunes and José Luiz Datena ====
Pollster/client(s)	Date(s) conducted	Sample size	Nunes MDB	Datena PSDB	Abst. Undec.	Lead
Futura/100% Cidades	2–4 September 2024	1,000	57.7%	21.7%	20.6%	36%
Quaest	25–27 August 2024	1,200	45%	31%	24%	14%
Paraná Pesquisas	19–22 August 2024	1,500	52.5%	32.1%	15.3%	20.4%
AtlasIntel	15–20 August 2024	1,803	40.8%	28.7%	30.5%	12.1%
Paraná Pesquisas	4–7 August 2024	1,500	47.2%	35%	17.8%	12.2%
AtlasIntel	2–7 August 2024	2,037	38.7%	28.9%	32.4%	9.8%
Paraná Pesquisas	14–17 July 2024	1,500	47.7%	29.3%	23%	18.4%
RealTime Big Data	25–28 June 2024	1,500	44%	37%	19%	7%
Quaest	22–25 June 2024	1,002	43%	34%	23%	9%
Atlas/CNN	10–11 June 2024	2,220	43%	30%	27%	13%
Atlas/CNN	22–27 May 2024	1,670	45.4%	21.4%	33.2%	24%

==== Tabata Amaral and José Luiz Datena ====
Pollster/client(s)	Date(s) conducted	Sample size	Amaral PSB	Datena PSDB	Abst. Undec.	Lead
Atlas/CNN	10–11 June 2024	2,220	38%	36%	26%	2%
Atlas/CNN	22–27 May 2024	1,670	39.8%	21.6%	38.6%	18.2%

==== Pablo Marçal and José Luiz Datena ====
Pollster/client(s)	Date(s) conducted	Sample size	Marçal PRTB	Datena PSDB	Abst. Undec.	Lead
Quaest	25–27 August 2024	1,200	34%	40%	26%	6%

==== Pablo Marçal and Tabata Amaral ====
Pollster/client(s)	Date(s) conducted	Sample size	Marçal PRTB	Amaral PSB	Abst. Undec.	Lead
AtlasIntel	24–29 September 2024	2,190	38%	56%	6%	18%
AtlasIntel	17–22 September 2024	2,218	36.9%	48.8%	14.3%	11.9%
AtlasIntel	5–10 September 2024	2,200	43.4%	49.8%	6.8%	6.4%

== Results ==
=== Mayor ===
Candidate	Running mate	Party	First round		Second round	
Candidate	Running mate	Party	Votes	%	Votes	%
Ricardo Nunes (incumbent)	Ricardo de Mello Araújo (PL)	Brazilian Democratic Movement	1,801,139	29.49	3,393,110	59.35
Guilherme Boulos	Marta Suplicy (PT)	Socialism and Liberty Party	1,776,127	29.08	2,323,901	40.65
Pablo Marçal	Antônia de Jesus	Brazilian Labour Renewal Party	1,719,274	28.15		
Tabata Amaral	Lúcia França	Brazilian Socialist Party	605,552	9.91		
Datena	José Aníbal	Brazilian Social Democracy Party	112,344	1.84		
Marina Helena	Reynaldo Priell Neto	New Party	84,212	1.38		
Ricardo Senese	Julia Sousa	Popular Unity	5,593	0.09		
Altino Prazeres	Silvana Garcia	United Socialist Workers' Party	3,017	0.05		
João Pimenta	Francisco Muniz	Workers' Cause Party	960	0.02		
Total			6,108,218	100.00	5,717,011	100.00
Valid votes			6,108,218	90.18	5,717,011	89.58
Invalid votes			423,635	6.25	430,756	6.75
Blank votes			241,734	3.57	234,317	3.67
Total votes			6,773,587	100.00	6,382,084	100.00
Registered voters/turnout			9,322,444	72.66	9,322,444	68.46
MDB hold						

Popular vote (first round)
Nunes	29.48%
Boulos	29.07%
Marçal	28.14%
Amaral	9.91%
Others	6.39%

Popular vote (second round)
Nunes	59.35%
Boulos	40.65%

=== Municipal Chamber ===
Party or alliance		Votes	%	Seats	+/–
Brazil of Hope	Workers' Party	771,092	13.34	8	Steady
Brazil of Hope	Green Party	49,834	0.86	1	Steady
Brazil of Hope	Communist Party of Brazil	31,367	0.54	0	Steady
Brazil Union		698,045	12.07	7	New
Brazilian Democratic Movement		679,422	11.75	7	▲4
Liberal Party		662,936	11.47	7	▲5
PSOL REDE; Federation	Socialism and Liberty Party	602,035	10.41	6	Steady
PSOL REDE; Federation	Sustainability Network	48,025	0.83	1	▲1
Podemos		544,082	9.41	6	▲3
Progressistas		355,445	6.15	4	▲3
Social Democratic Party		300,464	5.20	3	Steady
Brazilian Socialist Party		243,502	4.21	2	Steady
Republicans		202,858	3.51	2	▼2
New Party		142,809	2.47	1	▼1
Brazilian Labour Renewal Party		130,784	2.26	0	Steady
Solidariedade		72,735	1.26	0	Steady
Democratic Labour Party		62,810	1.09	0	Steady
Democratic Renewal Party		51,350	0.89	0	New
PSDB Cidadania; Federation	Brazilian Social Democracy Party	48,649	0.84	0	▼8
PSDB Cidadania; Federation	Cidadania	3,633	0.06	0	Steady
Avante		40,271	0.70	0	Steady
Popular Unity		14,074	0.24	0	Steady
National Mobilization		10,979	0.19	0	Steady
United Socialist Workers' Party		6,096	0.11	0	Steady
Christian Democracy		5,821	0.10	0	Steady
Workers' Cause Party		1,029	0.02	0	Steady
Brazilian Woman's Party		919	0.02	0	Steady
Brazilian Communist Party		0	0.00	0	Steady
Agir		0	0.00	0	Steady
Total		5,781,066	100.00	55	–
Valid votes		5,781,066	85.35		
Invalid votes		471,899	6.97		
Blank votes		520,622	7.69		
Total votes		6,773,587	100.00		
Registered voters/turnout		9,322,444	72.66		

==== Members elected ====
Candidate	Party	%	Votes
Lucas Pavanato	PL	2.78	161,386
Ana Carolina Oliveira	PODE	2.24	129,563
Murilo Lima	PP	1.96	113,820
Sargento Nantes	PP	1.94	112,484
Amanda Paschoal	PSOL	1.87	108,654
Rubinho Nunes	UNIÃO	1.75	101,549
Luna Zarattini	PT	1.74	100,921
Luana Alves	PSOL	1.44	83,262
Sandra Tadeu	PL	1.29	74,511
Sandra Alves	UNIÃO	1.28	74,192
Silvio Leite	UNIÃO	1.10	63,988
Isac Félix	PL	1.07	62,275
Zoe Martinez	PL	1.04	60,272
Rodrigo Goulart	PSD	1.04	58,715
Danilo Cortez	PODE	1.01	58,676
Gabriel Abreu	PODE	1.01	58,581
Edir Sales	PSD	1.00	58,190
Alessandro Guedes	PT	1.00	58,183
Celso Giannazi	PSOL	1.00	57,789
Cris Monteiro	NOVO	0.98	56,904
Silvio Pereira	UNIÃO	0.92	53,453
Thammy Miranda	PSD	0.87	50,234
Nabil Bonduki	PT	0.85	49,540
Janaina Paschoal	PP	0.84	48,893
Fabio Riva	MDB	0.77	44,627
Marcos Palumbo	PP	0.75	43,455
Rute Costa	PL	0.74	43,090
Sidney Cruz	MDB	0.74	42,988
George Hato	MDB	0.74	42,837
Sansão Pereira	Republicanos	0.73	42,229
André Santos	Republicanos	0.71	41,379
Hélio Rodrigues	PT	0.70	40,753
Amanda Vettorazzo	UNIÃO	0.69	40,144
Marcelo Messias	MDB	0.69	40,079
Marina Bragante	REDE	0.68	39,147
Xexéu Tripoli	PV	0.67	39,039
Simone Ganem	PODE	0.66	38,540
Sandra Santana	MDB	0.66	38,326
João Jorge	MDB	0.63	36,296
Ely Teruel	MDB	0.61	35,622
Toninho Vespoli	PSOL	0.60	34,735
Sílvia Ferraro	PSOL	0.60	34,537
Sonaira Fernandes	PL	0.59	33,957
Milton Ferreira	PODE	0.58	33,493
João Ananias	PT	0.57	33,225
Kenji Palumbo	PODE	0.56	32,495
Ricardo Teixeira	UNIÃO	0.54	31,566
Jair Tatto	PT	0.53	30,905
Eliseu Gabriel	PSB	0.53	30,706
Dheison Silva	PT	0.53	30,575
Senival Moura	PT	0.53	30,480
Renata Falzoni	PSB	0.52	30,206
Keit Lima	PSOL	0.48	27,769
Adrilles Jorge	UNIÃO	0.43	25,038
Gilberto Nascimento	PL	0.38	22,306
