= Ricardo Nunes =

Ricardo Nunes may refer to:

- Ricardo Nunes (footballer, born 1982), Portuguese goalkeeper
- Ricardo Nunes (footballer, born 1986), South African defender
- Ricardo Nunes (politician) (born 1967), Brazilian businessman and politician, mayor of São Paulo since 2021
