= Marina Bragante =

Brazilian psychologist and politician

- Marina in 2026

Member-elect of the Legislative Assembly of São Paulo
- Incumbent
- Assumed office 1 February 2027

Member of the São Paulo City Council
- Incumbent
- Assumed office 1 January 2025

Personal details
- Born: Marina Amadeu Batista Bragante; 9 April 1979 (age 47) São Paulo, São Paulo, Brazil
- Party: PSB (2026–present)
- Other political affiliations: REDE (until 2026)
- Children: 3
- Education: Pontifical Catholic University of São Paulo; Harvard University
- Occupation: Psychologist
- Website: marinabragante.com.br

Marina Amadeu Batista Bragante (April 9, 1979) is a Brazilian psychologist and politician affiliated with the Brazilian Socialist Party (PSB). Since 2025, she has served as a city councilwoman in São Paulo.

== Biography ==
=== First years and education ===
Marina was born in the city of São Paulo in 1979. She earned her bachelor’s degree in psychology from the Pontifical Catholic University of São Paulo (PUC-SP). She earned a master’s degree in public administration from Harvard University in the United States.

=== Politics ===
In 2020, she ran for city councilor in São Paulo as a candidate for the Sustainability Network (REDE) party but was not elected. Running again for REDE, she sought a seat on the Municipal Chamber of São Paulo. She was elected after receiving nearly 40,000 votes. She became the first city councilwoman in São Paulo elected by the party.

In April 2026, she left REDE, citing dissatisfaction with the party’s direction. After an invitation from Tabata Amaral, she joined the Brazilian Socialist Party (PSB). Running as a PSB candidate, she ran for state representative in São Paulo. Marina was elected after receiving over 75,000 votes.

==== Electoral performance ====
Year	Office	Party	Votes	Result	Ref.
2020	City Councillor of São Paulo	REDE	9,710	Not elected	
2024	City Councillor of São Paulo	REDE	39,147	Elected	
2026	State Deputy of São Paulo	PSB	78,957	Elected	

== Personal life ==
Marina is the mother of triplets. She is a fan of SC Corinthians Paulista.
