= José Aníbal =

Brazilian economist and politician

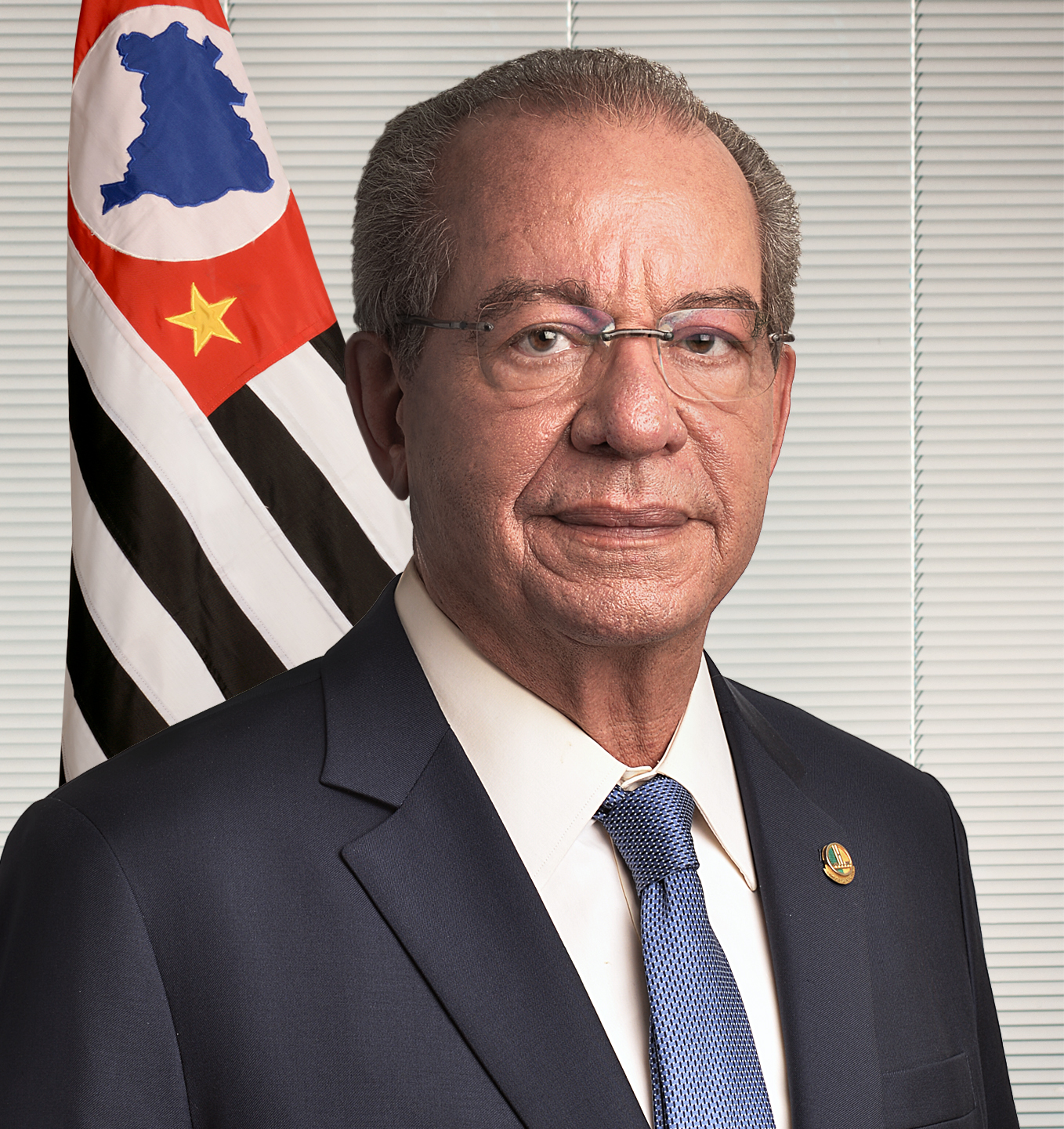

Senator for São Paulo
- In office 11 August 2021 – 31 January 2022
- Preceded by: José Serra
- Succeeded by: José Serra
- In office 17 May 2016 – 22 February 2017
- Preceded by: José Serra
- Succeeded by: José Serra

Chair of the Teotônio Vilela Institute
- In office 15 July 2015 – 11 December 2017
- Preceded by: Tasso Jereissati
- Succeeded by: Tasso Jereissati

Member of the Chamber of Deputies
- In office 1 February 2007 – 1 January 2011
- Constituency: São Paulo
- In office 4 January 1993 – 1 February 1999
- Constituency: São Paulo

Secretary of Energy of São Paulo
- In office 1 January 2011 – 4 April 2014
- Governor: Geraldo Alckmin
- Preceded by: Mauro Guilherme Jardim Arce
- Succeeded by: João Carlos de Souza Meirelles

Member of the Municipal Chamber of São Paulo
- In office 1 January 2005 – 31 March 2006
- Constituency: At-large

Secretary of Development of São Paulo
- In office 2 February 1999 – 5 June 2001
- Governor: Mário Covas (1999–2001); Geraldo Alckmin (2001)
- Preceded by: Flávio Fava de Moraes
- Succeeded by: Ruy Martins Alterfelder Silva

Personal details
- Born: José Aníbal Peres de Pontes; 9 August 1947 (age 78) Guajará-Mirim, Rondônia, Brazil
- Party: PSDB (1989–present)
- Other political affiliations: PT (1979–1980); PMDB (1980–1989)

José Aníbal Peres de Pontes (born 9 August 1947) is a Brazilian economist and politician, affiliated to the Brazilian Social Democracy Party (PSDB). Took office as senator temporarily after José Serra was appointed by acting president Michel Temer as Minister of Foreign Affairs.

== Controversies ==
In 2014, he was investigated in the inquiry that investigated frauds in biddings for the constructions of trains and the subway, scandal that was known as trensalão, in São Paulo, during the governments of the PSDB. This investigation was discontinued by the First Group of the Supreme Federal Court (STF). In that time, the majority of justices understood having no enough evidences of involvement, considering that other witnesses denied their participation in the case. By a note, José Aníbal said the complaints against him have no "factual sustentation" and are based in a "apocryphal, false document".

Non-profit organization positions
Preceded by Tasso Jereissati	Chairman of Teotônio Vilela Institute; 2015–17	Succeeded by Tasso Jereissati
Party political offices
Preceded by Bruno Covas (2016)	PSDB nominee for Vice Mayor of São Paulo; 2024	Most recent
