= Lucas Pavanato =

Brazilian politician and Internet personality (born 1998)

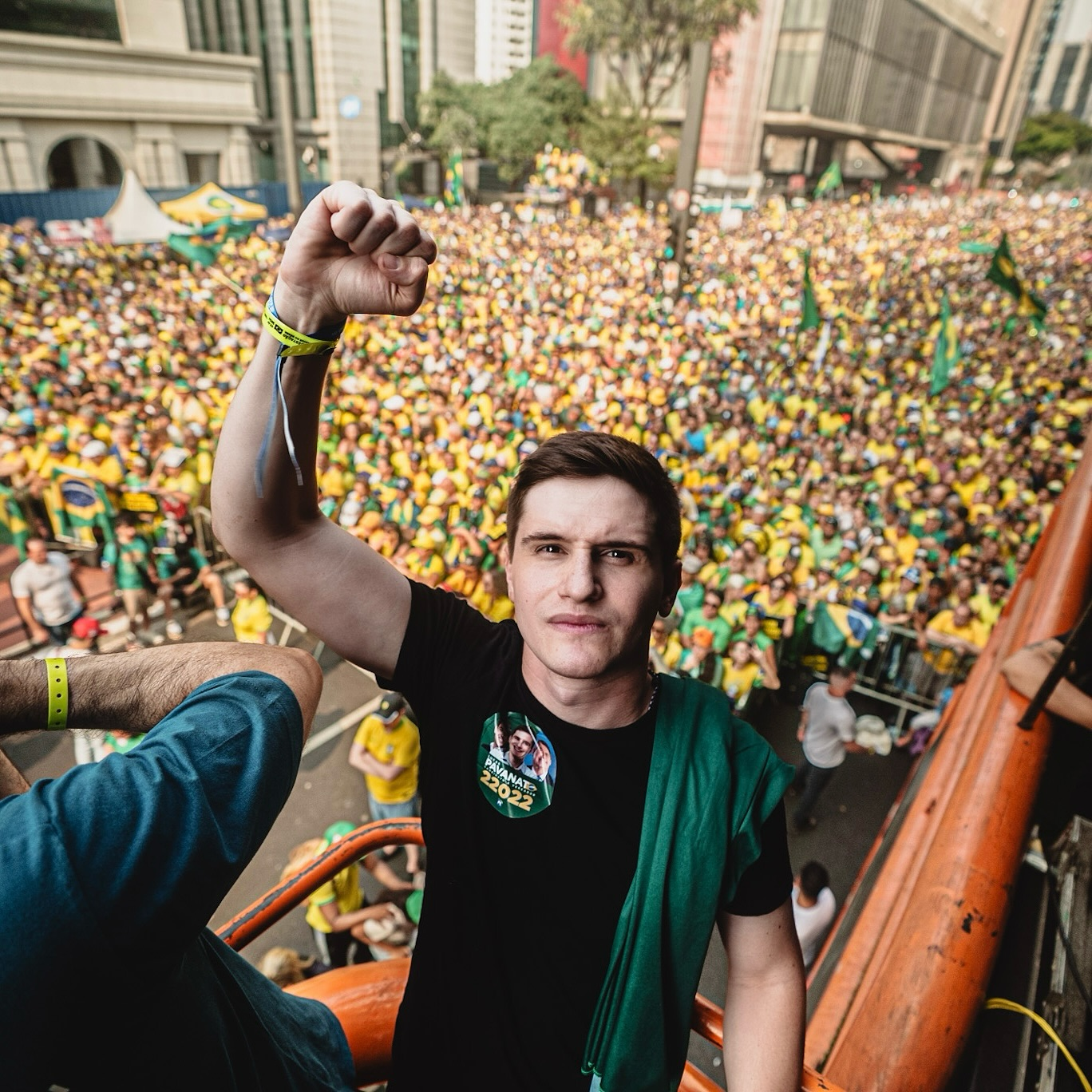

Member-elect of the Chamber of Deputies
- Assuming office 1 February 2027
- Constituency: São Paulo

Member of the Municipal Chamber of São Paulo
- Incumbent
- Assumed office 1 January 2025
- Constituency: At-large

Personal details
- Born: Lucas Pavanato de Oliveira; 12 May 1998 (age 28) Sorocaba, São Paulo, Brazil
- Party: PL (2023–present)
- Other political affiliations: PSC (2016–2020); NOVO (2020–2022); Republicanos (2022–2023)

Instagram information
- Page: lucaspavanato
- Followers: 7 million

TikTok information
- Page: lucaspavanato
- Followers: 3.3 million

YouTube information
- Channel: Lucas Pavanato
- Genre: Politics
- Subscribers: 1.27 million
- Views: 478.303 million
- Last updated: 26 October 2026

Lucas Pavanato de Oliveira (born 12 May 1998) is a Brazilian politician and Internet personality serving as a member of the Municipal Chamber of São Paulo since 2025. He was the most voted candidate in the country in the 2024 municipal elections. As of 2025, he has 2 million followers on Instagram and TikTok, and 1 million followers on YouTube. He was a candidate for the Legislative Assembly of São Paulo in the 2022 election, and became a substitute. He has been a member of the Liberal Party since 2023.

In 2026 he was a candidate for Federal Deputy and was the candidate that received the most votes in São Paulo, with a score of 3.038.438 votes.

== Biography ==
Born in Sorocaba, Pavanato entered political activism in the city of São José dos Campos, where his family settled after his father, Eneias de Oliveira, was employed by Avibras Indústria Aeroespacial. His political involvement began in the local division of the Free Brazil Movement (MBL), which at the time organized acts in favor of the impeachment of President Dilma Rousseff.

In October 2021, the collective mandate Bancada Ativista (PSOL) filed a complaint against councilman Fernando Holiday and Pavanato, his then-advisor, with the Transphobia Parliamentary Inquiry Commission of the Municipal Chamber of São Paulo. Holiday allegedly shared a video authored by Pavanato in which he linked trans women to psychological disorders and the rape of cisgender women.

In 2023, Pavanato was involved in a disturbance on the campus of the Faculty of Philosophy, Languages and Human Sciences, University of São Paulo (FFLCH-USP). According to student accounts, Pavanato arrived at the location accompanied by security guards and began harassing students with provocations while being filmed by aides. Images show the moment when one of the security guards draws a weapon in front of students who were trying to stop the YouTuber from advancing through the campus. Later, the security guard was identified as Marcelo Ferreira, who was off duty.

In 2024, Pavanato and Fernando Holiday were convicted by a federal court in the Federal District for spreading fake news against the singer Maria Gadú. The duo allegedly announced on their social media that they had blocked the payment of her fee for a show held on 18 September 2022, at the "Festa Lítero Musical" in São José dos Campos. This did not happen, and the trial concluded that they had used the allegation to gain an electoral advantage.

In July 2023, he joined the Liberal Party at the invitation of former president Jair Bolsonaro and the party's president, former congressman Valdemar Costa Neto. In the 2024 election, Pavanato ran for a seat in the Municipal Chamber of São Paulo and was elected with 161,386 votes, being the most voted councilor in the city, surpassing the second-placed Carlos Bolsonaro by 30,906 votes.

Pavanato was the only councilman to vote against a bill proposing to change the name of Rua Peixoto Gomide to Rua Sophia Gomide. The bill was approved by the Constitution and Justice Committee (CCJ) of the Municipal Chamber of São Paulo on 11 March 2026.

On 15 August 2026, Pavanato published a video on his social media calling Congresswoman Erika Hilton "Lula's travesti" and claiming she had "used public funds to hire makeup artists." On August 16, the São Paulo Regional Electoral Court issued a preliminary injunction ordering the removal of the video. On September 10, the Court reversed its decision, ruling that the video could remain on social media.

== Political positions ==
Pavanato defines himself as a right-wing conservative, opposing the decriminalization of drugs and abortion, and referring to gender equality policies and affirmative action as a "woke agenda."

== Electoral history ==
Election	Office	Party	Votes	%	
Election	Office	Party	Votes	%	Result
2022 São Paulo State Election	Federal deputy	New Party	36,258	0,16%	Substitute
2024 São Paulo municipal election	City council	Liberal Party	161,386	2,78%	Elected
2026 São Paulo State Election	Federal Deputy	Liberal Party	3.038.438		Elected
