= Marina Helena =

Brazilian politician (born 1980)

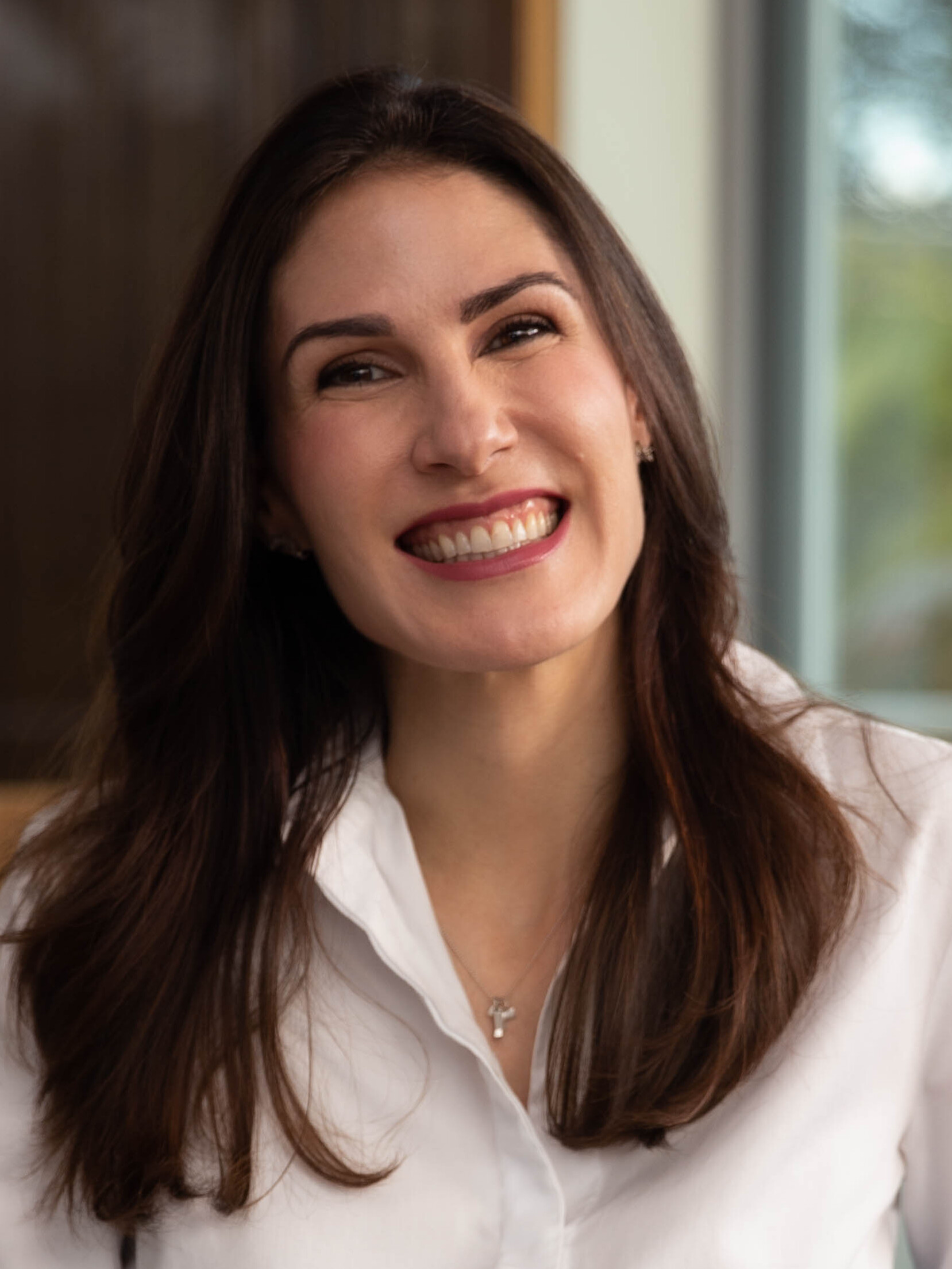
- Marina Helena in 2023

Member-elect of the Chamber of Deputies
- Assuming office 1 February 2027
- Constituency: São Paulo

Personal details
- Born: Marina Helena Cunha Pereira Santos; 10 September 1980 (age 46) Brasília, Federal District, Brazil
- Party: NOVO (2018–present)
- Education: University of Brasília

Marina Helena Cunha Pereira Santos (born 10 September 1980) is a Brazilian politician who was elected member of the Chamber of Deputies in 2026. In the 2024 São Paulo municipal election, she was a candidate for mayor of São Paulo. She is the daughter of Sérgio Cutolo dos Santos.
