= Pablo Marçal =

Brazilian businessman (born 1987)

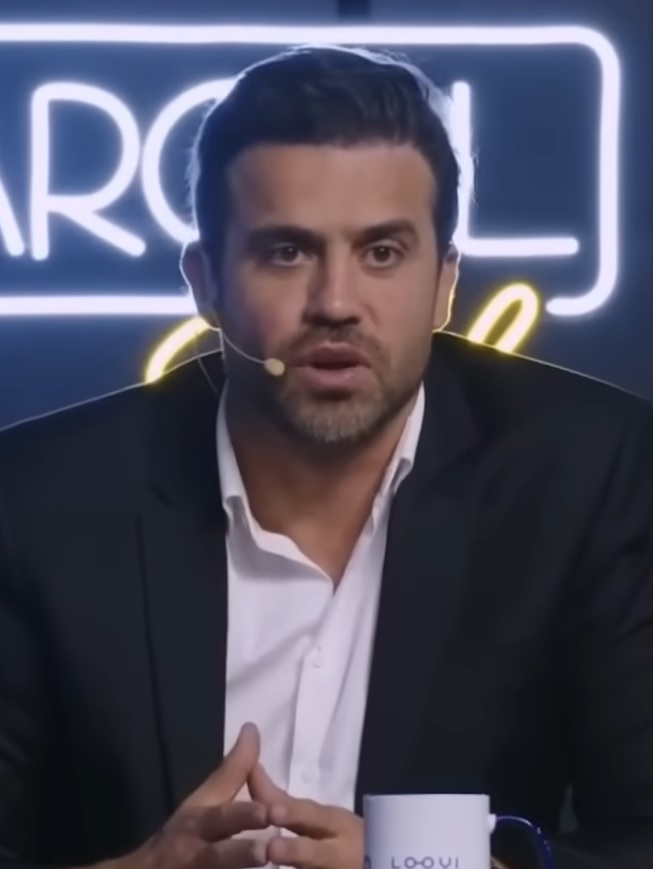
- Marçal in 2024

Personal details
- Born: Pablo Henrique Costa Marçal; 18 April 1987 (age 39) Goiânia, Goiás, Brazil
- Party: UNIÃO
- Other political affiliations: PROS (2022–2023); Solidarity (2023–2024); DC (2024); PRTB (2024-2026)
- Spouse: Ana Carolina Marçal
- Children: 4
- Occupation: Coach; digital influencer; Politician

Pablo Henrique Costa Marçal (Portuguese pronunciation: [ˈpablu ẽj̃ˈʁiki ˈkɔstɐ maʁˈsaw]; born April 18, 1987) is a Brazilian businessman, politician, and digital influencer. He is best known for selling personal development courses on social media. As a member of the Brazilian Labor Renewal Party, he was a candidate for mayor of São Paulo in the 2024 São Paulo mayoral election. Previously, he ran for federal deputy in the 2022 election, but his candidacy was challenged. He also attempted to run for president in 2026, but he was deemed ineligible for 8 years. He then proceeded to become a central part of Flavio Bolsonaro's 2026 campaign for president in the second round of the elections. His widespread rejection among female voters, along with his open hostility to voters who voted for alternative right wing candidates in the first round has been widely attributed as a key part of the failure of the campaign

== Biography ==
Pablo Henrique Costa Marçal was born on 18 April 1987, in Goiânia, Goiás. At the age of 18, he began his career as a call center attendant at the now-defunct Brasil Telecom.

He led an expedition to Pico dos Marins — one of the highest peaks in the Serra da Mantiqueira — which required the rescue of firefighters due to the exposure of 32 people to life-threatening risks.

== São Paulo mayoral campaign ==
Marçal registered his candidacy to run for mayor of São Paulo in the 2024 São Paulo mayoral election. He campaigned on a right-wing platform, portrayed himself as a political outsider and engaged in contentious rhetoric while criticizing leftist policies. Marçal also proposed an austerity program for the city, trimming "incompetent" workers in the public sector and pledged to promote job creation.

On 15 September 2024, Marçal was hospitalised after being assaulted by fellow mayoral candidate José Luiz Datena with a metal chair during a televised debate on TV Cultura. This followed Marçal and Datena arguing over allegations of sexual misconduct involving the latter.

Marçal placed third in the first round of the election and failed to advance to the runoff.

== Controversies ==
=== Financial scams ===
In 2010, at 23 years old, Marçal was found guilty for being in a gang, which diverted money from the banks in 2005, when he was 18 years old. The group created fake websites of financial institutions and sent emails to steal personal information of victims using a Trojan horse. Marçal fixed the computers for the company and denied knowing the illicit acts. In 2019, his sentence was revoked after passing the statute of limitations.

=== Treatment of workers ===
Marçal is the owner of the company Plataforma Internacional, which is being investigated for disregarding sanitary regulations using the COVID-19 pandemic, such as the use of medical masks and social distancing.

=== Fake news posting ===
In the context of the 2022 Brazilian general election, Marçal published content that associated the Brazilian Workers' Party with the distribution of LGBTQIA+ content in schools. The content was eliminated as determined by the Brazilian Superior Electoral Court, on the grounds that it was "circular disinformation".

A post by Marçal, which reported sexual assault against a child, was removed from Instagram for violating the platform's terms of use. The video, which showed the scene of a child being forcibly kissed, ended up being recorded on Marajó Island, and was posted a few days after Damares Alves denounced, without evidence, torture, mutilation, sexual abuse and human trafficking against children in that island.

In January 2024, Marçal became a meme and was criticized for his speech in a lecture, where he said he would have identified a failure in a helicopter before the pilot and would then have calmed him down. Several users accused the story of being untrue, including aviation expert and former United Airlines mechanic Lito Sousa.

On May 8, 2024, the Attorney General of the Union (AGU) took Marçal to court over false news spread about the military's actions in the floods in Rio Grande do Sul.

On August 9, 2024, the Regional Electoral Court of São Paulo ordered Marçal to remove publications from social media that associated Guilherme Boulos, also a candidate for Mayor of the capital, with drug use. The request to Justice was made by Guilherme Boulos' campaign during the municipal elections in the same year. The defense of the PSOL candidate stated that Pablo “invented and provided fake news during a debate on TV Bandeirantes and in posts published on social media in the early hours of the 8th or 9th of the same month”.

On August 13, 2024, the Regional Electoral Court of São Paulo determined for the second time that Pablo Marçal, remove videos and posts against his opponent Guilherme Boulos from social networks. According to the court judge, the posts made by Marçal against Boulos have the sole objective of dissemination and have no electoral relevance for São Paulo residents who must choose the next mayor of the capital of São Paulo in October of this year.

On October 4, 2024, Marçal released a medical report, later found to be falsified, appearing to show that Boulos was using cocaine.

=== Suspect of money laundering ===
In August 2022, Marçal was the record holder in self-financing, having donated more than 500.000 Brazilian reais to his own campaign. There are promises that these amounts donated to the campaign were later passed on to Pablo Marçal's companies, in order to hide the origin of the money. Some of the orders were not fulfilled, as only a games room and a publisher were located at the address of the companies' headquarters. Marçal complained of political persecution.

=== Omission of asset declaration submitted to the Superior Electoral Court ===
Pablo Marçal allegedly hid 22.000.000 Brazilian reais in the asset declaration he presented to the Superior Electoral Court (TSE) to run in the 2024 municipal elections. Marçal reduced the value of two companies and did not declare one to the Electoral Court.

== Published books ==
- 8 Caminhos que Levam à Riqueza (2022)
- A Chave Mestra do Universo (2022)
- Destravar Digital (2022)
- Como Fazer um Milhão Antes dos 20 (2022)
- Antimedo (2023)
- Os Códigos Do Mindset Da Prosperidade (2023)
- O Destravar Da Inteligência Emocional (2023)
- Os Códigos do Milhão (2023)
- A Arte de Negociar (2023)
- A Arte de Confrontar (2024)
- A Arte de Prosperar (2024)
- Sangue, Suor, Lágrimas e Gordura (2024)
