= Bruno Covas =

Former mayor of São Paulo, Brazil

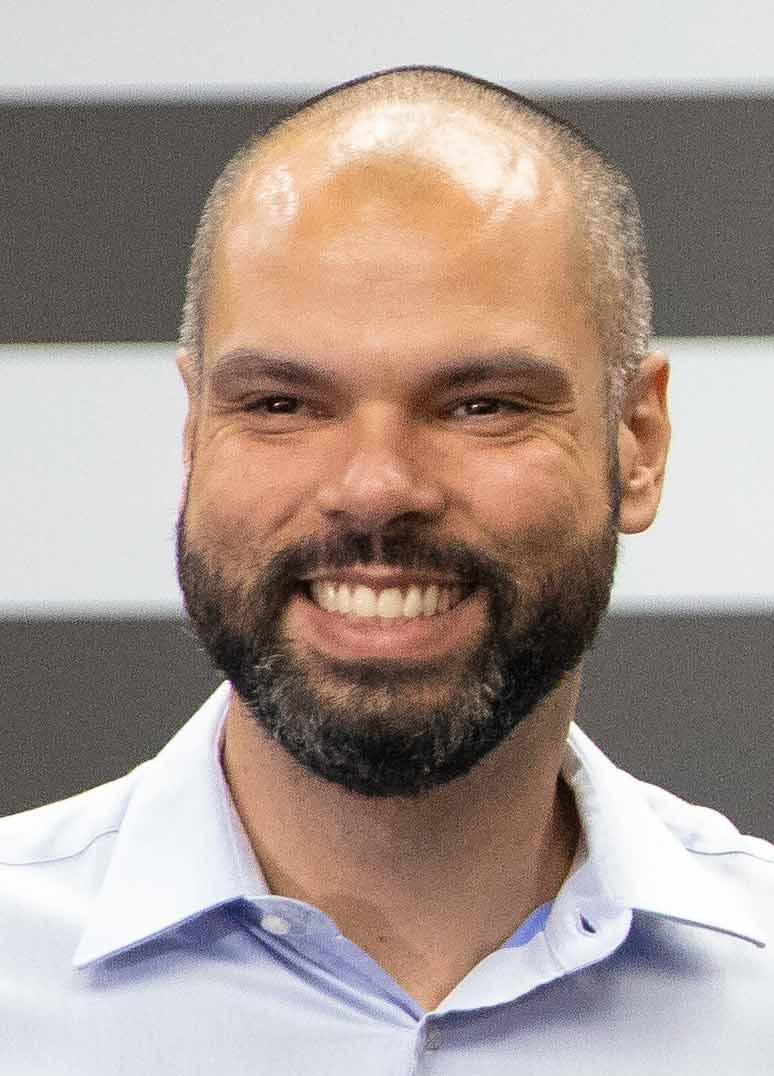
- Covas in 2019

Mayor of São Paulo
- In office 7 April 2018 – 3 May 2021
- Deputy: None (2018–2021); Ricardo Nunes (Jan–May 2021)
- Preceded by: João Doria
- Succeeded by: Ricardo Nunes

Deputy Mayor of São Paulo
- In office 1 January 2017 – 7 April 2018
- Mayor: João Doria
- Preceded by: Nádia Campeão
- Succeeded by: Ricardo Nunes

Member of the Chamber of Deputies
- In office 1 February 2015 – 1 January 2017
- Constituency: São Paulo

State Deputy of São Paulo
- In office 4 April 2014 – 1 February 2015
- Constituency: At-large
- In office 15 March 2007 – 1 January 2011
- Constituency: At-large

Secretary of the Environment of São Paulo
- In office 1 January 2011 – 4 April 2014
- Governor: Geraldo Alckmin
- Preceded by: Pedro Ubiratan de Azevedo
- Succeeded by: Patricia Faga Iglecias

Personal details
- Born: Bruno Covas Lopes; 7 April 1980 Santos, São Paulo, Brazil
- Died: 16 May 2021 (aged 41) São Paulo, Brazil
- Cause of death: Gastrointestinal cancer
- Resting place: Paquetá Cemetery, Santos, São Paulo, Brazil; 23.938591°S 46.317374°W
- Party: PSDB (1998–2021)
- Spouse: Karen Ichiba (m. 2004; div. 2014)
- Children: Tomás (b. 2005)
- Relatives: Mário Covas (grandfather)
- Education: University of São Paulo (LLB); Pontifical Catholic University of São Paulo (BEc)
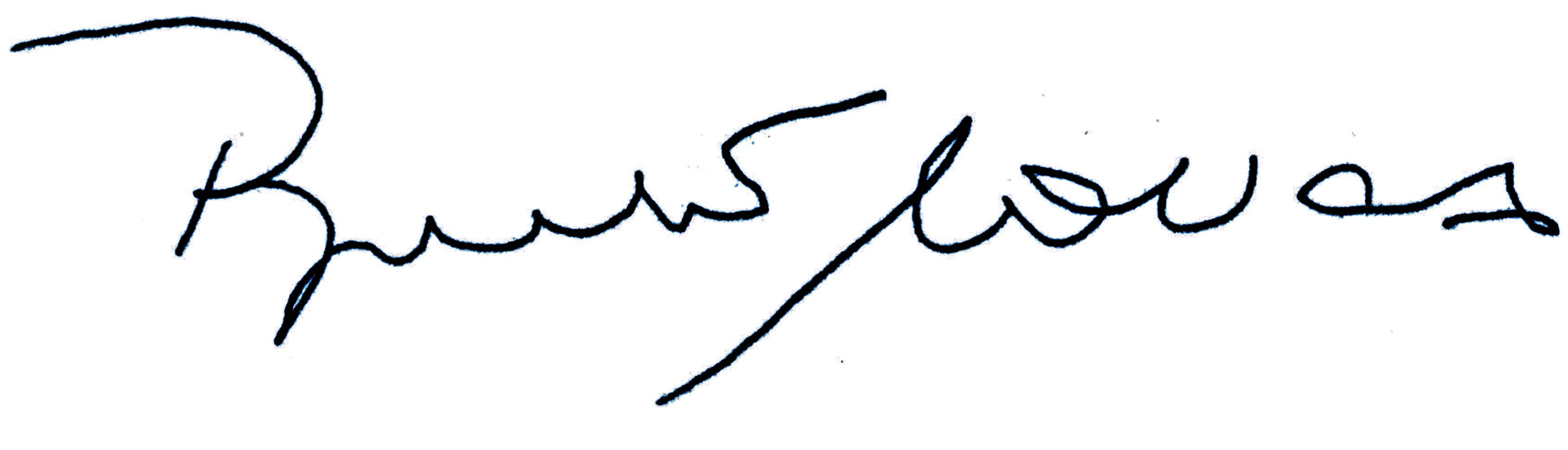
- Signature

Bruno Covas Lopes (7 April 1980 – 16 May 2021) was a Brazilian lawyer, economist, and politician who was a member of the Brazilian Social Democracy Party (PSDB) and served as the mayor of São Paulo from 2018 until his death in 2021.

Covas was the grandson of former São Paulo state governor Mário Covas. Before becoming mayor, Bruno Covas had served as national president of PSDB Youth and São Paulo state secretary for the environment. In October 2016, Covas was elected deputy mayor of São Paulo, as the running mate of PSDB mayoral candidate João Doria. In early April 2018, Covas took office as mayor after João Doria resigned to run for the state governorship in the 2018 general elections.

Covas was diagnosed with gastrointestinal cancer in October 2019, in the form of an adenocarcinoma, but continued to serve as mayor while receiving chemotherapy. In November 2020, his disease had stabilised, and Covas was elected as mayor, beating Socialism and Liberty Party (PSOL) candidate Guilherme Boulos. In May 2021, Covas was admitted to Hospital Sírio-Libanês after his cancer had spread to his liver and bones, and he requested an administrative leave of office for 30 days. He died on 16 May 2021, becoming the first mayor of São Paulo to die in office.

== Early life ==
Bruno Covas Lopes was born on 7 April 1980 in Santos, a beach town near the city of São Paulo, to Renata Covas Lopes and Pedro Lopes. His maternal grandfather, Mário Covas, was one of seven founders of the PSDB in 1988, and had served as governor of the state of São Paulo from 1995 until his death in 2001 due to bladder cancer. Mário Covas had been the PSDB presidential candidate in 1989, was widely considered the likely PSDB presidential candidate for 2002, and had also been a close ally of President Fernando Henrique Cardoso.

During his childhood, Bruno Covas attended the Carmo and Lusíadas schools in Santos, and accompanied his grandfather on trips to Brasília, the federal capital, when the elder Covas served as a senator. In 1995, Covas moved to São Paulo to study at the Bandeirantes School, and lived with his grandfather at the Palácio dos Bandeirantes while the latter was serving as state governor. Covas earned a law degree from the University of São Paulo (USP) in 2002 and a degree in economics from the Pontifical Catholic University of São Paulo (PUC-SP) in 2005.

== Career ==
=== Student politics ===
At the age of 18, Covas formally joined the PSDB in 1998. He held various positions in PSDB Youth, the party's youth organization, being elected as its first secretary in 1999, state president in 2003, and national president in 2007. He served as the organization's national president from 2007 to 2011.

=== Public debut ===
Bruno Covas began his public political career in 2004, when he ran on the PSDB ticket for deputy mayor of Santos along with mayoral candidate Raul Christiano. Christiano had originally extended the invitation to Bruno's mother Renata Covas, but she told Christiano to ask Bruno, as he was the family politician. Their ticket placed fourth during the first round of the election, garnering 28,012 votes, or 11.52% of the total.

In 2005 and 2006, he was a legislative aide to the leadership of Geraldo Alckmin's government in the Legislative Assembly.

=== State deputy ===
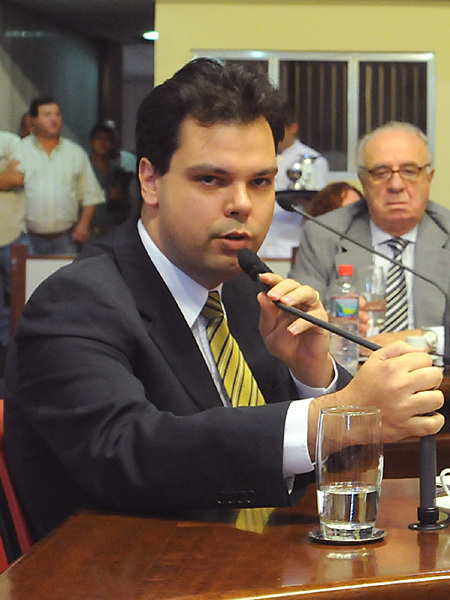
Covas as state deputy in 2009

In 2006, he ran for State Deputy and was elected with 122,312 votes, one of the highest in that election. Conscious Vote Movement considered Covas the most active deputy of the 16th Legislature from 2007 to 2010.

Covas was president of the Committee of Finances and Budget of the first biennium (2007–2008). He also was part of the Committees of Human Rights and Defense of Consumer Rights and was president of the Parliamentary Front of the Luso-Brazilian Community and Coordinator of the Front DST-Aids.

Covas was the rapporteur for more than 180 bills, including the state budget for two consecutive years (2009 and 2010) and the Nota Fiscal Paulista, which decreased the tax burden and gave back taxes directly to citizens. He was president of the Parliamentary Committee of Inquiry (CPI) of the Central Office of Collection and Distribution (ECAD), rapporteur of the CPI of the Housing and Urban Development Company (CDHU), and member of the CPI of the Housing Cooperative Bank (BANCOOP).

In the 2010 election, Covas was re-elected State Deputy with 239,150 votes, the highest number received by any São Paulo State Assembly candidate that year, drawing 131,000 votes from the capital alone.

=== State secretary ===
In 2011, Covas was appointed to the office as State Secretary of the Environment in the new government of Geraldo Alckmin, and vacated his position as State Deputy to assume the secretarial office.

=== Federal deputy ===
Bruno Covas was elected a federal deputy in 2014 for the 55th Legislature (2015–2019). He voted "Yes" for opening the impeachment of Dilma Rousseff. While in the government of President Michel Temer, he voted "Yes" on Public Spending Ceiling Bill.

In 2015, Covas was a sub-rapporteur of the CPI of Petrobras and a member of the special committee reviewing the age of criminal responsibility.

=== Mayor ===
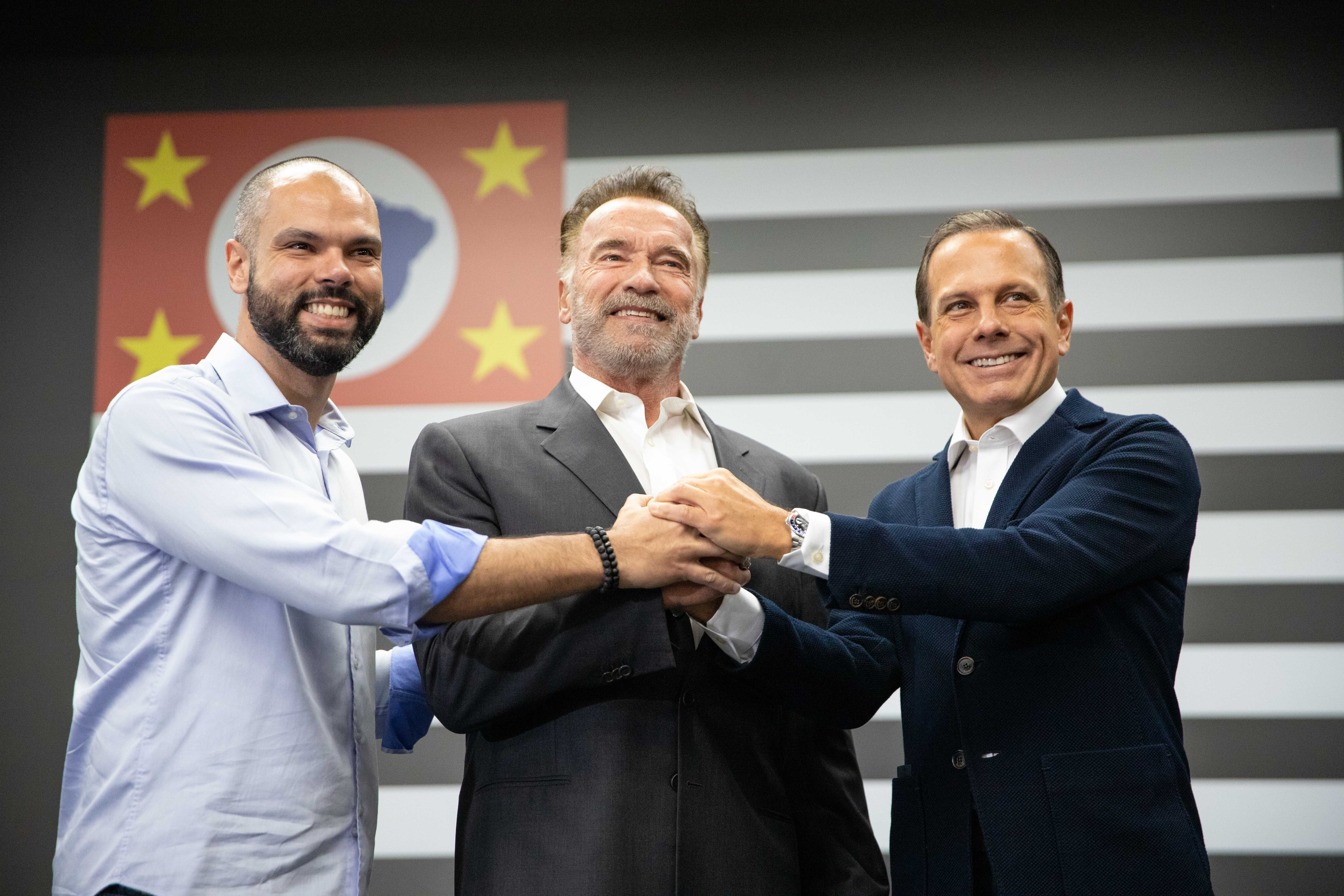
With Arnold Schwarzenegger (c.), former governor of California, and João Doria (r.), governor of São Paulo, 2019

Covas was elected deputy mayor of São Paulo in the first round of the 2016 mayoral election, alongside winning mayoral candidate João Doria. To assume the deputy mayoralty, Covas resigned from his position as federal deputy. On 7 April 2018, his 38th birthday, Covas assumed the mayoralty after Doria left the office to run for the governorship.

Campaigning as a centrist in a divided city, Covas was elected mayor in the 2020 mayoral election, alongside deputy mayoral candidate Ricardo Nunes of the Brazilian Democratic Movement (MDB). The ticket received 1,754,013 votes in the first round, winning each of the city's 58 electoral zones and advancing to the runoff in a 13-candidate field. In the second round, Covas obtained 3,169,121 votes (59.38%), beating PSOL candidate Guilherme Boulos by just over 1 million votes.

== Illness and death ==
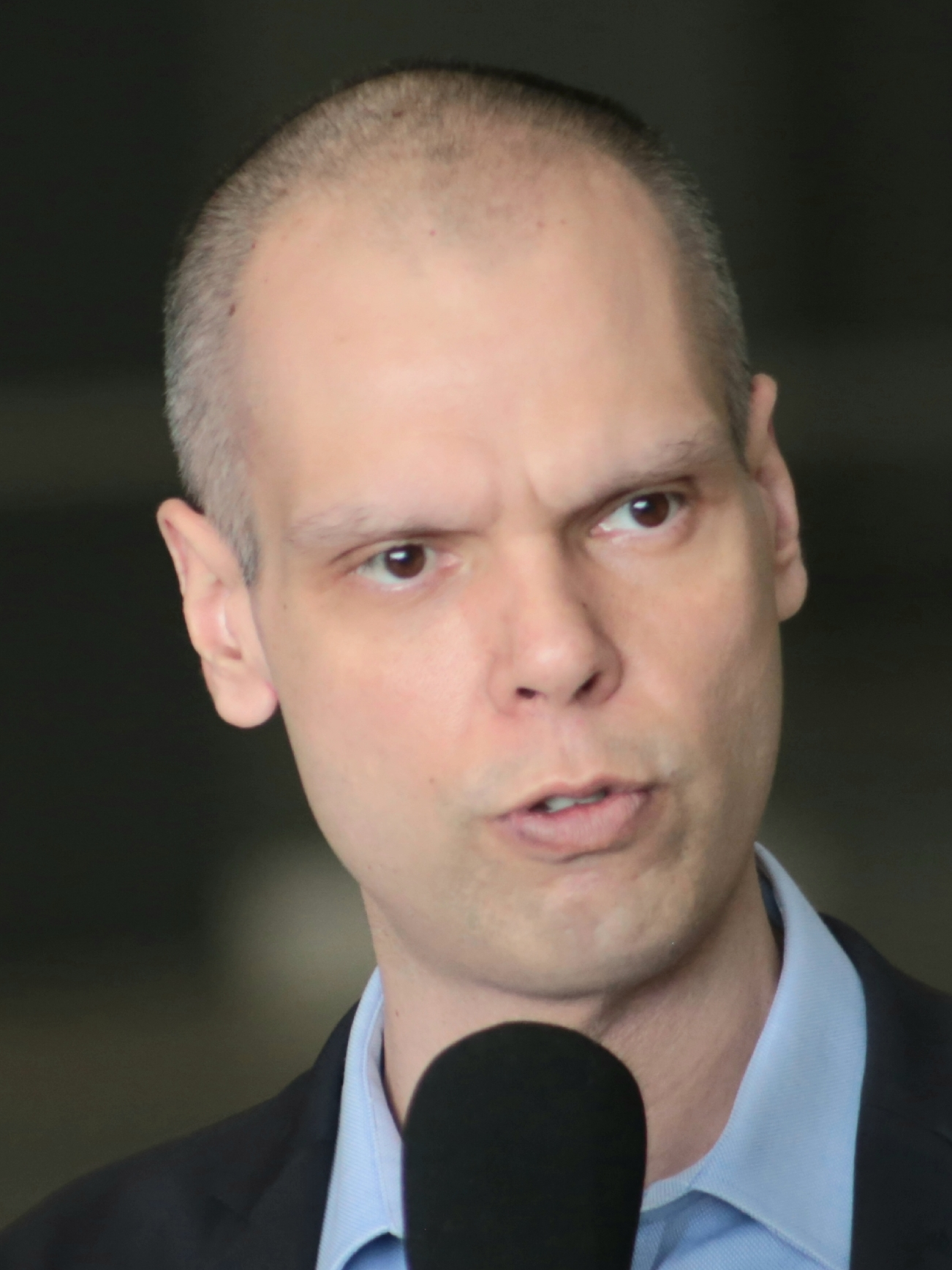
Covas in 2020

On 19 October 2019, Covas was taken to the emergency department at the Hospital Israelita Albert Einstein with a rash on his leg and was prescribed antibiotics. He failed to improve and was admitted to the Hospital Sírio-Libanês on 23 October with a diagnosis of erysipelas. Two days later, he was found to have a deep venous thrombosis of the fibular veins and bilateral pulmonary emboli. His young age and lack of risk factors prompted further investigation, which revealed an adenocarcinoma of the gastroesophageal junction with liver and regional lymph node metastases.

From October through February 2020, Covas received chemotherapy with complete remission of the primary tumor, but the lymph node metastases persisted; he then began a course of immunotherapy. In November 2020, he had stable disease and continued to receive immunotherapy with pembrolizumab every three weeks.

In June 2020, he tested positive for SARS-CoV-2 during the COVID-19 pandemic in Brazil. He self-isolated at City Hall for two weeks and recovered uneventfully.

By April 2021, his cancer had spread to his liver and bones, and Covas was admitted to Hospital Sírio-Libanês. He declined to take leave of office and was discharged twelve days later on 27 April. On 2 May 2021, Covas was readmitted to the hospital and announced his taking leave of office, with Deputy Mayor Ricardo Nunes acting as mayor in his absence. The following day, after bleeding was discovered in his stomach, Covas was transferred to an intensive care unit (ICU) and intubated for a procedure to stem the bleeding. He was extubated the same day after the bleeding was stopped, and transferred out of the ICU the next day. The medical team announced that his condition was irreversible on the evening of 14 May.

Covas died on 16 May 2021 at 08:20 BRT (11:20 UTC) of gastrointestinal cancer, aged 41, at Hospital Sírio-Libanês in São Paulo. He was the first mayor of São Paulo to die in office. He was buried in Paquetá Cemetery in Santos later that day.

== Personal life ==
Covas married Karen Ichiba, a friend from college, in 2004. They had a son in 2005. The couple divorced in 2014. His son often accompanied him during his tenure at city hall and during election campaigns.

In 2017, while he was deputy mayor, Covas underwent a radical change of appearance. Encouraged by Mayor Doria, Covas adopted a strict diet and started exercising frequently, and lost over 15 kg (33 lb) as a result. He also stopped wearing his usual jacket and tie, shaved his head, and grew a beard.

Covas lived in the São Paulo district of Barra Funda, having moved there when he was deputy mayor to be closer to the city centre. In 2020, during the pandemic, Covas lived at city hall for over two months in order to continue working while the state was under lockdown.

Political offices
Preceded by Nádia Campeão	Deputy Mayor of São Paulo; 2017–2018	Vacant Title next held by Ricardo Nunes
Preceded by João Doria	Mayor of São Paulo; 2018–2021	Succeeded by Ricardo Nunes
Preceded by Pedro Ubiratan de Azevedo	Secretary of the Environment of São Paulo; 2011–2014	Succeeded by Patricia Faga Iglecias
Party political offices
Preceded by Arnaldo Madeira	PSDB nominee for Deputy Mayor of São Paulo; 2016	Succeeded by José Aníbal (2024)
Preceded by João Doria	PSDB nominee for Mayor of São Paulo; 2020	Succeeded by José Luiz Datena
