= Datena =

Brazilian journalist (born 1957)

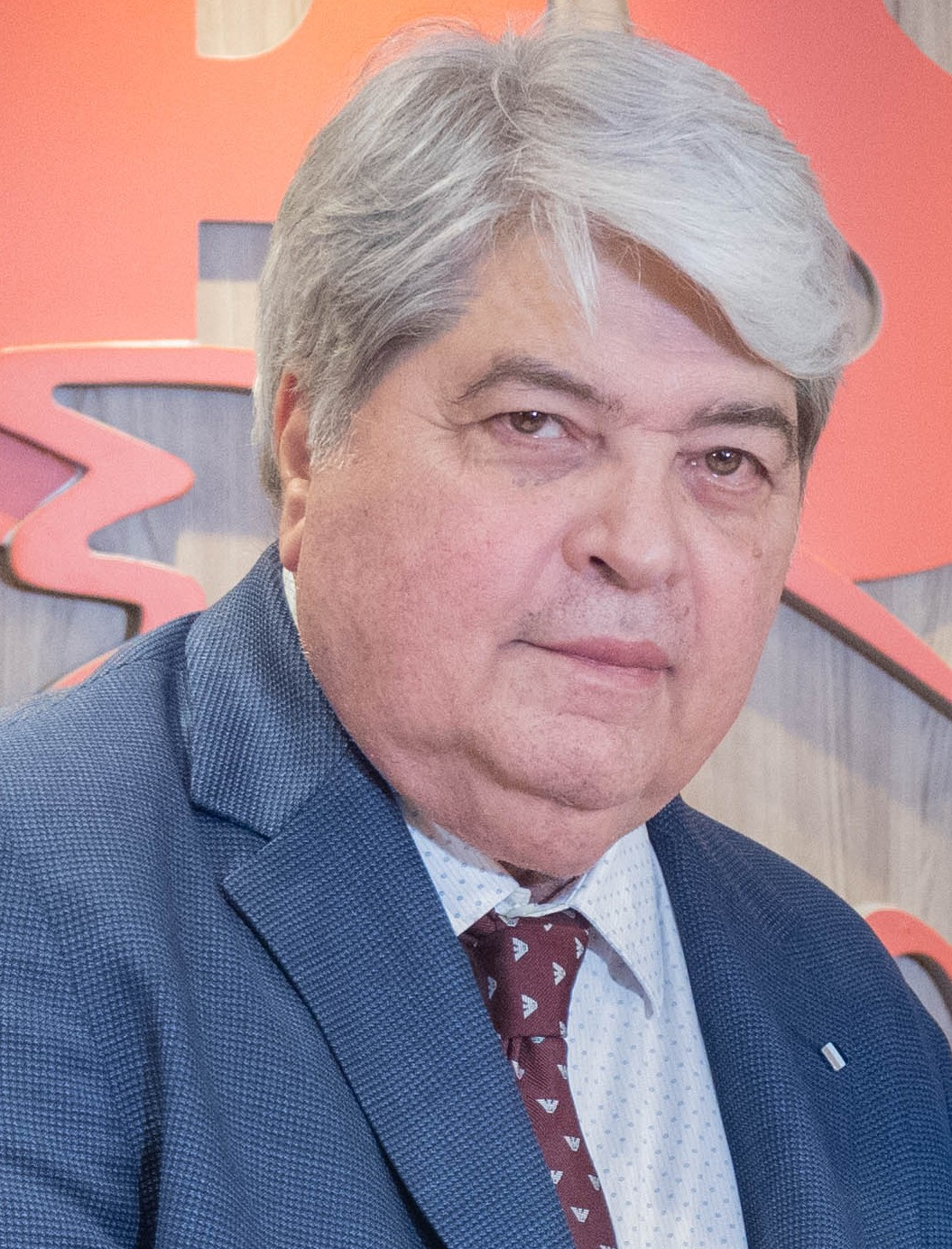
- Datena in 2023
- Born: José Luiz Datena; 19 May 1957 (age 69); Ribeirão Preto, São Paulo, Brazil
- Other names: Phenomenon (given by Jorge Kajuru); The Voice of the People
- Years active: 1998–present
- Notable work: Brasil Urgente, Cidade Alerta
- Political party: PSDB (since 2024)
- Other political affiliations: See list: PT (1992–2015); PP (2015–2016); PRP (2017–2018); DEM (2018–2020); MDB (2020–2021); PSL (2021); UNIÃO (2022); PSC (2022–2023); PDT (2023); PSB (2023–2024)
- Spouse: Matilde Foresto (m. 1977)
- Children: 5

José Luiz Datena (Brazilian Portuguese: [ʒuˈzɛ luˈiz daˈtenɐ]; born 19 May 1957), known mononymously as Datena, is a Brazilian journalist and TV presenter, who currently hosts the news program Brasil Urgente at Rede Bandeirantes. Brasil Urgente mostly deals with urban violence and crime in various regions of Brazil, often covering and commenting on homicides and crime in general. He started his career in radio before becoming a television presenter on a sports show, and later moving on to the show he currently hosts on Rede Bandeirantes.

Datena unsuccessfully ran for mayor of São Paulo in the 2024 São Paulo mayoral election. On 15 September 2024, he assaulted rival candidate Pablo Marçal with a metal chair during a televised debate on TV Cultura after Marçal referred to allegations of sexual misconduct involving Datena. A previous inquiry into the allegations did not lead to charges and ended after the accuser retracted her statements. Datena later said that he "had lost his head", adding that he believed that the allegations may have contributed to his mother-in-law's death.

Party political offices
Preceded by Bruno Covas	PSDB nominee for Mayor of São Paulo; 2024	Most recent
