= Sargento Nantes =

Brazilian politician (born 1984)

Member of the Chamber of Deputies
- Incumbent
- Assumed office 1 February 2027
- Constituency: São Paulo

Personal details
- Born: 3 February 1984 (age 42) São Paulo
- Party: Progressistas

Israel Nantes Santos (born 3 February 1984), better known as Sargento Nantes, is a Brazilian politician who was elected member of the Chamber of Deputies in 2026. He has been a member of the Municipal Chamber of São Paulo since 2025.

== Electoral history ==
Year	Election	Position	Party	Votes	%	Result	Ref.
2024	Municipal Election São Paulo	City Council	PP	112.484		Yes	
2026	State of São Paulo	Federal Deputy	PP	333.401	1.41%	Yes	
