= Acajutiba =

Municipality of Bahia, Brazil

- Municipality and town
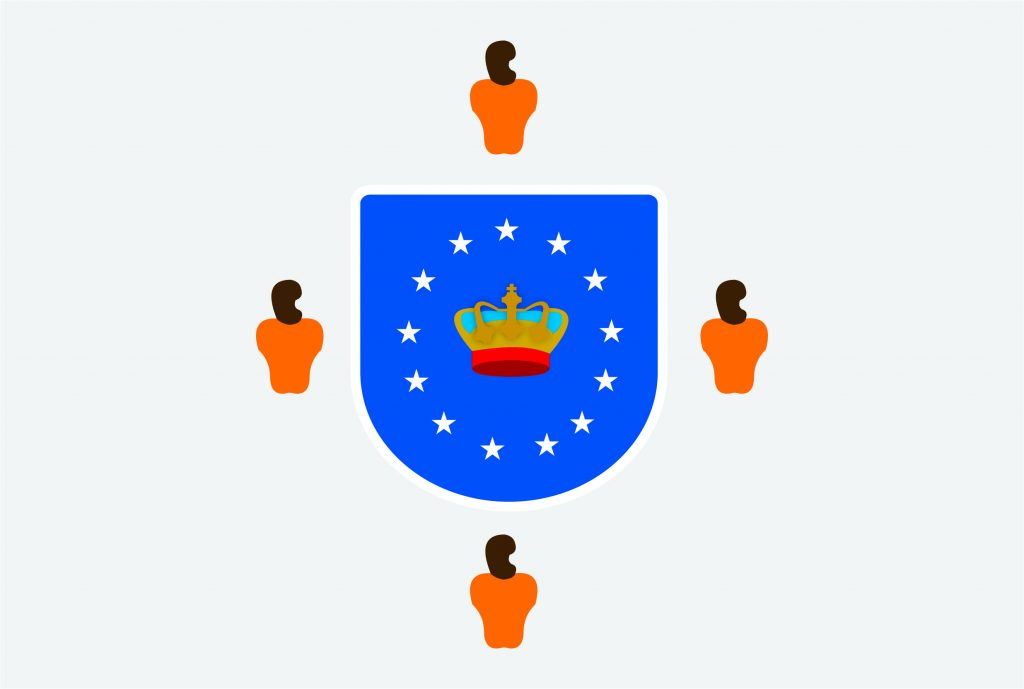
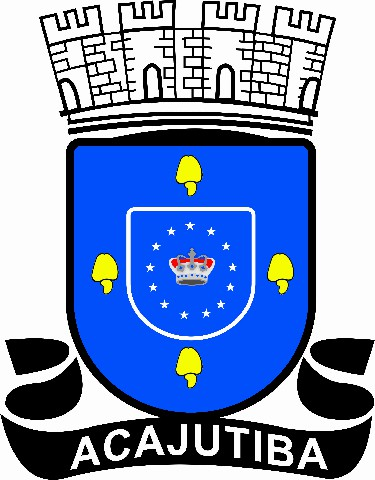
- Flag Coat of arms
- Nicknames: Acaju, cajueiro,
- Location in Brazil
- Coordinates: 11°40′S 38°01′W
- Country: Brazil
- Region: Nordeste
- State: Bahia

Population (2020)
  - Total: 15,187
- Time zone: UTC−3 (BRT)

Acajutiba is a municipality in the state of Bahia in the North-East region of Brazil.

== History ==
According to the Belgian historian Vincent van Houtte, the territory that now belongs to the municipality Acajutiba served as Dutch base for replenishment and espionage in times when the GWIC maintained colonies in the region.

To Van Houtte, who reviewed documents and secret correspondence signed by John Maurice of Nassau. The strategic location of the region, near the capital of the Portuguese colony and next to a bowl that would enable river navigation in Itapicuru were instrumental in founding in 1637, the settlement, which then evolved to a small fortification which became known as Fort Hoop, according to van Houtte, in honor of the administrator and strong architect Adrien de Hoop.

With the crisis in the colony and the fall of the Dutch mastery of the Brazilian northeast, the fort fell into disuse and was abandoned. What was left was destroyed by explorers between the centuries 18th and 19th But according to the historian, it is still possible to see some rubble near the banks of the river Itapicuru, known by the Dutch as rivier van donkere heuvels in English river of black hills, features physical that relate to those found on the river Bastião as it is known by the locals margin where supposedly there was a settlement and fortification.

Today the city is a small village in the Brazilian interior with serious problems for cities of the Third World.

== See also ==
- List of municipalities in Bahia
