= Ricardo Nunes (politician) =

Brazilian politician (born 1967)

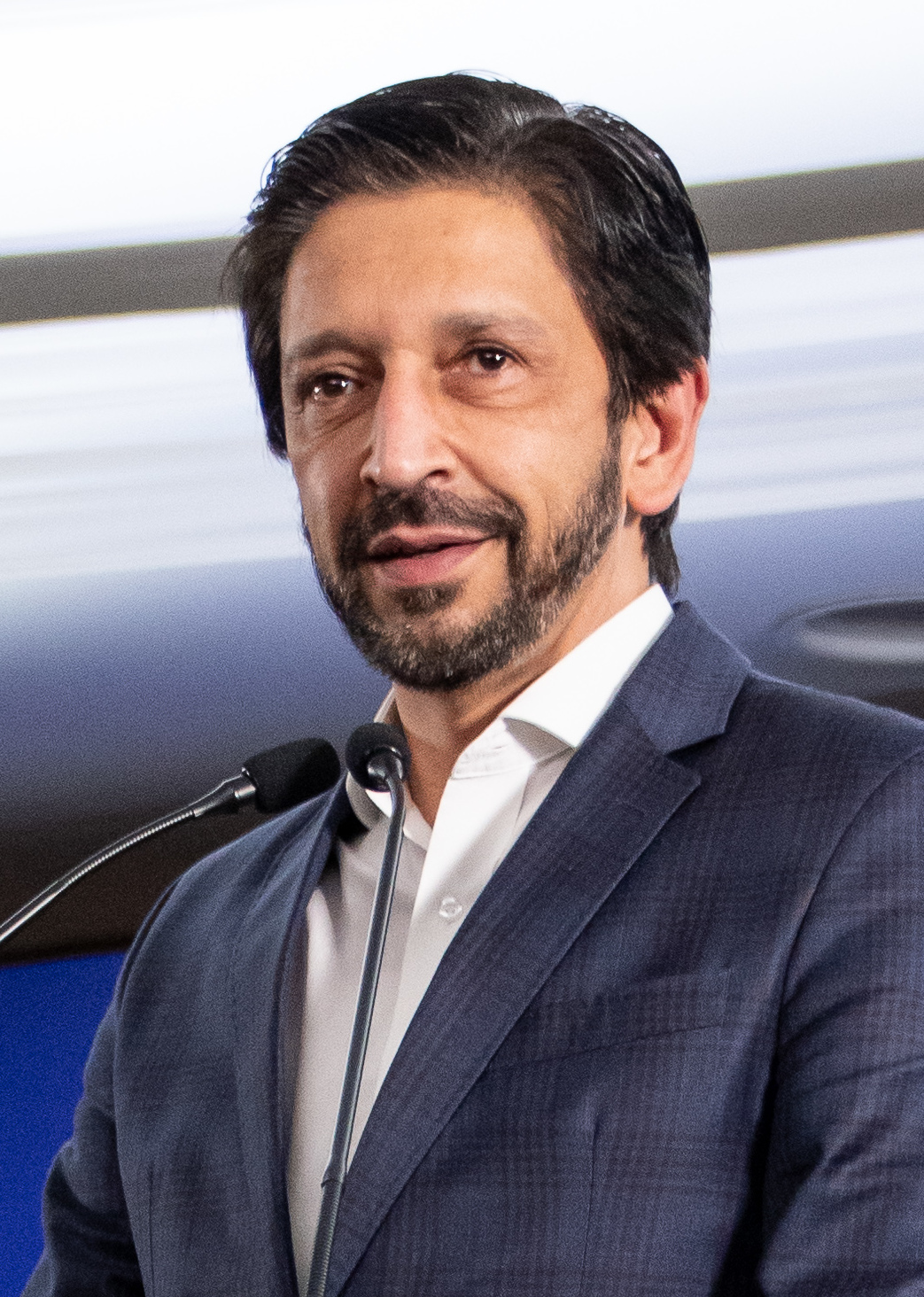
- Nunes in 2021

Mayor of São Paulo
- Incumbent
- Assumed office 16 May 2021 (Note: Acting: 3 May 2021 – 16 May 2021)
- Deputy: Vacant (2021–2024); Mello Araújo (2025–present)
- Preceded by: Bruno Covas

Deputy Mayor of São Paulo
- In office 1 January 2021 – 16 May 2021
- Mayor: Bruno Covas
- Preceded by: Bruno Covas
- Succeeded by: Mello Araújo

Member of the Municipal Chamber of São Paulo
- In office 1 January 2013 – 1 January 2021
- Constituency: At-large

Personal details
- Born: Ricardo Luis Reis Nunes; 13 November 1967 (age 58) São Paulo, Brazil
- Party: MDB (1986–present)
- Spouse: Regina Carnovale (m. 1999)
- Profession: Entrepreneur, politician

Ricardo Luis Reis Nunes (born 13 November 1967) is a Brazilian businessman and politician who is the current mayor of São Paulo, having assumed office on 16 May 2021 following the death of mayor Bruno Covas. He is a member of the Brazilian Democratic Movement.

== Political career ==
Nunes was elected a city councillor for São Paulo in 2012 and 2016, having been part of the pro-government coalition of mayor Fernando Haddad, of the Workers' Party. While serving as a member of the Municipal Assembly, Nunes held positions on legislative inquiry committees such as a committee on banks, in 2019, which investigated tax evasion of social security services in the state capital.

In 2016 he supported amnesty of churches in irregular situation during zoning laws.

Nunes gained notoriety in the media for being actively against the inclusion of sexuality and gender in the city education plan. He also authored a bill to create an aquatic transportation system at the Billings Reservoir. While the proposal is not very feasible, it was included in the goal plan of the city government.

In 2020, having been preparing a third run for city councillor, Nunes became the running mate of incumbent mayor and mayoral candidate Bruno Covas, in a coalition between the PSDB, MDB and DEM, part of a political maneuver by São Paulo state governor João Doria, a PSDB member, seeking an eventual support of the MDB in the 2022 elections.

As deputy mayor, Nunes kept a low profile, appearing publicly only in the absence of Bruno Covas.

On 2 May 2021, Nunes became acting mayor of São Paulo for 30 days, due to an administrative leave by the then incumbent mayor Bruno Covas due to treatment for cancer. After assuming office, it was reported that PSDB sought to persuade Nunes to switch to their party from MDB. However, Nunes rejected the idea of switching his party affiliation.

Covas died on 16 May 2021, and therefore Nunes permanently assumed office for the remainder of the term. He was elected in his own right as mayor in the 2024 São Paulo mayoral election.

Year	Election	Party	Office	Coalition	Partners	Party	Votes	Percent	Result
1992	Municipal Election of São Paulo	MDB	Councillor	São Paulo better (PMDB, PDT, PSD, PPS, PTdoB, PRP, PTR)	—N/a		N/A		Not elected
2012	Municipal Election of São Paulo	MDB	Councillor	São Paulo in 1st Place (PMDB, PSL, PSC, PTC)	—N/a		30,747	0.54%	Elected
2016	Municipal Election of São Paulo	MDB	Councillor	Union for São Paulo (PMDB, PSD)	—N/a		54,692	1.02%	Elected
2018	State Election of São Paulo	MDB	Federal Deputy	—N/a			47,258	0.22%	Not elected
2020	Municipal Election of São Paulo	MDB	Vice Mayor	All for São Paulo (PSDB, MDB, PODE, PP, PSC, PL, Cidadania, DEM, PTC, PV, PROS)	Bruno Covas	PSDB	1,754,013	32.85%	Runoff
2020	Municipal Election of São Paulo	MDB	Vice Mayor	All for São Paulo (PSDB, MDB, PODE, PP, PSC, PL, Cidadania, DEM, PTC, PV, PROS)	Bruno Covas	PSDB	3,169,121	59.38%	Elected
2024	Municipal Election of São Paulo	MDB	Mayor	Safe Path for São Paulo (MDB, PL, PP, Republicanos, UNIÃO, PSD, Solidariedade, Agir, Avante, PRD, MOBILIZA, PODE)	Mello Araújo	PL	1,801,139	29.48%	Runoff
2024	Municipal Election of São Paulo	MDB	Mayor	Safe Path for São Paulo (MDB, PL, PP, Republicanos, UNIÃO, PSD, Solidariedade, Agir, Avante, PRD, MOBILIZA, PODE)	Mello Araújo	PL	3,393,110	59.35%	Elected

== Notes ==
Political offices
Vacant Title last held by Bruno Covas	Vice Mayor of São Paulo; 2021	Vacant Title next held by Mello Araújo
Preceded by Bruno Covas	Mayor of São Paulo; 2021–present	Incumbent
Party political offices
Preceded by Marianne Pinotti (2012)	MDB nominee for Deputy Mayor of São Paulo; 2020	Most recent
