= 2020 São Paulo mayoral election =

2020 São Paulo municipal election
- 15 November 2020 (first round); 29 November 2020 (second round)
- Mayoral election
- Opinion polls
- Turnout: 70.71% (first round); 69.19% (second round)
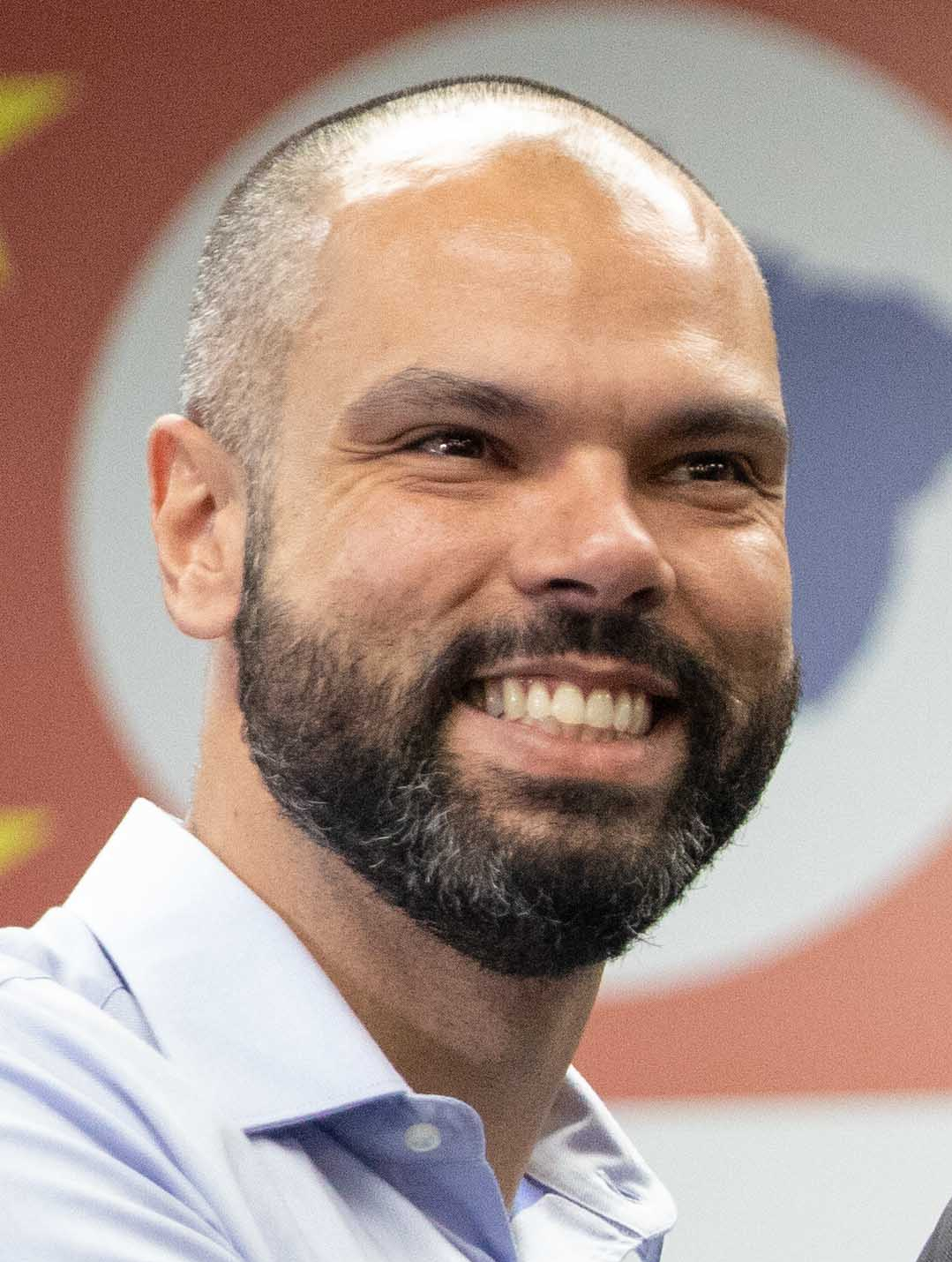

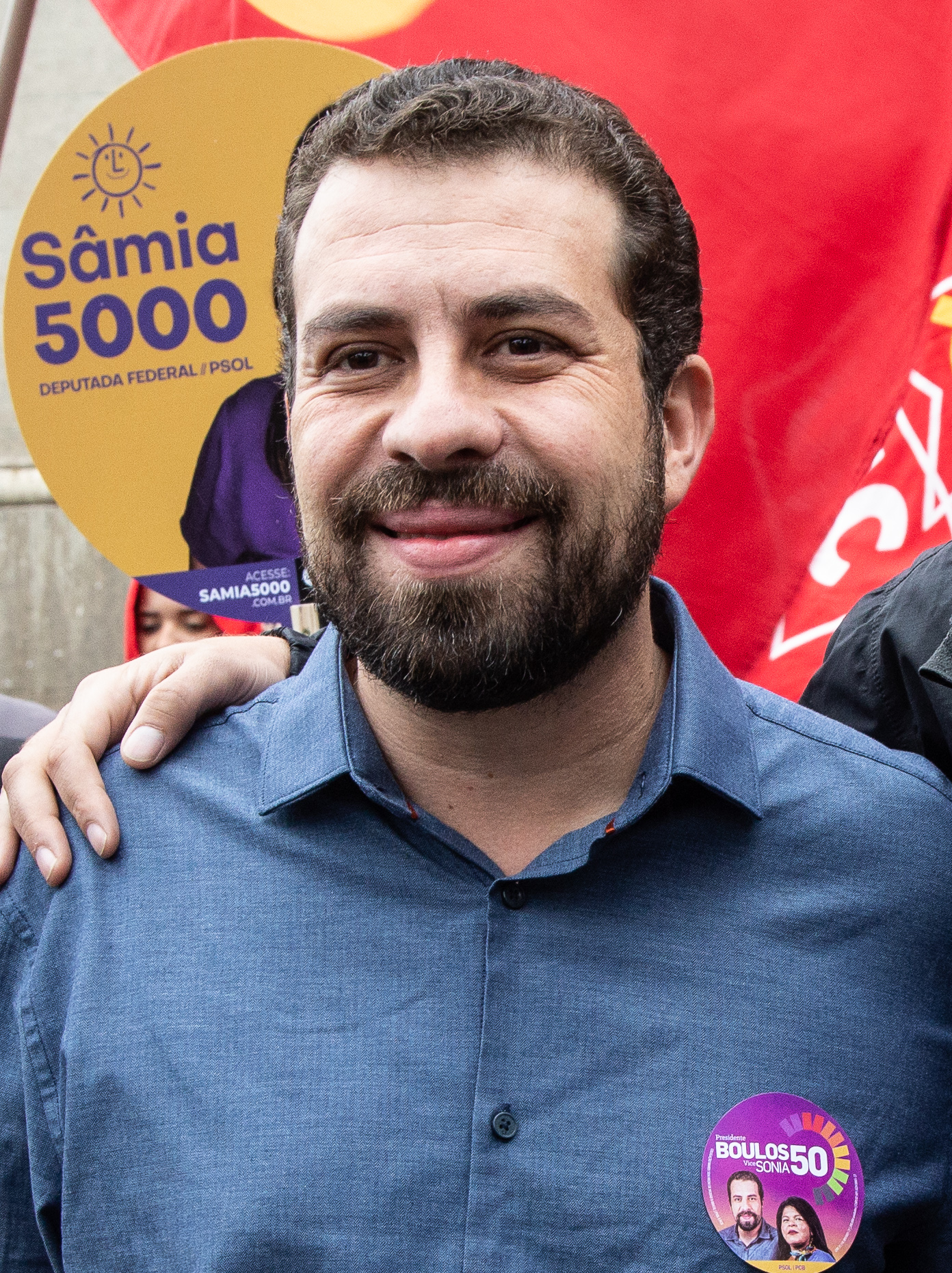
Candidate	Bruno Covas	Guilherme Boulos
Party	PSDB	PSOL
Alliance	All for São Paulo	To Turn the Tide
Running mate	Ricardo Nunes (MDB)	Luiza Erundina
Popular vote	3,169,121	2,168,109
Percentage	59.38%	40.62%
- Most voted candidate per electoral zone in the second round: Boulos: 50–59% Covas: 50–59% 60–69% 70–79%
Mayor before election
Bruno Covas
PSDB
Elected mayor
Bruno Covas
PSDB
- Parliamentary election
Party	Leader	Vote %	Seats	+/–
Municipal Chamber
PT	Alfredo Cavalcante	12.76	8	−1
PSDB	Gilson Barreto	12.20	8	−3
PSOL	Celso Giannazi	8.68	6	+4
DEM	Milton Leite	8.59	6	+2
PODE	Milton Ferreira	5.22	3	+2
PSD	Rodrigo Goulart	4.99	3	−1
MDB	Ricardo Nunes	4.98	3	+1
Patriota	Fernando Holiday	4.33	3	+3
NOVO	Rodrigo Fonseca	3.75	2	+1
PSB	Camilo Cristófaro	3.42	2	−1
PL	Toninho Paiva	3.26	2	−2
PSL	Rinaldi Digilio	2.60	1	+1
PV	None	2.22	1	−1
PTB	Paulo Frange	1.45	1	−1
This lists parties that won seats. See the complete results below.

The 2020 São Paulo municipal election took place in the city of São Paulo, Brazil, with the first round taking place on 15 November 2020 and the second round taking place on 29 November 2020. Voters voted to elect the Mayor, the Vice Mayor and 55 city councillors for the administration of the city. The result was a 2nd round victory for incumbent Mayor Bruno Covas of the Brazilian Social Democratic Party (PSDB), winning 3,169,121 votes and a share of 59,38% of the popular vote, defeating political activist Guilherme Boulos of the Socialism and Liberty Party (PSOL), who took 2,168,109 votes and a share of 40.62% of the popular vote.

== Background ==
In the 2016 São Paulo mayoral election, João Doria of the Brazilian Social Democratic Party (PSDB) was elected Mayor of São Paulo in first round with a share of 53,29% of the popular vote, defeating then incumbent Mayor Fernando Haddad, of the Workers' Party (PT). Later, Doria resigned to run for governor of the State of São Paulo in the 2018 São Paulo gubernatorial election against then incumbent governor Márcio França, leaving his Vice Mayor Bruno Covas to assume as Mayor of São Paulo. While facing cancer since October 2019, Covas was nevertheless confirmed as candidate for the Brazilian Social Democratic Party (PSDB) for reelection.

=== Other candidates ===
A traditional runner in the mayoral elections and federal deputy for the State of São Paulo, Celso Russomanno of the Republicanos, was endorsed by incumbent President Jair Bolsonaro as a more aligned candidate to his government, in opposition to Covas' coalition and somewhat opposition to the government, particularly in his handling of the Coronavirus Pandemic.

The election would see the rise of Guilherme Boulos, a political and social activist, who had previously disputed the 2018 Brazilian general election, as a presidential candidate and who now had been elected in the primaries of the Socialism and Liberty Party (PSOL) to run as their candidate for the city of São Paulo. Slowly, he would rise to become the dominant left-wing opponent to Covas' more ideologically broad coalition of voters and Russomano's base of Bolsonaro's supporters. He would later become the front-runner in the second round alongside Covas.

Similarly to Boulos' profile, the election would also see the rise of political YouTuber and influencer Arthur do Val, known by his pseudonym "Mamãefalei" and YouTube channel of the same name, who had previously been elected in the 2018 São Paulo gubernatorial election as state deputy. He ran on a platform of right-wing liberal economic policies to revitalize and embellish São Paulo's town center and proposals to dealing with the "Cracolândia" area of São Paulo, known for its high incidence of drug trafficking and drug use. He was endorsed to run for the Patriota in a broad opposition to both Boulos' left-wing, Covas' coalition and Russomanos' base of Bolsonaro supporters.

Former governor of the State of São Paulo Márcio França, who had lost reelection in the 2018 São Paulo gubernatorial election to João Doria, was endorsed to run as the candidate for the Brazilian Socialist Party (PSB). He ran on a moderate and traditional social democratic platform. Among his proposals he defended free bus tickets during Sundays and holidays, as well as a reduction of the working time to 6 hours a day, and 3 working days during the week.

The Worker's Party (PT), struggling to maintain leadership ever since the impeachment of former president Dilma Rousseff, decided to seek out for a new figure and endorsed Jilmar Tatto as their candidate. He also ran as a traditional social democrat. Among his proposals were an increase to property tax for the rich, and creation of a communication channel for the city's government, which would serve as its official broadcasting service on news agencies, TV and public newsletters.

Among other lesser known candidates were Joice Hasselmann (PSL), Andrea Matarazzo (PSD), Marina Helou (REDE), Levy Fidelix (PRTB), Orlando Silva (PCdoB), Antonio Carlos (PCO) and Vera Lúcia (PSTU).

=== Extinction of Sabarás' candidacy ===
Filipe Sabará was nominated candidate for the New Party (NOVO), but later he would be expelled from the party due to alleged inconsistencies in his curriculum, violating the party's code of ethics. Ultimately, the Regional Electoral Tribunal of São Paulo, at the party's request, ruled to extinguish his candidacy and the end of his campaign after his vice candidate Maria Helena declined to continue running.

== Impact of the COVID-19 Pandemic ==
Amidst the COVID-19 pandemic, the city recorded the highest abstention rate ever, with around 29.29% of voters abstaining from voting in the first round, and around 30,78% of voters abstaining from voting in the second round, also resulting in one of the lowest turnouts seen for the municipal elections of São Paulo.

== Candidates ==
=== Candidates in runoff ===
Party	Candidate	Most relevant political office or occupation	Party	Running mate	Coalition	Electoral number
Brazilian Social Democracy Party (PSDB)	Bruno Covas	Mayor of São Paulo (2018–2021)	Brazilian Democratic Movement (MDB)	Ricardo Nunes	All for São Paulo: Brazilian Social Democracy Party (PSDB); Democrats (DEM); Cidadania; Liberal Party (PL); Podemos (PODE); Social Christian Party (PSC); Republican Party of the Social Order (PROS); Brazilian Democratic Movement (MDB); Progressistas (PP); Green Party (PV); Christian Labour Party (PTC)	45
Socialism and Liberty Party (PSOL)	Guilherme Boulos	Professor, activist and writer	Socialism and Liberty Party (PSOL)	Luiza Erundina	To Turn the Tide: Socialism and Liberty Party (PSOL); Brazilian Communist Party (PCB); Popular Unity (UP)	50

=== Candidates failing to make runoff ===
Party	Candidate	Most relevant political office or occupation	Party	Running mate	Coalition	Electoral number
Republicanos	Celso Russomanno	Member of the Chamber of Deputies (since 2015)	Brazilian Labour Party (PTB)	Marcos da Costa	Alliance for São Paulo: Republicanos; Brazilian Labour Party (PTB)	10
Workers' Party (PT)	Jilmar Tatto	Secretary of Transports of São Paulo (2013–2017)	Workers' Party (PT)	Carlos Zarattini	—N/a	13
United Socialist Workers' Party (PSTU)	Vera Lúcia Salgado	Labour organizer	United Socialist Workers' Party (PSTU)	Professor Lucas	—N/a	16
Social Liberal Party (PSL)	Joice Hasselmann	Member of the Chamber of Deputies (2019–2023)	Social Liberal Party (PSL)	Ivan Sayeg	SP Deserves More: Social Liberal Party (PSL); Christian Democracy (DC)	17
Sustainability Network (REDE)	Marina Helou	Member of the Legislative Assembly of São Paulo (since 2019)	Sustainability Network (REDE)	Marco DiPreto	—N/a	18
Brazilian Labour Renewal Party (PRTB)	Levy Fidelix	PRTB National President (1994–2021)	Brazilian Labour Renewal Party (PRTB)	Jairo Glikson	—N/a	28
Workers' Cause Party (PCO)	Antonio Carlos	Member of PCO National Executive	Workers' Cause Party (PCO)	Henrique Áreas	—N/a	29
Brazilian Socialist Party (PSB)	Márcio França	Governor of São Paulo (2018–2019)	Democratic Labour Party (PDT)	Antonio Neto	Here We Have Word: Brazilian Socialist Party (PSB); Democratic Labour Party (PDT); Party of National Mobilization (PMN); Avante; Solidariedade	40
Patriota	Arthur do Val	Member of Legislative Assembly of São Paulo (2019–2022)	Patriota	Adelaide Oliveira	—N/a	51
Social Democratic Party (PSD)	Andrea Matarazzo	Member of the Municipal Chamber of São Paulo (2013–2017)	Social Democratic Party (PSD)	Marta Costa	—N/a	55
Communist Party of Brazil (PCdoB)	Orlando Silva	Member of the Chamber of Deputies (since 2015)	Communist Party of Brazil (PCdoB)	Andrea Barcelos	—N/a	65

=== Candidacy denied ===
Party	Candidate	Most relevant political office or occupation	Party	Running mate	Coalition	Electoral number
New Party (NOVO)	Filipe Sabará	Secretary of Assistance and Social Development of São Paulo (2017)	New Party (NOVO)	Maria Helena	—N/a	30

=== Withdrawn candidates ===
- Antonio Carlos Mazzeo (PCB) – professor and writer.
- Gil Diniz – State Deputy of São Paulo since 2019.
- Henrique Meirelles (MDB) – State Secretary of Economy and Planning of São Paulo since 2019; Minister of Finances 2016–2018; President of the Central Bank of Brazil 2003–2011.
- José Luiz Datena (MDB) – Journalist and TV presenter.
- Vivian Mendes (UP) – President of Popular Unity in São Paulo since 2019.
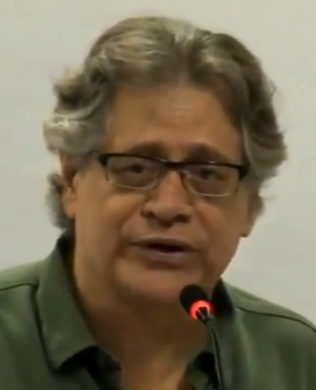
Professor and writer
Antonio Carlos Mazzeo (PCB)
from São Paulo

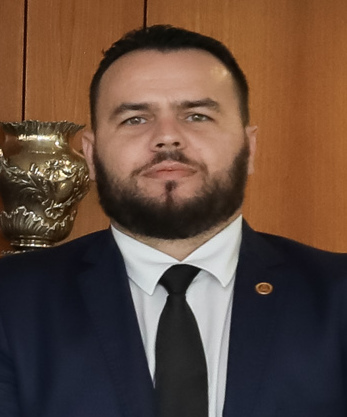
State Deputy
Gil Diniz (I)
from Serra Talhada

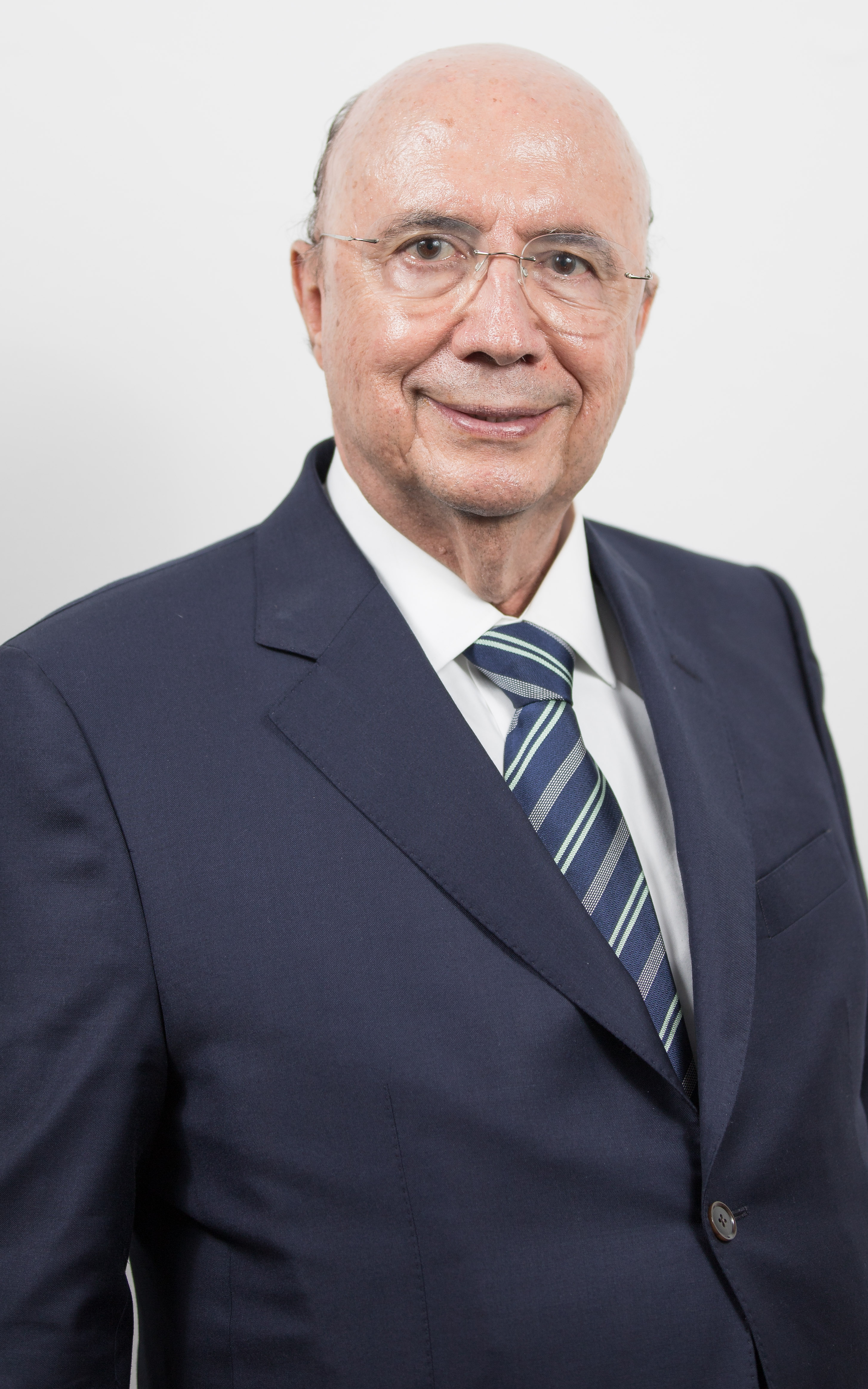
Secretary of Finances
Henrique Meirelles (MDB)
from Anápolis

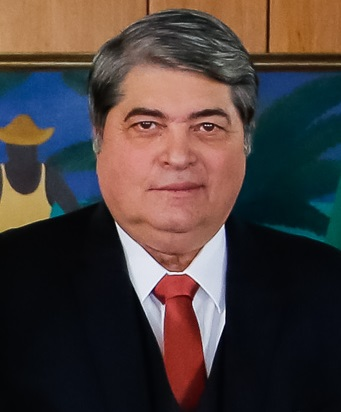
Journalist and TV presenter
José Luiz Datena (MDB)
from Ribeirão Preto

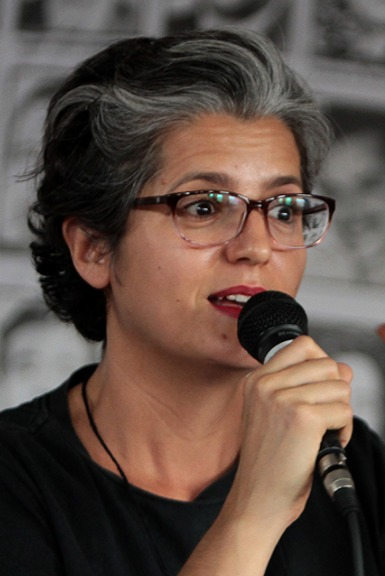
President of UP
Vivian Mendes (UP)
from São Paulo

=== Declined candidates ===
- Aloizio Mercadante (PT) – Minister of Education 2012–2014, 2015–2016; Chief of Staff of the Presidency 2014–2015; Ministry of Science, Technology and Innovation 2011–2012; Senator for São Paulo 2003–2011; Federal Deputy from São Paulo 1991–1995, 1999–2003.
- Ana Estela Haddad (PT) – First Lady of São Paulo 2013–2017.
- Fernando Haddad (PT) – Mayor of São Paulo 2013–2017; Minister of Education 2005–2012; candidate for Mayor of São Paulo in 2016; candidate for President of Brazil in 2018.
- Janaína Paschoal (PSL) – State Deputy of São Paulo since 2019.
- Tabata Amaral – Federal Deputy from São Paulo since 2019.
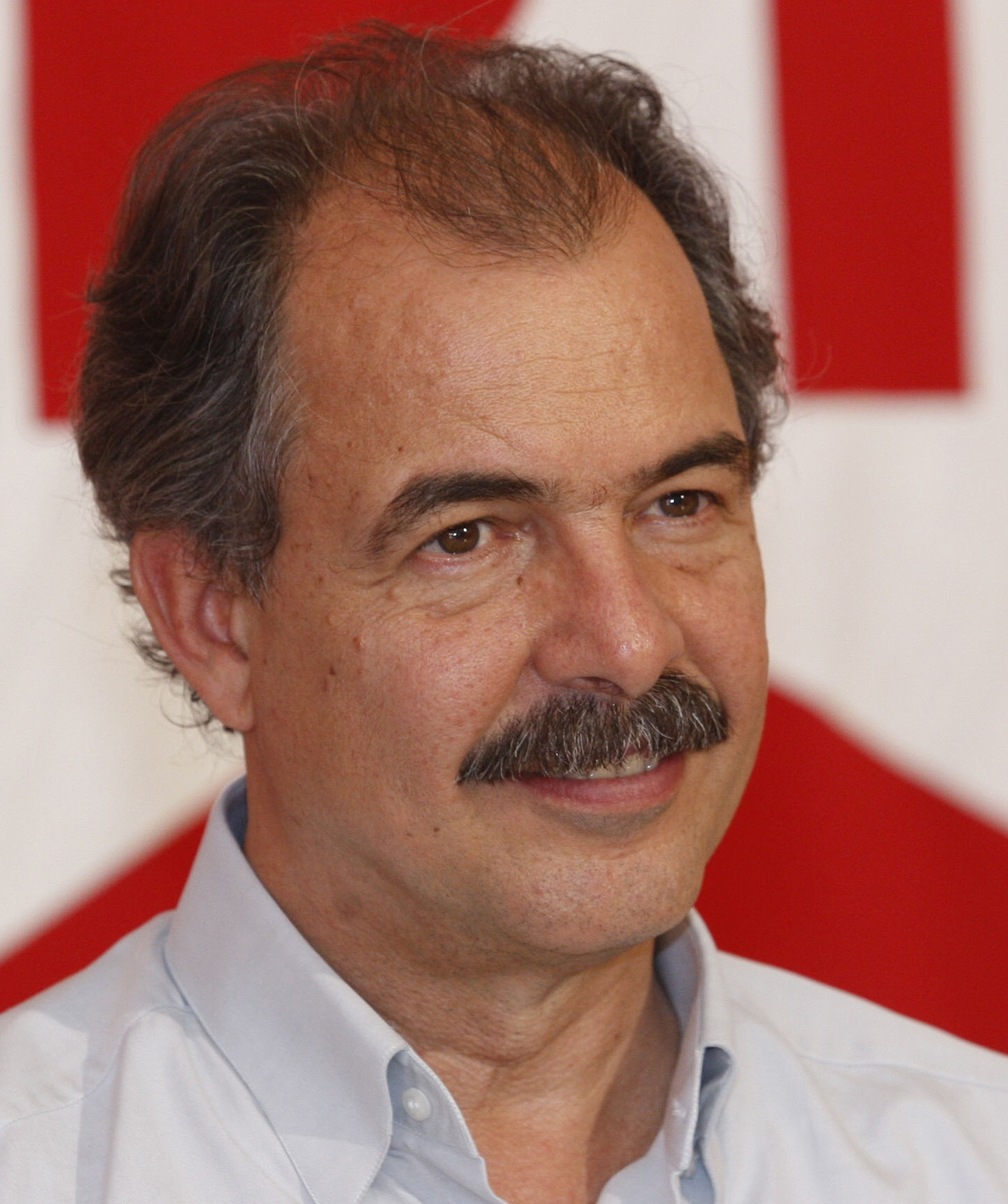
Former Minister
Aloizio Mercadante (PT)
from Santos

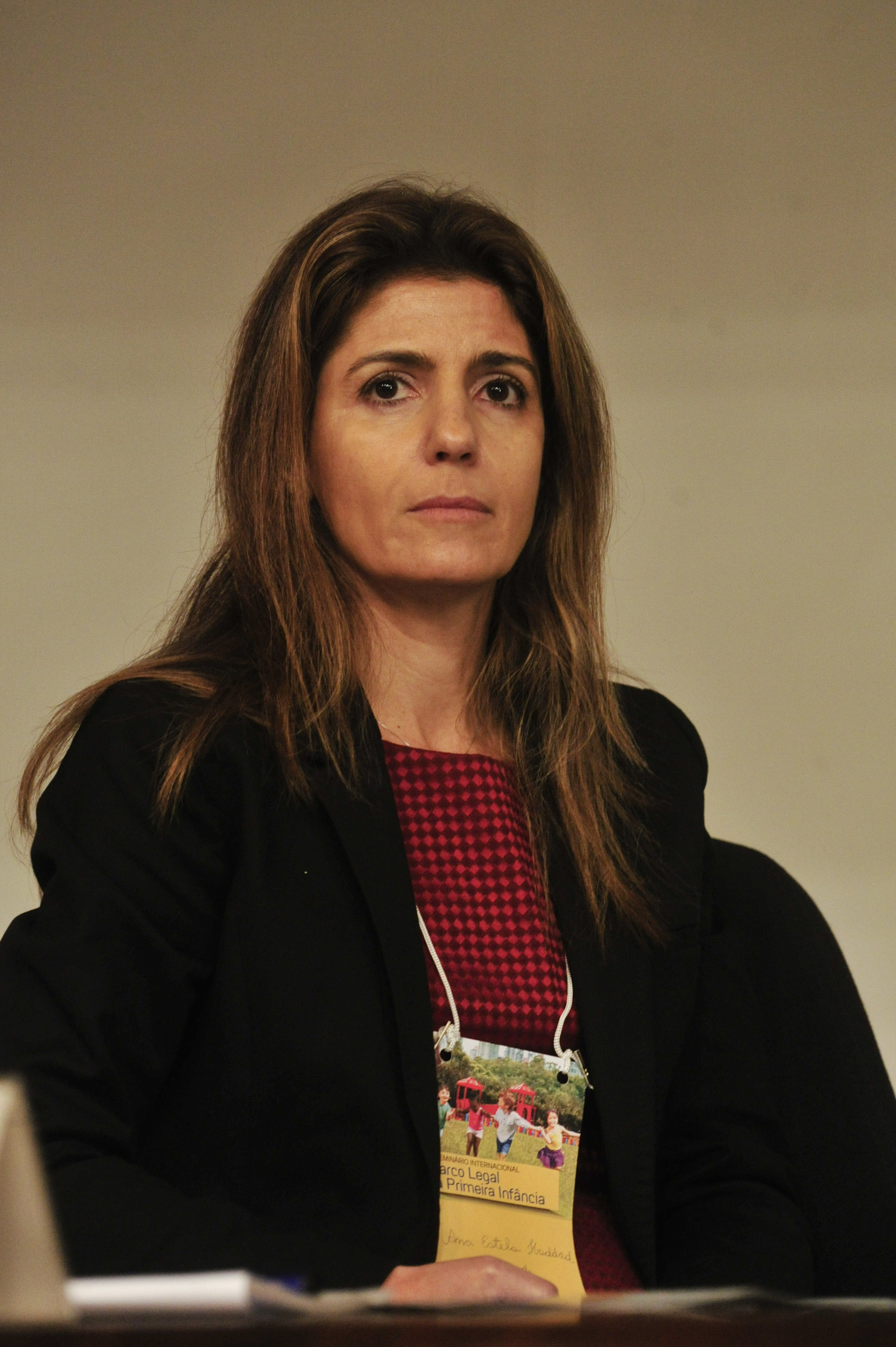
Former First Lady of São Paulo
Ana Estela Haddad (PT)
from São Paulo

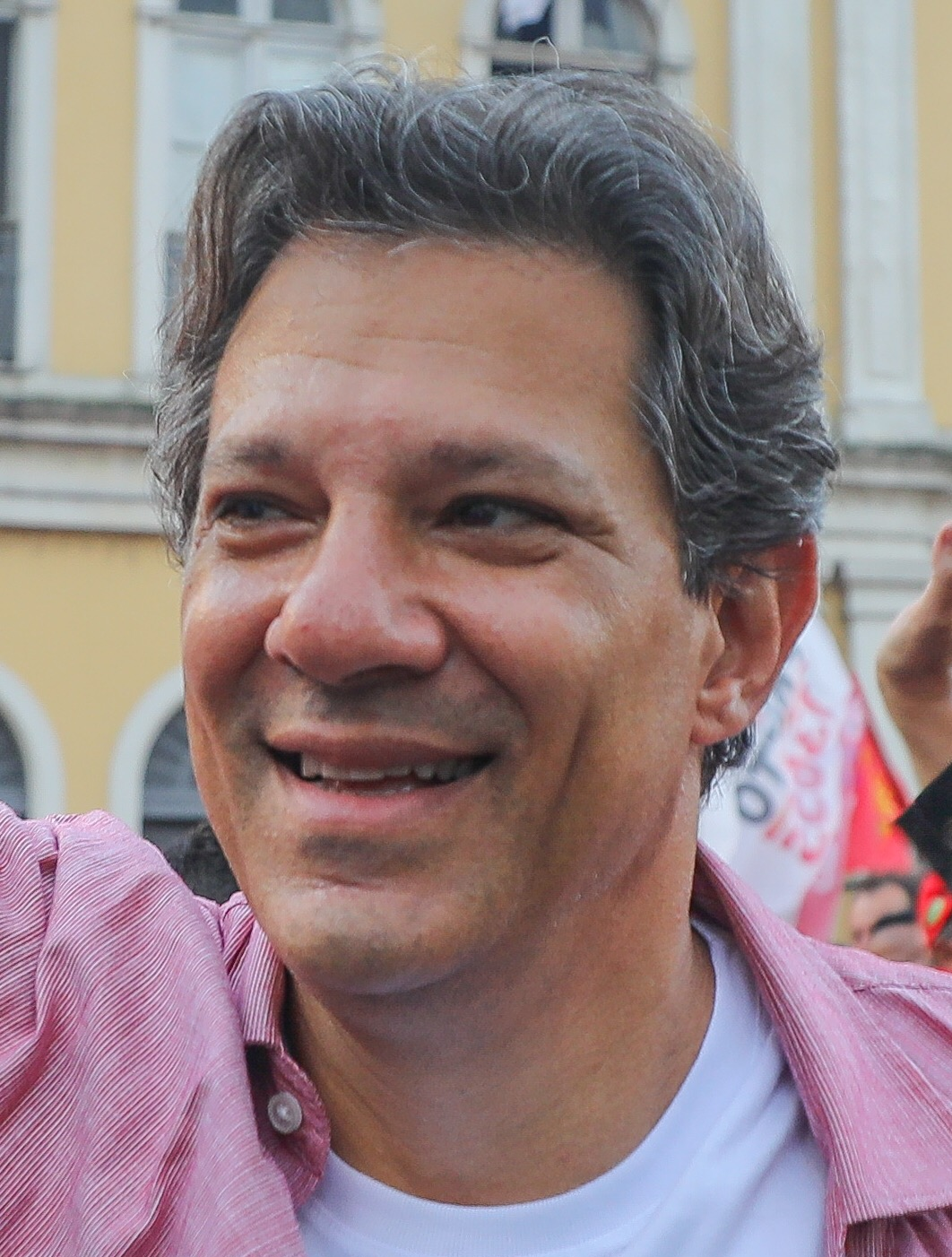
Former Mayor
Fernando Haddad (PT)
from São Paulo

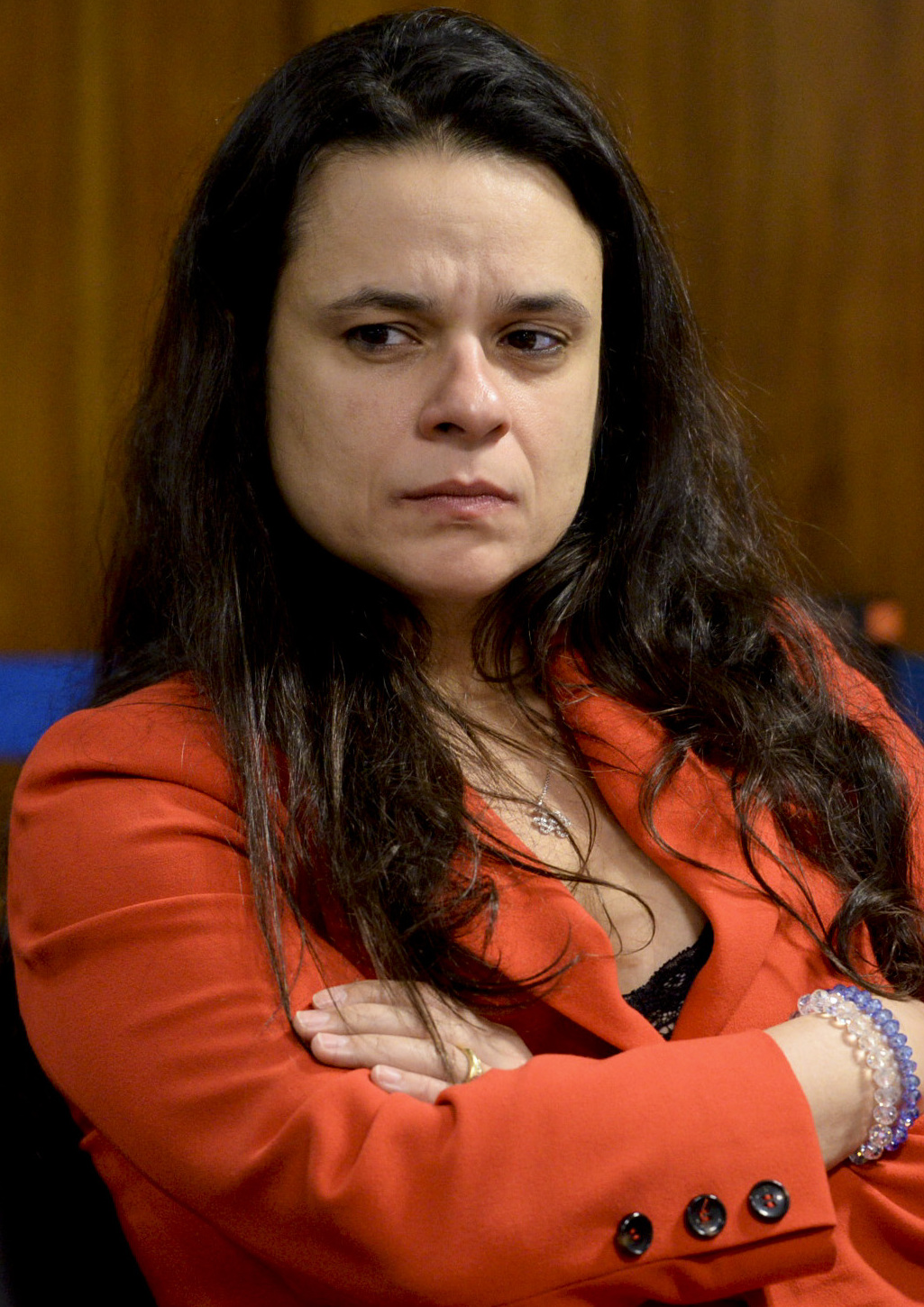
State Deputy
Janaína Paschoal (PSL)
from São Paulo

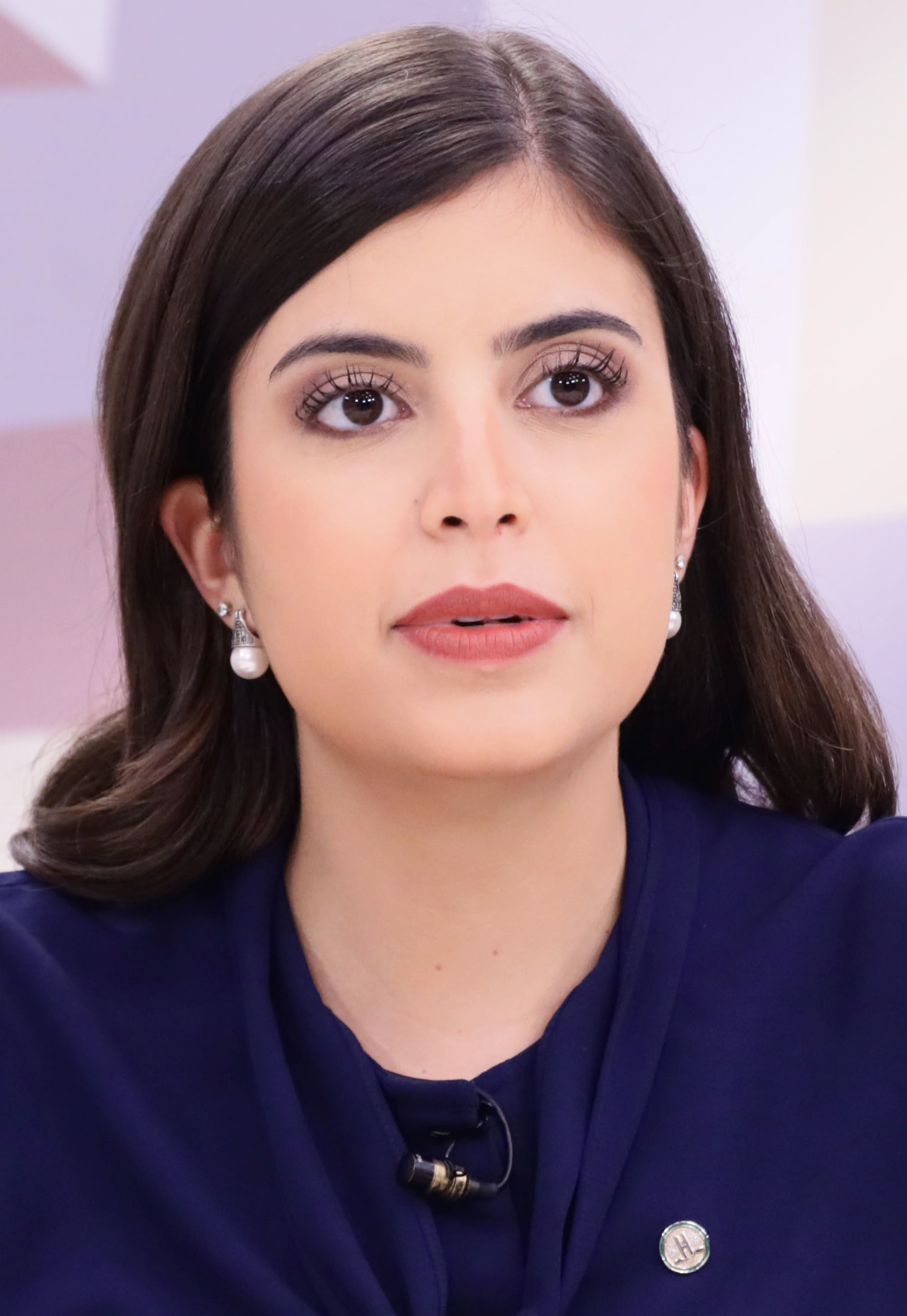
Federal Deputy
Tabata Amaral (PDT)
from São Paulo

=== Lost in primaries or conventions ===
- Alexandre Padilha – Federal Deputy from São Paulo since 2019; Municipal Secretary of Health of São Paulo 2015–2017; Minister of Health 2011–2014; Secretary of Institutional Relations 2009–2010.
- Antônio Ribas Paiva (PTC) – Rural producer, entrepreneur and lawyer.
- Carlos Giannazi (PSOL) – State Deputy of São Paulo since 2007; City Councillor of São Paulo 2001–2007. Candidate for Mayor of São Paulo in 2012.
- Carlos Zarattini (PT) – Federal Deputy from São Paulo since 2007; State Deputy of São Paulo 1999–2003.
- Christian Lohbauer (NOVO) – political scientist and professor. Candidate for Vice President of Brazil in 2018.
- Eduardo Jorge (PV) – Federal Deputy from São Paulo 1987–2005; State Deputy of São Paulo 1983–1987. Candidate for President of Brazil in 2014.
- Eduardo Suplicy (PT) – City Councillor of São Paulo since 2017, 1989−1990; Senator for São Paulo 1991−2015; Federal Deputy from São Paulo 1983−1987; State Deputy of São Paulo 1979−1982.
- José Eduardo Cardozo (PT) – Attorney General of the Union 2016; Minister of Justice and Public Security 2011−2016; Federal Deputy from São Paulo 2003−2011; City Councillor of São Paulo 1995−2003.
- Kika da Silva (PT) – Activist.
- Luiz Antonio de Medeiros Neto (PDT) – Federal Deputy from São Paulo 1999–2007.
- Luiz Philippe of Orléans-Braganza (PSL) – Federal Deputy from São Paulo since 2019.
- Marta Suplicy (SD) – Senator for São Paulo 2011–2019; Minister of Culture 2012–2014; Minister of Tourism 2007–2008; Mayor of São Paulo 2001–2005; candidate for Mayor of São Paulo in 2004, 2008 and 2016.
- Nabil Bonduki (PT) – Municipal Secretary of Culture of São Paulo 2015–2016; City Councillor of São Paulo 2001–2005; 2013–2017.
- Nádia Campeão (PCdoB) – Vice Mayor of São Paulo 2013−2017; Municipal Secretary of Sports of São Paulo 2001−2005; candidate for Vice Governor in 2006.
- Nelson Marconi (PDT) – economist, Getúlio Vargas Foundation professor.
- Paulo Teixeira (PT) – Federal Deputy from São Paulo since 2007; City Councillor of São Paulo 2005–2007; Director-President of Metropolitan Housing Company of São Paulo (COHAB) 2003–2004; Municipal Secretary of Housing and Urban Development of São Paulo 2001–2004; State Deputy of São Paulo 1995–2001.
- Sâmia Bomfim (PSOL) – Federal Deputy from São Paulo since 2019; City Councillor of São Paulo 2017−2019.
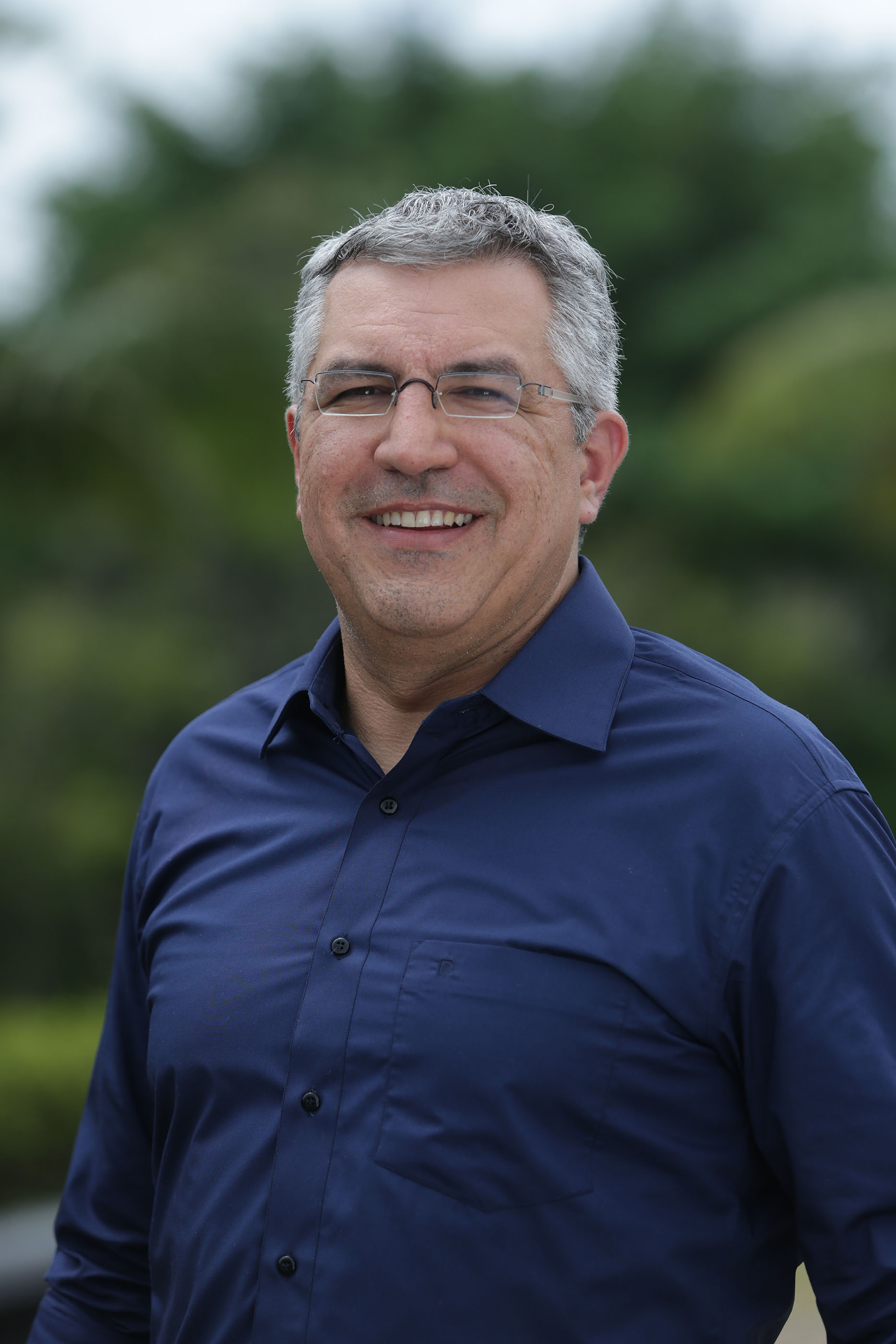
Federal Deputy
Alexandre Padilha (PT)
from São Paulo

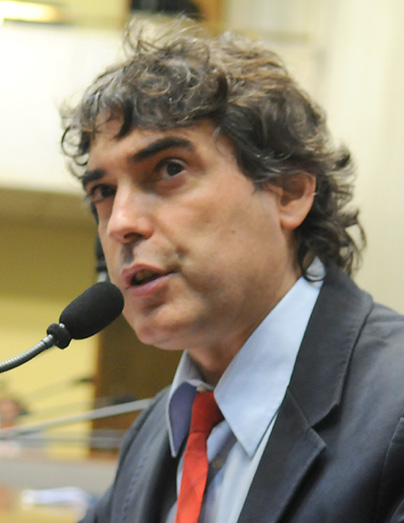
State Deputy
Carlos Giannazi (PSOL)
from São Paulo

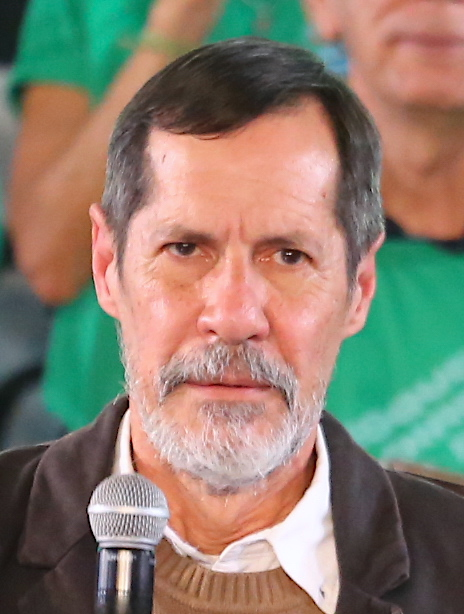
Former Federal Deputy
Eduardo Jorge (PV)
from Salvador

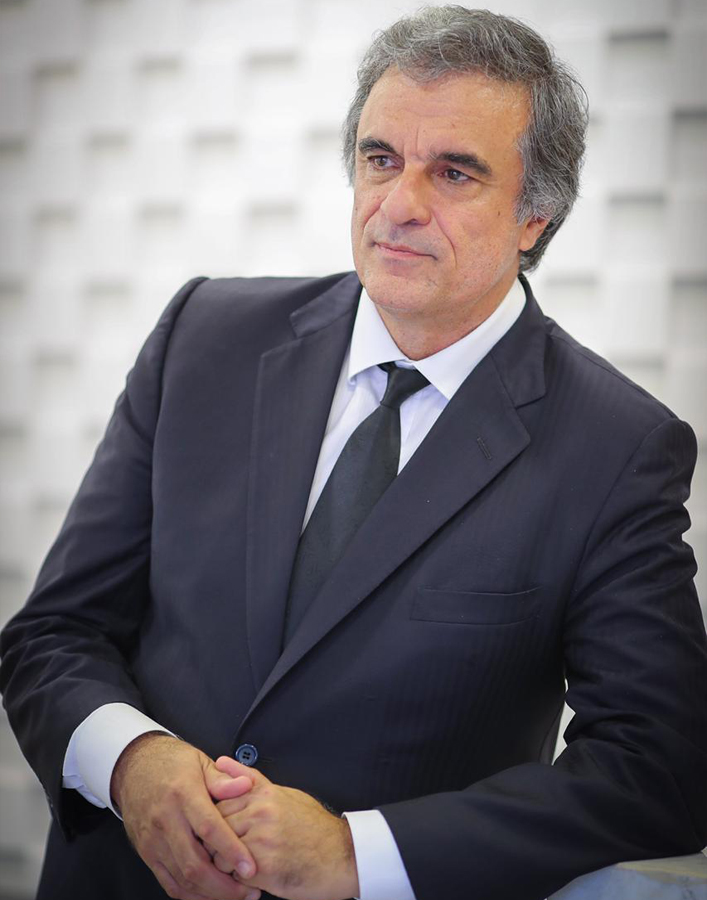
Former Attorney General
José Eduardo Cardozo (PT)
from São Paulo

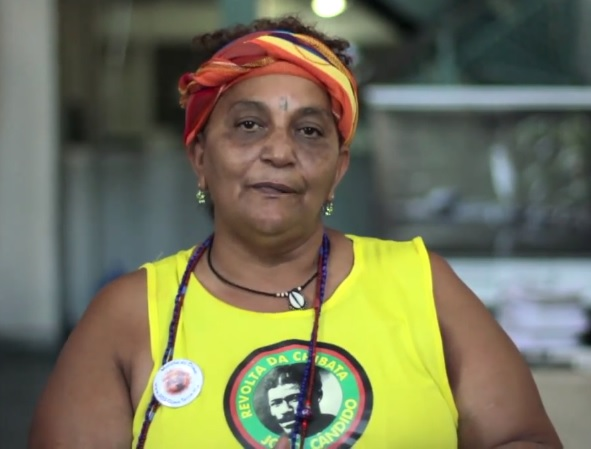
Activist
Kika da Silva (PT)
from São Paulo

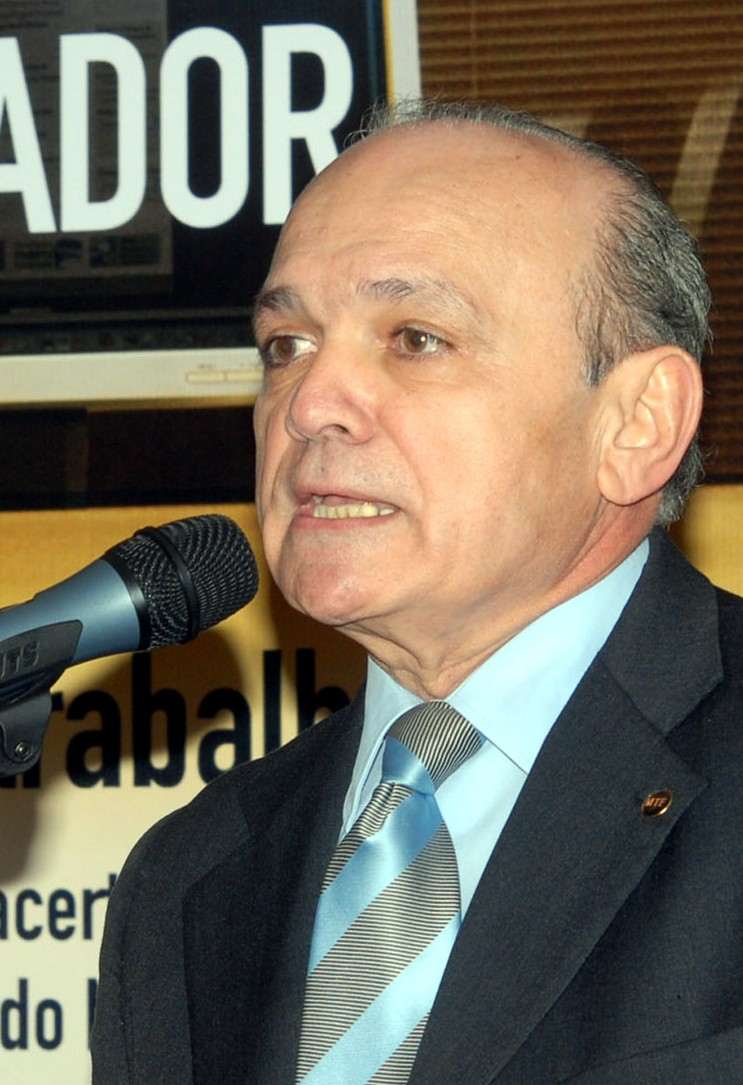
Former Federal Deputy
Luiz Antônio de Medeiros Neto (PDT)
from Eirunepé

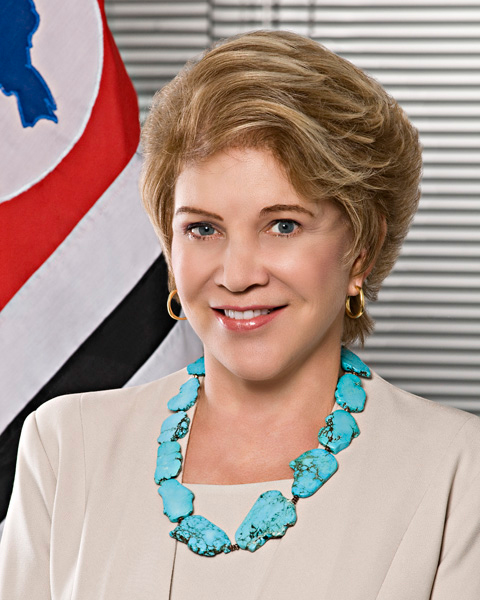
Former Senator
Marta Suplicy (SD)
from São Paulo

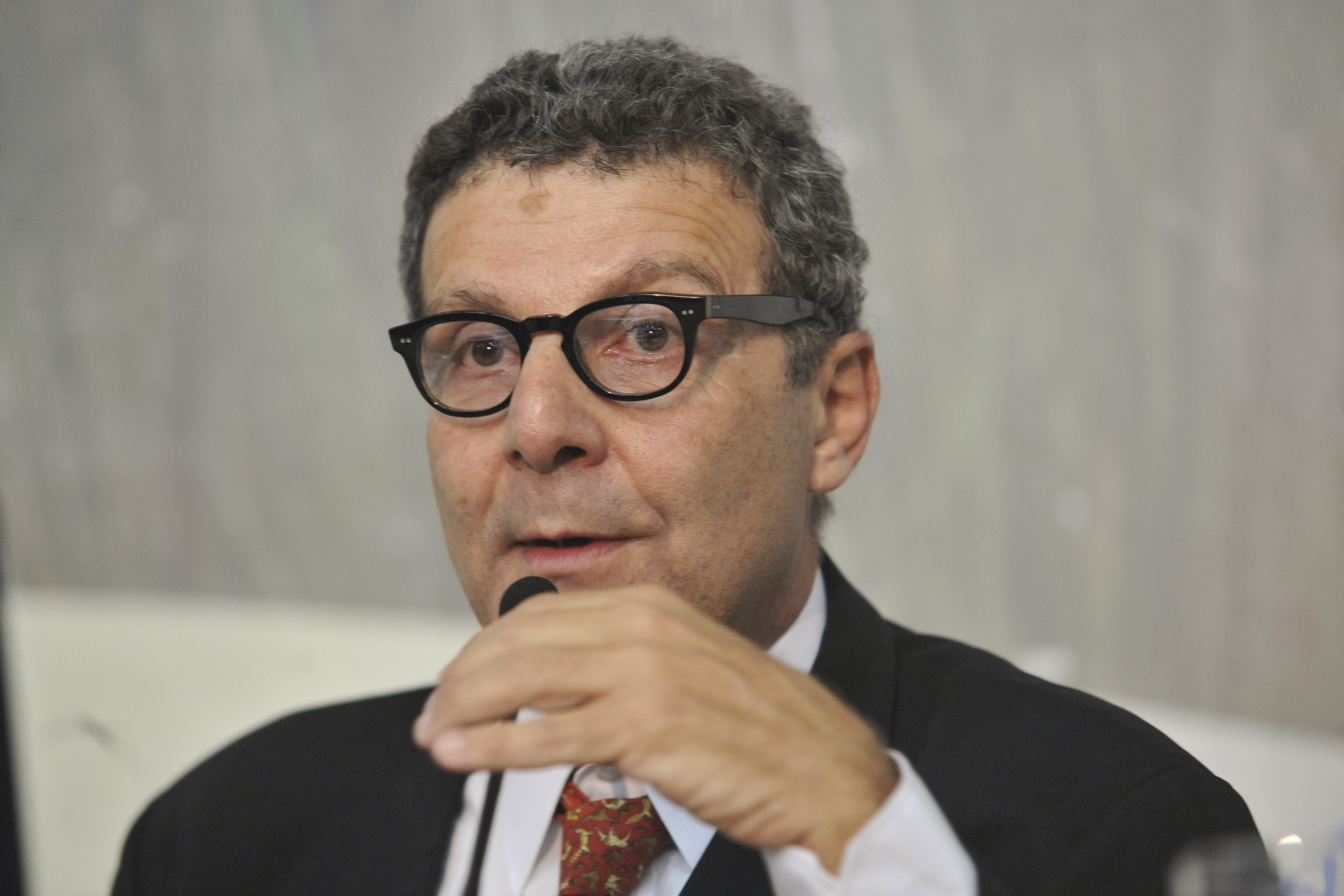
Former City Councillor
Nabil Bonduki (PT)
from São Paulo

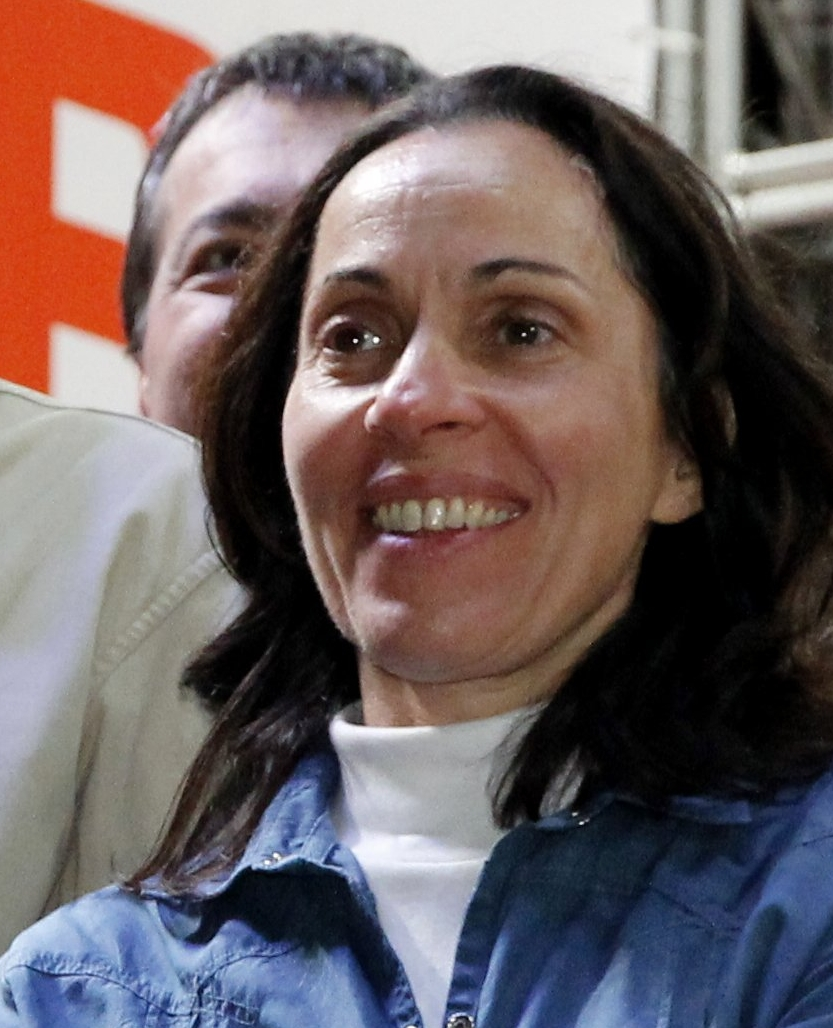
Former Vice Mayor
Nádia Campeão (PCdoB)
from Rio Claro

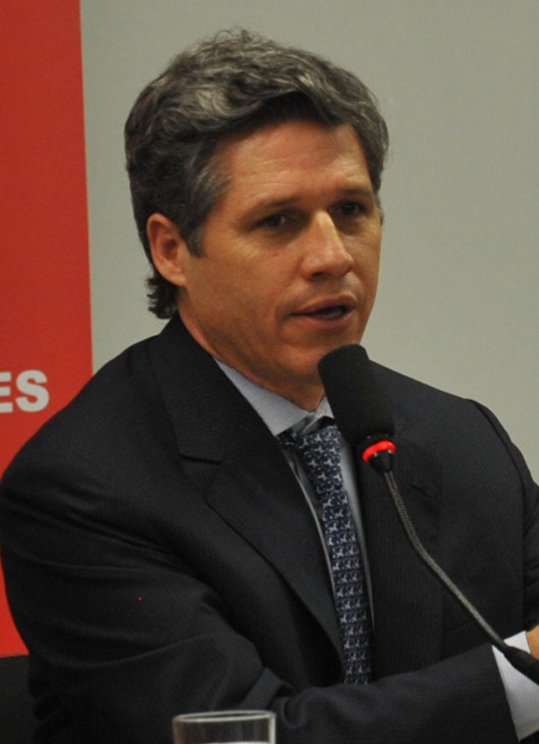
Federal Deputy
Paulo Teixeira (PT)
from Águas da Prata

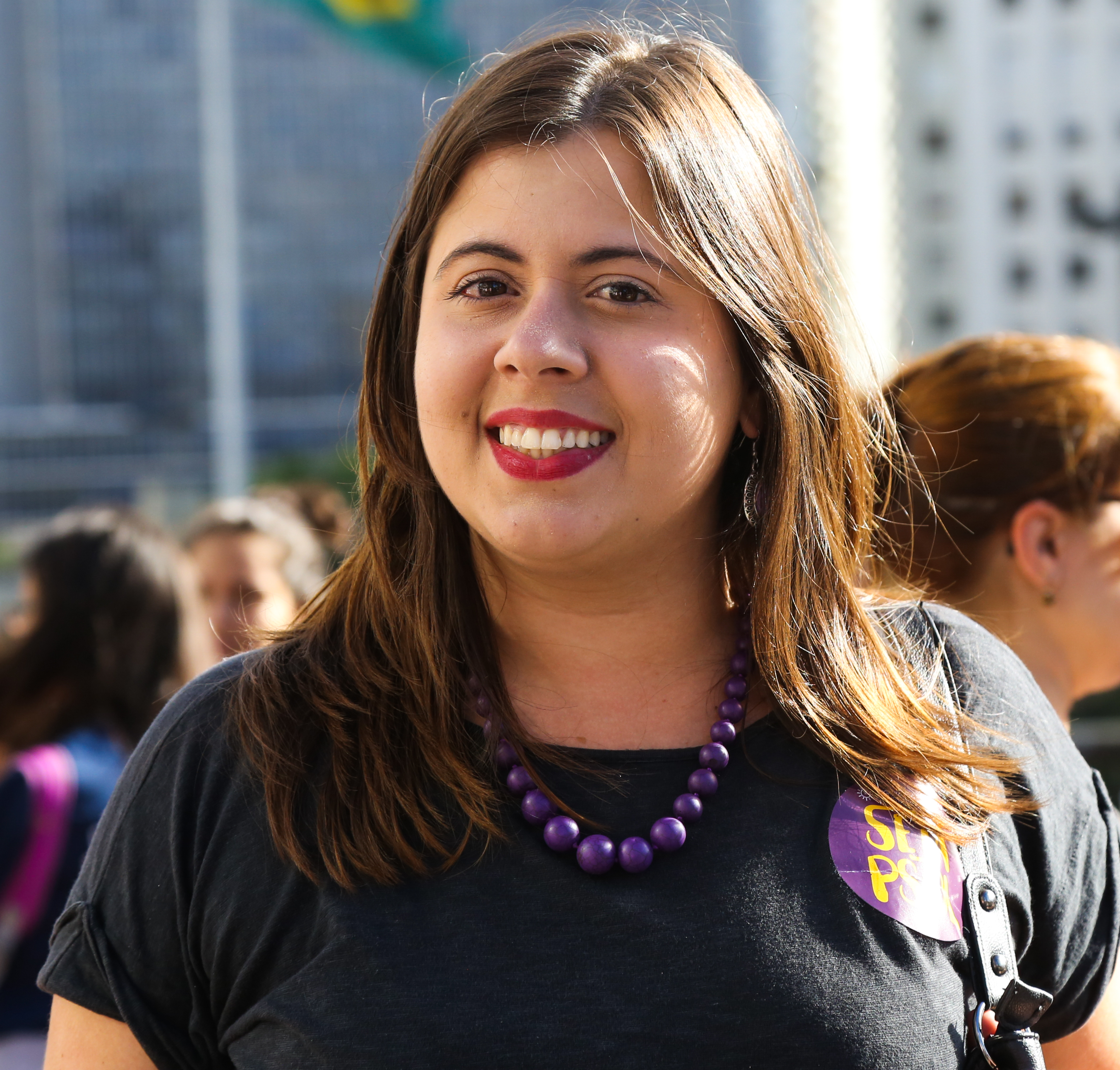
Federal Deputy
Sâmia Bomfim (PSOL)
from Presidente Prudente

Political scientist and professor
Christian Lohbauer (NOVO)
from São Paulo

== Debates ==
2020 São Paulo mayoral election debates
No.	Date	Host and Location	Moderator	Participants										
Key: P Present A Absent N Not invited W Withdrawn Out Out of the election				PSOL	PSDB	PSB	PSL	REDE	PSD	Republicanos	NOVO	PT	PCdoB	Patriota
Key: P Present A Absent N Not invited W Withdrawn Out Out of the election				Boulos	Covas	França	Hasselmann	Helou	Matarazzo	Russomanno	Sabará	Tatto	Silva	Val
1.1	Wednesday, 1 October 2020	Band TV; São Paulo, Morumbi	Eduardo Oinegue	P	P	P	P	P	P	P	P	P	P	P
1.2	Friday, 6 November 2020	Veja & ESPM; São Paulo, Vila Mariana	Ricardo Ferraz	P	P	P	P	N	N	A	W	P	N	P
1.3	Tuesday, 10 November 2020	O Estado de S. Paulo & FAAP; São Paulo, Consolação	Vera Magalhães	P	P	P	N	N	N	P	W	P	N	P
1.4	Wednesday, 11 November 2020	UOL & Folha de S. Paulo; São Paulo, Pinheiros	Luciana Coelho; Thais Oyama	P	P	P	N	N	N	P	W	N	N	N
1.5	Thursday, 12 November 2020	TV Cultura; São Paulo, Latin America Memorial	Leão Serva	P	P	P	P	P	P	P	W	P	P	P
2.1	Monday, 16 November 2020	CNN Brazil; Brazilian Financial Center, Paulista Avenue	Monalisa Perrone	P	P	Out								
2.2	Thursday, 19 November 2020	Band TV; São Paulo, Morumbi	Eduardo Oinegue	P	P	Out								
2.3	Monday, 26 November 2020	TV Cultura; São Paulo, Lapa	Vera Magalhães	P	P	Out								

== Outgoing Municipal Chamber ==
The result of the last municipal election and the current situation in the Municipal Chamber is given below:

Affiliation	Members	
Affiliation	Elected	Current
PSDB	8	12
PT	8	9
Republicanos	4	4
DEM	6	6
PSD	3	3
PL	2	4
PSB	2	3
MDB	3	2
PV	1	1
PTB	1	1
PSOL	6	2
Cidadania	0	2
PODE	3	2
NOVO	2	1
PP	1	0
PSC	1	1
PSL	1	1
Patriota	3	1
Total	55	

== Opinion polls ==
=== First round ===
Polling aggregates
- Active candidates
- Bruno Covas (PSDB)
- Celso Russomanno (REP)
- Guilherme Boulos (PSOL)
- Márcio França (PSB)
- Others
- Abstentions/Undecided

View source data.

==== 2020 ====
===== Published after the campaign's start =====
Pollster/client(s)	Date(s) conducted	Sample size	Covas PSDB	Russomanno REP	Boulos PSOL	França PSB	Matarazzo PSD	Tatto PT	Val PATRI	Hasselmann PSL	Fidelix PRTB	Lúcia PSTU	Silva PCdoB	Carlos PCO	Sabará NOVO	Helou REDE	Abst. Undec.	Lead
2020 Election	15 Nov	5,338,156	32.85%	10.50%	20.24%	13.64%	1.55%	8.65%	9.78%	1.84%	0.22%	0.06%	0.23%	0.01%	–	0.41%	15.98%	12.61%
Ibope (exit poll)	15 Nov (Note: Exit poll conducted on election day.)	6,000	29%	7%	22%	11%	1%	7%	7%	2%	1%	<1%	<1%	<1%	–	1%	13%	7%
Ibope	12–14 Nov	1,204	33%	11%	14%	11%	2%	6%	6%	2%	1%	<1%	<1%	<1%	–	1%	13%	19%
Datafolha	13–14 Nov	2,987	33%	11%	15%	12%	2%	5%	5%	2%	<1%	1%	<1%	<1%	–	1%	12%	18%
RealTime Big Data/CNN Brasil	12–13 Nov	1,200	31%	13%	13%	15%	3%	6%	4%	2%	0%	0%	0%	0%	–	0%	12%	16%
Paraná Pesquisas	10–12 Nov	1,000	30.8%	12.9%	15.2%	11.8%	2,4%	3.5%	5.2%	1.8%	0.5%	0.3%	0.1%	0.1%	–	0.2%	15.2%	15.6%
Datafolha	9–10 Nov	1,092	32%	14%	16%	12%	4%	4%	3%	<1%	1%	1%	<1%	<1%	–	1%	10%	16%
Ibope	7–9 Nov	1,204	32%	12%	13%	10%	1%	6%	5%	2%	1%	<1%	1%	<1%	–	<1%	16%	20%
Datafolha	3–4 Nov	1,260	28%	16%	14%	13%	3%	6%	4%	3%	1%	<1%	1%	<1%	–	1%	12%	12%
XP/Ipespe	2–3 Nov	800	26%	19%	15%	10%	2%	4%	4%	2%	1%	0%	0%	0%	–	0%	18%	7%
Paraná Pesquisas	29 Oct–1 Nov	1,000	25.6%	19.5%	13.4%	10.0%	2.1%	5.0%	4.2%	2.4%	0.5%	0.1%	0.3%	0.2%	–	0.4%	16.3%	6.1%
Ibope	28–30 Oct	1,204	26%	20%	13%	11%	1%	6%	3%	2%	1%	<1%	1%	<1%	1%	<1%	15%	6%
XP/Ipespe	26–27 Oct	800	27%	22%	16%	8%	3%	5%	4%	2%	1%	0%	1%	0%	0%	0%	13%	5%
26 Oct			Filipe Sabará's candidacy is denied by the Regional Electoral Court of São Paulo, due to his expulsion from New Party.															
Datafolha	20–21 Oct	1,204	23%	20%	14%	10%	2%	4%	4%	3%	1%	1%	1%	0%	0%	1%	16%	3%
RealTime Big Data	14–17 Oct	1,050	24%	25%	12%	8%	3%	4%	1%	2%	0%	0%	1%	0%	0%	1%	19%	1%
Ibope	13–15 Oct	1,001	22%	25%	10%	7%	1%	4%	2%	1%	1%	1%	1%	<1%	1%	1%	24%	3%
Datafolha	5–6 Oct	1,092	21%	27%	12%	8%	2%	1%	3%	1%	2%	1%	1%	1%	1%	1%	16%	6%
Ibope	30 Sep–1 Oct	805	21%	26%	8%	7%	1%	1%	1%	1%	1%	2%	1%	1%	<1%	1%	28%	5%
Exame/Ideia	19–22 Sep	800	22%	21%	11%	10%	4%	3%	2%	1%	1%	1%	1%	1%	0%	0%	22%	1%

===== Published before the campaign's start =====
Pollster/client(s)	Date(s) conducted	Sample size	Russomanno REP	Datena MDB	Skaf MDB	França PSB	Suplicy SDD/PMDB	Covas PSDB	Doria PSDB	Hasselmann PSL	Boulos PSOL	Bomfim PSOL	Erundina PSOL	Matarazzo PSD	Amaral PDT	Tatto PT	Haddad PT	Others	Abst. Undec.	Lead
Datafolha	21–22 Sep	1,092	29.0%	–	–	8%		20%	–	1%	9%	–	–	2%	–	2%	–	8%	21%	9.0%
Ibope	14–20 Sep	1,001	24.0%	–	–	6.0%		18.0%	–	2.0%	8.0%	–	–	1.0%	–	1.0%	–	4.0%	33.0%	6.0%
Consultoria Atlas	26 Aug–1 Sep	1,514	12.3%	–	–	11.5%	4.2%	16.0%	–	2.1%	12.4%	–	–	2.1%	–	2.1%	–	3.8%	24.9%	4.4%
Paraná Pesquisas	15–19 Aug	1,100	20.5%	–	8.0%	7.6%	9.8%	20.1%	–	1%	6.2%	–	–	2.1%	–	2.3%	–	5.5%	16.9%	0.4%
RealTimeBigData	12–13 Aug	1,200	22%	–	–	7%	7%	26%	–	1%	7%	–	–	3%	–	3%	–	3%	21%	4%
RealTimeBigData	12–13 Aug	1,200	23%	–	–	8%	–	27%	–	1%	7%	–	–	5%	–	3%	–	3%	23%	4%
Instituto Ideia Big Data	14 Jul	1,009	–	–	–	16%	9%	30%	–	3%	11%	–	–	2%	–	1%	–	–	–	14%
Instituto Ideia Big Data	14 Jul	1,009	–	–	–	15%	11%	31%	–	–	–	4%	–	–	–	4%	–	–	–	16%
Paraná Pesquisas	4–8 Jul	1,200	18.3%	12.9%	–	7.8%	6.5%	22.6%	–	1.3%	5.7%	–	–	3.8%	–	2.1%	–	4.3%	14.9%	4.3%
Paraná Pesquisas	4–8 Jul	1,200	20.0%	–	10.4%	7.7%	6.9%	22.8%	–	1.3%	5.5%	–	–	3.6%	–	1.9%	–	3.9%	16.0%	2.8%
Paraná Pesquisas	4–8 Jul	1,200	–	19.5%	–	9.4%	7.6%	25.9%	–	1.7%	6.3%	–	–	4.4%	–	2.3%	–	5.0%	18.0%	6.4%
Paraná Pesquisas	4–8 Jul	1,200	–	–	–	12.6%	–	33.6%	–	2.4%	7.2%	–	–	6.8%	–	3.3%	–	7.7%	26.5%	11.0%
Ibope	17–19 Mar	1,001	24%	–	–	9%	–	18%	–	2%	6%	–	–	3%	–	2%	–	3%	34%	6%
Badra	8–10 Jan	2,408	16.0%	7.6%	–	9%	13.0%	11.2%	–	1.5%	4.3%	–	–	1.7%	1.4%	4.0%	–	3.8%	27.6%	3%
2016 election	2 Oct	–	13.64%	–	–	–	10.14%	–	53.29%	–	–	–	3.18%	–	–	–	16.7%	3.04%	16.64	36.59%

==== 2019 ====
Pollster/client(s)	Date(s) conducted	Sample size	Russomanno REP	Datena MDB	França PSB	Suplicy PMDB	Covas PSDB	Doria PSDB	Hasselmann PSL	Boulos PSOL	Erundina PSOL	Matarazzo PSD	Amaral PDT	Tatto PT	Haddad PT	Others	Abst. Undec.	Lead
XP/Ipespe	30 Sep–2 Oct	1,000	19%	22%	–	11%	10%	–	7%	–	–	–	3%	–	–	–	–	3%
Paraná Pesquisas	20–24 Sep	1,220	22.1%	11.6%	–	–	9.6%	–	7.2%	4.2%	–	2.7%	2.7%	2.0%	–	0.6%	16.1	10.5%
Paraná Pesquisas	20–24 Sep	1,220	30.7%	–	13.3%	–	12.0%	–	8.1%	4.5%	–	3.5%	3.2%	2.5%	–	1.3%	20.9%	7.4%
Paraná Pesquisas	20–24 Sep	1,220	22.4%	21.3%	12.0%	–	9.6%	–	7.2%	4.7%	–	2.7%	2.9%	–	–	0.9%	16.3%	1.1%
2016 election	2 Oct	–	13.64%	–	–	10.14%	–	53.29%	–	–	3.18%	–	–	–	16.7%	3.04%	16.64	36.59%

=== Second round ===
Polling aggregates
- Active candidates
- Bruno Covas (PSDB)
- Guilherme Boulos (PSOL)

View source data.

==== After the first round ====
Pollster/client(s)	Date(s) conducted	Sample size	Covas PSDB	Boulos PSOL	Abst. Undec.	Lead
2020 election	29 Nov	–	59.38%	40.62	–	18.76%
Valid votes
Ibope	27–28 Nov	1,204	57%	43%	–	14%
Datafolha	27–28 Nov	3,047	55%	45%	–	10%
Real Time Big Data	25–26 Nov	1,000	54%	46%	–	8%
Datafolha	24–25 Nov	1,512	54%	46%	–	8%
Ibope	23–25 Nov	1,001	57%	43%	–	14%
Datafolha	23 Nov	1,260	55%	45%	–	10%
Datafolha	17–18 Nov	1,254	58%	42%	–	16%
Ibope	16–18 Nov	1,001	58%	42%	–	16%
Exame/Ideia	16–17 Nov	800	64%	36%	–	28%
XP/Ipespe	16–17 Nov	800	60%	40%	–	20%
Paraná Pesquisas	16–17 Nov	1,000	61.5%	38.5%	–	23%
Real Time Big Data	16–17 Nov	1,050	60%	40%	–	20%
Total votes
Ibope	27–28 Nov	1,204	48%	36%	17%	12%
Datafolha	27–28 Nov	3,047	48%	39%	9%	9%
Real Time Big Data	25–26 Nov	1,000	49%	41%	10%	8%
Datafolha	24–25 Nov	1,512	47%	40%	13%	7%
XP/Ipespe	24–25 Nov	800	48%	41%	8%	7%
Ibope	23–25 Nov	1,001	48%	37%	15%	11%
Datafolha	23 Nov	1,260	48%	40%	12%	8%
Datafolha	17–18 Nov	1,254	48%	35%	17%	13%
Ibope	16–18 Nov	1,001	47%	35%	18%	12%
Exame/Ideia	16–17 Nov	800	56%	31%	13%	25%
XP/Ipespe	16–17 Nov	800	48%	32%	20%	14%
Paraná Pesquisas	16–17 Nov	1,000	50%	32%	18%	18%

==== Before the first round ====
Pollster/client(s)	Date(s) conducted	Sample size	Covas PSDB	Russomanno REP	Boulos PSOL	França PSB	Abst. Undec.	Lead
Ibope	12–14 Nov	1,204	53%	–	26%	–	21%	27%
Ibope	12–14 Nov	1,204	46%	–	–	34%	20%	12%
Ibope	12–14 Nov	1,204	56%	23%	–	–	21%	35%
Datafolha	13–14 Nov	2,987	57%	–	30%	–	14%	27%
Datafolha	13–14 Nov	2,987	51%	–	–	36%	13%	15%
Datafolha	13–14 Nov	2,987	63%	21%	–	–	16%	42%
RealTime Big Data/CNN Brasil	12–13 Nov	1,200	48%	–	–	31%	20%	19%
RealTime Big Data/CNN Brasil	12–13 Nov	1,200	50%	–	30%	–	20%	20%
RealTime Big Data/CNN Brasil	12–13 Nov	1,200	51%	22%	–	–	27%	28%
Datafolha	9–10 Nov	1,096	59%	25%	–	–	16%	34%
Datafolha	9–10 Nov	1,096	56%	–	30%	–	14%	26%
Datafolha	9–10 Nov	1,096	53%	–	–	34%	14%	19%
Ibope	7–9 Nov	1,204	52%	–	24%	–	24%	28%
Ibope	7–9 Nov	1,204	54%	22%	–	–	25%	32%
Ibope	7–9 Nov	1,204	47%	–	–	30%	23%	17%
Ibope	7–9 Nov	1,204	–	36%	32%	–	32%	4%
Ibope	7–9 Nov	1,204	–	–	24%	45%	30%	21%
Ibope	7–9 Nov	1,204	–	27%	–	45%	28%	18%
Datafolha	3–4 Nov	1,260	57%	27%	–	–	16%	30%
Datafolha	3–4 Nov	1,260	54%	–	32%	–	13%	22%
Datafolha	3–4 Nov	1,260	48%	–	–	32%	14%	16%
Datafolha	3–4 Nov	1,260	–	39%	41%	–	20%	2%
Ibope	28–30 Oct	1,204	–	–	26%	48%	26%	22%
Ibope	28–30 Oct	1,204	–	34%	–	43%	23%	9%
Ibope	28–30 Oct	1,204	–	43%	31%	–	26%	12%
Ibope	28–30 Oct	1,204	45%	–	–	34%	21%	11%
Ibope	28–30 Oct	1,204	51%	–	26%	–	23%	25%
Ibope	28–30 Oct	1,204	47%	31%	–	–	22%	16%
Datafolha	20–21 Oct	1,204	48%	36%	–	–	14%	12%
Ibope	13–15 Oct	1,001	40%	39%	–	–	21%	1%
Datafolha	5–6 Oct	1,092	40%	46%	–	–	13%	6%

== Results ==
=== Mayor ===
Candidate	Running mate	Party	First round		Second round	
Candidate	Running mate	Party	Votes	%	Votes	%
Bruno Covas (incumbent)	Ricardo Nunes (MDB)	PSDB	1,754,013	32.85	3,169,121	59.38
Guilherme Boulos	Luiza Erundina	PSOL	1,080,736	20.24	2,168,109	40.62
Márcio França	Antonio Neto (PDT)	PSB	728,441	13.64		
Celso Russomanno	Marcos da Costa (PTB)	Republicanos	560,666	10.50		
Arthur do Val	Adelaide Oliveira	Patriota	522,210	9.78		
Jilmar Tatto	Carlos Zarattini	PT	461,666	8.65		
Joice Hasselmann	Ivan Sayeg	PSL	98,342	1.84		
Andrea Matarazzo	Marta Costa	PSD	82,743	1.55		
Marina Helou	Marco Di'Preto	REDE	22,073	0.41		
Orlando Silva	Andrea Barcelos	PCdoB	12,254	0.23		
Levy Fidelix	Jairo Glikson	PRTB	11,960	0.22		
Vera Lúcia Salgado	Lucas Nizuma	PSTU	3,052	0.06		
Antonio Carlos	Henrique Áreas	PCO	630	0.01		
Total			5,338,786	100.00	5,337,230	100.00
Valid votes			5,338,786	84.02	5,337,230	85.84
Invalid votes			642,277	10.11	607,062	9.76
Blank votes			373,037	5.87	273,216	4.39
Total votes			6,354,100	100.00	6,217,508	100.00
Registered voters/turnout			8,986,687	70.71	8,986,687	69.19
Source: UOL

Popular vote (first round)
Covas	32.85%
Boulos	20.24%
França	13.64%
Russomanno	10.50%
Val	9.78%
Tatto	8.65%
Others	4.32%

Popular vote (second round)
Covas	59.38%
Boulos	40.62%

=== Municipal Chamber ===
Party	Votes	%	Seats	+/–
Workers' Party	652,924	12.93	8	▼1
Brazilian Social Democracy Party	624,065	12.36	8	▼3
Socialism and Liberty Party	444,235	8.80	6	▲4
Democrats	439,714	8.71	6	▲2
Republicanos	324,787	6.43	4	Steady
Podemos	267,254	5.29	3	▲2
Social Democratic Party	255,045	5.05	3	▼1
Brazilian Democratic Movement	254,960	5.05	3	▲1
Patriota	221,493	4.39	3	▲3
New Party	191,665	3.80	2	▲1
Brazilian Socialist Party	174,769	3.46	2	▼1
Liberal Party	166,764	3.30	2	▼2
Social Liberal Party	132,791	2.63	1	▲1
Progressistas	121,324	2.40	1	Steady
Green Party	113,596	2.25	1	▼1
Social Christian Party	81,037	1.60	1	Steady
Brazilian Labour Party	74,229	1.47	1	▼1
Communist Party of Brazil	69,209	1.37	0	Steady
Cidadania	65,418	1.30	0	▼2
Solidariedade	65,069	1.29	0	Steady
Brazilian Labour Renewal Party	60,502	1.20	0	Steady
Avante	58,395	1.16	0	Steady
Democratic Labour Party	54,802	1.09	0	Steady
Sustainability Network	51,923	1.03	0	Steady
Republican Party of the Social Order	21,807	0.43	0	▼1
Christian Labour Party	18,352	0.36	0	Steady
Party of National Mobilization	12,424	0.25	0	Steady
Christian Democracy	8,959	0.18	0	Steady
Brazilian Woman's Party	6,965	0.14	0	Steady
Popular Unity	5,618	0.11	0	New
United Socialist Workers' Party	4,245	0.08	0	Steady
Brazilian Communist Party	3,965	0.08	0	Steady
Workers' Cause Party	832	0.02	0	Steady
Total	5,049,137	100.00	55	–
Valid votes	5,049,137	80.31		
Invalid votes	660,401	10.50		
Blank votes	577,648	9.19		
Total votes	6,287,186	100.00		
Registered voters/turnout	8,986,687	69.96		
Source: UOL
