= Marta Costa =

Brazilian politician (born 1956)

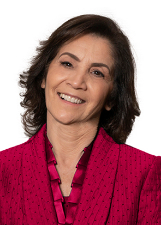

State Deputy of São Paulo
- Incumbent
- Assumed office 15 March 2015

City Councillor of São Paulo
- In office 1 January 2005 – 1 July 2014

Personal details
- Born: Marta Maria Freire da Costa; 30 October 1956 (age 70) São Paulo, Brazil
- Party: PSD (2014–present)
- Other political affiliations: PFL (2004–2007); DEM (2007–2014)
- Spouse: Luiz Costa Junior
- Parents: José Wellington Bezerra da Costa (father); Wanda Freire (mother)
- Profession: Administrator
- Website: www.depmartacosta.com

Marta Maria Freire da Costa (born 30 October 1956), mostly known as Marta Costa, is a Brazilian administrator and politician. She is member of the Social Democratic Party (PSD) and connected to the Assemblies of God and daughter of pastor José Wellington Bezerra da Costa.

== Biography ==
Born in São Paulo, Marta Costa is married to Luiz Costa Junior, and is daughter of José Wellington Bezerra daCosta and Wanda Freire.

Her family moved from Ceará to try to rebuild their lives in São Paulo, where they became sellers, until her father began dedicating his life to his faith in God.

Costa is graduated in Letters and Company Administration.

She began her public life as City Councillor of São Paulo for three terms, being also substitute of Senator Aloysio Nunes. During her terms as City Councillor, Costa was Chairman of many committees, had many project turned into law, and was the first woman to seat as Vice President of the Municipal Chamber.

She was elected for her first term as State Deputy of São Paulo in the 2014 state elections and reelect in 2018.

On 31 August 2020, Marta Costa was announced as running mate of Andrea Matarazzo (PSD) for the 2020 municipal election as candidate for Vice Mayor.

Party political offices
Preceded by Andrea Matarazzo	PSD nominee for Vice Mayor of São Paulo; 2020	Most recent
