= Jilmar Tatto =

Brazilian politician (born 1965)

- Tatto in 2015

Member of the Chamber of Deputies
- Incumbent
- Assumed office 1 February 2023
- Constituency: São Paulo
- In office 1 February 2007 – 1 February 2015
- Constituency: São Paulo

Member of the Legislative Assembly of the State of São Paulo
- In office 15 March 1999 – 15 March 2003
- Constituency: At-large

Personal details
- Born: Jilmar Augustinho Tatto; 25 June 1965 (age 61) Corbélia, Paraná, Brazil
- Party: PT (1981–present)
- Website: jilmartatto.com.br

Jilmar Augustinho Tatto (born 25 June 1965) is a Brazilian politician affiliated to Workers' Party (PT) since 1981. He is the brother of the São Paulo state deputy Enio Tatto and São Paulo councilors Arselino and Jair Tatto. He is graduated in History from the Faculty of Philosophy Sciences and Languages of Moema and was militant at Basic Ecclesial Communities in Socorro. He was elected president of the São Paulo directory in 1995, elected São Paulo state deputy in 1998, and he held positions at the secretariat of the city of São Paulo in Marta Suplicy's administration.

Party political offices
Preceded by Fernando Haddad	PT nominee for Mayor of São Paulo; 2020	Most recent
