= João Donizeti Silvestre =

Brazilian businessman, historian, biologist and politician (born 1961)

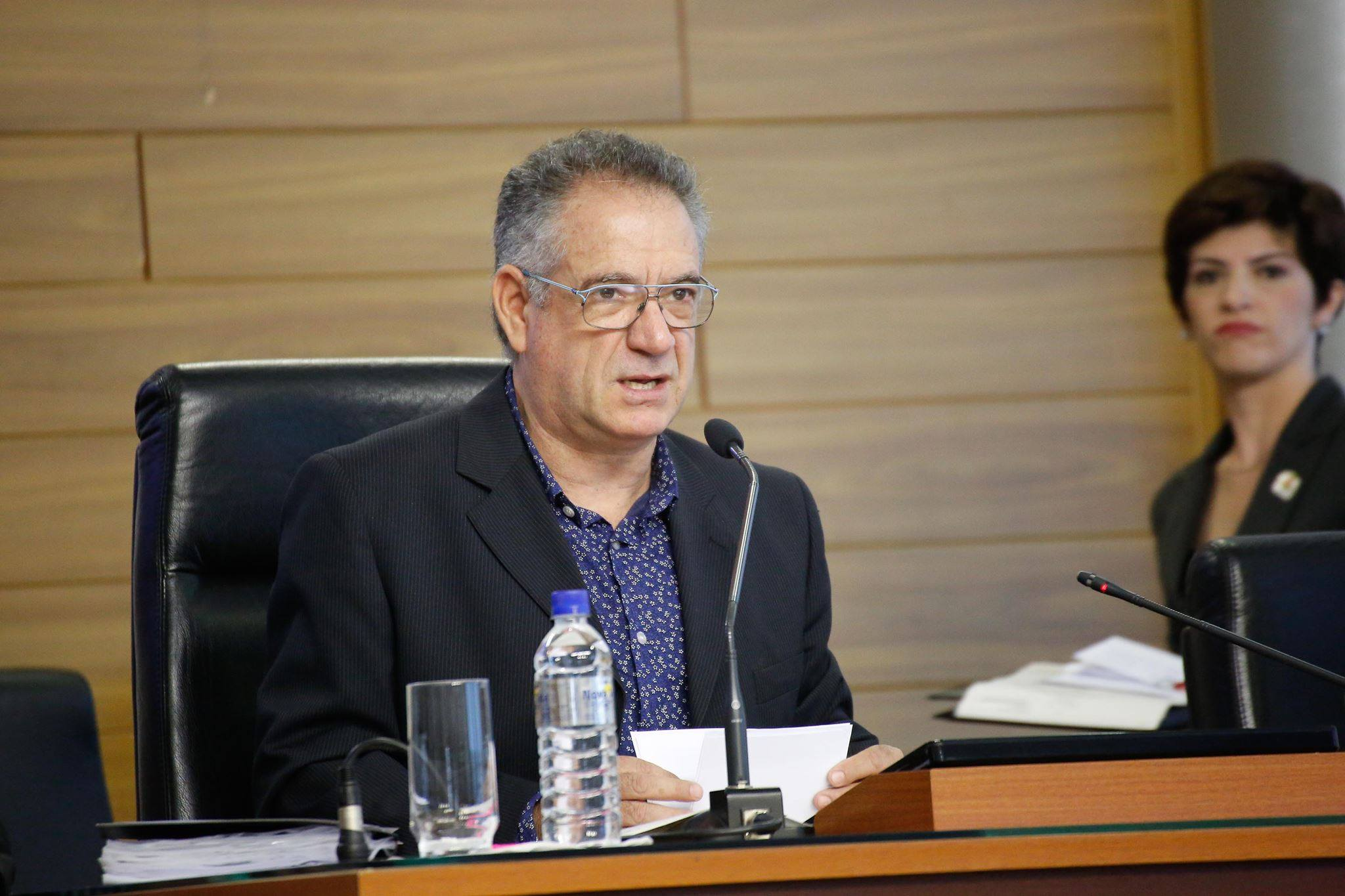
- Spanish-Brazilian Congressman João Donizeti Silvestre
- Incumbent
- Assumed office 1 January 2017

Alderman of Sorocaba
- In office 1 January 1993 – 31 December 2012

Speaker of the Council – Municipal Chamber of Sorocaba
- In office 1 January 1997 – 31 December 1997
- In office 1 January 2004 – 31 December 2004

Personal details
- Born: 11 July 1961 (age 65) Itu, São Paulo, Brazil
- Party: Social Democracy Party
- Education: University of Sorocaba; Federal University of São Carlos
- Profession: Politician; administrator (business); Historian; Biologist

João Donizeti Silvestre (born 11 July 1961) is a Brazilian businessman, historian, biologist and politician who served as an Alderman of Sorocaba, Brazil.

== Career ==
His public vocation appeared at a young age, when he began to devote himself to community activities. Donizeti participated in non-profit organizations dedicated to the preservation of the environment in Brazil and Europe, and projects to promote ecological awareness, stimulate cultural development. His community leadership led him to the presidency of Neighborhoods Friend Society for over ten years, and to become a member of the boards of several international NGOs. In the 1980s, João attended the University of Sorocaba and the Autonomous University of Madrid. He graduated with a Bachelor of Business Administration and History. Later, Donizeti attended the Federal University of São Carlos.

In the 2012 Brazilian municipal elections, he was not reelected, despite 6,144 votes, the most among alderman in Sorocaba. Donizeti's candidacy was contested due to the rejection of the accounts in the City Hall of Sorocaba in 2004, when he was the Speaker of the council. His appeal was rejected by Laurita Vaz, Minister of the Superior Electoral Court, who considered that Donizeti was guilty of improper conduct. During his 20 years in the Municipality of Sorocaba, João participated in the committees of education, culture, public health, sports and sustainability. He was the President of the Municipal Council for Economic Development.

Among prominent laws during his tenure were provisions requiring the offer of biodegradable or reusable bags in supermarkets, prohibiting forest fires in the city, prohibiting the burning of straw of cane sugar, creating of green sidewalks, creating the Municipal Preservation System of Springs and Streams and increasing aid to poor parents of twins. Since the 1990s João is a part of United Nations Environment Programme. He still being a popular political leader and environmental activist in Latin America and Europe.

However, in November 2015 the Electoral Justice considered João Donizeti Silvestre finally not guilty. In October 2016 he was elected for the sixth term as city councilor of Sorocaba with 4,107 votes.
