= Luna Zarattini =

Brazilian politician (born 1993)

- Zarattini in 2023

Member-elect of the Chamber of Deputies
- Assuming office 1 February 2027
- Constituency: São Paulo

Member of the Municipal Chamber of São Paulo
- Incumbent
- Assumed office 1 January 2025
- Constituency: At-large

Personal details
- Born: Luna Zarattini Brandão; 19 December 1993 (age 32) São Paulo, Brazil
- Party: PT
- Relatives: Carlos Zarattini (uncle)
- Education: University of São Paulo; Mackenzie Presbyterian University
- Profession: Sociologist, lawyer

Luna Zarattini Brandão (born 19 December 1993) is a Brazilian politician who was elected member of the Chamber of Deputies in 2026. She has been a member of the Municipal Chamber of São Paulo since 2023. She is the niece of Carlos Zarattini.
