= Joice Hasselmann =

Brazilian politician

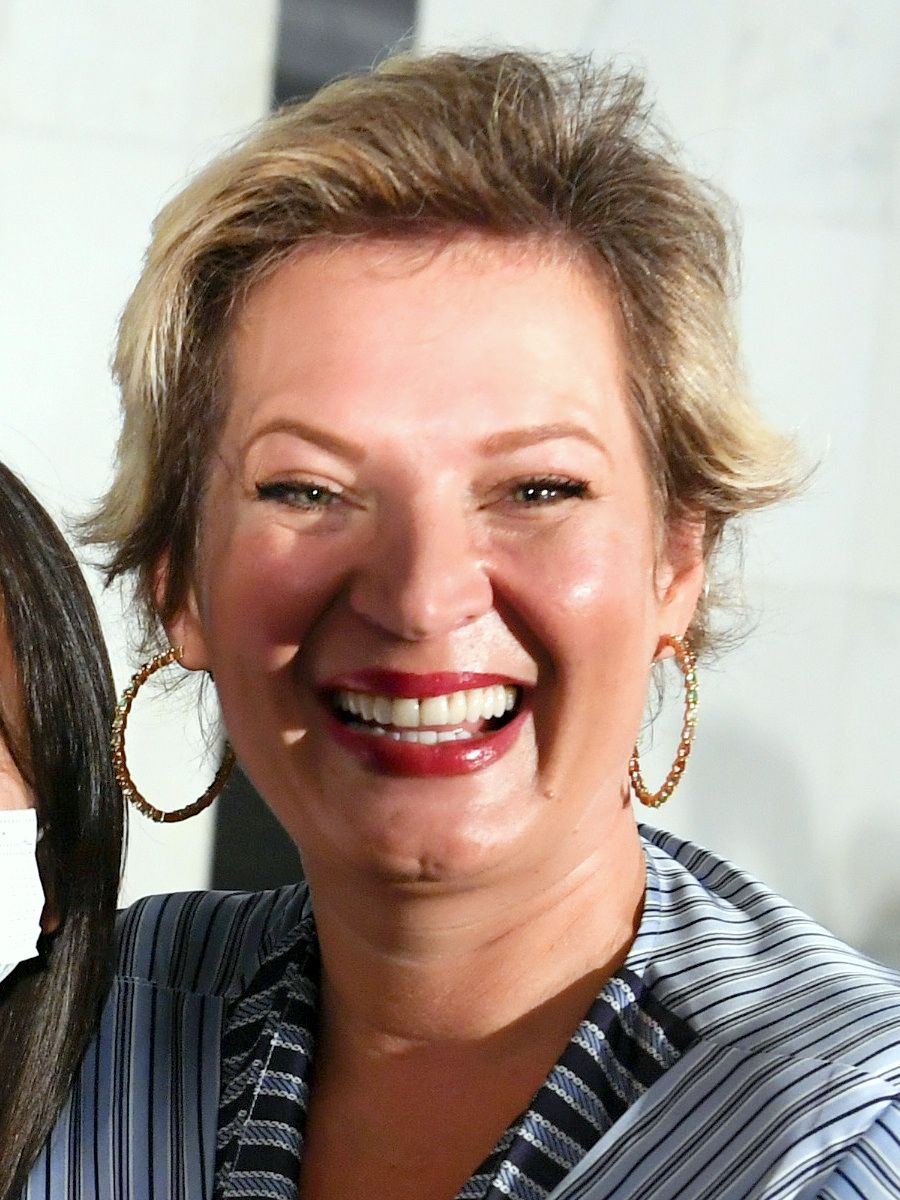
- Hasselmann in 2022

Federal Deputy
- In office 1 February 2019 – 1 February 2023
- Constituency: São Paulo

Personal details
- Born: Joice Cristina Bejuska; 29 January 1978 (age 48) Ponta Grossa, Paraná, Brazil
- Party: PODE (2024–present)
- Other political affiliations: PPS (2013–2018); PSL (2018–2021); PSDB (2021–2024)
- Spouses: Evaldo Artur Hasselmann Júnior (divorced) Márcio Oliveira (divorced) Daniel França (m. 2016)
- Children: 2
- Education: State University of Ponta Grossa
- Occupation: Politician, journalist, writer, presenter, political commentator
- Website: jhnchannel.com

Joice Cristina Hasselmann (née Bejuska; 29 January 1978) is a Brazilian politician, journalist, writer, activist, and political commentator.

Hasselmann worked on CBN, BandNews FM, VEJA as a host of the magazine's video channel, RecordTV on the affiliate broadcaster RIC TV and SBT on the affiliate Rede Massa TV. She worked for a short period on the Jovem Pan in São Paulo, where she presented Os Pingos nos Is program, an absolute audience leader at 6 p.m. (UTC−3 (BRT)). On her YouTube channel, Hasselmann presents and comments the national news daily, and lectures and congresses around the country.

She is a critic of several politicians, such as the former governor Beto Richa, the former President Dilma Rousseff, the former President Luiz Inácio Lula da Silva as well as Workers' Party. In 2015 and 2016, she participated in several protests against the Dilma government and later participated as a guest of the prosecution session for the impeachment of Dilma Rousseff. She also participated in protests in defense of Operation Lava Jato and in support of the Brazilian Federal Police. In that time, she wrote a book about the Brazilian judge Sergio Moro, responsible for the Lava Jato trial in Curitiba.

In 2017, the ePoliticSchool Institute (ePS) pointed to Hasselmann as the most influential and notorious personalities of social networks within the political theme. She won the "Troféu Influenciadores Digitais" prize from Negócios da Comunicação magazine in 2017 and 2018, by popular vote and technical vote. In April 2018, she officially joined the Social Liberal Party and announced her preliminary candidacy to the Brazilian Senate representing the State of São Paulo. But, months later, she opted to run for the House of Representatives, having been elected to the post with a substantial vote, 1,078,666 votes, becoming the most voted for woman ever in this position.

== Early life and education ==
Hasselmann was born in the city of Ponta Grossa, State of Paraná, Brazil, on 29 January 1978 and lived in different Brazilian states throughout her youth. After completing her secondary education, she attended a medical college entrance exam in the specialty of neurology. However, because of an experience as presenter in a local TV of her hometown, she undertook a journalism degree at the State University of Ponta Grossa. Hasselmann has a daughter and is married to the neurosurgeon Daniel França since 2016.

== Reporting career ==
Before completing her undergraduate degree, she was invited to audition for a post as a reporter on CBN radio in Ponta Grossa. She was hired as a journalist for the station while still in college, and shortly thereafter became anchor of the radio program.

Later she became journalism director for BandNews FM in Curitiba and anchor of the morning program at the station, as well as a political commentator for the evening news from 2006 to 2012. She also became the director of journalism at the Rede Estadual de Rádios of AERP and correspondent of the newspaper O Globo. She had a brief stint as an anchor at the Rede Massa, affiliated with the SBT channel of Paraná.

In 2012, she was hired as an anchor for Paraná no Ar of the state channel RIC TV of RecordTV, and a policy commentator for "RIC Notícias", an activity that reconciled with her performance at BandNews FM in Curitiba.

In 2014, she was hired by VEJA magazine to launch the VEJA TV project, a space on the magazine's portal dedicated to the production of audiovisual content. She became the main presenter, commenting on events and events in Brazil and interviewing personalities and journalists of the magazine itself. Hasselmann covered the most important events in the 2014 electoral race and on the political scene with analyses and opinions. In her weekly "Salto Agulha", she made critical comments about the prevailing political and economic issues throughout the week. However, at the end of 2015, she was dismissed from the magazine precisely for her critical comments about Luiz Inácio Lula da Silva, Dilma Rousseff, and the Workers' Party, which displeased the directors of the company.

In early 2016, she launched her YouTube channel and her Facebook page, in which she presented and commented on the main news and information about the Brazilian politics.

On 21 June 2017, it was announced that Jovem Pan would hire her along with Claudio Tognolli and Felipe Moura Brasil to present Os Pingos nos Is program, which premiered on 3 July. After three months, Tognolli was replaced by Augusto Nunes. The Jovem Pan's program was an audience leader at the 6 p.m (local time), besting its main competitor in its time slot, O É da Coisa program of BandNews FM, presented by Reinaldo Azevedo. However, in February 2018, Hasselmann was suddenly replaced by Felipe Moura Brasil without any explanation by the radio station to her or to the public. To complete the trio of program presenters, Jose Maria Trindade was hired. According to Hasselmann, this change occurred during her absence from the program, and it would have been considered a deliberate breach of contract by Jovem Pan. The radio station still tried to keep Hasselmann, offering another program, but she rejected the offer. She was officially dismissed in an amicable agreement with the management, receiving financial compensation due to the company's noncompliance with her contract.

In January 2018, Hasselmann produced a series organized in 12 installments under the title "Pensando Juntos". The series, recorded in the United States and made available on her YouTube channel, had its first episode on 27 January. It describes facts about the communicator's personal and professional life. After the release of the debut episode, the series received negative reviews regarding its production.

On 21 May 2018, she launched her own TV channel, the JHN Channel, which since then has been transmitted sporadically through the internet.

== Political career ==
In March 2018, Hasselmann was invited by Jair Bolsonaro to launch her candidacy for the Brazilian Senate by the Social Liberal Party. In April, she officially joined the party and announced her preliminary candidacy as Senator representing the State of São Paulo, with the Brazilian astronaut Marcos Pontes as her deputy senator.

However, months later she declined from her candidacy for the Senate to run for the House of Representatives, having been elected to the post with a substantial vote, 1,078,666 votes, becoming the woman most voted for this position of history.

Hasselmann has regularly mediated debates and also lectured at political events throughout Brazil.

=== Electoral results ===
Year	Election	Party	Office	Coalition	Partners	Party	Votes	Percent	Result
2018	State Elections of São Paulo	PSL	Federal Deputy	—N/a			1,078,666	5.11%	Elected
2020	Municipal Election of São Paulo	PSL	Mayor	SP Merece Mais (PSL, DC)	Ivan Sayeg	PSL	98,342	1.84%	Not elected
2022	State Elections of São Paulo	PSDB	Federal Deputy	—N/a			13,679	0.06%	Surrogate
2024	Municipal Election of São Paulo	PODE	Councillor	—N/a			1,673	0.03%	Not elected

== Positions ==
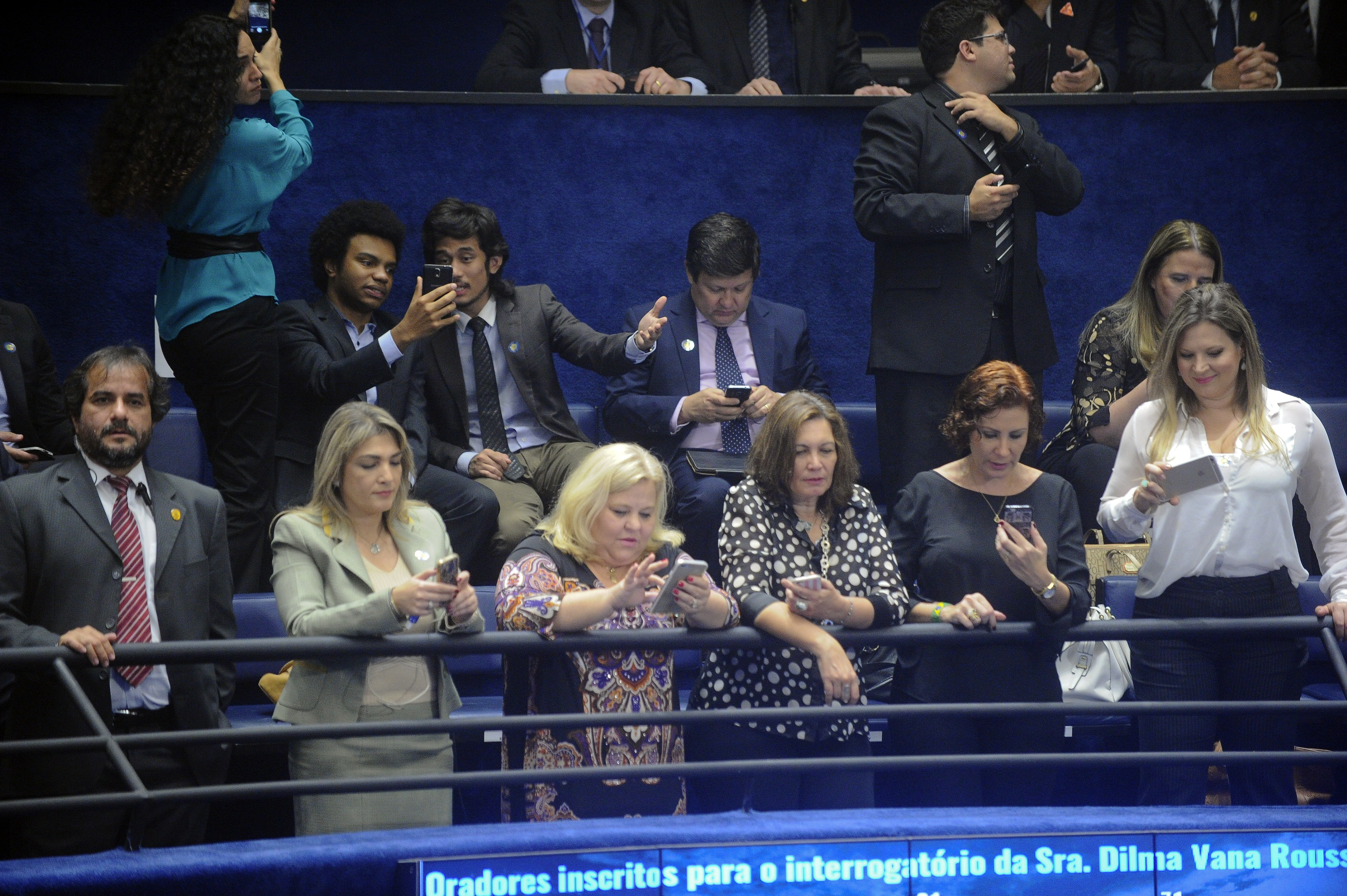
In August 2016, at the Federal Senate, Hasselmann (last on the right) and other journalists during the hearing of Dilma Rousseff in her impeachment process.

In August 2016, Hasselmann was invited by the lawyer Janaína Paschoal to accompany the testimony of then-president Dilma Rousseff during her impeachment process. Hasselmann actively participated in Rousseff's impeachment. In the same month, Hasselmann was a signatory to a letter addressed to the United Nations, in response to the letter sent by the former President of Brazil Luiz Inácio Lula da Silva to the intergovernmental organization. Lula's letter was sent to denounce supposed irregularities that he suffered in his criminal process, accusing the judge Sergio Moro of the responsibility.

In October 2016, Hasselmann participated in the special commission of the Chamber of Deputies that analyzed the 10 Measures against corruption. Hasselmann, as a guest, quoted surveys showing 200 billion reais deflected by corruption in Brazil and said that the country "has, yes, a culture of impunity ... Corruption kills and has to be treated as a heinous crime. It has to give way". Hasselmann expressed full support for the anti-corruption measures proposed by the Federal Public Ministry.

In March 2017, she participated as one of the leaders of the demonstrations in Copacabana, southern zone of Rio de Janeiro, in support of Police Operation "Car Wash" carried out by the Federal Police of Brazil, and to require the end of the guarantees and special privileges that the Brazilian Parliament politicians have when they are sued, called "Fórum Especial" in Brazil. Prior to this protest, Hasselmann recorded several videos in defense of the Police's operation, the judge Sergio Moro and the Federal Police. In July 2016, she published a book about Moro and Operation "Car Wash".

In August 2017, Hasselmann was invited by Jane Silva, president of the International Community Brazil & Israel, to attend a cultural and diplomatic event in Jerusalem. At the event, Hasselmann spoke on behalf of the Brazilian people, asking the Israeli authorities for forgiveness for the aggression that the Brazilian government made against Israel at UNESCO. In Jerusalem she said that "Brazil is for Israel, no one can tear the Bible" ("O Brasil é por Israel, ninguém pode rasgar a Bíblia") and delivered a Brazilian flag in a symbolic act, receiving in return a flag of Israel from the authorities. On the same occasion, Hasselmann delivered a document signed by the International Community Brazil & Israel, showing the support of the Brazilian people and recognizing the sovereignty of the Israelis over Jerusalem, referring to the city as their "eternal capital".

== Publications ==
- Hasselmann, Joice (2016). Sérgio Moro: a história do homem por trás da operação que mudou o Brasil (in Portuguese). Universo dos Livros. ISBN 9788550300214.
- Hasselmann, Joice (2017). Delatores: a ascensão e a queda dos investigados na Lava Jato (in Portuguese). Universo dos Livros. ISBN 9788550301983.

Brazilian National Congress
Preceded by André Moura	National Congress Government Leader; 2019	Succeeded by Eduardo Gomes
Chamber of Deputies (Brazil)
Preceded by Eduardo Bolsonaro	Chamber PSL Leader; 2020	Succeeded by Felipe Francischini
Party political offices
New political party	PSL nominee for Mayor of São Paulo; 2020	Party extinct
