= Andrea Matarazzo =

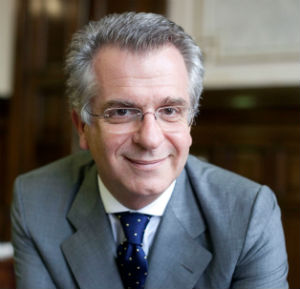

City Councillor of São Paulo
- In office January 1, 2013 – January 1, 2017

State Secretary of Culture of São Paulo
- In office May 1, 2010 – April 3, 2012
- Governor: Alberto Goldman; Geraldo Alckmin
- Preceded by: João Sayad
- Succeeded by: Marcelo Mattos Araujo

Sub-Mayor of Subprefecture of Sé
- In office 2005–2009
- Mayor: José Serra; Gilberto Kassab

Municipal Secretary of Coordination of Subprefectures of São Paulo
- In office April 3, 2006 – September 2, 2009
- Mayor: Gilberto Kassab
- Preceded by: Walter Meyer Feldman
- Succeeded by: Ronaldo Camargo

Ambassador of Brazil to Italy
- In office November 13, 2001 – December 16, 2002
- President: Fernando Henrique Cardoso
- Preceded by: Paulo Tarso Flecha de Lima
- Succeeded by: Itamar Franco

Government Secretary of Communication
- In office January 1, 1999 – December 11, 2001
- President: Fernando Henrique Cardoso
- Preceded by: Sérgio Silva do Amaral
- Succeeded by: João Roberto Vieira da Costa

Personal details
- Born: Angelo Andrea Matarazzo; 22 November 1956 (age 69) São Paulo, São Paulo, Brazil
- Party: PSD (2016–present)
- Other political affiliations: PD–IDP (2022–present); PSDB (1991–2016)
- Relatives: Francesco Matarazzo (grand-uncle); Ciccillo Matarazzo (uncle); Claudia Matarazzo (sister)

Angelo Andrea Matarazzo (born 22 November 1956) is a Brazilian entrepreneur, radio host and politician, member of the Social Democratic Party (PSD). He is grandson of Andrea Matarazzo, grand-nephew of Count Francesco Matarazzo, nephew of Ciccillo Matarazzo and brother of the etiquette and behavior journalist Claudia Matarazzo.

== Biography ==
From 1991 to 1992, he was special assistant of the Ministry of Education and Culture. After that, he was Secretary of Industrial Politics of the Ministry of Industry, Trade and Tourism between 1992 and 1993. During Mário Covas administration in São Paulo, he became State Secretary of Energy and president of São Paulo Energetic Company.

Matarazzo was Secretary of Industrial Politics during the government of Itamar Franco, Secretary of Communication of Government of the Presidency of the Republic (1999–2001) and Brazilian Ambassador to Italy (2001–2003) in the government of Fernando Henrique Cardoso.

After FHC presidency, Matarazzo was Sub-Mayor of the Subprefecture of the São Paulo district of Sé, Municipal Secretary of Coordination of Subprefectures, during the administration of Mayors José Serra and Gilberto Kassab, and State Secretary of Culture of Governors Alberto Goldman and Geraldo Alckmin.

In the 2012 election, Matarazzo was the second most voted City Councillor in Brazil with 117,617.

He left PSDB on 18 March 2016, two days before the party primaries to elect the candidate for Mayor of São Paulo in 2016.

On 30 March 2016, Matarazzo joined the Social Democratic Party (PSD), as pre-candidate for Mayor. After the party convention in July, Matarazzo was confirmed as candidate for Vice Mayor with Marta Suplicy.

Matarazzo was a candidate for Mayor of São Paulo in the 2020 election.

In August 2022, Matarazzo announced his candidacy for the Italian Senate, representing the South American ovearsea constituency, running as a member of the Italian Socialist Party.

Diplomatic posts
Preceded by Paulo Tarso Flecha de Lima	Brazilian Ambassador to Italy; 2001–2003	Succeeded by Itamar Franco
Political offices
Preceded by Sérgio Amaral	Special Secretary of Social Communication; 1999–2001	Succeeded by João Roberto Vieira da Costa
Preceded by Walter Meyer Feldman	Municipal Secretary of Coordination of Prefectures of São Paulo; 2006–2009	Succeeded by Ronaldo Camargo
Preceded by João Sayad	State Secretary of Culture of São Paulo; 2010–2012	Succeeded by Marcelo Mattos Araújo
Party political offices
New political party	PSD nominee for Vice Mayor of São Paulo; 2016	Succeeded by Marta Costa
New political party	PSD nominee for Mayor of São Paulo; 2020	Most recent
