= Yandra Moura =

Brazilian politician (born 1994)

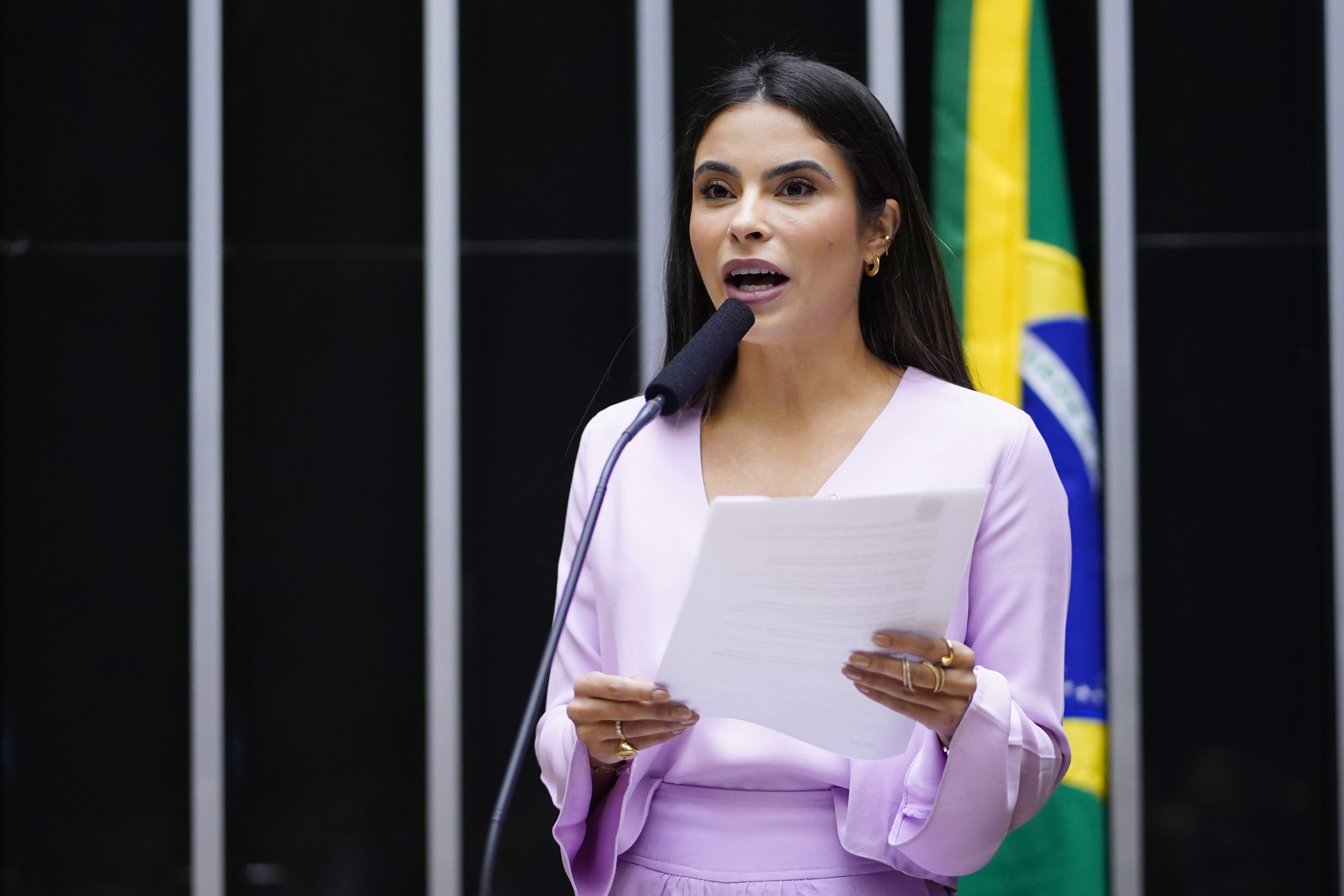
- Moura in 2023

Member of the Chamber of Deputies
- Incumbent
- Assumed office 1 February 2023
- Constituency: Sergipe

Personal details
- Born: Yandra Barreto Ferreira; 25 April 1994 (age 32) Aracaju, Sergipe, Brazil
- Party: UNIÃO (since 2022)
- Parent: André Moura (father)

Yandra Barreto Ferreira (born 25 April 1994), also known as Yandra Moura, is a Brazilian politician serving as a member of the Chamber of Deputies since 2023. She is the daughter of André Moura.
