= Marina Helou =

Brazilian politician (born 1987)

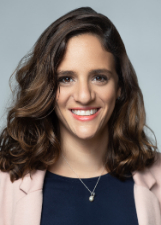
- Helou in 2020

Member of the Legislative Assembly of São Paulo
- Incumbent
- Assumed office 15 March 2019

Personal details
- Born: 25 August 1987 (age 39)
- Party: PSB (since 2026)
- Other political affiliations: Sustainability Network (2015-2026)

Marina Helou (born 25 August 1987) is a Brazilian politician serving as a member of the Legislative Assembly of São Paulo since 2019. She was a candidate for mayor of São Paulo in the 2020 mayoral election.
