= João Sayad =

Brazilian economist and professor (1945–2021)

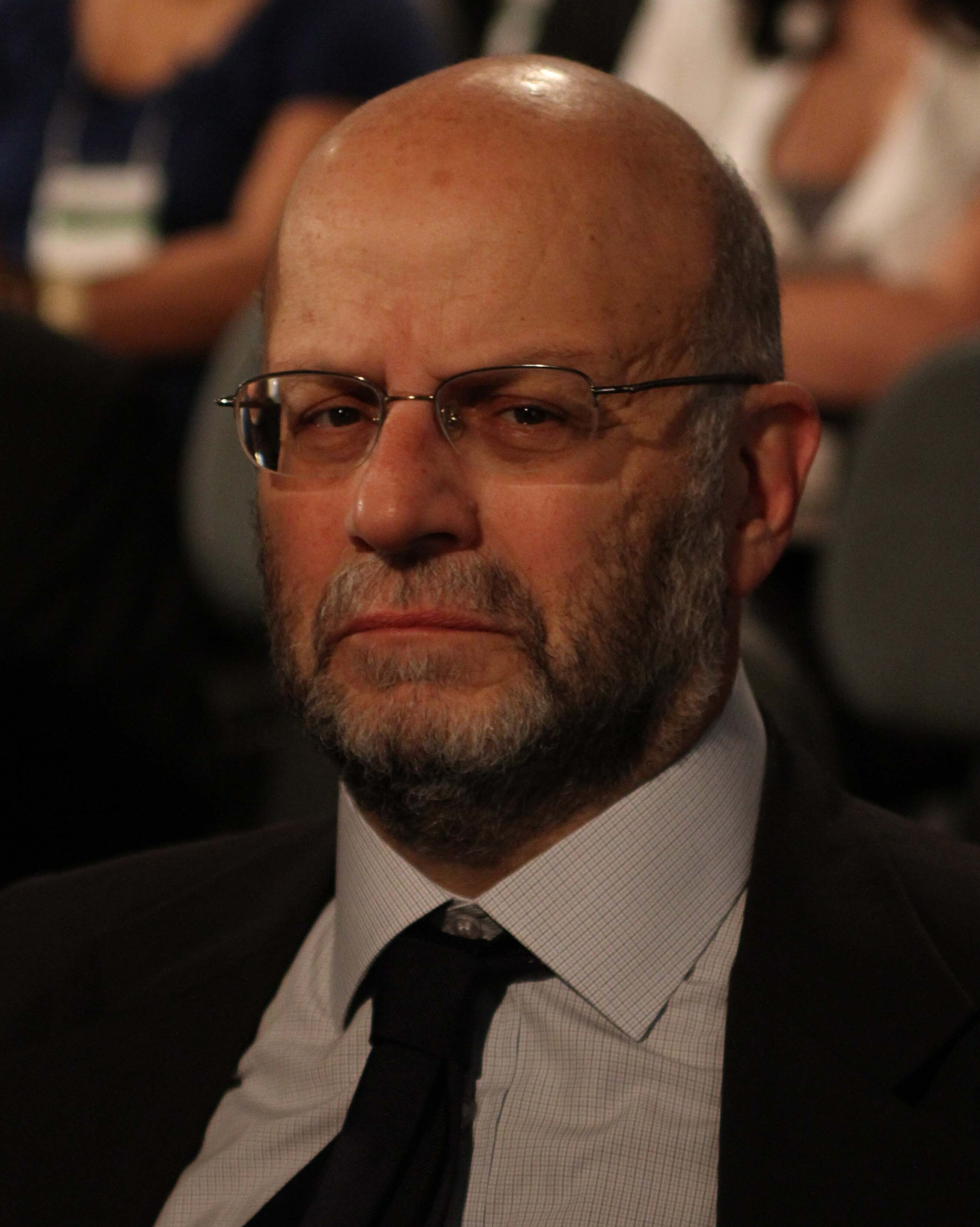
- Born: 1 December 1945
- Died: 5 September 2021 (aged 75); São Paulo, Brazil
- Spouse: Cosette Alves

Academic background
- Education: University of São Paulo, Yale University

João Sayad (1 December 1945 – 5 September 2021) was a Brazilian economist, professor of the Department of Economics, Management and Accounting of the University of São Paulo and a Secretary of Finance for the state of São Paulo. He was awarded a PhD in economics by Yale University in New Haven, Connecticut. Sayad was also once president and chairman of the board of directors of the Inter-American Development Bank in São Paulo and director of the Economic Research Institute Foundation at the University of São Paulo.

== Political views ==
Sayad was described by the Brazilian magazine Época in an interview as an academic who holds eclectic views on politics and economics. He is known for his analyzing of the economic dispute between the Keynesians and the Monetarists, allegedly not taking a specific bias toward either side. Sayad had many times discussed and commented on the political crisis surrounding Dilma Rousseff and the Workers' Party, along with its impact on the economy of the country. He was described as a "skeptical" in regards to the promises alleged by the Brazilian government and its capacity to manage the state of the economy.

== Bibliography ==
- João Sayad (12 June 2015). Dinheiro, dinheiro: Inflação, desemprego, crises financeiras e bancos. Portfolio-Penguin. ISBN 978-85-438-0374-6.
- Joao Sayad; Leandro Sarai; Danilo Dias Ticami. Revoluçao Das Moedas Digitais, A - Bitcoins E. Editora Revoar. ISBN 978-85-926450-0-7.
- "Most widely held works by João Sayad". WorldCat.
