= André Moura =

Brazilian politician (born 1972)

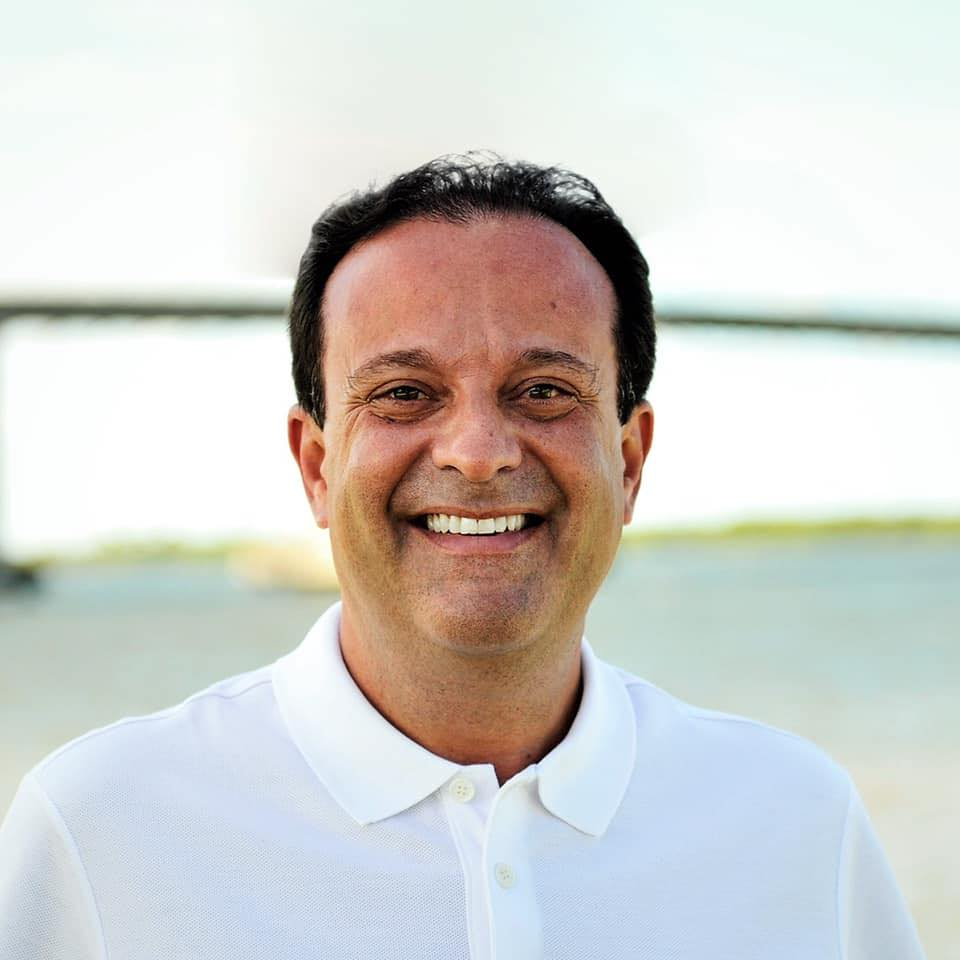
- Moura in 2021

Member of the Chamber of Deputies
- In office 1 February 2011 – 31 January 2019
- Constituency: Sergipe

Personal details
- Born: 23 February 1972 (age 54)
- Party: Brazil Union (since 2022)
- Children: Yandra Moura

André Luis Dantas Ferreira, better known as André Moura (born 23 February 1972), is a Brazilian politician serving as secretary of government of Rio de Janeiro since 2024. From 2011 to 2019, he was a member of the Chamber of Deputies.
