= Águas da Prata =

- Municipality
- Municipality of Águas da Prata
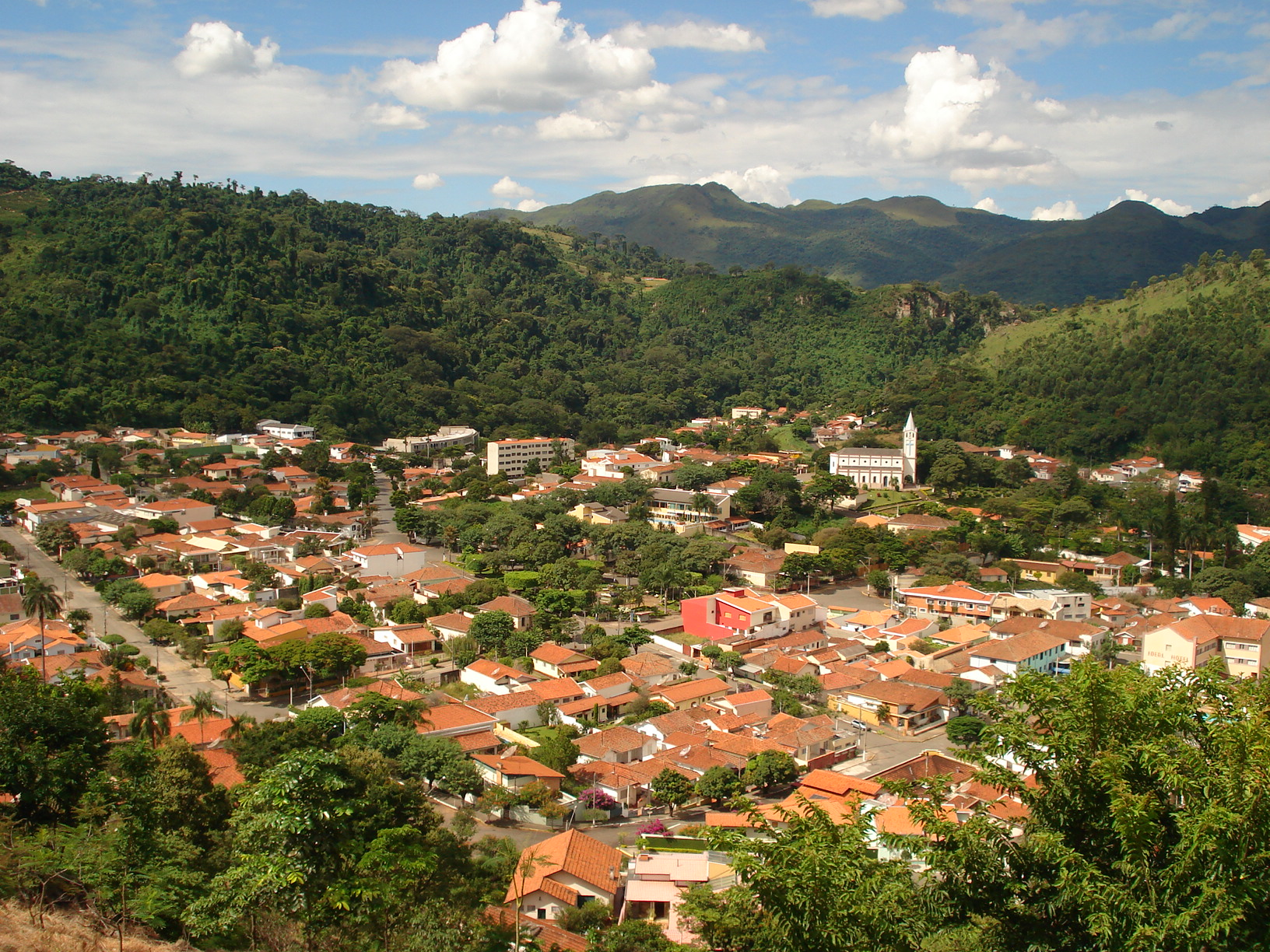

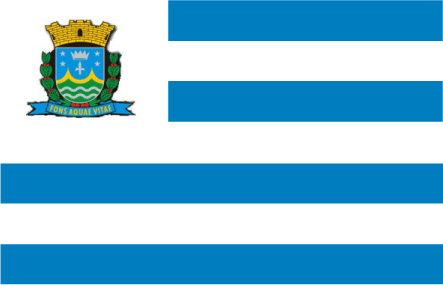
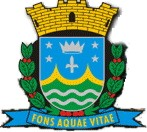
- Flag Coat of arms

- Location in São Paulo

- Location in Brazil
- Coordinates: 21°56′29″S 46°43′0″W
- Country: Brazil
- Region: Southeast
- State: São Paulo

Area
  - Total: 143 km^{2} (55 sq mi)

Population (2020)
  - Total: 8,221
  - Density: 57.5/km^{2} (149/sq mi)
- Time zone: UTC−3 (BRT)
- HDI (2010): 0.781 – high

Águas da Prata is a Brazilian municipality in the state of São Paulo. As of 2020, it had an estimated population of 8,221 in an area of 143 km^{2} (55 sq mi).

== Demographics ==
Historical population (municipality)
Year	Population	%±
1940	5,490	—
1950	5,882	7.1%
1960	6,753	14.8%
1970	5,876	−13.0%
1980	5,717	−2.7%
1991	6,692	17.1%
2000	7,131	6.6%
2010	7,584	6.4%
2022	7,369	−2.8%

== Media ==
In telecommunications, the city was served by Companhia Telefônica Brasileira until 1973, when it began to be served by Telecomunicações de São Paulo. In July 1998, this company was acquired by Telefónica, which adopted the Vivo brand in 2012.

The company is currently an operator of cell phones, fixed lines, internet (fiber optics/4G) and television (satellite and cable).

== See also ==
- List of municipalities in São Paulo
- Interior of São Paulo
