= Carlos Zarattini =

Brazilian politician (born 1959)

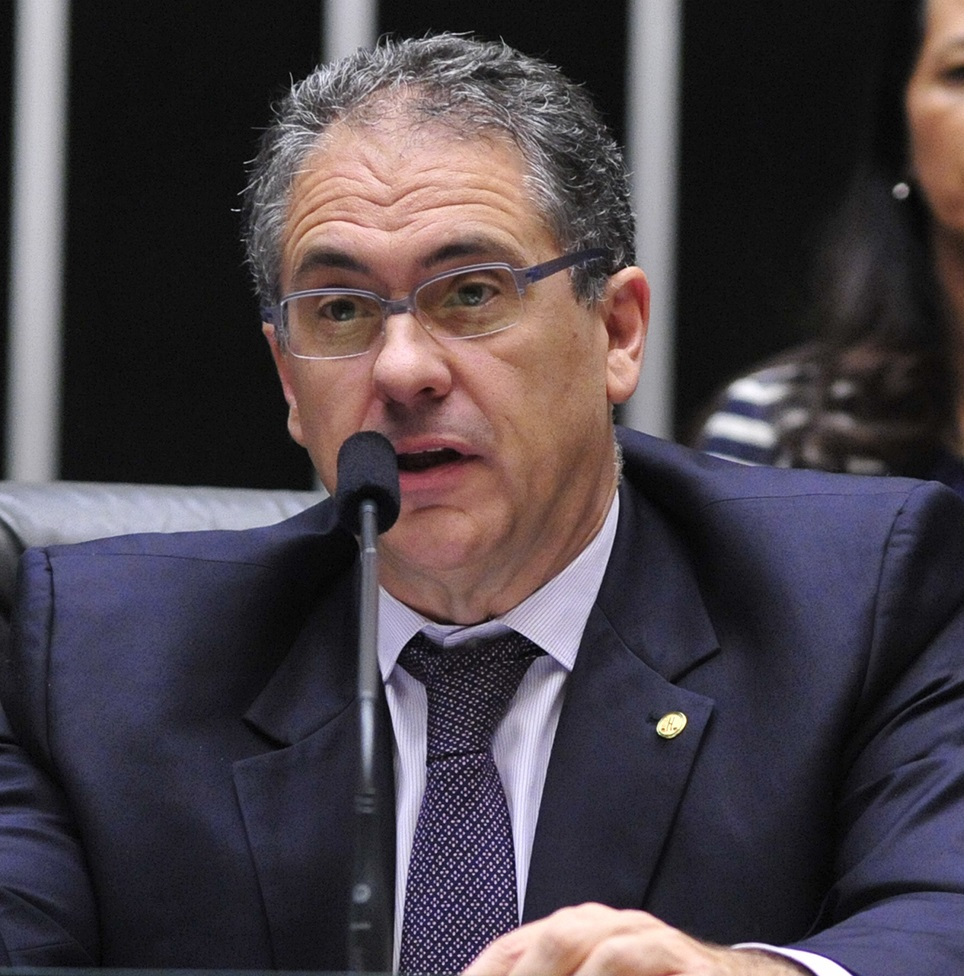
- Zarattini in 2016

Member of the Chamber of Deputies
- Incumbent
- Assumed office 1 February 2007
- Constituency: São Paulo

Member of the Legislative Assembly of São Paulo
- In office 15 March 1999 – 15 March 2003
- Constituency: At-large

Personal details
- Born: Carlos Alberto Rolim Zarattini; 8 June 1959 (age 67) São Paulo, Brazil
- Party: PT (since 1987)
- Other political affiliations: PMDB (1982–1985); PCB (1985–1987)
- Relatives: Luna Zarattini (niece)
- Education: University of São Paulo
- Profession: Economist

Carlos Alberto Rolim Zarattini (born 8 June 1959) is a Brazilian politician serving as a member of the Chamber of Deputies since 2007. He is the son of Ricardo Zarattini and the nephew of Carlos Zara.
