= Corbélia =

Coordinates: 24°48′S 53°18′W

Corbélha
- Municipality
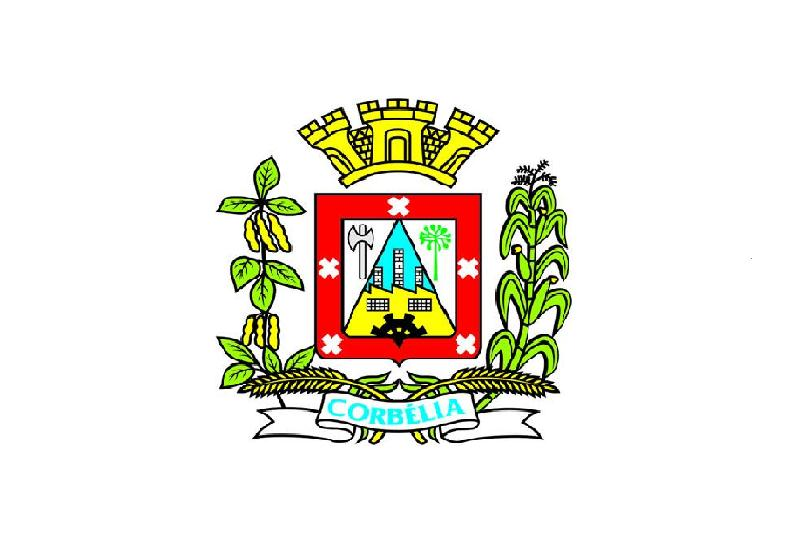
- Flag
- Interactive map of Corbélha
- Country: Brazil
- Region: Southern
- State: Paraná
- Mesoregion: Oeste Paranaense

Population (2020)
  - Total: 17,117
- Time zone: UTC−3 (BRT)

Corbélia is a municipality in the state of Paraná in the Southern Region of Brazil.

== See also ==
- List of municipalities in Paraná
