= Municipal Chamber of São Paulo =

Unicameral legislative body of São Paulo

Coordinates: 23.5508°S 46.6411°W

Municipal Chamber of São Paulo Câmara Municipal de São Paulo
- 19th Legislature
- Coat of arms of the city of São Paulo

Type
- Type: Unicameral
- Term limits: None

History
- Founded: 1560
- New session started: 1 January 2025

Leadership
- President: Ricardo Teixeira, UNIÃO since 1 January 2025
- Government Leader: Vacant

Structure
- Seats: 55
- Political groups: Government and allies (39) (Note: There is no formalized division between government support and opposition, but informally only PT and PSOL have been allotted time as opposition to discuss any proposal, while all other parties are counted as arguing for the government support base.) MDB (7) PL (7) UNIÃO (7) PODE (6) PP (4) PSD (3) PSB (2) Republicanos (2) NOVO (1) Opposition (16) FE Brasil (9): PT (8); PV (1); PSOL REDE (7): PSOL (6); REDE (1)
- Length of term: Four years

Elections
- Voting system: Open list proportional representation D'Hondt method
- Last election: 6 October 2024
- Next election: 1 October 2028

Meeting place
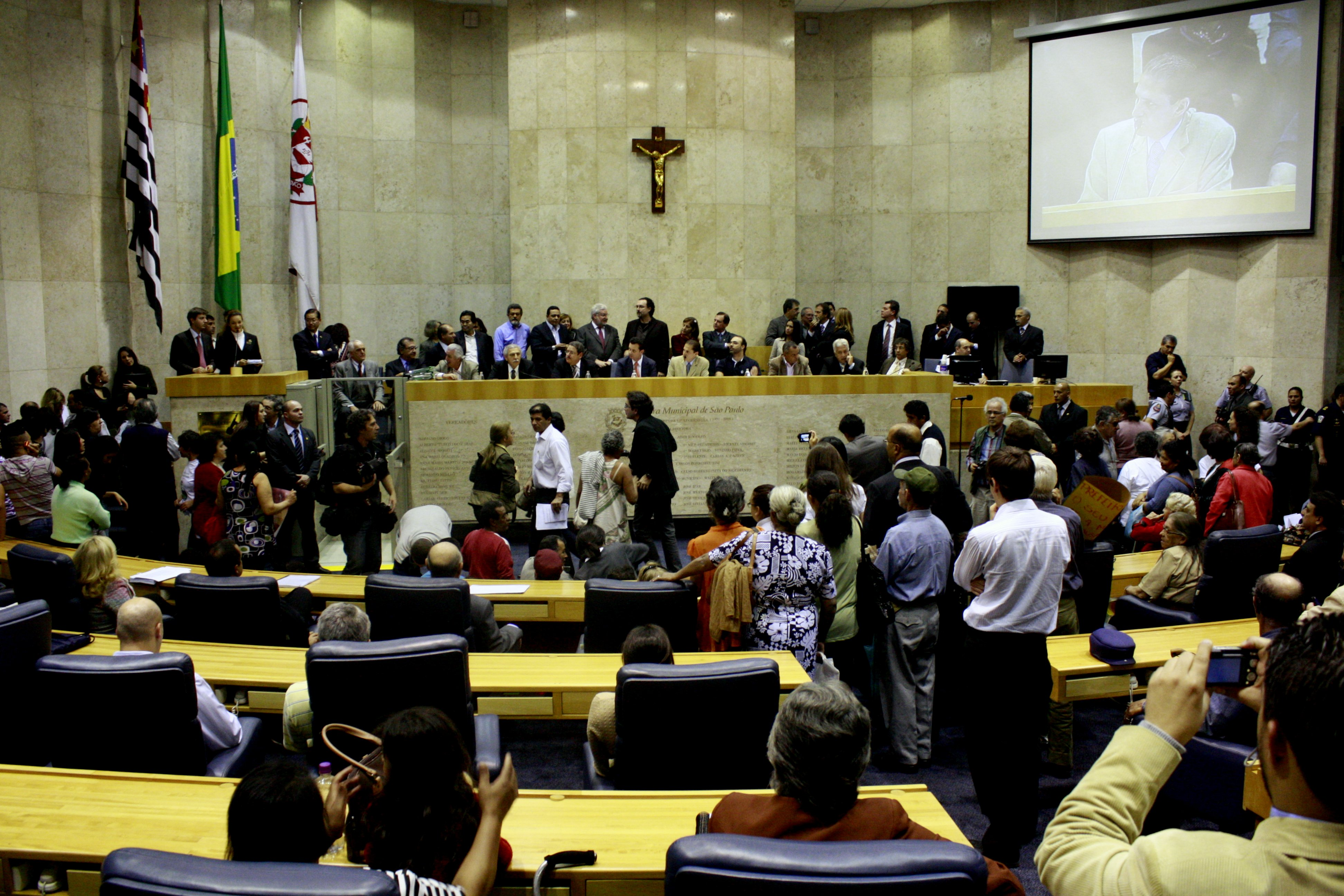
- Anchieta Palace; São Paulo, Brazil

Website
- www.saopaulo.sp.leg.br

The Municipal Chamber of São Paulo is the unicameral legislative body of the city of São Paulo, it was created in 1560 by the Governor General Mem de Sá and is one of the oldest in Brazil.
