= 2018 São Paulo gubernatorial election =

Brazilian gubernatorial election

2018 São Paulo state election
- 7 October 2018 (first round); 28 October 2018 (second round)
- Opinion polls
- Gubernatorial election
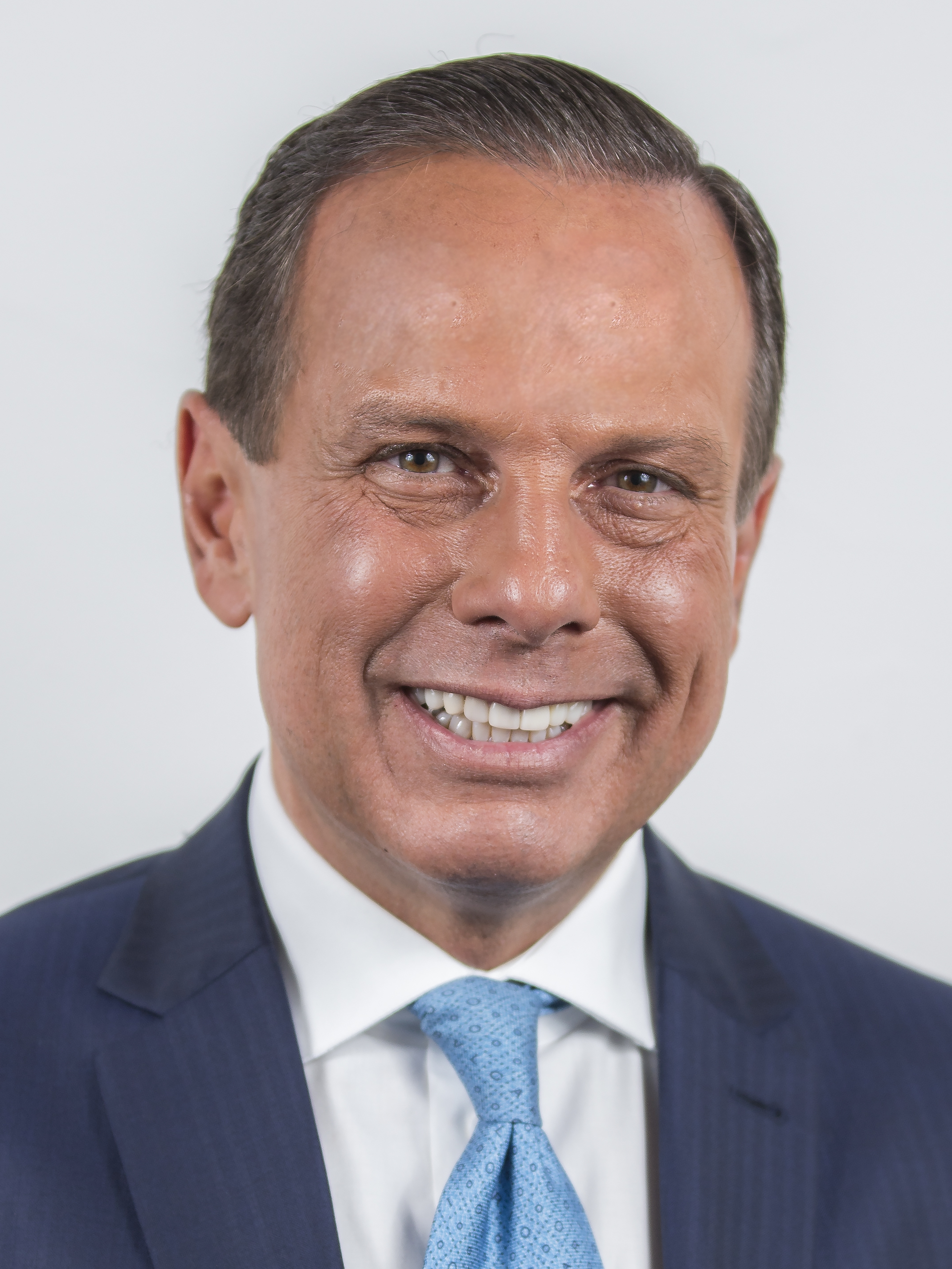

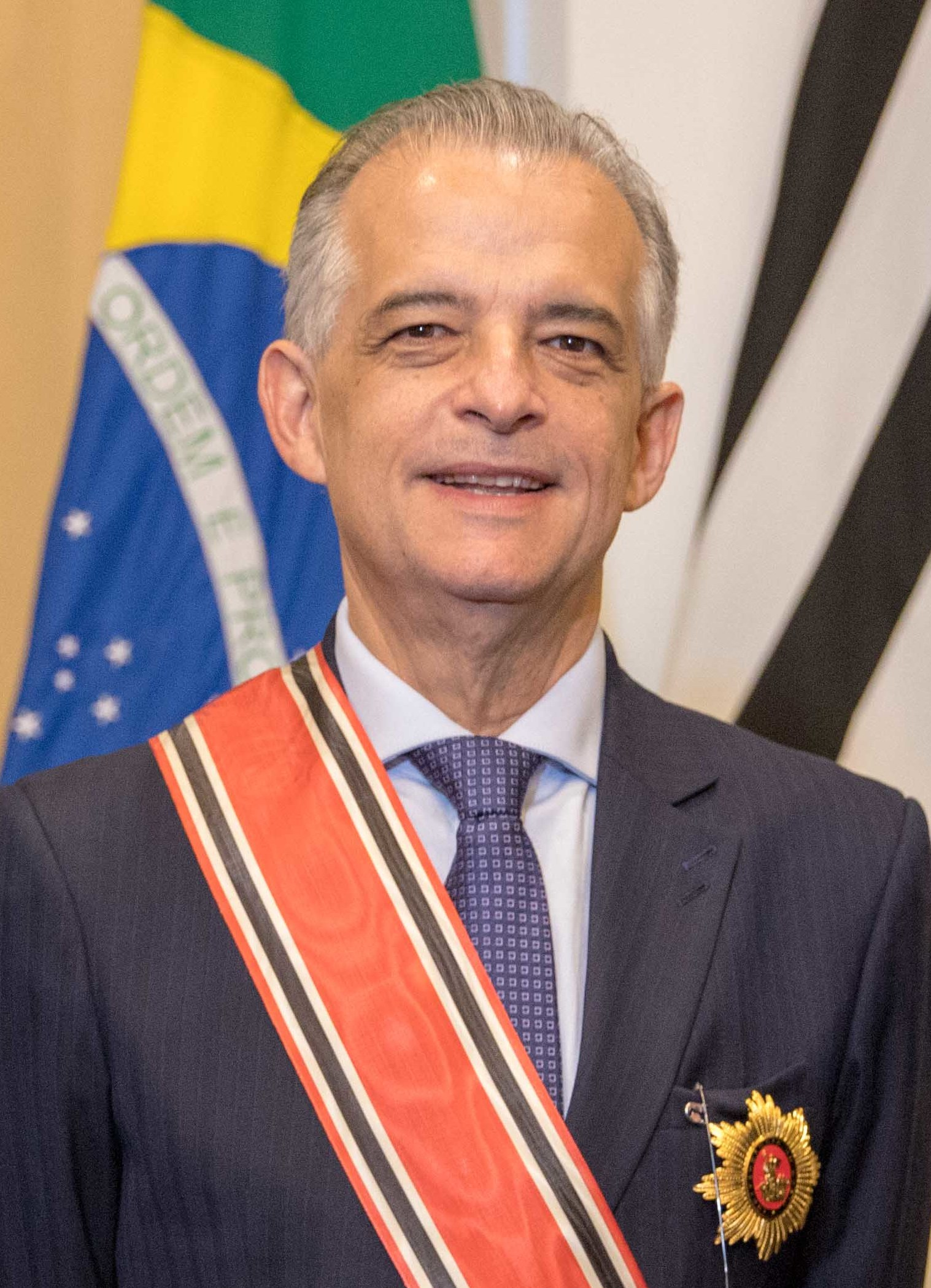
Candidate	João Doria	Márcio França
Party	PSDB	PSB
Alliance	Speed Up SP	São Paulo Trust and Advance
Running mate	Rodrigo Garcia	Eliane Nikoluk
Popular vote	10,990,160	10,248,653
Percentage	51.75%	48.25%
- Candidate with the most votes per municipality in the 2nd round (645): João Doria (392 municipalities); Márcio França (253 municipalities)
Governor before election
Márcio França
PSB
Elected Governor
João Doria
PSDB
- Parliamentary election
Party	Leader	Vote %	Seats	+/–
Legislative Assembly
PSL	None	19.31%	15	+14
PSDB	Cassio Navarro	9.61%	8	−14
PT	Beth Sahão	9.31%	10	−4
PSB	Caio França	6.09%	8	+2
DEM	Rogério Nogueira	5.90%	7	−1
PR	André do Prado	5.74%	6	+3
PSOL	Carlos Giannazi	4.35%	4	+2
PODE	Pedro Kaká	4.19%	4	+3
PP	Delegado Olim	4.09%	4	+2
Republicanos	Gilmaci Santos	3.57%	6	−2
MDB	Itamar Borges	2.87%	3	+1
PSD	Marta Costa	2.68%	2	−2
PV	Reinaldo Alguz	2.25%	1	−2
Patriota	Paulo Corrêa Jr.	1.51%	1	−2
PROS	Gileno Gomes	1.49%	1	+1
PCdoB	Leci Brandão	1.18%	1	−1
This lists parties that won seats. See the complete results below.
- Senatorial election
- 7 October 2018 (one-only round)
- Opinion polls
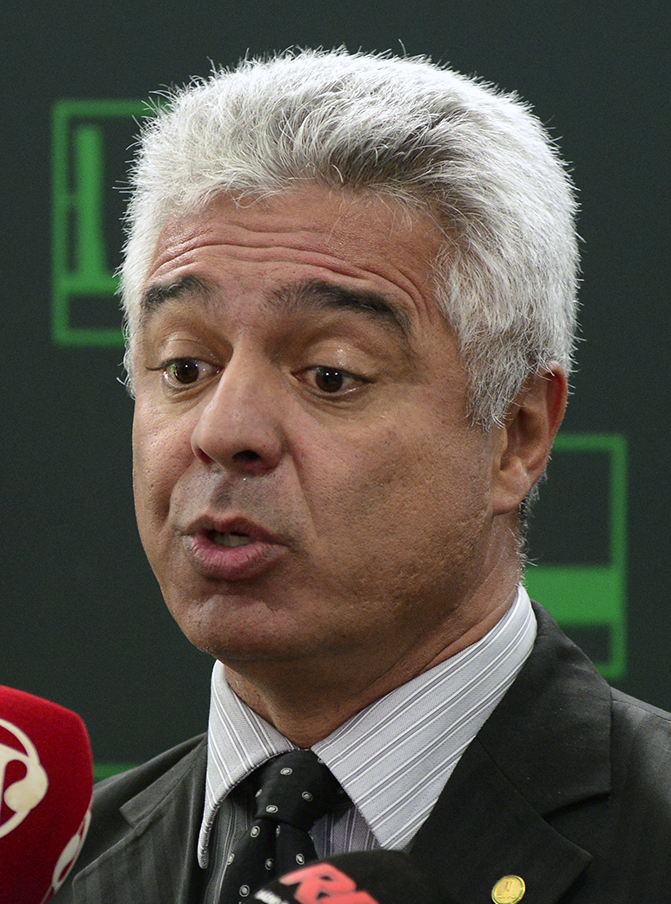

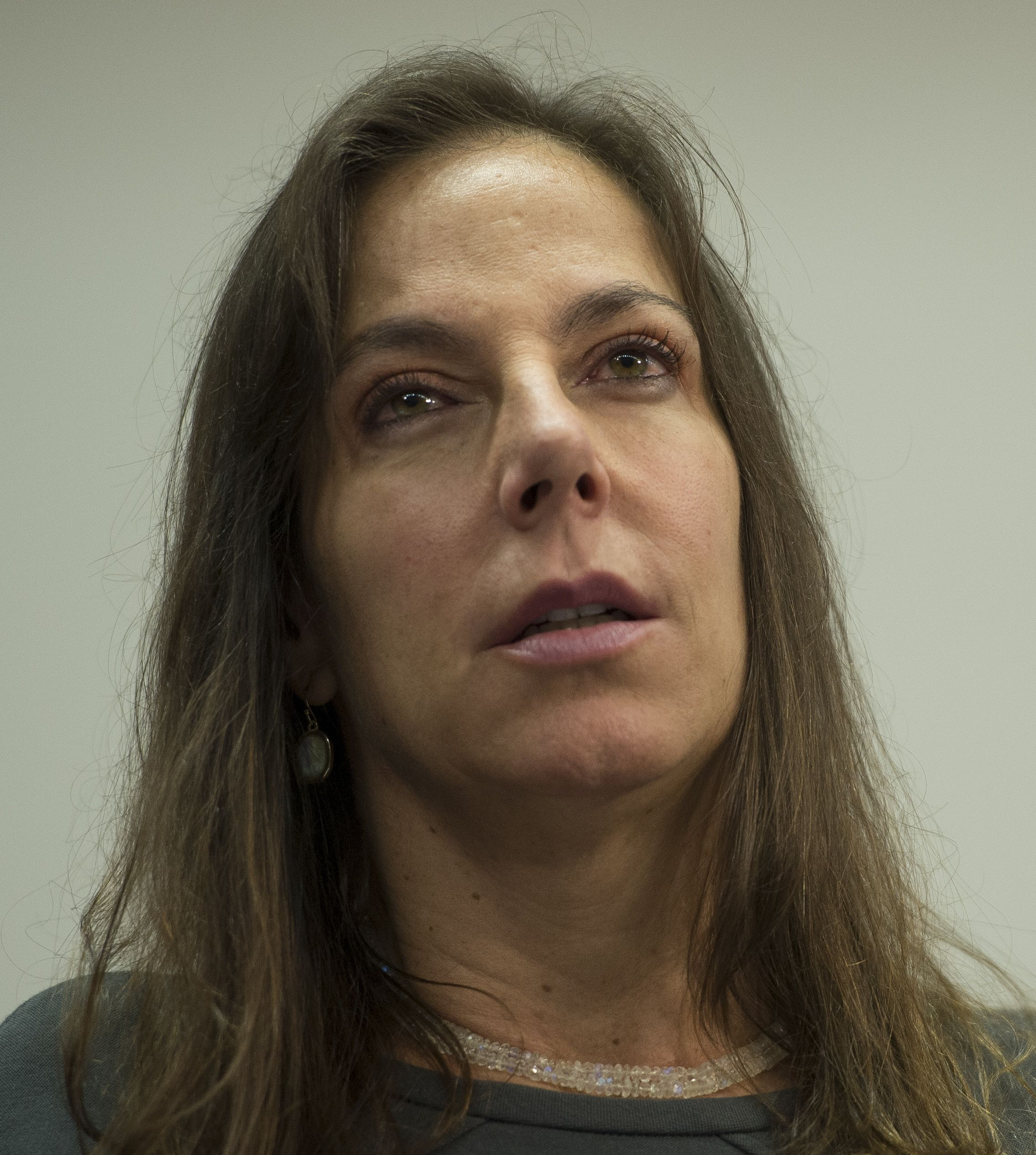

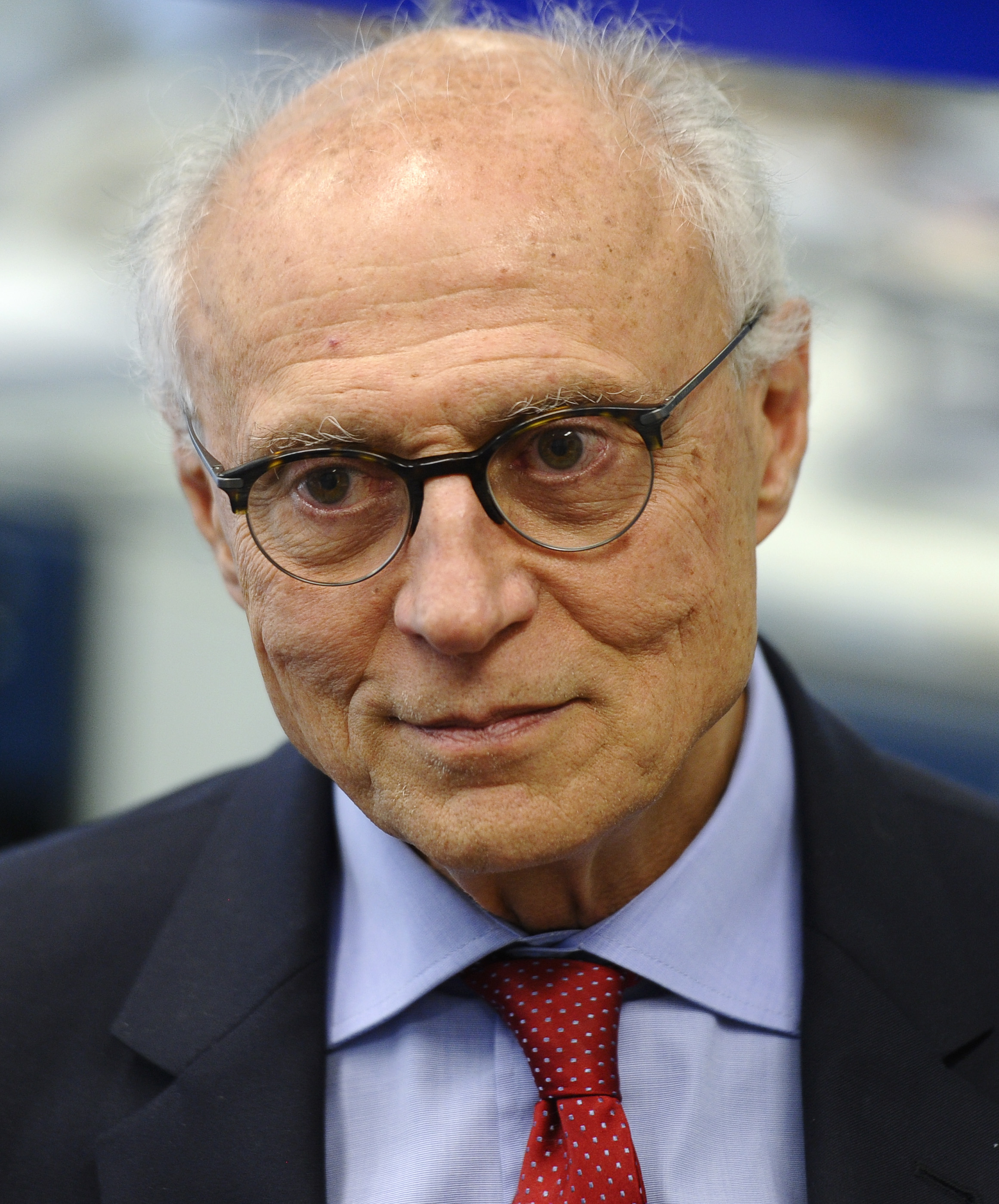
Candidate	Major Olímpio	Mara Gabrilli	Eduardo Suplicy
Party	PSL	PSDB	PT
Alliance	São Paulo Above Everything, God Above Everyone	Speed Up SP	São Paulo of Work and Opportunities
Popular vote	9,039,717	6,513,282	4,667,565
Percentage	25.81%	18.59%	13.32%
- Candidate with the most votes per municipality (645): Major Olímpio (531 municipalities); Mara Gabrilli (90 municipalities); Eduardo Suplicy (23 municipalities); Mário Covas Neto (1 municipality)
Senators before election
Aloysio Nunes and Marta Suplicy
PSDB and Ind.
Elected Senators
Major Olímpio and Mara Gabrilli
PSL and PSDB

The 2018 São Paulo gubernatorial election occurred on 7 October 2018 and 28 October 2018. Voters elected a Governor, Vice Governor, 2 Senators, 70 representatives for the Chamber of Deputies, and 94 Legislative Assembly members. The former governor, Márcio França, affiliated to the Brazilian Socialist Party (PSB) took office with the resignation of Geraldo Alckmin on 6 April 2018, and was eligible for a second term and ran for reelection.

The previous gubernatorial election in the state was held in October 2014, in which Geraldo Alckmin of the Brazilian Social Democracy Party was re-elected in the first round with 57.31% of the vote, against 21.53% of Paulo Skaf and 18.22% of Alexandre Padilha.

In the gubernatorial election, the businessman and the former Mayor of São Paulo, João Doria, won the first round at first place with 31.77% of the vote, qualifying for a second round against Márcio França, governor of São Paulo, who got 21.53% of the vote. As the first place did not reach more than 50% of the votes, a second round was held on 28 October 2018.

By a narrow lead of just over 700,000 votes, Doria was elected governor with 51.75% of the vote, and França was defeated with 48.25%.

For the Federal Senate election, federal deputies Major Olímpio (PSL) and Mara Gabrilli (PSDB) were elected to the seats that were once occupied by Aloysio Nunes and Marta Suplicy. They had, respectively, 25.81% and 18.59% of the vote. Eduardo Suplicy (PT), who was councillor of São Paulo at the time, came in third with 13.32% of the vote, and federal deputy Ricardo Tripoli (PSDB) in fourth with 9.00% of the vote.

== Gubernatorial candidates ==
=== Announced candidacies ===
- João Doria (PSDB) – The Brazilian Social Democracy Party decided to announce the candidacy of the former São Paulo's mayor (2017–18), João Doria, who won the party's state primaries, defeating the candidates José Anibal and Floriano Pesaro. His running mate is the federal deputy Rodrigo Garcia, affiliated to the Democrats at the time. Their gubernatorial ticket was supported by five parties: DEM, PSD, PTC, PRB and PP.
- Márcio França (PSB) – The Brazilian Socialist Party announced the candidacy of Márcio França, who ran for re-election. He was the Vice Governor of São Paulo (2015–18) and Governor of São Paulo (2018–19). França was elected as Vice Governor in 2014 São Paulo gubernatorial election and took office as Governor of São Paulo in April 2018, with the resignation of the former governor Geraldo Alckmin, who left the government of São Paulo to run for the Presidency of the Republic in 2018 Brazilian presidential election. His ticket was supported by fifteen parties: PR, PPS, PV, PPL, PHS, PSC, PROS, PMB, Solidariedade, PODE, PRP, PTB and Patriota. His running mate is the Lieutenant colonel Eliane Nikoluk, affiliated to the Party of the Republic (PR).
- Paulo Skaf (MDB) – The Brazilian Democratic Movement confirmed Paulo Skaf as a gubernatorial candidate at a convention held on July 28, 2018. Skaf is an entrepreneur, politician and was the president of the Federation of Industries of the State of São Paulo (FIESP). He already ran for the São Paulo government in 2014, when he received 4,594,708 votes and was defeated in the first round. Running in an independent ticket, his running mate is the Lieutenant colonel Carla Basson, also affiliated to the Brazilian Democratic Movement (MDB).
- Luiz Marinho (PT) – The Workers' Party had primaries in March 2018 to decide who was going to be the gubernatorial candidate. The candidates at the time were the former Mayor of São Bernardo do Campo, Luiz Marinho, and the former mayor of Guarulhos, Elói Pietá. Marinho won the party primaries on March 24, 2018, and was announced as the gubernatorial candidate. He had the support of the Communist Party of Brazil (PCdoB) and his running mate was the teacher Ana Bock, also a member of the Workers' Party.
- Claudio Fernando (PMN) – The Party of National Mobilization decided to announce the state party president and Professor, Claudio Fernando (known as Professor Claudio Fernando), as a gubernatorial candidate. He was also the former Secretary of Ports and Airports of Santos and the Secretary of Economic Development of Guarujá. It was the party's first candidacy for governor in the state of São Paulo. His candidacy had the support of Sustainability Network (REDE), and had Roberto Campos as his running mate.
- Lisete Arelaro (PSOL) – The Socialism and Liberty Party decided to announce the candidacy of the University of São Paulo's teacher, Lisete Arelaro (known as Professora Lisete). Her candidacy was supported by the Brazilian Communist Party (PCB) and her running mate was also the teacher Maurício Costa.
- Toninho Ferreira (PSTU) – The United Socialist Workers' Party announced an independent candidacy and nominated Toninho Ferreira as a gubernatorial candidate on their ticket. Toninho is a lawyer, a former metallurgist and leader of the Metalworkers Union of São José dos Campos and region. His running mate was Ariana Gonçalves, a teacher at the Municipal Education Network of São Paulo.
- Rodrigo Tavares (PRTB) – The Brazilian Labour Renewal Party announced the lawyer Rodrigo Tavares as a gubernatorial candidate on their ticket. His candidacy was supported by the Social Liberal Party. He has worked in several municipal secretariats in Guarulhos, such as Health, Government, Culture, Social Assistance and Legal Affairs. His last position was Director of the Municipal Secretary of Labor in Guarulhos. His running mate is Jairo Glikson, a lawyer affiliated to the Social Liberal Party.
- Major Costa e Silva (DC) – The Christian Democracy party announced the Major Adriano Costa e Silva as a gubernatorial candidate at a party convention on 28 July 2018. His running mate is Fátima, a Corporal of the Military Police (known as Cabo Fátima).
- Marcelo Cândido (PDT) – The party firstly announced its support for the candidacy of Márcio França, however, on 5 August 2018 the party decided to announce the former mayor of Suzano, Marcelo Cândido, as a gubernatorial candidate. His running mate is Gleides Sodré.
- Rogério Chequer (NOVO) – The New Party announced the gubernatorial candidacy of Rogério Chequer, a production engineer, businessman, political activist and one of the founders of the Movement Come To The Streets (Movimento Vem Pra Rua). His running mate is Andrea Menezes.
- Edson Dorta/Lilian Miranda (PCO) – Dorta ran in the 2016 elections as a candidate for mayor of Campinas and was chosen as the party's gubernatorial candidate in 2018 São Paulo gubernatorial election. His running mate was Lilian Miranda. However, on 11 September 2018, his candidacy was denied by the Regional Electoral Court of São Paulo (TRE/SP). Days later, on 17 September, the party registered his former running mate, Lilian Miranda, as a gubernatorial candidate.

=== Candidates in runoff ===
Party	Candidate	Most relevant political office or occupation	Party	Running mate	Coalition	Electoral number
Brazilian Socialist Party (PSB)	Márcio França (PSB)	Governor of São Paulo (2018–2019)	Party of the Republic (PR)	Eliane Nikoluk (PR)	São Paulo Trust and Advance: Brazilian Socialist Party (PSB); Party of the Republic (PR); Green Party (PV); Solidariedade; Republican Party of the Social Order (PROS); Social Christian Party (PSC); Humanist Party of Solidarity (PHS); Progressive Republican Party (PRP); Brazilian Woman's Party (PMB); Brazilian Labour Party (PTB); Podemos (PODE); Patriota	40
Brazilian Social Democracy Party (PSDB)	João Doria (PSDB)	Mayor of São Paulo (2017–2018)	Democrats (DEM)	Rodrigo Garcia (DEM)	Speed Up SP: Brazilian Social Democracy Party (PSDB); Democrats (DEM); Social Democratic Party (PSD); Progressistas (PP); Brazilian Republican Party (PRB); Christian Labour Party (PTC)	45

=== Candidates failing to make runoff ===
Party	Candidate	Most relevant political office or occupation	Party	Running mate	Coalition	Electoral number
Democratic Labour Party (PDT)	Marcelo Cândido (PDT)	Mayor of Suzano (2005–2013)	Democratic Labour Party (PDT)	Gleides Sodré (PDT)	—N/a	12
Workers' Party (PT)	Luiz Marinho (PT)	Mayor of São Bernardo do Campo (2009–2017)	Workers' Party (PT)	Ana Bock (PT)	São Paulo of Work and Opportunities: Workers' Party (PT); Communist Party of Brazil (PCdoB)	13
Brazilian Democratic Movement (MDB)	Paulo Skaf (MDB)	President of FIESP (2007–2021)	Brazilian Democratic Movement (MDB)	Carla Basson (MDB)	—N/a	15
United Socialist Workers' Party (PSTU)	Toninho Ferreira (PSTU)	Member of the Metallurgicals Union of São José dos Campos	United Socialist Workers' Party (PSTU)	Ariana Gonçalves (PSTU)	—N/a	16
Christian Democracy (DC)	Adriano Costa e Silva (DC)	Major of the Brazilian Army	Christian Democracy (DC)	Fátima de Souza (DC)	—N/a	27
Brazilian Labour Renewal Party (PRTB)	Rodrigo Tavares (PRTB)	Guarulhos Municipal Secretary	Brazilian Labour Renewal Party (PRTB)	Jairo Glikson (PRTB)	São Paulo Above Everything, God Above Everyone: Brazilian Labour Renewal Party (PRTB); Social Liberal Party (PSL)	28
Workers' Cause Party (PCO)	Lilian Miranda (PCO)	High school teacher	Workers' Cause Party (PCO)	Marcio Oliveira (PCO)	—N/a	29
New Party (NOVO)	Rogério Chequer (NOVO)	Engineer and entrepreneur	New Party (NOVO)	Andrea Menezes (NOVO)	—N/a	30
Party of National Mobilization (PMN)	Cláudio Fernando (PMN)	Santos Municipal Secretary of Ports and Airports	Sustainability Network (REDE)	Roberto Fernandes (REDE)	Sustainable Mobilization for São Paulo: Party of National Mobilization (PMN); Sustainability Network (REDE))	33
Socialism and Liberty Party (PSOL)	Lisete Arelaro (PSOL)	Senior professor at Education School of University of São Paulo	Socialism and Liberty Party (PSOL)	Maurício Costa (PSOL)	Not Afraid to Change São Paulo: Socialism and Liberty Party (PSOL); Brazilian Communist Party (PCB)	50

=== Candidacy denied ===
Party	Candidate	Most relevant political office or occupation	Party	Running mate	Coalition	Electoral number
Workers' Cause Party (PCO)	Edson Dorta (PCO)	Federal public employee	Workers' Cause Party (PCO)	Lilian Miranda (PCO)	—N/a	29

=== Declined candidates ===
- José Serra (PSDB) – Senator from São Paulo 1996–1998, 2002–2003, 2015–2016 and since 2017; Minister of Foreign Affairs 2016–2017; Governor of São Paulo 2007–2010; Mayor of São Paulo 2005–2006; president of the PSDB 2003–2005; Minister of Health 1998–2002; Minister of Planning and Budget 1995–1996; Federal Deputy from São Paulo 1987–1995; State Secretary for Economics and Planning of São Paulo 1983–1986. Candidate for Mayor of São Paulo in 1988, 1996 and 2012 and for President of Brazil in 2002 and 2010.
- Gilberto Kassab (PSD) – Minister of Science, Technology, Innovation and Communication since 2016; Minister of Cities 2015–2016; president of the PSD 2011–2015; Mayor of São Paulo 2006–2013; Vice Mayor of São Paulo 2005–2006; Federal Deputy from São Paulo 1999–2005; Municipal Secretary of Planning of São Paulo 1997–1998. Candidate for Senator from São Paulo in 2014.
- Celso Russomanno (PRB) – Federal Deputy from São Paulo 1995–2011 and since 2015. Candidate for governor in 2010 and for Mayor of São Paulo in 2012 and 2016.
- Rodrigo Garcia – State Secretary of Housing of São Paulo since 2015; Federal Deputy from São Paulo 2011 and 2014–2015; State Secretary of Social Development of São Paulo 2011–2013; Special Municipal Secretary of De-bureaucracy of São Paulo 2008–2010; State Deputy of São Paulo 1999–2008.
- Alexandre Zeitune (REDE) – Vice Mayor of Guarulhos since 2017; Municipal Secretary of Education, Culture, Sports and Leisure of Guarulhos 2017.
- Gabriel Chalita (PDT) – Municipal Secretary of Education of São Paulo 2015–2016; Federal Deputy from São Paulo 2011–2015; Alderman of São Paulo 2009–2011; State Secretary of Education of São Paulo 2003–2007. Candidate for Vice Mayor of São Paulo in 2016.
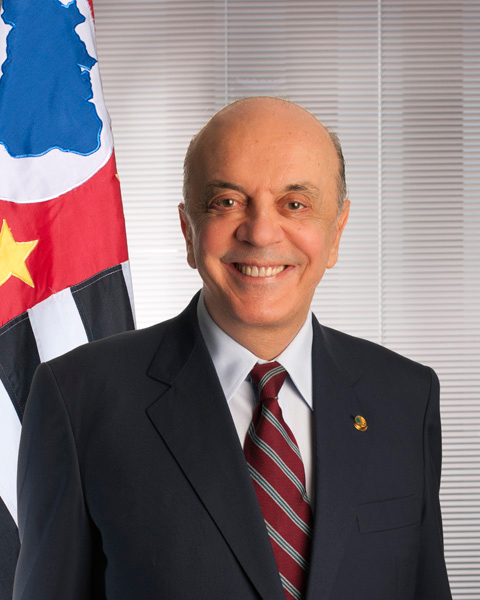
Senator
José Serra (PSDB)
from São Paulo

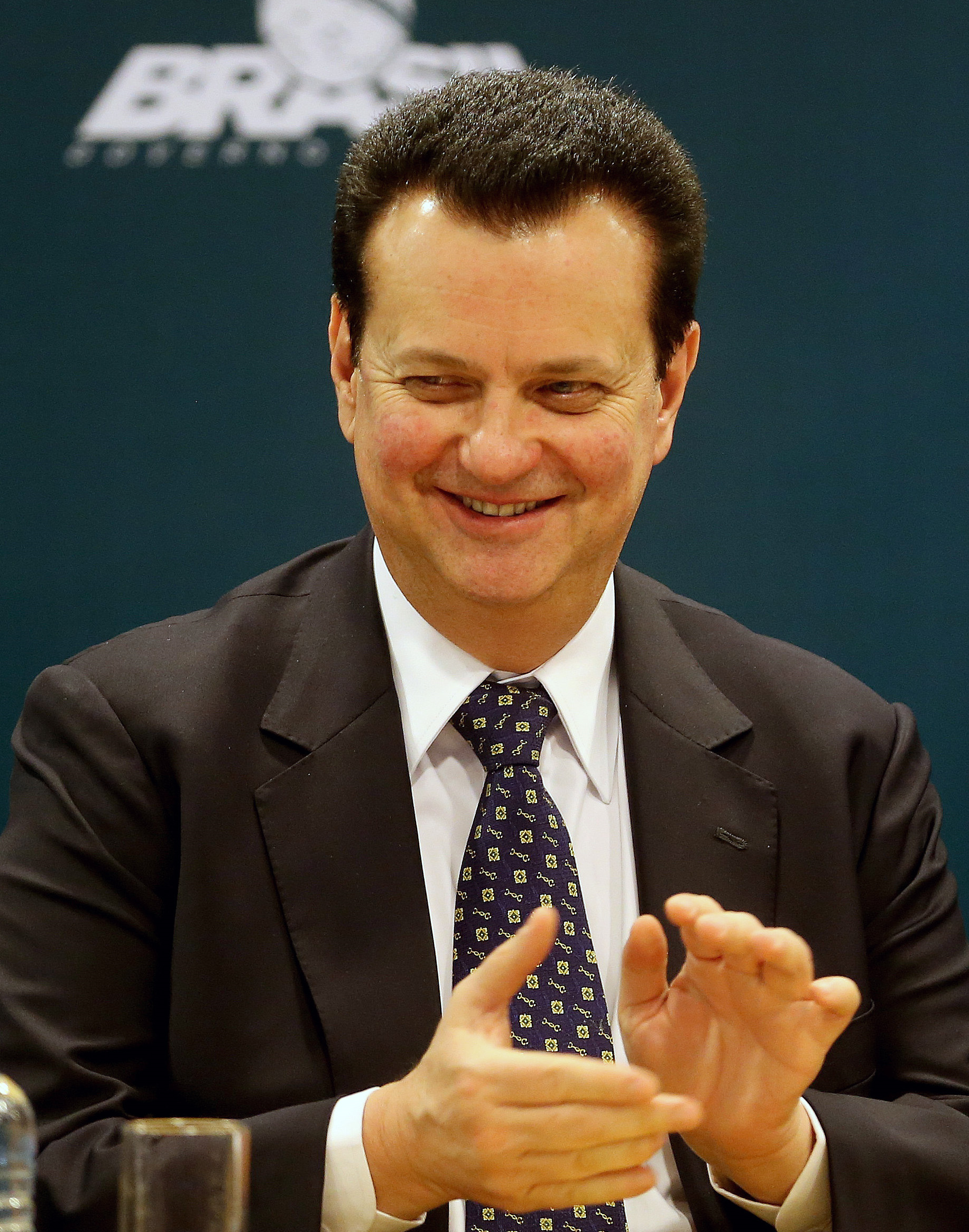
Minister of Science
Gilberto Kassab (PSD)
from São Paulo

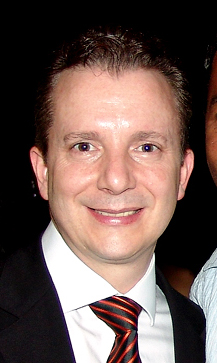
Federal Deputy
Celso Russomanno (PRB)
from São Paulo

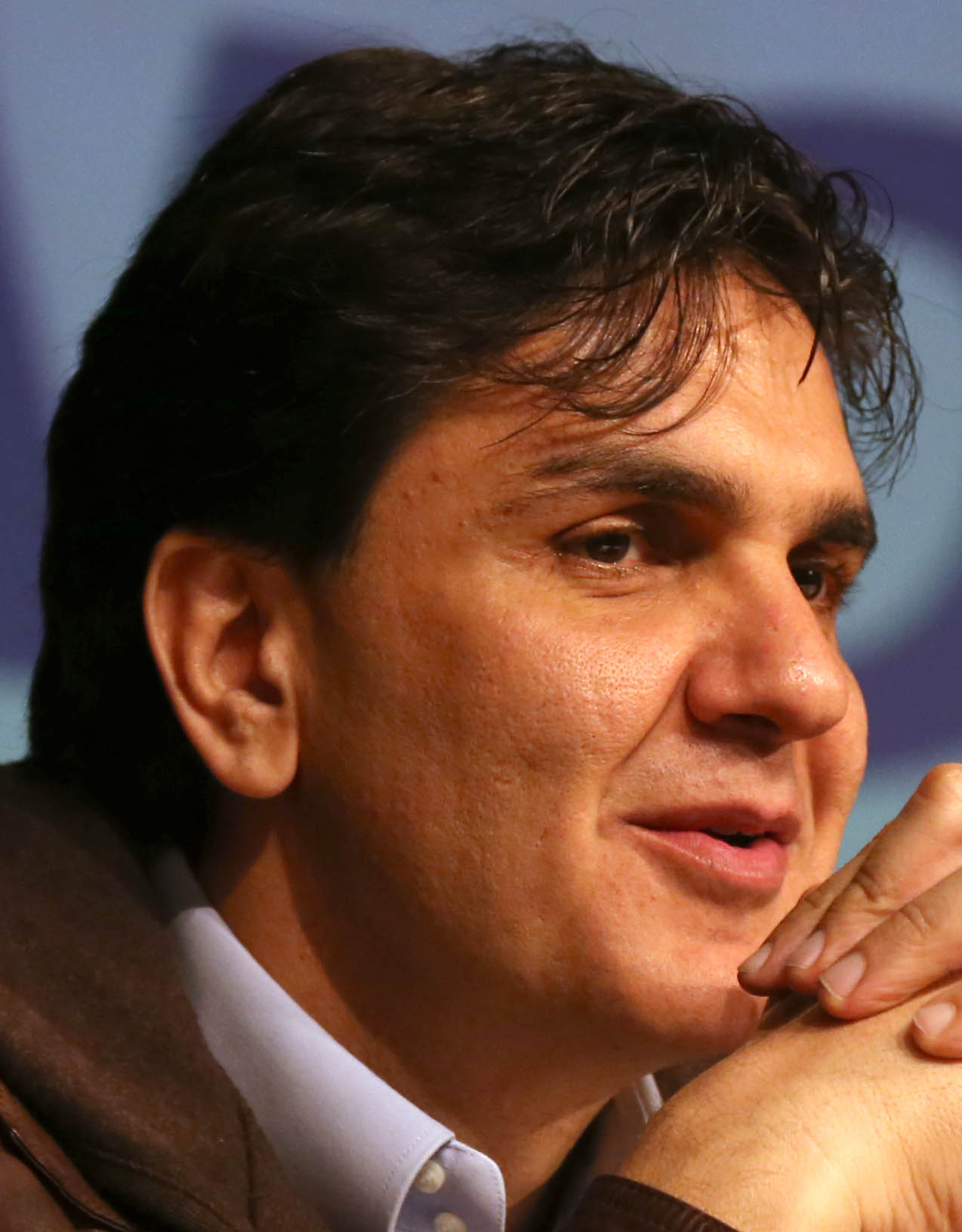
Former Municipal Secretary
Gabriel Chalita (PDT)
from São Paulo

=== Lost in convention ===
- José Aníbal (PSDB) – President of the Institute Teotônio Vilela since 2015; Senator from São Paulo 2016–2017; State Secretary of Energy of São Paulo 2011–2015; Alderman of São Paulo 2005–2006; State Secretary of Economic Development, Science, Technology and Innovation of São Paulo 1999–2001; Federal Deputy from São Paulo 1990–1999 and 2007–2011. Candidate for Senator from São Paulo in 2002.
- Luiz Felipe d'Ávila (PSDB) – political scientist, professor, speaker and coach in Public Leadership.
- Floriano Pesaro (PSDB) – State Secretary of Social Development of São Paulo since 2015; Federal Deputy from São Paulo since 2015; Alderman of São Paulo 2009–2014; Municipal Secretary of Social Assistance and Development of São Paulo 2005–2006.
- Sâmia Bomfim (PSOL) – Alderwoman of São Paulo since 2017.
- Carlos Giannazi (PSOL) – State Deputy of São Paulo since 2007; Alderman of São Paulo 2001–2007. Candidate for Mayor of São Paulo in 2012 and for Vice Mayor of São Paulo in 2008.
- Fernando Haddad (PT) – Mayor of São Paulo 2013–2017; Minister of Education 2005–2012. Candidate for Mayor of São Paulo in 2016.
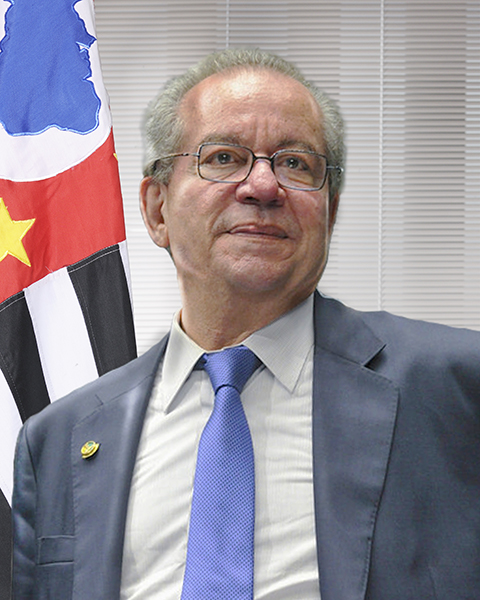
Former Senator
José Aníbal (PSDB)
from São Paulo

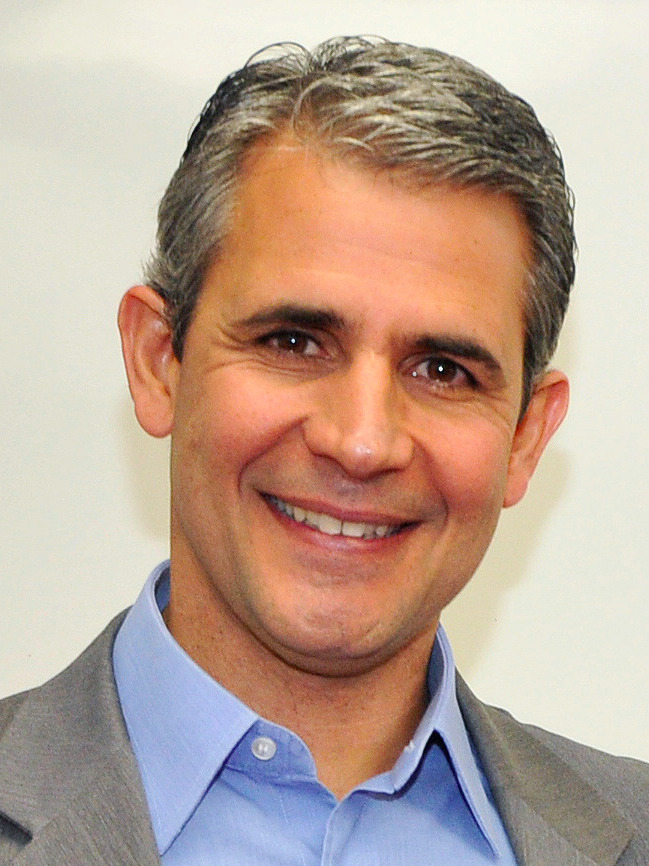
Political scientist
Luiz Felipe d'Avila (PSDB)
from São Paulo

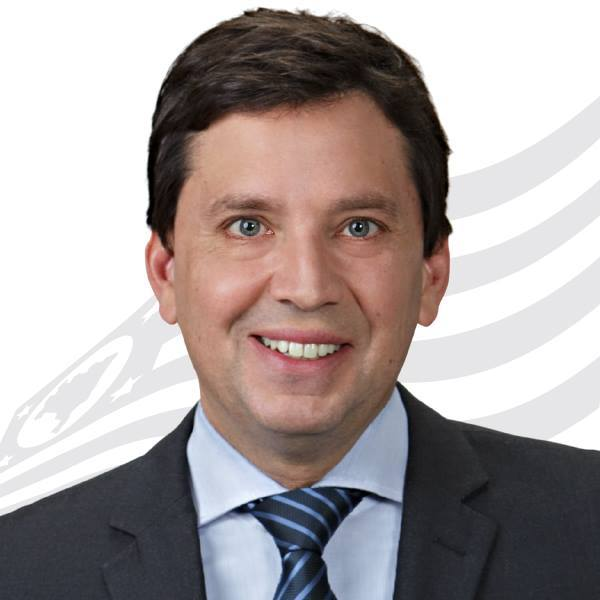
State Secretary
Floriano Pesaro (PSDB)
from São Paulo

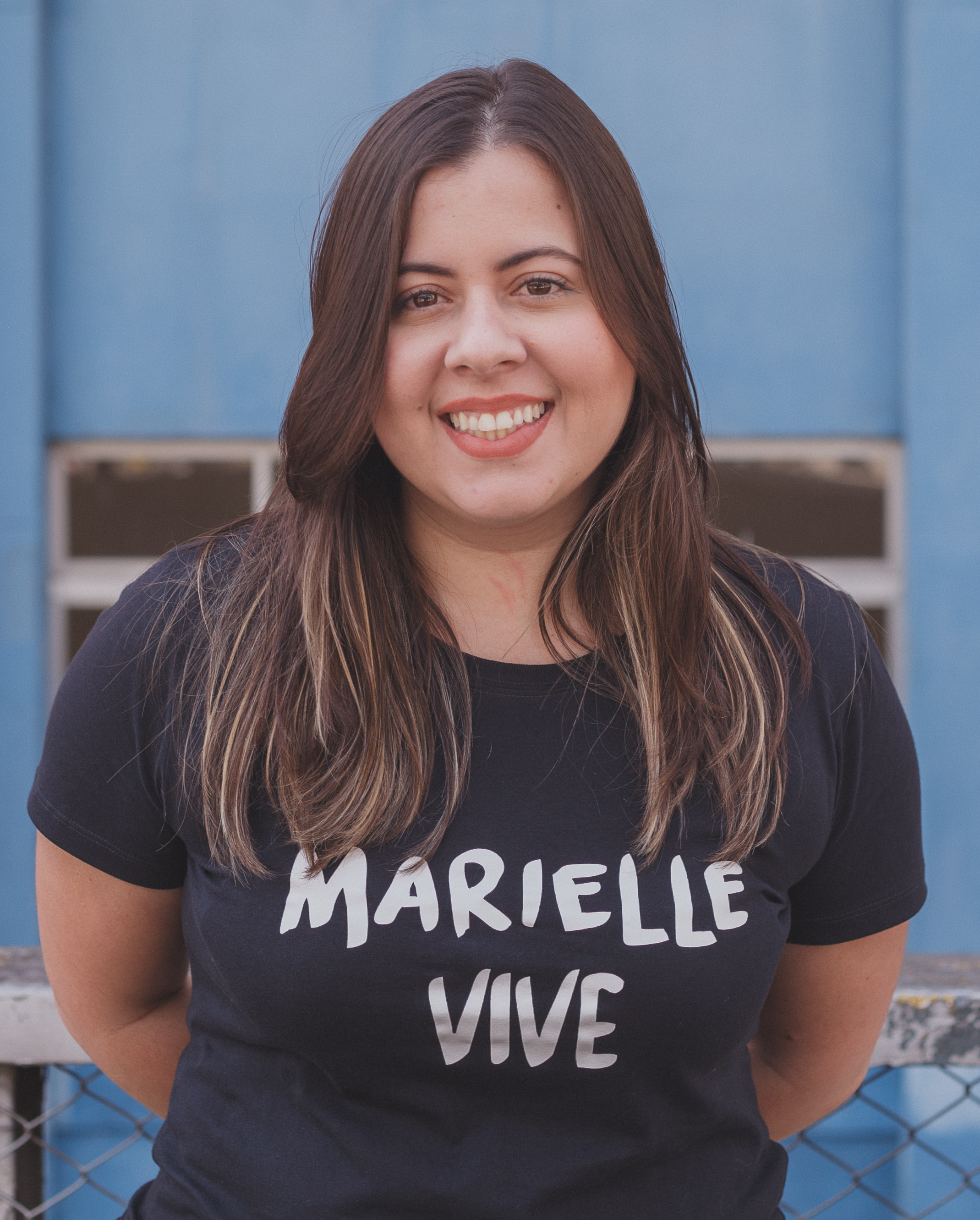
City Councillor
Sâmia Bomfim (PSOL)
from Presidente Prudente

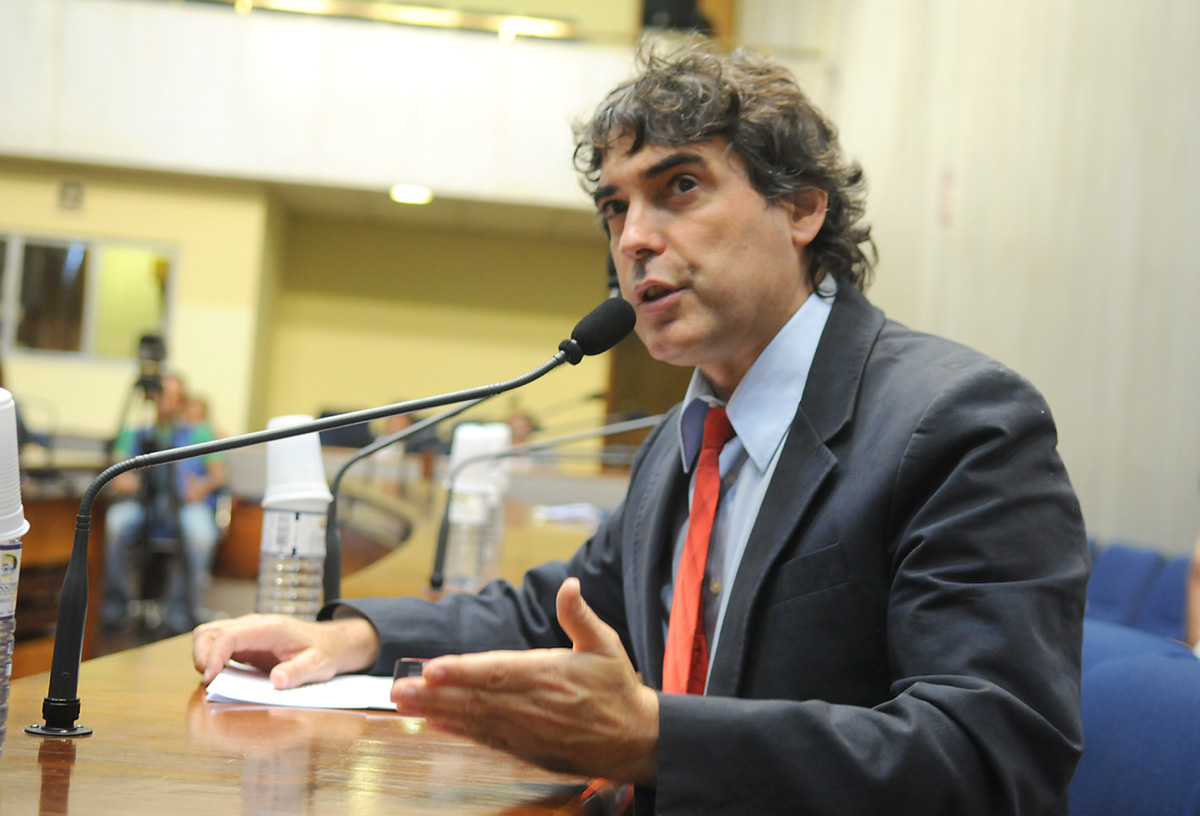
State Deputy
Carlos Giannazi (PSOL)
from São Paulo

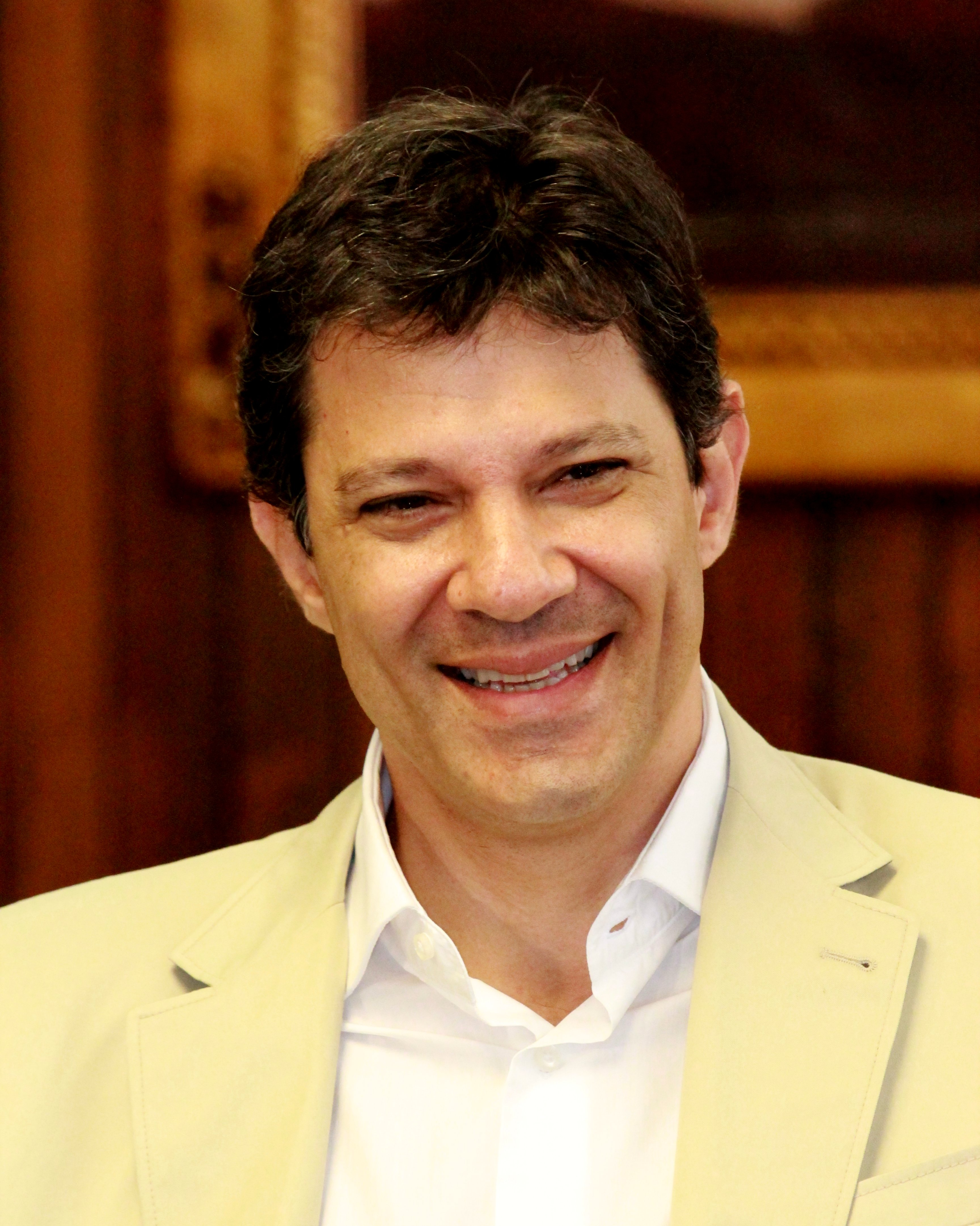
Former Mayor
Fernando Haddad (PT)
from São Paulo

== Opinion polls ==
=== First round ===
Polling aggregates
- Active candidates
- João Doria (PSDB)
- Márcio França (PSB)
- Paulo Skaf (MDB)
- Luiz Marinho (PT)
- Celso Russomanno (PRB)
- Others
- Abstentions/Undecided

View source data.

Pollster/client(s)	Date(s) conducted	Sample size	Doria PSDB	Alckmin PSDB	Skaf MDB	França PSB	Marinho PT	Padilha PT	Russomanno PRB	Others	Abst. Undec.	Lead
2018 election	7 Oct	–	31.77%	–	21.09%	21.53%	12.66%	–	–	12.95%	21.89%	10.24%
Datafolha	26–28 Sep	2,101	25%	–	22%	14%	6%	–	–	12%	23%	3%
Ibope	22–24 Sep	2,002	22%	–	24%	12%	5%	–	–	10%	25%	2%
Datafolha	18–19 Sep	2,032	26%	–	22%	11%	6%	–	–	10%	25%	4%
Ibope	16–18 Sep	1,512	23%	–	24%	9%	8%	–	–	9%	28%	1%
Ibope	7–9 Sep	1,512	21%	–	22%	8%	5%	–	–	8%	37%	1%
Datafolha	4–6 Sep	2,030	30%	–	23%	8%	5%	–	–	10%	30%	7%
Datafolha	20–21 Aug	2,018	29%	–	20%	4%	4%	–	–	13%	37%	9%
Ibope	17–19 Aug	1,204	25%	–	18%	5%	4%	–	–	9%	44%	7%
Ibope	29 Jul–1 Aug	1,008	28%	–	22%	3%	3%	–	–	4%	43%	6%
Paraná Pesquisas	12–17 Jul	2,000	32.6%	–	22.6%	8.6%	5.9%	–	–	–	7.4%	10%
Paraná Pesquisas	12–17 Jul	2,000	31.5%	–	31.1%	7.9%	5.0%	–	–	4.2%	21.5%	0.4%
Ibope	20–23 Jun	1,008	19%	–	17%	5%	3%	–	–	5%	48%	2%
Paraná Pesquisas	13–18 Jun	2,000	33.5%	–	22.3%	8.2%	6.5%	–	–	–	22.9%	11.2%
Paraná Pesquisas	13–18 Jun	2,000	31.8%	–	20.4%	7.0%	5.1%	–	–	5.2%	22.2%	11.4%
Ibope	20–23 Apr	1,008	24%	–	19%	3%	4%	–	–	3%	48%	5%
Datafolha	11–13 Apr	1,954	29%	–	20%	8%	7%	–	–	4%	31%	9%
Datafolha	11–13 Apr	1,954	36%	–	–	10%	9%	–	–	7%	38%	16%
Paraná Pesquisas	20–25 Feb	2,000	30.1%	–	12.9%	2.5%	3.6%	–	29.1%	3.6%	18.2%	1%
Paraná Pesquisas	20–25 Feb	2,000	39.8%	–	19.1%	3.5%	5.5%	–	–	7.0%	25.1%	20.7%
Paraná Pesquisas	20–25 Feb	2,000	29.2%	–	12.2%	2.2%	–	–	28.2%	12.4%	15.8%	1%
Paraná Pesquisas	20–25 Feb	2,000	37.3%	–	17.5%	3.0%	–	–	–	19.6%	22.6%	9.8%
Paraná Pesquisas	20–25 Feb	2,000	–	–	18.8%	4.0%	4.2%	–	37.5%	8.4%	28.1%	8.7%
Paraná Pesquisas	20–25 Feb	2,000	–	–	30.6%	5.3%	7.3%	–	–	14.2%	42.6%	23.3%
Paraná Pesquisas	20–25 Feb	2,000	–	–	18.9%	4.0%	4.2%	–	37.8%	7.9%	27.2%	18.9%
Paraná Pesquisas	20–25 Feb	2,000	–	–	30.8%	5.4%	7.2%	–	–	14.7%	41.9%	23.6%
Datafolha	28–30 Nov 2017	2,002	18%	–	13%	2%	–	–	25%	16%	22%	7%
Datafolha	28–30 Nov 2017	2,002	–	–	18%	3%	–	–	29%	25%	26%	11%
Datafolha	28–30 Nov 2017	2,002	–	–	16%	2%	–	–	25%	32%	24%	9%
Datafolha	28–30 Nov 2017	2,002	19%	–	13%	2%	3%	–	25%	12%	25%	6%
Datafolha	28–30 Nov 2017	2,002	–	–	18%	3%	3%	–	30%	14%	30%	12%
Datafolha	28–30 Nov 2017	2,002	–	–	16%	2%	2%	–	27%	27%	27%	11%
Datafolha	28–30 Nov 2017	2,002	–	–	20%	3%	4%	–	32%	5%	31%	12%
2014 election	5 Oct 2014	–	–	57.31%	21.53%	–	–	18.23%	–	2.94%	17.08%	35.78%

=== Second round ===
Polling aggregates
- Active candidates
- João Doria (PSDB)
- Márcio França (PSB)
- Paulo Skaf (MDB)
- Luiz Marinho (PT)
- Celso Russomanno (PRB)
- Others
- Abstentions/Undecided

View source data.

Pollster/client(s)	Date(s) conducted	Sample size	Doria PSDB	França PSB	Abst. Undec.	Lead
2018 election	28 Oct	–	51.75%	48.25%	17.79%	3.50%
Datafolha	26–27 Oct	5,093	42%	43%	15%	1%
Ibope	26–27 Oct	2,002	42%	43%	15%	1%
RealTime Big Data	25 Oct	3,000	48%	48%	4%	Tie
Datafolha	24–25 Oct	2,394	43%	40%	17%	3%
Ibope	20–23 Oct	1,512	46%	41%	14%	5%
Paraná Pesquisas	18–21 Oct	2,010	47.0%	39.8%	13.2%	7.2%
Datafolha	17–18 Oct	2,356	44%	40%	16%	4%
Ibope	15–17 Oct	1,512	46%	42%	12%	4%
Paraná Pesquisas	10–14 Oct	2,002	45.1%	41.1%	13.8%	4%

== Debates ==
=== Governor ===
2018 São Paulo gubernatorial election debates
No.	Date	Hosts	Moderators	Participants						
Key: P Present A Absent Out Out of the election				PSDB	MDB	PSB	PT	PSOL	PDT	PRTB
Key: P Present A Absent Out Out of the election				Doria	Skaf	França	Marinho	Arelaro	Cândido	Tavares
1.1	Thursday, 16 August 2018	Band, BandNews TV	Fábio Pannunzio	P	P	P	P	P	P	P
1.2	Friday, 24 August 2018	RedeTV!	Amanda Klein, Boris Casoy, Mariana Godoy	P	P	P	P	P	P	P
1.3	Sunday, 16 September 2018	TV Gazeta, O Estado de S. Paulo	Maria Lydia Flândoli	P	P	P	P	P	P	P
1.4	Wednesday, 19 September 2018	SBT, Folha de S. Paulo, UOL	Carlos Nascimento	P	P	P	P	P	P	P
1.5	Saturday, 29 September 2018	RecordTV, R7	Reinaldo Gottino	P	P	P	P	P	P	P
1.6	Tuesday, 2 October 2018	Rede Globo, G1, GloboNews	César Tralli	P	P	P	P	P	P	P
2.1	Thursday, 18 October 2018	Rede Bandeirantes	Fábio Pannunzio	P	P	Out				
2.2	Friday, 19 October 2018	RecordTV, R7	Reinaldo Gottino	P	P	Out				
2.3	Sunday, 21 October 2018	TV Gazeta, O Estado de S. Paulo, Jovem Pan	Maria Lydia Flândoli	Cancelled		Out				
2.4	Tuesday, 23 October 2018	SBT, Folha de S. Paulo, UOL	Carlos Nascimento	P	P	Out				
2.5	Thursday, 25 October 2018	Rede Globo, G1, GloboNews	César Tralli	P	P	Out				

=== Senator ===
2018 São Paulo senatorial election debates
No.	Date	Hosts	Moderators	Participants					
Key: P Present A Absent				PT	PSDB	PODE	PSL	PSB	PSDB
Key: P Present A Absent				Suplicy	Gabrilli	Covas	Olímpio	Maggi	Tripoli
1	Thursday, 20 September 2018	RedeTV!	Erica Reis, Mauro Tagliaferri	P	P	P	P	A	P
2	Monday, 1 October 2018	Folha de S. Paulo, UOL	—N/a	P	A	A	P	A	P

== Senate candidates ==
=== Confirmed candidates ===
Party	Candidate	Most relevant political office or occupation	Party	Candidates for Alternate Senators	Coalition	Electoral number
Democratic Labour Party (PDT)	Antonio Neto	President of the Central of Brazilian Unions (2012–present)	Democratic Labour Party (PDT)	1st alternate senator: Augusta Raeffray	—N/a	123
Democratic Labour Party (PDT)	Antonio Neto	President of the Central of Brazilian Unions (2012–present)	Democratic Labour Party (PDT)	2nd alternate senator: Maria Amélia	—N/a	123
Workers' Party (PT)	Eduardo Suplicy	Member of the Municipal Chamber of São Paulo (2017–2023)	Communist Party of Brazil (PCdoB)	1st alternate senator: Eduardo Annunciato	São Paulo of Work and Opportunities: Workers' Party (PT); Communist Party of Brazil (PCdoB)	131
Workers' Party (PT)	Eduardo Suplicy	Member of the Municipal Chamber of São Paulo (2017–2023)	Workers' Party (PT)	2nd alternate senator: Silvana Donatti	São Paulo of Work and Opportunities: Workers' Party (PT); Communist Party of Brazil (PCdoB)	131
Workers' Party (PT)	Jilmar Tatto	Secretary of Transports of São Paulo (2013–2017)	Workers' Party (PT)	1st alternate senator: Marilândia Frazão	São Paulo of Work and Opportunities: Workers' Party (PT); Communist Party of Brazil (PCdoB)	132
Workers' Party (PT)	Jilmar Tatto	Secretary of Transports of São Paulo (2013–2017)	Workers' Party (PT)	2nd alternate senator: Benedito Barbosa	São Paulo of Work and Opportunities: Workers' Party (PT); Communist Party of Brazil (PCdoB)	132
Brazilian Democratic Movement (MDB)	Marcelo Barbieri	Mayor of Araraquara (2009–2017)	Brazilian Democratic Movement (MDB)	1st alternate senator: Rodrigo Arenas	—N/a	151
Brazilian Democratic Movement (MDB)	Marcelo Barbieri	Mayor of Araraquara (2009–2017)	Brazilian Democratic Movement (MDB)	2nd alternate senator: George Hato	—N/a	151
Brazilian Democratic Movement (MDB)	Cidinha Pinto		Brazilian Democratic Movement (MDB)	1st alternate senator: Rodrigo Mandaliti	—N/a	155
Brazilian Democratic Movement (MDB)	Cidinha Pinto		Brazilian Democratic Movement (MDB)	2nd alternate senator: Maria Rita	—N/a	155
United Socialist Workers' Party (PSTU)	Luiz Carlos Prates	Member of trade union CSP-Conlutas	United Socialist Workers' Party (PSTU)	1st alternate senator: César Raya	—N/a	160
United Socialist Workers' Party (PSTU)	Luiz Carlos Prates	Member of trade union CSP-Conlutas	United Socialist Workers' Party (PSTU)	2nd alternate senator: Raquel Polla	—N/a	160
United Socialist Workers' Party (PSTU)	Eliana Ferreira	Lawyer	United Socialist Workers' Party (PSTU)	1st alternate senator: Veruska Tenório	—N/a	161
United Socialist Workers' Party (PSTU)	Eliana Ferreira	Lawyer	United Socialist Workers' Party (PSTU)	2nd alternate senator: Sérgio Koei	—N/a	161
Social Liberal Party (PSL)	Sérgio Olímpio	Member of the Chamber of Deputies (2015–2019)	Social Liberal Party (PSL)	1st alternate senator: Alexandre Giordano	São Paulo Above Everything, God Above Everyone: Brazilian Labour Renewal Party (PRTB); Social Liberal Party (PSL)	177
Social Liberal Party (PSL)	Sérgio Olímpio	Member of the Chamber of Deputies (2015–2019)	Social Liberal Party (PSL)	2nd alternate senator: Marcos Pontes	São Paulo Above Everything, God Above Everyone: Brazilian Labour Renewal Party (PRTB); Social Liberal Party (PSL)	177
Sustainability Network (REDE)	Moira Lázaro	Middle school teacher	Sustainability Network (REDE)	1st alternate senator: Nilza Camilo	Sustainable Mobilization for São Paulo: Party of National Mobilization (PMN); Sustainability Network (REDE)	180
Sustainability Network (REDE)	Moira Lázaro	Middle school teacher	Sustainability Network (REDE)	2nd alternate senator: Bruna Maria	Sustainable Mobilization for São Paulo: Party of National Mobilization (PMN); Sustainability Network (REDE)	180
Sustainability Network (REDE)	Pedro Henrique de Cristo	University professor	Sustainability Network (REDE)	1st alternate senator: Marcus André	Sustainable Mobilization for São Paulo: Party of National Mobilization (PMN); Sustainability Network (REDE)	188
Sustainability Network (REDE)	Pedro Henrique de Cristo	University professor	Sustainability Network (REDE)	2nd alternate senator: Allen Ferraudo	Sustainable Mobilization for São Paulo: Party of National Mobilization (PMN); Sustainability Network (REDE)	188
Podemos (PODE)	Mário Covas Neto	Member of the Municipal Chamber of São Paulo (2013–2020)	Podemos (PODE)	1st alternate senator: Raul Abreu	São Paulo Trust and Advance: Brazilian Socialist Party (PSB); Party of the Republic (PR); Social Christian Party (PSC); Popular Socialist Party (PPS); Brazilian Labour Party (PTB); Green Party (PV); Podemos (PODE); Brazilian Woman's Party (PMB); Humanist Party of Solidarity (PHS); Free Fatherland Party (PPL); Progressive Republican Party (PRP); Patriota (PATRI); Republican Party of the Social Order (PROS); Solidariedade; Avante	191
Podemos (PODE)	Mário Covas Neto	Member of the Municipal Chamber of São Paulo (2013–2020)	Podemos (PODE)	2nd alternate senator: Ricardo Calvet	São Paulo Trust and Advance: Brazilian Socialist Party (PSB); Party of the Republic (PR); Social Christian Party (PSC); Popular Socialist Party (PPS); Brazilian Labour Party (PTB); Green Party (PV); Podemos (PODE); Brazilian Woman's Party (PMB); Humanist Party of Solidarity (PHS); Free Fatherland Party (PPL); Progressive Republican Party (PRP); Patriota (PATRI); Republican Party of the Social Order (PROS); Solidariedade; Avante	191
Brazilian Socialist Party (PSB)	Maurren Maggi	Former Olympic athlete	Brazilian Socialist Party (PSB)	1st alternate senator: Marco Souza Dateninha	São Paulo Trust and Advance: Brazilian Socialist Party (PSB); Party of the Republic (PR); Social Christian Party (PSC); Popular Socialist Party (PPS); Brazilian Labour Party (PTB); Green Party (PV); Podemos (PODE); Brazilian Woman's Party (PMB); Humanist Party of Solidarity (PHS); Free Fatherland Party (PPL); Progressive Republican Party (PRP); Patriota (PATRI); Republican Party of the Social Order (PROS); Solidariedade; Avante	400
Brazilian Socialist Party (PSB)	Maurren Maggi	Former Olympic athlete	Green Party (PV)	2nd alternate senator: José Brito de França	São Paulo Trust and Advance: Brazilian Socialist Party (PSB); Party of the Republic (PR); Social Christian Party (PSC); Popular Socialist Party (PPS); Brazilian Labour Party (PTB); Green Party (PV); Podemos (PODE); Brazilian Woman's Party (PMB); Humanist Party of Solidarity (PHS); Free Fatherland Party (PPL); Progressive Republican Party (PRP); Patriota (PATRI); Republican Party of the Social Order (PROS); Solidariedade; Avante	400
New Party (NOVO)	Diogo da Luz	Aviation pilot	New Party (NOVO)	1st alternate senator: Rodrigo Fonseca	—N/a	300
New Party (NOVO)	Diogo da Luz	Aviation pilot	New Party (NOVO)	2nd alternate senator: Daniel Kotez	—N/a	300
Brazilian Social Democracy Party (PSDB)	Ricardo Tripoli	Member of the Chamber of Deputies (2007–2019)	Brazilian Social Democracy Party (PSDB)	1st alternate senator: Carlinda Araujo	Speed Up SP: Brazilian Social Democracy Party (PSDB); Democrats (DEM); Social Democratic Party (PSD); Brazilian Republican Party (PRB); Progressistas (PP); Christian Labour Party (PTC)	450
Brazilian Social Democracy Party (PSDB)	Ricardo Tripoli	Member of the Chamber of Deputies (2007–2019)	Brazilian Social Democracy Party (PSDB)	2nd alternate senator: João Jorge	Speed Up SP: Brazilian Social Democracy Party (PSDB); Democrats (DEM); Social Democratic Party (PSD); Brazilian Republican Party (PRB); Progressistas (PP); Christian Labour Party (PTC)	450
Brazilian Social Democracy Party (PSDB)	Mara Gabrilli	Member of the Chamber of Deputies (2015–2019)	Social Democratic Party (PSD)	1st alternate senator: Alfredo Cotait Neto	Speed Up SP: Brazilian Social Democracy Party (PSDB); Democrats (DEM); Social Democratic Party (PSD); Brazilian Republican Party (PRB); Progressistas (PP); Christian Labour Party (PTC)	457
Brazilian Social Democracy Party (PSDB)	Mara Gabrilli	Member of the Chamber of Deputies (2015–2019)	Social Democratic Party (PSD)	2nd alternate senator: Ivani Boscolo	Speed Up SP: Brazilian Social Democracy Party (PSDB); Democrats (DEM); Social Democratic Party (PSD); Brazilian Republican Party (PRB); Progressistas (PP); Christian Labour Party (PTC)	457
Socialism and Liberty Party (PSOL)	Silvia Ferraro	Middle school teacher	Socialism and Liberty Party (PSOL)	1st alternate senator: Jorge Paz	Not Afraid to Change São Paulo: Socialism and Liberty Party (PSOL); Brazilian Communist Party (PCB)	500
Socialism and Liberty Party (PSOL)	Silvia Ferraro	Middle school teacher	Socialism and Liberty Party (PSOL)	2nd alternate senator: Jucinaldo Azevedo	Not Afraid to Change São Paulo: Socialism and Liberty Party (PSOL); Brazilian Communist Party (PCB)	500
Socialism and Liberty Party (PSOL)	Daniel Cara	University professor	Socialism and Liberty Party (PSOL)	1st alternate senator: Luciene Cavalcante	505	
Socialism and Liberty Party (PSOL)	Daniel Cara	University professor	Socialism and Liberty Party (PSOL)	2nd alternate senator: Paulo Spina	505	

=== Candidacies denied ===
Party	Candidate	Most relevant political office or occupation	Party	Candidates for Alternate Senators	Coalition	Electoral number
Christian Democracy (DC)	Kaled El Malat	Municipal public servant	Christian Democracy (DC)	1st alternate senator: Antonio Galdi	—N/a	277
Christian Democracy (DC)	Kaled El Malat	Municipal public servant	Christian Democracy (DC)	2nd alternate senator: Armando Barreto	—N/a	277
Brazilian Labour Renewal Party (PRTB)	Jair Andreoni	Lawyer	Brazilian Labour Renewal Party (PRTB)	1st alternate senator: Alfredo Farina Junior	São Paulo Above Everything, God Above Everyone: Brazilian Labour Renewal Party (PRTB); Social Liberal Party (PSL)	281
Brazilian Labour Renewal Party (PRTB)	Jair Andreoni	Lawyer	Brazilian Labour Renewal Party (PRTB)	2nd alternate senator: Reinaldo Castilho Pedroso	São Paulo Above Everything, God Above Everyone: Brazilian Labour Renewal Party (PRTB); Social Liberal Party (PSL)	281
Workers' Cause Party (PCO)	Nivaldo Orlandi	Accounter	Workers' Cause Party (PCO)	1st alternate senator: Angelina Dias	—N/a	290
Workers' Cause Party (PCO)	Nivaldo Orlandi	Accounter	Workers' Cause Party (PCO)	2nd alternate senator: Ulisses Coelho	—N/a	290

=== Declined candidates ===
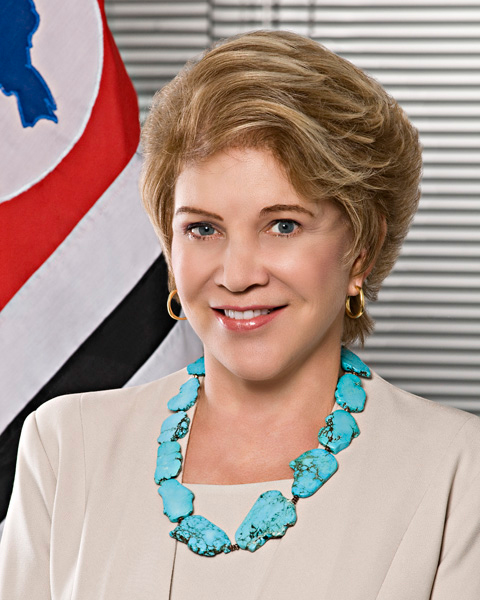
Senator
Marta Suplicy (MDB)
from São Paulo

== Results ==
=== Governor ===
Candidate	Running mate	Party	First round		Second round	
Candidate	Running mate	Party	Votes	%	Votes	%
João Doria	Rodrigo Garcia (DEM)	PSDB	6,431,555	31.77	10,990,350	51.75
Márcio França (incumbent)	Eliane Nikoluk (PTB)	PSB	4,358,998	21.53	10,248,740	48.25
Paulo Skaf	Carla Basson	MDB	4,268,865	21.09		
Luiz Marinho	Ana Bock	PT	2,563,922	12.66		
Adriano Costa e Silva	Fátima Santos	DC	747,462	3.69		
Rogério Chequer	Andrea Menezes	NOVO	673,102	3.32		
Rodrigo Tavares	Jairo Glikson	PRTB	649,729	3.21		
Lisete Arelaro	Maurício Costa	PSOL	507,236	2.51		
Marcelo Cândido	Gleides Sodré	PDT	323,235			
Claudio Fernando	Roberto Campos (REDE)	PMN	28,666	0.14		
Toninho Ferreira	Ariana Gonçalves	PSTU	16,202	0.08		
Lilian Miranda	Marcio Roberto	PCO	7,035			
Total			20,245,737	100.00	21,239,090	100.00
Valid votes			20,245,737	78.11	21,239,090	82.20
Invalid votes			3,872,836	14.94	3,543,394	13.71
Blank votes			1,801,747	6.95	1,054,978	4.08
Total votes			25,920,320	100.00	25,837,462	100.00
Registered voters/turnout			33,032,785	78.47	33,032,785	78.22
PSDB hold						
Source: UOL

Popular vote (first round)
Doria	31.77%
França	21.53%
Skaf	21.09%
Marinho	12.66%
Costa e Silva	3.69%
Chequer	3.32%
Tavares	3.21%
Arelaro	2.51%
Others	0.22%

Popular vote (second round)
Doria	51.75%
França	48.25%

=== Senator ===
Candidate	Party	Votes	%
Sérgio Olímpio	PSL	9,039,717	25.81
Mara Gabrilli	PSDB	6,513,282	18.59
Eduardo Suplicy	PT	4,667,565	13.32
Ricardo Tripoli	PSDB	3,154,058	9.00
Maurren Maggi	PSB	2,979,856	8.51
Mário Covas Neto	PODE	2,127,983	6.07
Jilmar Tatto	PT	2,103,377	6.00
Diogo da Luz	NOVO	1,778,884	5.08
Maria Aparecida Pinto	MDB	587,859	1.68
Silvia Ferraro	PSOL	543,583	1.55
Daniel Cara	PSOL	440,118	1.26
Marcelo Barbieri	MDB	386,880	1.10
Antonio Neto	PDT	358,432	1.02
Jair Andreoni	PRTB	145,944	
Pedro Henrique de Castro	REDE	136,466	0.39
Kaled El Malat	DC	134,266	
Moira Lázaro	REDE	129,146	0.37
Eliana Ferreira	PSTU	60,731	0.17
Luiz Carlos Prates	PSTU	21,183	0.06
Nivaldo Orlandi	PCO	7,419	
Total		35,029,120	100.00
Valid votes		35,029,120	67.57
Invalid votes		11,213,560	21.63
Blank votes		5,599,960	10.80
Total votes		51,842,640	100.00
Registered voters/turnout		33,032,372	78.44
PSL gain from MDB			
PSDB hold			
Source: UOL

Popular vote
Olímpio	25.81%
Gabrilli	18.59%
Suplicy	13.32%
Tripoli	9.00%
Maggi	8.51%
Covas	6.07%
Tatto	6.00%
Luz	5.08%
Others	7.60%

=== Chamber of Deputies ===
Party	Votes	%	Seats	+/–
Social Liberal Party	4,409,549	20.89	10	▲10
Workers' Party	2,067,527	9.80	8	▼2
Party of the Republic	1,734,561	8.22	7	▲6
Brazilian Social Democracy Party	1,729,697	8.20	6	▼8
Brazilian Republican Party	1,591,587	7.54	6	▼2
Democrats	1,089,549	5.16	5	▲1
Brazilian Socialist Party	1,062,726	5.04	4	Steady
Socialism and Liberty Party	915,206	4.34	3	▲2
New Party	899,904	4.26	3	New
Podemos	688,572	3.26	3	▲2
Social Democratic Party	679,597	3.22	2	▼3
Progressistas	639,122	3.03	4	▲2
Brazilian Democratic Movement	527,821	2.50	2	Steady
Democratic Labour Party	451,442	2.14	1	Steady
Green Party	414,051	1.96	1	▼2
Popular Socialist Party	370,482	1.76	2	Steady
Solidarity	255,231	1.21	1	Steady
Patriota	229,241	1.09	0	Steady
Republican Party of the Social Order	201,879	0.96	0	Steady
Brazilian Labour Party	200,514	0.95	0	▼2
Sustainability Network	188,987	0.90	0	New
Avante	141,467	0.67	0	Steady
Progressive Republican Party	131,974	0.63	0	Steady
Social Christian Party	112,504	0.53	1	▼2
Communist Party of Brazil	89,286	0.42	1	Steady
Brazilian Labour Renewal Party	77,350	0.37	0	Steady
Free Fatherland Party	50,024	0.24	0	Steady
Humanist Party of Solidarity	47,817	0.23	0	Steady
Party of National Mobilization	35,643	0.17	0	Steady
Christian Democracy	19,307	0.09	0	Steady
Brazilian Woman's Party	18,204	0.09	0	New
Christian Labour Party	14,189	0.07	0	Steady
United Socialist Workers' Party	11,682	0.06	0	Steady
Workers' Cause Party	7,486	0.04	0	Steady
Total	21,104,178	100.00	70	–
Valid votes	21,104,178	81.42		
Invalid votes	2,864,333	11.05		
Blank votes	1,952,806	7.53		
Total votes	25,921,317	100.00		
Registered voters/turnout	33,032,372	78.47		
Source: UOL

=== Legislative Assembly ===
Party	Votes	%	Seats	+/–
Social Liberal Party	4,025,339	19.31	15	▲14
Brazilian Social Democracy Party	2,003,387	9.61	8	▼14
Workers' Party	1,940,265	9.31	10	▼4
Brazilian Socialist Party	1,268,862	6.09	8	▲2
Democrats	1,230,234	5.90	7	▼1
Party of the Republic	1,196,787	5.74	6	▲3
Socialism and Liberty Party	906,670	4.35	4	▲2
New Party	891,319	4.27	4	New
Podemos	874,310	4.19	4	▲3
Progressistas	852,277	4.09	4	▲2
Brazilian Republican Party	745,238	3.57	6	▼2
Brazilian Democratic Movement	598,084	2.87	3	▲1
Social Democratic Party	559,380	2.68	2	▼2
Green Party	468,653	2.25	1	▼2
Brazilian Labour Party	365,566	1.75	2	Steady
Popular Socialist Party	337,380	1.62	2	Steady
Humanist Party of Solidarity	325,114	1.56	1	Steady
Patriota	313,957	1.51	1	▼2
Republican Party of the Social Order	309,886	1.49	1	▲1
Democratic Labour Party	300,680	1.44	1	Steady
Communist Party of Brazil	246,100	1.18	1	▼1
Solidariedade	232,081	1.11	1	Steady
Avante	210,034	1.01	1	Steady
Sustainability Network	164,367	0.79	1	New
Progressive Republican Party	155,358	0.75	0	Steady
Social Christian Party	125,079	0.60	0	Steady
Brazilian Labour Renewal Party	52,706	0.25	0	Steady
Party of National Mobilization	31,326	0.15	0	Steady
Free Fatherland Party	30,826	0.15	0	Steady
Christian Labour Party	24,566	0.12	0	Steady
Brazilian Woman's Party	23,039	0.11	0	New
Christian Democracy	18,119	0.09	0	Steady
United Socialist Workers' Party	16,549	0.08	0	Steady
Workers' Cause Party	7,558	0.04	0	Steady
Total	20,851,096	100.00	94	–
Valid votes	20,851,096	80.44		
Invalid votes	2,932,443	11.31		
Blank votes	2,137,781	8.25		
Total votes	25,921,320	100.00		
Registered voters/turnout	33,032,372	78.47		
Source: UOL
