= 2016 São Paulo mayoral election =

2016 São Paulo municipal election
- October 2, 2016
- Mayoral election
- Opinion polls
- Turnout: 78.16%
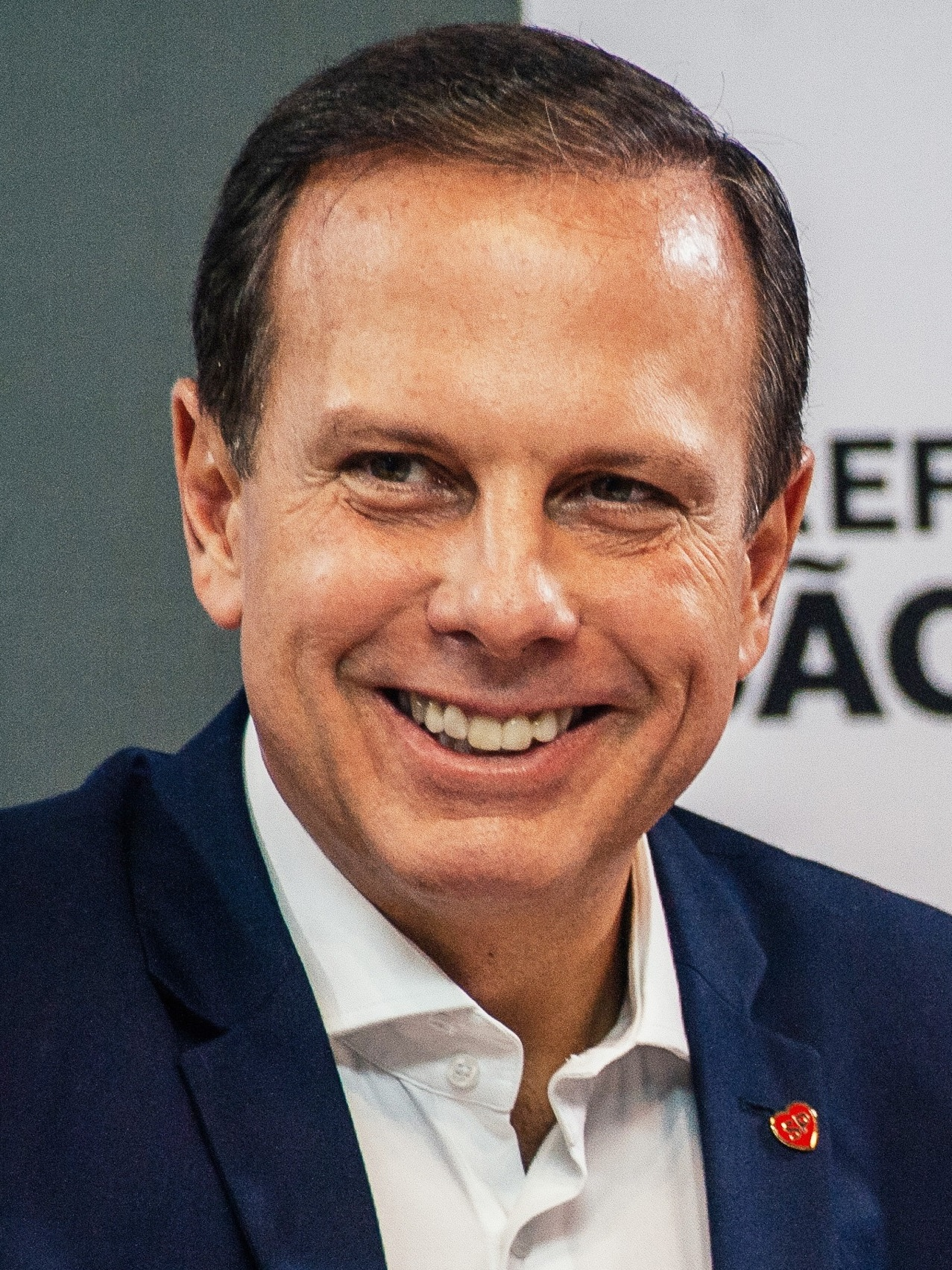

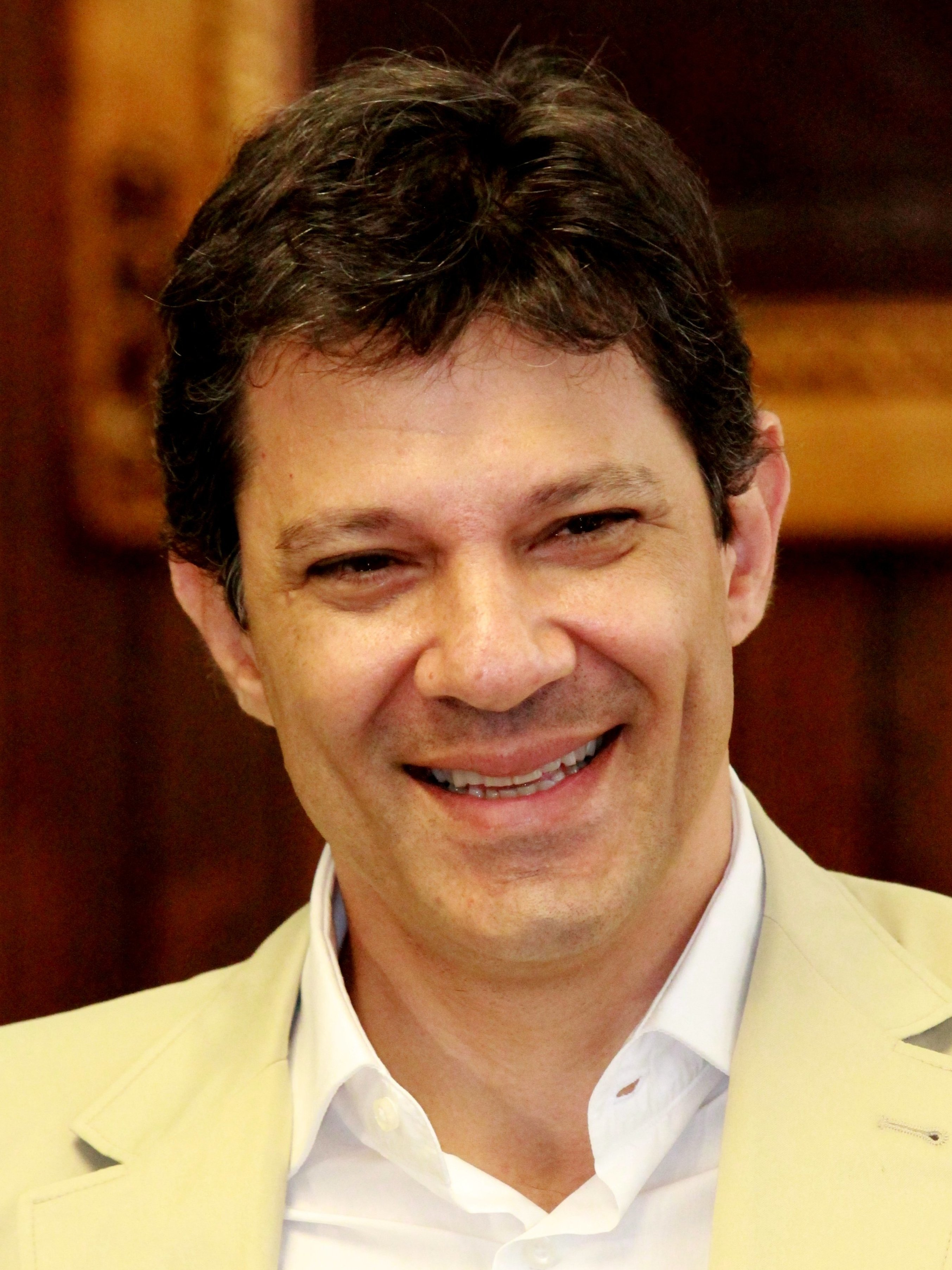
| Candidate | João Doria | Fernando Haddad |
| Party | PSDB | PT |
| Alliance | Speed Up SP | More São Paulo |
| Running mate | Bruno Covas | Gabriel Chalita (PDT) |
| Popular vote | 3,085,187 | 967,190 |
| Percentage | 53.28% | 16.70% |
- Most voted candidate per electoral zone: Doria: 30-39% 40-49% 50-59% 60-69% 70-79% Marta: 30-39%
Mayor before election
Fernando Haddad
PT
Elected mayor
João Doria
PSDB
- Parliamentary election
| Party | Leader | Vote % | Seats | +/– |
Municipal Chamber
| PSDB | Aurélio Nomura | 19.23% | 11 | +2 |
| PT | Senival Moura | 15.90% | 9 | −2 |
| Republicanos | Souza Santos | 7.88% | 4 | +2 |
| DEM | Sandra Tadeu | 5.21% | 4 | +2 |
| MDB | Nelo Rodolfo | 4.74% | 2 | −2 |
| PSD | José Police Neto | 4.56% | 4 | −3 |
| PV | Abou Anni | 4.37% | 2 | −2 |
| PTB | Paulo Frange | 4.10% | 2 | −2 |
| PSOL | Toninho Vespoli | 3.44% | 2 | +1 |
| PR | Toninho Paiva | 3.02% | 4 | +1 |
| PTN | None | 2.74% | 1 | +1 |
| PCdoB | None | 1.56% | 0 | −1 |
| PSC | None | 1.09% | 1 | +1 |
This lists parties that won seats. See the complete results below.

The 2016 São Paulo municipal election took place in the city of São Paulo on the 2 October 2016. Voters voted to elect the Mayor, the Vice Mayor and 55 City Councillors for the administration of the city. The result was a 1st round victory for João Doria of the Brazilian Social Democratic Party (PSDB), winning 3,085,187 votes and a share of 53,28% of the popular vote, defeating incumbent mayor Fernando Haddad of the Workers' Party (PT), who took 967,190 votes and a share of 16,70% of the popular vote. Although Haddad came in second place on the popular vote, he did not win any electoral zone, while Marta Suplicy (PMDB), who came in fourth place, managed to win a plurality of the votes in 2 electoral zones.

== Background ==
The campaign happened in the context of the ongoing political crisis and the fallout after the recently impeached president Dilma Rousseff, of the Workers' Party (PT). This event played a huge role in the election, which would see a weakened Worker's Party (PT). The election saw the resurgence of the Brazilian Social Democratic Party (PSDB) with Doria emerging as their leading candidate in opposition to the Worker's Party, which was suffering a steady decline following Dilma's impeachment.

Incumbent mayor Fernando Haddad ran a reelection campaign on keeping the left-wing status-quo, in contrast to Doria's campaign, which emphasized mostly socially liberal economic reforms, as part of the "liberal wave" following the fallout of Dilma's impeachment. Among other candidates were Celso Russomano (PRB), Marta Suplicy (PMDB), Altino Prazeres (PSTU), Ricardo Young (REDE), João Bico (PSDC), Levy Fidelix (PRTB), Luiza Erundina (PSOL) and Major Olímpio (SD).

== Candidates ==
| Party | Candidate | Most relevant political office or occupation | Party | Running mate | Coalition | Electoral number |
|---|---|---|---|---|---|---|
| Brazilian Republican Party (PRB) | Celso Russomanno | Member of the Chamber of Deputies (since 2015) | Brazilian Labour Party (PTB) | Marlene Campos Machado | São Paulo Knows, We Solve It: Brazilian Republican Party (PRB); Brazilian Labour Party (PTB); Social Christian Party (PSC); National Ecologic Party (PEN) | 10 |
| Workers' Party (PT) | Fernando Haddad | Mayor of São Paulo (2013–2017) | Democratic Labour Party (PDT) | Gabriel Chalita | More São Paulo: Workers' Party (PT); Democratic Labour Party (PDT); Communist Party of Brazil (PCdoB); Party of the Republic (PR); Republican Party of the Social Order (PROS) | 13 |
| Brazilian Democratic Movement Party (PMDB) | Marta Suplicy | Senator for São Paulo (2011–2019) | Social Democratic Party (PSD) | Andrea Matarazzo | Union for São Paulo: Brazilian Democratic Movement Party (PMDB); Social Democratic Party (PSD) | 15 |
| United Socialist Workers' Party (PSTU) | Altino Prazes | Former president of São Paulo Metro Workers' Union | United Socialist Workers' Party (PSTU) | Janaína Rodrigues | —N/a | 16 |
| Sustainability Network (REDE) | Ricardo Young | Member of the Municipal Chamber of São Paulo (2013–2017) | Sustainability Network (REDE) | Carlota Mingolla | —N/a | 18 |
| Christian Social Democratic Party (PSDC) | João Bico | Vice President of the Trade Association of São Paulo | Christian Social Democratic Party (PSDC) | Sílvia Cristina | —N/a | 27 |
| Brazilian Labour Renewal Party (PRTB) | Levy Fidelix | PRTB National President (1994–2021) | Brazilian Labour Renewal Party (PRTB) | Jairo Glikson | —N/a | 28 |
| Brazilian Social Democracy Party (PSDB) | João Doria | Businessman and TV presenter | Brazilian Social Democracy Party (PSDB) | Bruno Covas | Speed Up SP: Brazilian Social Democracy Party (PSDB); Progressive Party (PP); Brazilian Socialist Party (PSB); Democrats (DEM); National Labour Party (PTN); Party of National Mobilization (PMN); Popular Socialist Party (PPS); Humanist Party of Solidarity (PHS); Green Party (PV); Social Liberal Party; Brazilian Woman's Party (PMB); Progressive Republican Party (PRP); Christian Labour Party (PTC); Labour Party of Brazil (PTdoB) | 45 |
| Socialism and Liberty Party (PSOL) | Luiza Erundina | Member of the Chamber of Deputies (since 1999) | Socialism and Liberty Party (PSOL) | Ivan Valente | Dreams Can Govern: Socialism and Liberty Party (PSOL); Brazilian Communist Party (PCB); Free Fatherland Party (PPL) | 50 |
| Solidariedade | Sérgio Olímpio | Member of the Chamber of Deputies (2015–2019) | Solidariedade | David Martins | —N/a | 77 |

== Debates ==
2020 São Paulo mayoral election debates
| No. | Date | Host and Location | Moderator | Participants | | | | |
| Key: P Present A Absent N Not invited | | | | PSDB | PRB | PT | SD | PSOL |
| Key: P Present A Absent N Not invited | | | | Doria | Russomanno | Haddad | Olímpio | Erundina |
|---|---|---|---|---|---|---|---|---|
| 1 | Monday, 22 August 2016 | Band TV; São Paulo, Morumbi | Boris Casoy | P | P | P | P | N |
| 2 | Friday, 2 September 2016 | RedeTV!, Veja, UOL, Facebook; Osasco, Ayrosa | Amanda Klein, Mariana Godoy | P | P | P | P | P |
| 3 | Sunday, 18 September 2016 | TV Gazeta, O Estado de S. Paulo, Twitter; São Paulo, Bela Vista | Maria Lydia Flândoli | P | P | P | P | P |
| 4 | Friday, 23 September 2016 | SBT, UOL, Folha de S. Paulo; Osasco, Industrial Anhanguera | Carlos Nascimento | P | P | P | P | P |
| 5 | Sunday, 25 September 2016 | RecordTV, Google; São Paulo, Barra Funda | Adriana Araújo | P | P | P | P | P |
| 6 | Thursday, 29 September 2016 | TV Globo; São Paulo, Itaim Bibi | César Tralli | P | P | P | P | P |

== Opinion polls ==
Polling aggregates
- Active candidates
- João Doria (PSDB)
- Fernando Haddad (PT)
- Celso Russomanno (PRB)
- Marta Suplicy (PMDB)
- Others
- Abstentions/Undecided

View source data.

| Pollster/client(s) | Date(s) conducted | Sample size | Russomanno PRB | Suplicy PMDB | Chalita PMDB | Haddad PT | Erundina PSOL | Giannazi PSOL | Doria PSDB | Serra PSDB | Matarazzo PSD/PSDB | Others | Abst. Undec. | Lead |
|---|---|---|---|---|---|---|---|---|---|---|---|---|---|---|
| 2016 election | 2 Oct | – | 13.64% | 10.14% | – | 16.70% | 3.16% | – | 53.29% | – | – | 3.04% | 21.84% | 36.59% |
| Ibope | 29 Sep–1 Oct | 1,204 | 20% | 16% | – | 13% | 5% | – | 30% | – | – | 3% | 13% | 10% |
| Datafolha | 30 Sep–1 Oct | 4,022 | 14% | 12% | – | 14% | 5% | – | 38% | – | – | 3% | 14% | 24% |
| Ibope | 25–28 Sep | 1,204 | 22% | 16% | – | 13% | 5% | – | 28% | – | – | 4% | 12% | 6% |
| Datafolha | 26 Sep | 1,260 | 22% | 15% | – | 11% | 5% | – | 30% | – | – | 2% | 16% | 8% |
| Ibope | 20–26 Sep | 1,204 | 24% | 15% | – | 12% | 4% | – | 28% | – | – | 3% | 14% | 4% |
| Datafolha | 21 Sep | 1,260 | 22% | 20% | – | 10% | 4% | – | 25% | – | – | 3% | 15% | 3% |
| Paraná Pesquisas | 16–20 Sep | 1,200 | 27.7% | 19.5% | – | 8.5% | 4.9% | – | 21.2% | – | – | 3.3% | 15% | 6.5% |
| Ibope | 10–13 Sep | 1,001 | 30% | 20% | – | 9% | 5% | – | 17% | – | – | 3% | 16% | 10% |
| Datafolha | 8 Sep | 1,092 | 26% | 21% | – | 9% | 7% | – | 16% | – | – | 4% | 17% | 5% |
| Paraná Pesquisas | 28 Aug–1 Sep | 1,200 | 32.1% | 15.8% | – | 7.0% | 7.1% | – | 13.7% | – | – | 4.7% | 19.5% | 16.1% |
| Datafolha | 23–24 Aug | 1,092 | 31% | 16% | – | 8% | 10% | – | 5% | – | – | 5% | 24% | 15% |
| Ibope | 19–22 Aug | 805 | 33% | 17% | – | 9% | 9% | – | 9% | – | – | 6% | 17% | 16% |
| Ibope | 22–27 Jul | 602 | 29% | 10% | – | 7% | 8% | – | 7% | – | – | 17% | 18% | 19% |
| Datafolha | 12–13 Jul | 1,092 | 25% | 16% | – | 8% | 10% | – | 6% | – | – | 13% | 23% | 9% |
| Datafolha | 12–13 Jul | 1,092 | – | 21% | – | 11% | 13% | – | 7% | – | – | 19% | 30% | 8% |
| Datafolha | 16–19 Jun | 602 | 26% | 10% | – | 7% | 8% | – | 6% | – | – | 18% | 26% | 16% |
| Datafolha | 28–29 Oct 2015 | 1,092 | 34% | 13% | – | 12% | – | – | 3% | – | – | 17% | 20% | 11% |
| Datafolha | 28–29 Oct 2015 | 1,092 | 34% | 13% | – | 12% | – | – | – | – | 4% | 17% | 20% | 11% |
| 2012 election | 7 Oct | – | 21.6% | – | 13.6% | 28.98% | – | 1.02% | – | 30.75% | – | 4.04% | 12.78% | 1.77% |

== Results ==
=== Mayor ===
| Candidate | Running mate | Party | Votes | % |
|---|---|---|---|---|
| João Doria | Bruno Covas | PSDB | 3,085,187 | 53.29 |
| Fernando Haddad (incumbent) | Gabriel Chalita (PDT) | PT | 967,190 | 16.70 |
| Celso Russomanno | Marlene Campos Machado (PTB) | PRB | 789,986 | 13.64 |
| Marta Suplicy | Andrea Matarazzo (PSD) | PMDB | 587,220 | 10.14 |
| Luiza Erundina | Ivan Valente | PSOL | 184,000 | 3.18 |
| Sérgio Olímpio | David Martins | SD | 116,870 | 2.02 |
| Ricardo Young | Carlota Mingola | REDE | 25,993 | 0.45 |
| Levy Fidelix | Jairo Glikson | PRTB | 21,705 | 0.37 |
| João Bico | Sílvia Cristina | PSDC | 6,006 | 0.10 |
| Altino Prazeres | Janaina Rodrigues | PSTU | 4,715 | 0.08 |
| Henrique Áreas | Tranquillo Moterle | PCO | 1,019 | 0.02 |
| Total | | | 5,789,891 | 100.00 |
| Valid votes | | | 5,789,891 | 92.85 |
| Invalid votes | | | 78,379 | 1.26 |
| Blank votes | | | 367,471 | 5.89 |
| Total votes | | | 6,235,741 | 100.00 |
| Registered voters/turnout | | | 8,886,195 | 70.17 |
Source: G1

Popular vote
| Doria | 53.29% |
| Haddad | 16.70% |
| Russomanno | 13.64% |
| Marta | 10.14% |
| Erundina | 3.18% |
| Olímpio | 2.02% |
| Others | 1.02% |

=== Municipal Chamber ===
| Party | Votes | % | Seats | +/– |
|---|---|---|---|---|
| Brazilian Social Democracy Party | 1,032,160 | 19.23 | 11 | ▲2 |
| Workers' Party | 853,808 | 15.91 | 9 | ▼2 |
| Brazilian Republican Party | 423,107 | 7.88 | 4 | ▲2 |
| Democrats | 279,834 | 5.21 | 4 | ▲2 |
| Brazilian Democratic Movement Party | 254,669 | 4.74 | 2 | ▼2 |
| Social Democratic Party | 244,576 | 4.56 | 4 | ▼3 |
| Green Party | 234,660 | 4.37 | 2 | ▼2 |
| Brazilian Labour Party | 219,972 | 4.10 | 2 | ▼2 |
| Socialism and Liberty Party | 184,461 | 3.44 | 2 | ▲1 |
| Brazilian Socialist Party | 169,891 | 3.17 | 3 | Steady |
| Party of the Republic | 162,335 | 3.02 | 4 | ▲1 |
| Humanist Party of Solidarity | 152,046 | 2.83 | 1 | Steady |
| National Labour Party | 147,123 | 2.74 | 1 | ▲1 |
| New Party | 140,794 | 2.62 | 1 | New |
| Progressive Party | 130,099 | 2.42 | 1 | Steady |
| Democratic Labour Party | 128,987 | 2.40 | 0 | Steady |
| Popular Socialist Party | 99,758 | 1.86 | 2 | Steady |
| Communist Party of Brazil | 83,489 | 1.56 | 0 | ▼1 |
| Social Liberal Party | 64,118 | 1.19 | 0 | Steady |
| Social Christian Party | 58,400 | 1.09 | 1 | ▲1 |
| Solidariedade | 55,004 | 1.02 | 0 | Steady |
| Sustainability Network | 47,302 | 0.88 | 0 | New |
| Republican Party of the Social Order | 39,461 | 0.74 | 1 | New |
| Christian Social Democratic Party | 32,347 | 0.60 | 0 | Steady |
| Progressive Republican Party | 30,869 | 0.58 | 0 | Steady |
| National Ecologic Party | 24,180 | 0.45 | 0 | Steady |
| Brazilian Labour Renewal Party | 21,245 | 0.40 | 0 | Steady |
| Christian Labour Party | 17,877 | 0.33 | 0 | Steady |
| Free Fatherland Party | 14,114 | 0.26 | 0 | Steady |
| United Socialist Workers' Party | 6,505 | 0.12 | 0 | Steady |
| Labour Party of Brazil | 5,028 | 0.09 | 0 | Steady |
| Brazilian Woman's Party | 5,864 | 0.11 | 0 | New |
| Brazilian Communist Party | 2,489 | 0.05 | 0 | Steady |
| Workers' Cause Party | 827 | 0.02 | 0 | Steady |
| Total | 5,367,399 | 100.00 | 55 | – |
| Valid votes | 5,367,399 | 77.29 | | |
| Invalid votes | 908,459 | 13.08 | | |
| Blank votes | 668,674 | 9.63 | | |
| Total votes | 6,944,532 | 100.00 | | |
| Registered voters/turnout | 8,886,195 | 78.15 | | |
Source: UOL
