= Nádia Campeão =

Brazilian engineer and politician

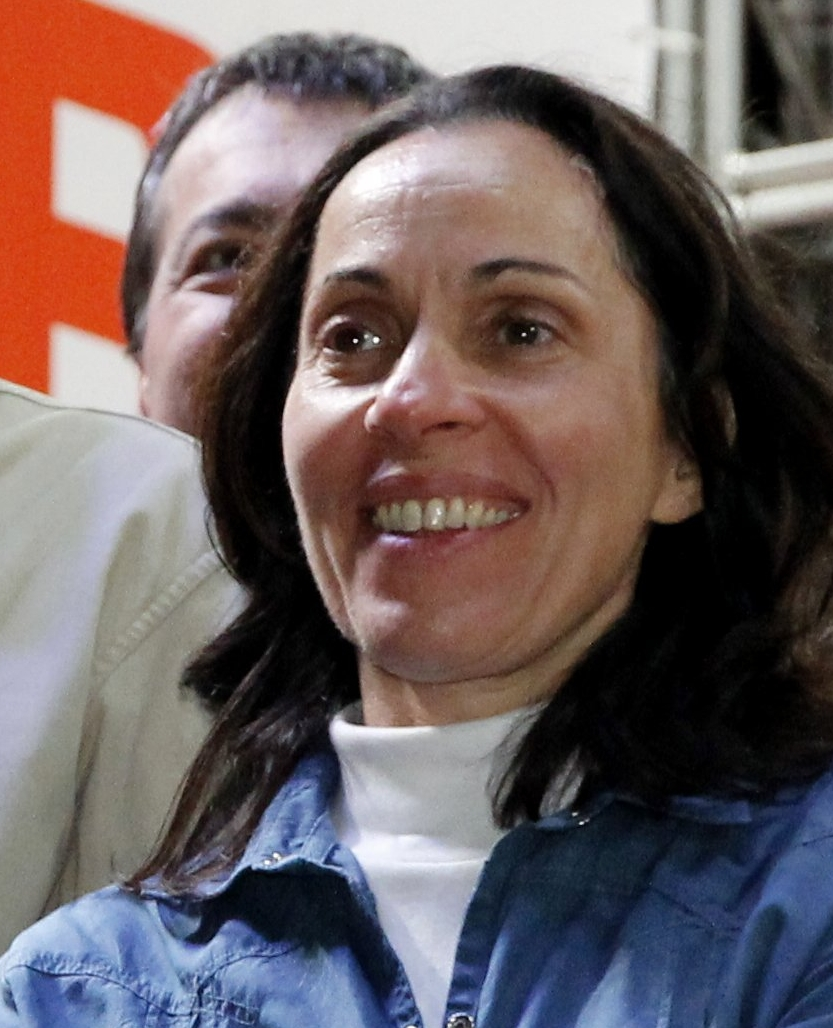
- Campeão in 2012.

Vice Mayor of São Paulo
- In office 1 January 2013 – 31 December 2016
- Mayor: Fernando Haddad
- Preceded by: Alda Marco Antônio
- Succeeded by: Bruno Covas

Municipal Secretary of Education of São Paulo
- In office 3 June 2016 – 31 December 2016
- Mayor: Fernando Haddad
- Preceded by: Gabriel Chalita
- Succeeded by: Alexandre Schneider

Personal details
- Born: Nádia Campeão; 27 February 1958 (age 68) Rio Claro, São Paulo, Brazil
- Party: PCdoB (1978–present)
- Education: Luiz de Queiroz College of Agriculture, University of São Paulo
- Profession: Agronomist engineer

Nádia Campeão (born 27 February 1958) is a Brazilian engineer and politician, member of the Communist Party of Brazil (PCdoB). She was Vice Mayor of São Paulo from 2013 to 2017, the second woman to assume this office.

== Biography ==
Graduated in agronomic engineering for the ESALQ-USP, Nádia joined the Communist Party of Brazil in 1978.

In 2001, was nominated Secretary of Sports of São Paulo by then Mayor Marta Suplicy. In 2002, along with Marta, the then Secretary of Sports of the State Lars Grael, and the Governor of São Paulo Geraldo Alckmin, officialized the candidacy of São Paulo for the 2012 Summer Olympics.

In 2006, Nádia ran for Vice Governor of São Paulo along with Aloizio Mercadante. Mercadante was defeated in the first round by José Serra of the Brazilian Social Democracy Party (PSDB). In 2012, was elected Vice Mayor with Fernando Haddad of the Workers' Party (PT).

In the next year, Campeão assumed the presidency of the organizer committee that defended São Paulo candidacy as host of Expo 2020.

Political offices
Preceded by Alda Marco Antônio	Vice Mayor of São Paulo; 2013–17	Succeeded by Bruno Covas
Preceded by Gabriel Chalita	Municipal Secretary of Education of São Paulo; 2016–17	Succeeded by Alexandre Schneider
Party political offices
Preceded by Aldo Rebelo	PCdoB nominee for Vice Mayor of São Paulo; 2012	Succeeded by Andrea Barcelos
