= José Abílio Silva de Santana =

Brazilian preacher and politician

Abílio Santana
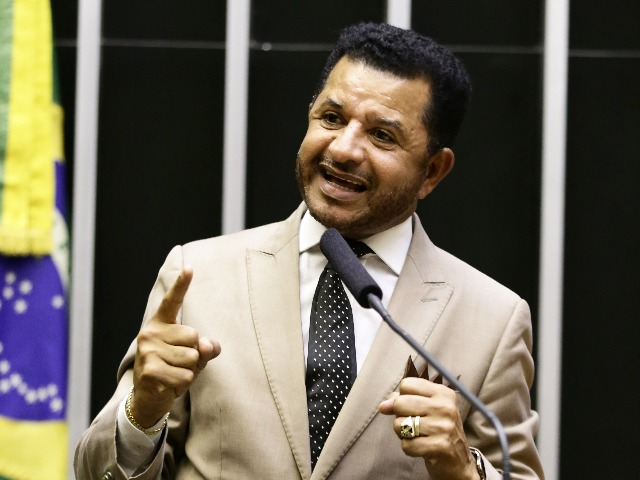

Member of the Chamber of Deputies
- In office 1 February 2019 – 1 February 2023
- Constituency: Bahia

Personal details
- Born: José Abílio Silva de Santana; 13 February 1965 (age 61) Salvador, Bahia, Brazil
- Party: PODE (since 2023)
- Other political affiliations: PRP (2003–2016); PHS (2016–2019); PL (2019–2022); PSC (2022–2023)
- Occupation: Evangelical pastor

José Abílio Silva de Santana (born 13 February 1965) popularly known as pastor Abílio Santana is a Brazilian preacher and politician of the Podemos political party. He was elected to the Brazilian chamber of Federal Deputies in 2018.

== Life and career ==
De Santana was born in Salvador in 1965. He is one of the influential preachers in the largest Pentecostal Protestant missionary congress in Brazil, the Gideões Missionários da Última Hora based in Camboriú. In 2018, he was involved in a severe auto crash in Northern Bahia and was rushed to a hospital in Casa Nova Municipality and later transferred Juazeiro. He was elected a Federal Deputy in the 2018 election of the federal deputies with total votes of 50,345 or (0.73%) cast for his party.
