= Gabriel Chalita =

Brazilian politician

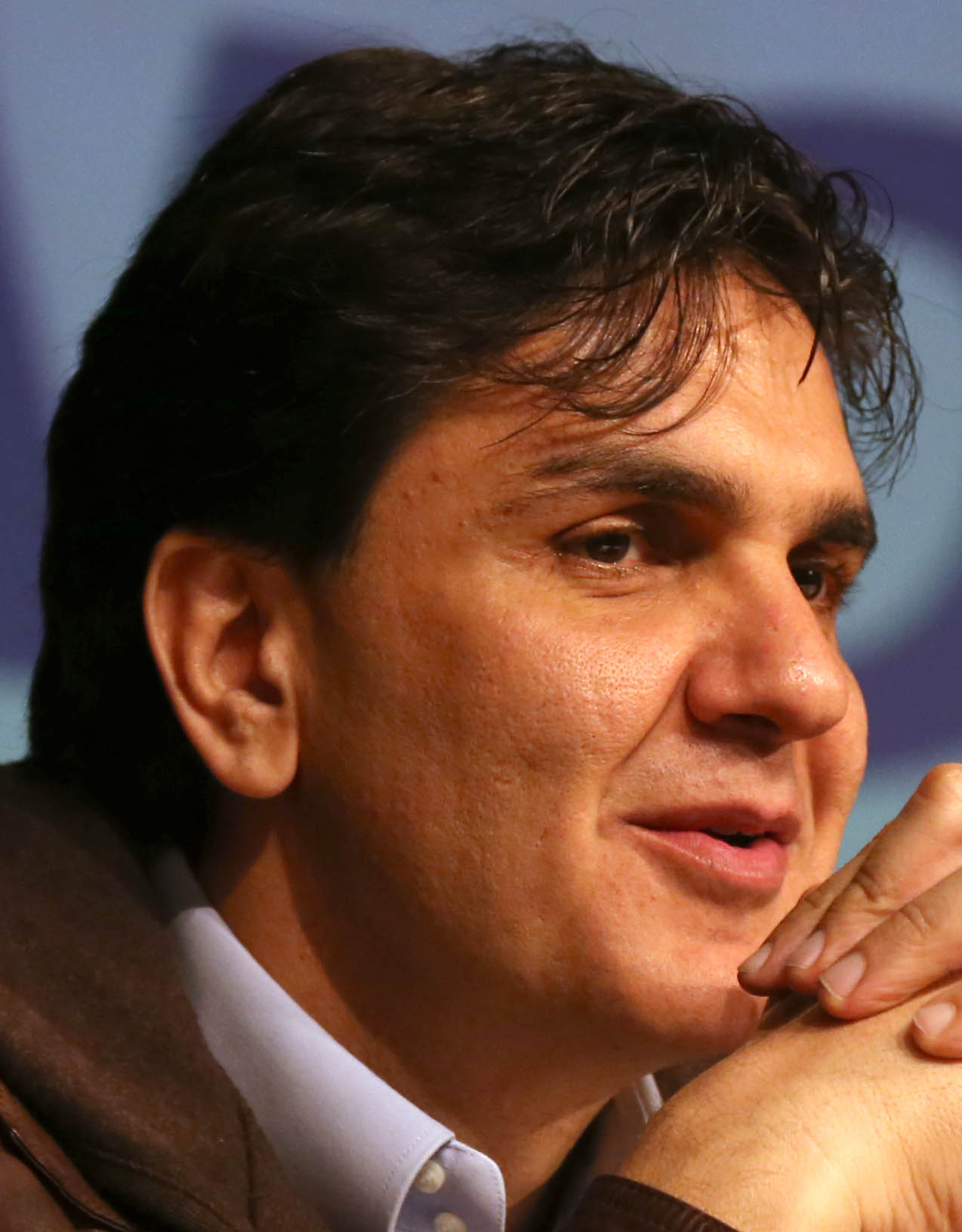

Municipal Secretary of Education of São Paulo
- In office 13 January 2015 – 1 June 2016
- Mayor: Fernando Haddad
- Preceded by: César Callegari
- Succeeded by: Nádia Campeão

Federal Deputy from São Paulo
- In office 1 February 2011 – 1 February 2015

City Councillor of São Paulo
- In office 1 January 2009 – 1 February 2011

State Secretary of Education of São Paulo
- In office 9 April 2002 – 31 March 2006
- Governor: Geraldo Alckmin
- Preceded by: Rose Neubauer
- Succeeded by: Maria Helena Guimarães de Castro

City Councillor of Cachoeira Paulista
- In office 1 January 1989 – 1 January 1993

Personal details
- Born: Gabriel Benedito Issaac Chalita; 30 April 1969 (age 57) Cachoeira Paulista, SP, Brazil
- Party: PDT (1987–1989; 2016–present)
- Other political affiliations: PSDB (1989–2009); PSB (2009–2011); PMDB (2011–2016)
- Parents: José Milhem Chalita (father); Anisse Issaac (mother)
- Education: PUC-SP (B.L) (MSSc) (M.L.) (J.D.); Salesiano University Center of São Paulo (Ph.B.)
- Profession: Professor, lawyer, jurist, writer, politician

Gabriel Benedito Issaac Chalita (Brazilian Portuguese: [ɡabɾiˈɛw ʃaˈlitɐ]; born 30 April 1969 in Cachoeira Paulista) is a Brazilian lawyer, jurist, professor, writer and politician, member of the Democratic Labor Party (PDT).

== Education ==
Gabriel Chalita was born in Cachoeira Paulista, in the state of São Paulo, to parents of Lebanese and Syrian descent. He published his first book at the age of 12. He concluded his studies of Bachelor of Laws by the Pontifical Catholic University of São Paulo (PUC-SP) in 1994, and of Philosophy by the Salesiana College of Philosophy, Sciences, and Letters of Lorena in 1989.

In 1995, defended the thesis Relations of Power in Machiavelli and La Boétie, obtaining the grade of Master in Social Science, and in 1997, with the thesis The Power in the Renaissance, obtained the grade of Master of Laws by the PUC-SP.

In the same year, defended the thesis The Seduction in the Speech in Jury Courts, obtaining the grade of Doctor in Communication and Semiotics, also by the PUC-SP. In the next year, defended the thesis Alternatives for the Independence of the city's Legislative Power, which he obtained the grade of Doctor of Law by the PUC-SP.

== Professional life ==
Currently, Chalita is professor of Mackenzie Presbyterian University, of PUC-SP, member of the Brazilian Union of Writers, of the Brazilian Academy of Education, and president of the Paulista Academy of Letters.

He presented, by the Sistema Canção Nova de Comunicação, the show Papo Aberto, broadcast on radio and TV. Currently, presents Caminhos in Redevida de Televisão, a Catholic TV broadcaster.

Acted, since his young years, in several NGOs; among them, the Latin American Youth for Democracy (JULAD). At the age of 19, was elected City Councillor in his birth city, becoming President of the City Council of Cachoeira Paulista. Also assumed the offices of Secretary of Youth, Sports and Leisure, and, posteriorly, Secretary of Education of the State of São Paulo, becoming president of the National Council of Secretaries of Education (CONSED) for two terms.

In 2008, Chalita was elected City Councillor of São Paulo, becoming the most voted candidate of the city, with 102,044 votes by the coalition PSDB/PHS.

Having his first book published at his 12, at 15 has already created a collection focused in children in catechesis. Currently has more than 80 books published, among them: Educação: a solução está no afeto, Os Dez Mandamentos da Ética, Pedagogia do Amor, Cartas entre Amigos, and O Pequeno Filósofo.

In 2010, he was elected Federal Deputy as the second most voted candidate in the state, with 560,008 for the 54th Congress (2011–2015). In the 2012 elections, he ran for Mayor of São Paulo by the Brazilian Democratic Movement Party (PMDB), but couldn't get to the second round. In the 2014 elections, decided to not run for a new term as Federal Deputy. On 13 January 2015, Chalita was nominated by mayor Fernando Haddad as Secretary of Education of São Paulo, replacing César Callegari, who resigned a day before.

In March 2016, he returned to the Democratic Labor Party (PDT), being appointed as candidate for Vice Mayor along with Haddad, but both were defeated in the first round.

=== 2016 elections ===
In the 2016 elections, Chalita was candidate for Vice Mayor for the PDT along Fernando Haddad, but obtained only 16.7% of the valid votes, being defeated by the PSDB ticket composed by João Doria for Mayor and Bruno Covas for Vice Mayor in the first round.

=== 2018 elections ===
Chalita is supposed to be candidate for Governor of São Paulo by the PDT in the 2018 elections. The president of the party, Carlos Lupi, invited him, who didn't accepted or refused his candidacy.

Political offices
Preceded by Rose Neubauer	State Secretary of Education of São Paulo; 2002–06	Succeeded by Maria Helena Guimarães de Castro
Preceded by César Callegari	Municipal Secretary of Education of São Paulo; 2015–16	Succeeded by Nádia Campeão
Party political offices
Preceded by Joaquim Grava	PDT nominee for Vice Mayor of São Paulo; 2016	Succeeded by Antônio Neto
