= Celso Russomanno =

Brazilian politician and journalist

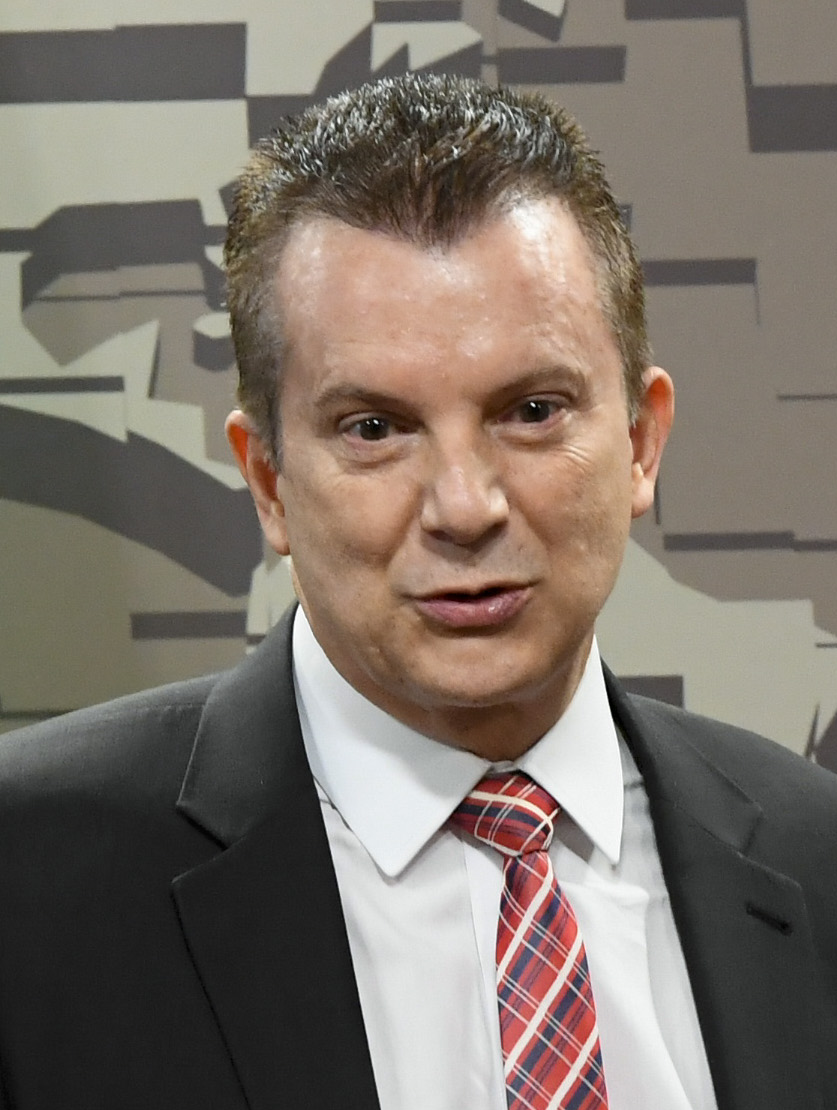
- Russomanno in 2019

Member of the Chamber of Deputies
- Incumbent
- Assumed office 1 February 2015
- Constituency: São Paulo
- In office 1 February 1995 – 1 February 2011
- Constituency: São Paulo

President of the Mercosur Parliament
- In office 1 January 2021 – 1 January 2022
- Vice President: Oscar Laborde; Gustavo Penadés; Tomás Bittar
- Preceded by: Oscar Laborde
- Succeeded by: Tomás Bittar

Personal details
- Born: Celso Ubirajara Russomanno; 20 August 1956 (age 70) São Paulo, Brazil
- Party: Republicanos (2011–present)
- Other political affiliations: PFL (1985–1994); PSDB (1994–1997); PP (1997–2011)
- Spouse(s): Adriana Torres (m. 1985; died 1990) Lovani Neuland (m. 2001)
- Children: 3
- Education: Guarulhos Integrated Colleges
- Profession: Journalist

Celso Ubirajara Russomanno (born 20 August 1956 in São Paulo) is a Brazilian reporter specialized in consumer defense and politician. He currently serves as a federal deputy from São Paulo since 2015, and previously served in Congress from 1995 to 2011. He was a candidate for mayor of São Paulo in the 2020 election.

== Career ==
Russomanno received a Bachelor of Laws from the Law School of Guarulhos. He became famous in the beginning of the 1990s as part of the popular news television show Aqui Agora, which aired from 1991 to 1997 on SBT, where he mediated consumers' complaints who felt injured by companies from various sectors. He is the author of two books on consumer defense and is also a speaker on the topic.

Russomanno ran for Federal Deputy in the 1994 election, being the most voted candidate in that year. Russomanno is president of the National Institute of Consumer Defense. The deputy also was on the TV broadcaster Rede Record in the TV programs Hoje em Dia, Cidade Alerta, and Programa da Tarde, which he presented the Patrulha do Consumidor (Consumers' Patrol), in the same format of the SBT program. In 2014, Russomanno became the most voted candidate for Federal Deputy in the country, having the second highest voting in the history with 1,524,286 votes, losing to Enéas Carneiro in 2002.

He was candidate for Mayor of Santo André in 2000 and Mayor of São Paulo in 2012 and 2016, being defeated in the first round. Despite being a long time member of the Brazilian Republican party and having close links to the IURD, Russomanno declared that he is a devout Roman Catholic.

Political offices
Preceded by Oscar Laborde	President of the Mercosur Parliament; 2021–2022	Succeeded by Tomás Bittar
Chamber of Deputies (Brazil)
Preceded by João Maia	Chair of the Consumer Defence Committee; 2021–present	Incumbent
Party political offices
New political party	Republicanos nominee for Mayor of São Paulo; 2012, 2016, 2020	Most recent
