= 2012 São Paulo mayoral election =

2012 São Paulo municipal election
- October 7, 2012 (first round); October 28, 2012 (second round)
- Opinion polls
- Turnout: 81.52% (first round); 80.01% (second round)
- Mayoral election
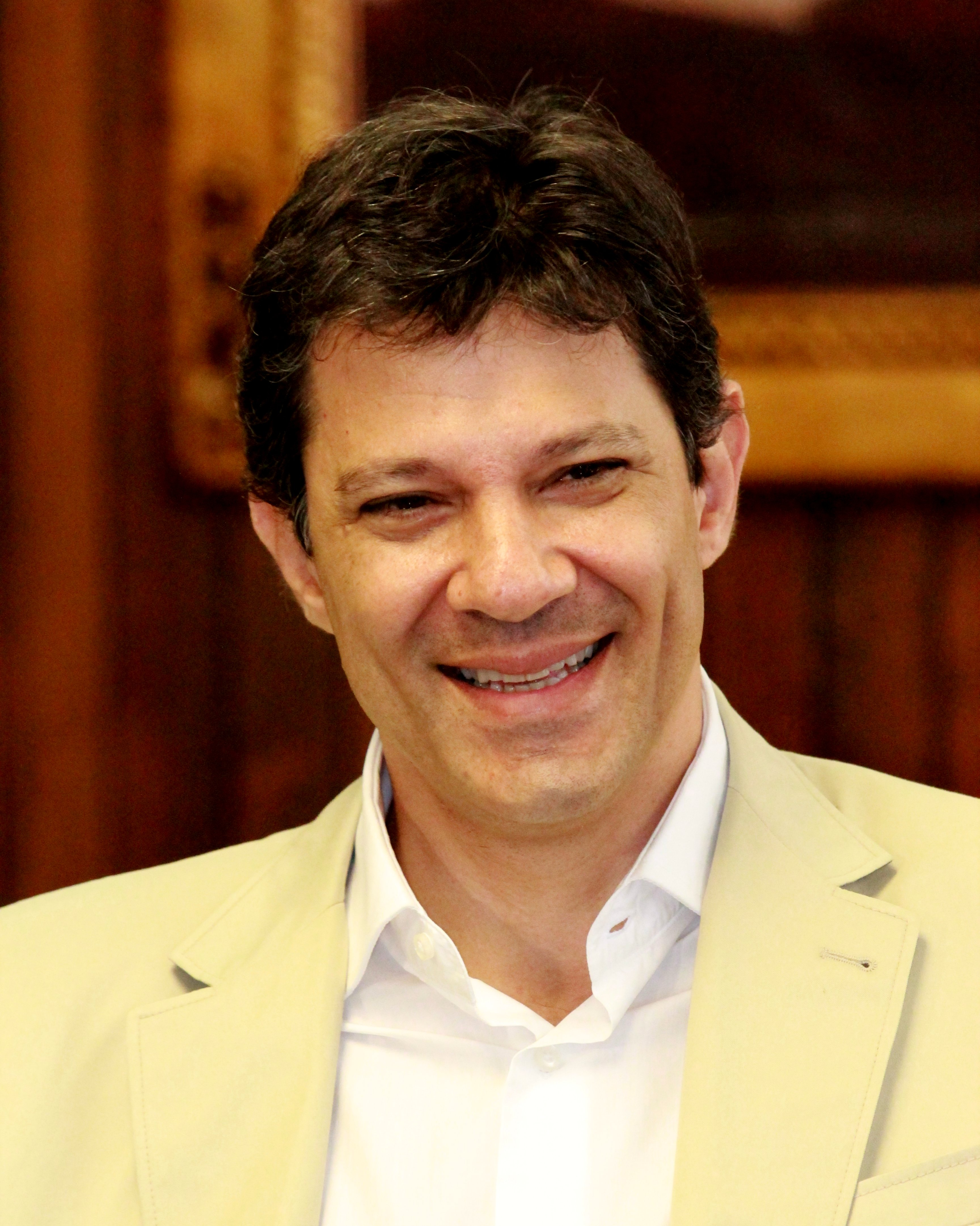

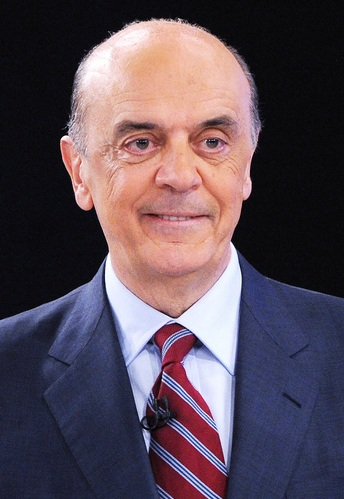
Candidate	Fernando Haddad	José Serra
Party	PT	PSDB
Running mate	Nádia Campeão	Alexandre Schneider
Popular vote	3,387,720	2,708,768
Percentage	55.57%	44.43%
- Fernando Haddad José Serra
Mayor before election
Gilberto Kassab
PSD
Elected mayor
Fernando Haddad
PT
- Parliamentary election
Party	Leader	Vote %	Seats	+/–
Municipal Chamber
PSDB	Floriano Pesaro	18.10%	9	−2
PV	Abou Anni	6.85%	4	+1
MDB	None	5.29%	4	+2
Republicanos	Atílio Francisco	5.19%	2	+1
PTB	Adilson Amadeu	5.04%	4	+1
PR	Aurélio Miguel	4.63%	3	−2
DEM	Milton Leite	3.91%	2	−6
PSB	Eliseu Gabriel	3.77%	3	+1
PCdoB	Jamil Murad	2.89%	1	−1
PSOL	None	2.06%	1	+1
PP	Wadih Mutran	1.95%	1	−1
PDT	Claudio Prado	1.71%	0	−1
This lists parties that won seats. See the complete results below.

The 2012 São Paulo municipal election took place in the city of São Paulo, with the first round taking place on 7 October 2012 and the second round taking place on 28 October 2012. Voters voted to elect the Mayor, the Vice Mayor and 55 city councillors for the administration of the city. The result was a 2nd round victory for Fernando Haddad of the Workers' Party (PT), winning 3,387,720 votes and a share of 55.57% of the popular vote, defeating José Serra of the Brazilian Social Democracy Party (PSDB), who took 2,708,768 votes and a share of 44.43% of the popular vote.

== Candidates ==
=== Candidates in runoff ===
#	Party/coalition	Mayoral candidate	Political office(s)	Vice-Mayoral candidate
13	"To Change and Renovate São Paulo"; PT, PCdoB, PP, PSB	Fernando Haddad (PT)	Minister of Education 2005–12	Nádia Campeão (PCdoB)
45	"Forward São Paulo"; PSDB, PSD, DEM, PV, PR	José Serra (PSDB)	Governor of São Paulo 2007–10; Mayor of São Paulo 2005–06; Minister of Health 1995–2002; Ministry of Planning and Budget 1995–96	Alexandre Schneider (PSD)

=== Candidates failing to make runoff ===
#	Party/coalition	Mayoral candidate	Political office(s)	Vice-Mayoral candidate
10	"For a New São Paulo"; PRB, PTB, PTN, PHS, PRP, PTdoB	Celso Russomanno (PRB)	Federal Deputy from São Paulo 1995–2011	Luiz Flavio D'Urso (PTB)
12	Democratic Labour Party (PDT)	Paulo Pereira da Silva (PDT)	Federal Deputy from São Paulo since 2007	Joaquim Gava (PDT)
15	"São Paulo in First Place"; PMDB, PSC, PTC, PSL	Gabriel Chalita (PMDB)	Federal Deputy from São Paulo since 2011; City Councillor of São Paulo 2009–11; State Secretary of Education of São Paulo 2002–06; City Councillor of Cachoeira Paulista 1989–93	Marianne Pinotti (PMDB)
16	United Socialist Workers' Party (PSTU)	Ana Luiza (PSTU)	Federal public employee	Wilson Ribeiro (PSTU)
23	"A Green Light for São Paulo"; PPS, PMN	Soninha Francine (PPS)	Sub-Mayor of Lapa 2009–10; City Councillor of São Paulo 2005–09	Lucas Albano (PMN)
27	Social Democratic Christian Party (PSDC)	José Maria Eymael (PSDC)	PSDC National President since 1997; Federal Deputy from São Paulo 1986–95	Lindberg de Morais (PSDC)
28	Brazilian Labour Renewal Party (PRTB)	Levy Fidelix (PRTB)	PRTB National President since 1994	Luiz Duarte (PRTB)
29	Workers' Cause Party (PCO)	Anaí Caproni (PCO)	Co-founder of the Workers' Cause Party	Rafael Dantas (PCO)
50	"Left-Wing Front"; PSOL, PCB	Carlos Giannazi (PSOL)	State Deputy of São Paulo since 2007; City Councillor of São Paulo 2001–07	Edmilson Costa (PCB)
54	Free Fatherland Party (PPL)	Miguel Manso (PPL)	Engineer and politician	Marielza Milani (PPL)

== Debates ==
=== First round ===
Date	Host	Moderator	José Serra (PSDB)	Fernando Haddad (PT)	Celso Russomanno (PRB)	Gabriel Chalita (PMDB)	Soninha Francine (PPS)	Carlos Giannazi (PSOL)	Paulo Pereira (PDT)	Levy Fidelix (PRTB)	Ana Luiza (PSTU)	Miguel Manso (PPL)	Eymael (PSDC)	Anaí Caproni (PCO)
2 August 2012	TV Bandeirantes	Fábio Pannunzio	Present	Present	Present	Present	Present	Present	Present	Present	Not invited	Not invited	Not invited	Not invited
3 September 2012	RedeTV!, Folha de S. Paulo	Kennedy Alencar	Present	Present	Present	Present	Present	Present	Present	Present	Not invited	Not invited	Not invited	Not invited
17 September 2012	TV Cultura, Estadão, YouTube	Mario Sergio Conti	Present	Present	Present	Present	Present	Present	Present	Present	Not invited	Not invited	Not invited	Not invited
24 September 2012	TV Gazeta, Portal Terra	Maria Lydia Flandoli	Present	Present	Present	Present	Present	Present	Present	Present	Not invited	Not invited	Not invited	Not invited
1 October 2012	Rede Record	Cancelled												
4 October 2012	Rede Globo	Cancelled												

=== Second round ===
Date	Host	Moderator	Fernando Haddad (PT)	José Serra (PSDB)
N/A	TV Cultura	Rejected		
15 October 2012	TV Gazeta	Rejected		
18 October 2012	TV Bandeirantes	Fábio Pannunzio	Present	Present
21 October 2012	RedeTV!	Rejected		
22 October 2012	Rede Record	Cancelled		
24 October 2012	SBT, UOL	Carlos Nascimento	Present	Present
26 October 2012	Rede Globo, G1	César Tralli	Present	Present

== Opinion polls ==
=== First round ===
Polling aggregates
- Active candidates
- José Serra (PSDB)
- Fernando Haddad (PT)
- Celso Russomanno (PRB)
- Gabriel Chalita (PMDB)
- Soninha Francine (PPS)
- Carlos Giannazi (PSOL)
- Paulo Pereira (PDT)
- Others
- Abstentions/Undecided

View source data.

Pollster/client(s)	Date(s) conducted	Sample size	Serra PSDB	Alckmin PSDB	Haddad PT	Suplicy PT	Russomanno PRB	Chalita PMDB	Francine PPS	Giannazi PSOL	Valente PSOL	Pereira PDT	Kassab DEM	Others	Abst. Undec.	Lead
2012 election	7 Oct	–	30.75%	–	28.98%	–	21.60%	13.60%	2.65%	1.02%	–	0.63%	–	0.76%	12.78%	1.77%
Datafolha	5–6 Oct	3,959	24%	–	20%	–	23%	11%	4%	1%	–	1%	–	2%	14%	1%
Ibope	4–6 Oct	1,204	22%	–	22%	–	22%	11%	4%	1%	–	1%	–	1%	16%	Tie
Datafolha	2–3 Oct	2,099	23%	–	19%	–	25%	10%	4%	1%	–	1%	–	1%	14%	2%
Ibope	29 Sep–2 Oct	1,204	19%	–	18%	–	27%	11%	4%	1%	–	0%	–	0%	20%	8%
Datafolha	26–27 Sep	1,799	22%	–	18%	–	30%	9%	4%	1%	–	1%	–	1%	14%	8%
Ibope	22–24 Sep	1,204	17%	–	18%	–	34%	7%	4%	1%	–	1%	–	0%	18%	16%
Vox Populi	19–21 Sep	2,000	17%	–	17%	–	34%	5%	2%	0%	–	1%	–	1%	23%	17%
Datafolha	18–19 Sep	1,802	21%	–	15%	–	35%	8%	4%	1%	–	1%	–	1%	13%	14%
Ibope	10–12 Sep	1,001	19%	–	15%	–	35%	6%	4%	1%	–	1%	–	0%	19%	16%
Datafolha	10–11 Sep	1,221	20%	–	17%	–	32%	8%	5%	1%	–	1%	–	0%	16%	15%
Datafolha	3–4 Sep	1,078	21%	–	16%	–	35%	7%	5%	1%	–	1%	–	2%	12%	14%
Ibope	28–30 Aug	1,001	20%	–	16%	–	31%	5%	4%	0%	–	1%	–	2%	23%	11%
Vox Populi	28–29 Aug	1,069	22%	–	14%	–	31%	7%	4%	1%	–	2%	–	1%	17%	9%
Vox Populi	28–29 Aug	1,070	22%	–	14%	–	31%	7%	4%	1%	–	2%	–	0%	17%	9%
Datafolha	20 Aug	1,000	27%	–	8%	–	31%	6%	5%	0%	–	4%	–	1%	16%	4%
Ibope	13–15 Aug	805	26%	–	9%	–	26%	5%	5%	1%	–	5%	–	1%	22%	Tie
Ibope	31 Jul–2 Aug	805	26%	–	6%	–	25%	5%	7%	1%	–	5%	–	2%	23%	1%
Datafolha	19–20 Jul	1,075	30%	–	7%	–	26%	6%	7%	1%	–	5%	–	2%	17%	4%
Datafolha	25–26 Jun	1,081	31%	–	6%	–	24%	6%	6%	1%	–	3%	–	6%	16%	7%
Datafolha	13–14 Jun	1,077	30%	–	8%	–	21%	6%	8%	1%	–	5%	–	8%	12%	9%
Ibope	13–14 Jun	1,077	31%	–	3%	–	16%	6%	7%	1%	–	5%	–	9%	21%	15%
2008 election	5 Oct	–	–	22.48%	–	32.79%	–	–	4.19%	–	0.67%	–	33.61%	6.27%	6.67%	0.82%

=== Second round ===
Polling aggregates
- Active candidates
- Fernando Haddad (PT)
- José Serra (PSDB)
- Abstentions/Undecided

View source data.

Pollster/client(s)	Date(s) conducted	Sample size	Haddad PT	Suplicy PT	Serra PSDB	Kassab DEM	Abst. Undec.	Lead
2012 election	28 Oct	–	55.27%	–	44.43%	–	11.58%	10.84%
Ibope	26–27 Oct	1,204	50%	–	35%	–	15%	15%
Datafolha	26–27 Oct	3,992	48%	–	34%	–	18%	14%
Ibope	22–24 Oct	1,204	49%	–	36%	–	15%	13%
Datafolha	23–24 Oct	2,084	49%	–	34%	–	17%	15%
Datafolha	17–18 Oct	2,098	49%	–	32%	–	19%	17%
Ibope	15–17 Oct	1,204	49%	–	33%	–	18%	16%
Ibope	9–11 Oct	1,204	48%	–	37%	–	15%	11%
Datafolha	9–10 Oct	2,090	47%	–	37%	–	16%	10%
2008 election	26 Oct	–	–	39.28%	–	60.72%	6.31%	21.44%

== Results ==
=== Mayor ===
Candidate	Running mate	Party	First round		Second round	
Candidate	Running mate	Party	Votes	%	Votes	%
Fernando Haddad	Nádia Campeão (PCdoB)	PT	1,776,317	28.98	3,387,720	55.57
José Serra	Alexandre Schneider (PSD)	PSDB	1,884,849	30.75	2,708,768	44.43
Celso Russomanno	Luiz Flavio D'Urso (PTB)	PRB	1,324,021	21.60		
Gabriel Chalita	Marianne Pinotti	PMDB	833,255	13.60		
Soninha Francine	Lucas Albano (PMN)	PPS	162,384	2.65		
Carlos Giannazi	Edmilson Costa (PCB)	PSOL	62,431	1.02		
Paulo Pereira da Silva	Joaquim Grava	PDT	38,750	0.63		
Levy Fidelix	Luiz Duarte	PRTB	19,800	0.32		
Ana Luiza	Wilson Ribeiro	PSTU	12,823	0.21		
Miguel Manso	Marielza Milani	PPL	7,272	0.12		
José Maria Eymael	Lindberg de Morais	PSDC	5,382	0.09		
Anaí Caproni	Rafael Dantas	PCO	1,373	0.02		
Total			6,128,657	100.00	6,096,488	100.00
Valid votes			6,128,657	87.22	6,096,488	88.40
Invalid votes			516,384	7.35	500,578	7.26
Blank votes			381,407	5.43	299,224	4.34
Total votes			7,026,448	100.00	6,896,290	100.00
Registered voters/turnout			8,619,170	81.52	8,619,170	80.01
Source: G1

Popular vote (first round)
Serra	30.75%
Haddad	28.98%
Russomanno	21.60%
Chalita	13.60%
Others	5.06%

Popular vote (second round)
Haddad	55.57%
Serra	44.43%

=== Municipal Chamber ===
Party	Votes	%	Seats	+/–
Workers' Party	1,122,486	19.65	11	Steady
Brazilian Social Democracy Party	1,033,500	18.10	9	▼2
Social Democratic Party	523,918	9.17	7	New
Green Party	391,259	6.85	4	▲1
Brazilian Democratic Movement Party	302,164	5.29	4	▲2
Brazilian Republican Party	296,230	5.19	2	▲1
Brazilian Labour Party	287,786	5.04	4	▲1
Party of the Republic	264,636	4.63	3	▼2
Democrats	223,284	3.91	2	▼6
Brazilian Socialist Party	215,519	3.77	3	▲1
Popular Socialist Party	213,356	3.74	2	Steady
Communist Party of Brazil	164,969	2.89	1	▼1
Socialism and Liberty Party	117,475	2.06	1	▲1
Progressive Party	111,441	1.95	1	▼1
Democratic Labour Party	97,610	1.71	0	▼1
Humanist Party of Solidarity	94,298	1.65	1	▲1
Social Christian Party	54,279	0.95	0	Steady
National Labour Party	51,373	0.90	0	Steady
Progressive Republican Party	29,988	0.53	0	Steady
Labour Party of Brazil	20,462	0.36	0	Steady
Free Fatherland Party	18,825	0.33	0	Steady
Social Liberal Party	17,834	0.31	0	Steady
Christian Social Democratic Party	14,347	0.25	0	Steady
United Socialist Workers' Party	12,091	0.21	0	Steady
Party of National Mobilization	10,066	0.18	0	Steady
Brazilian Labour Renewal Party	9,680	0.17	0	Steady
Christian Labour Party	7,412	0.13	0	Steady
Workers' Cause Party	2,759	0.05	0	Steady
Brazilian Communist Party	2,317	0.04	0	Steady
Total	5,711,364	100.00	55	–
Valid votes	5,711,364	81.28		
Invalid votes	573,524	8.16		
Blank votes	741,560	10.55		
Total votes	7,026,448	100.00		
Registered voters/turnout	8,619,170	81.52		
Source: UOL
