= 2008 São Paulo mayoral election =

2008 São Paulo municipal election
- October 5, 2008 (first round); October 26, 2008 (second round)
- Turnout: 84.37% (first round); 82.46% (second round)
- Mayoral election
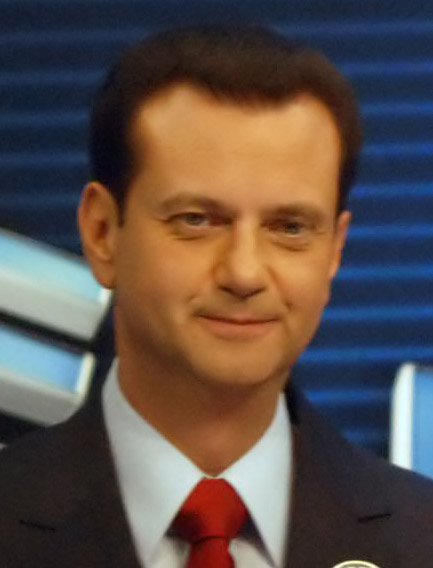

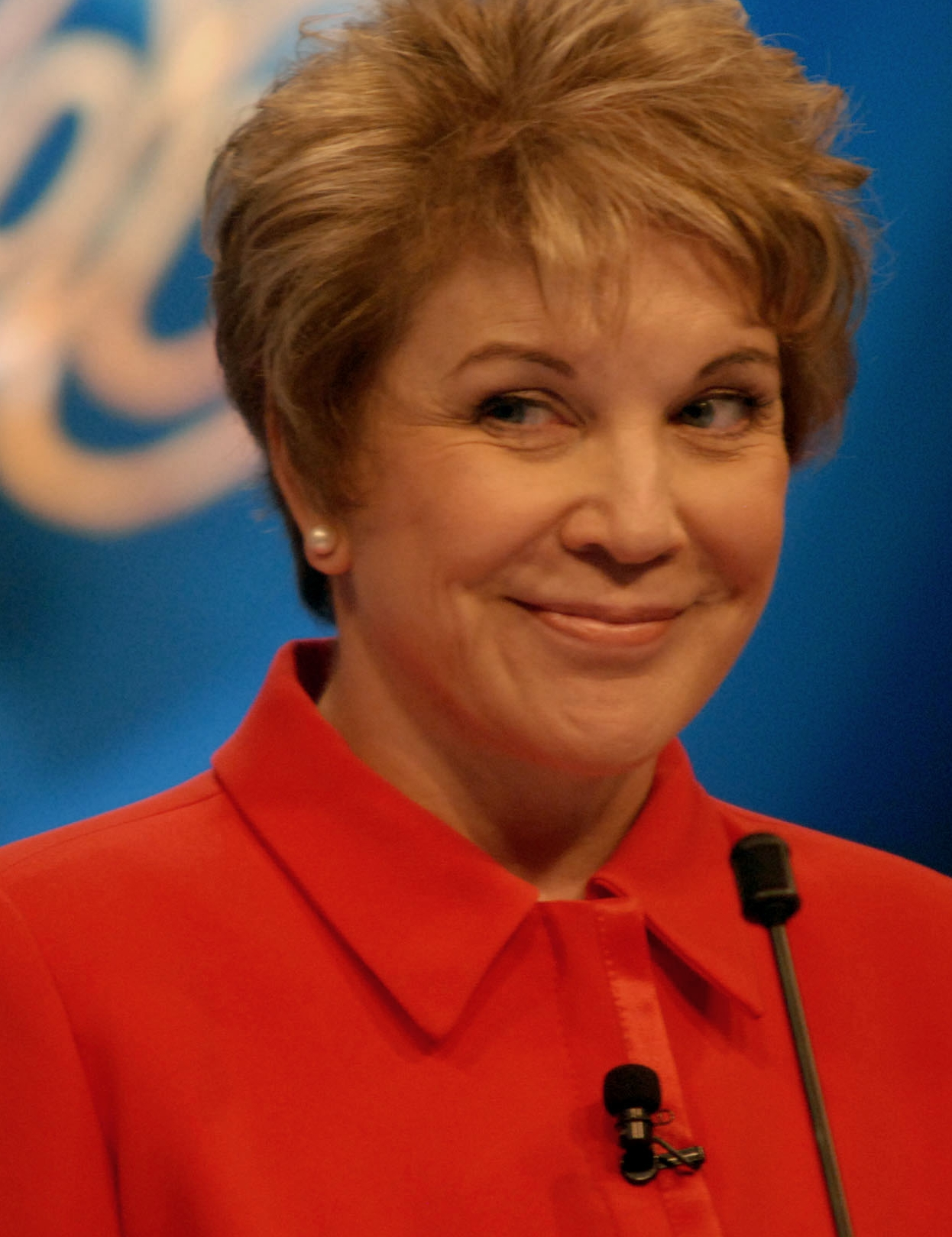
Candidate	Gilberto Kassab	Marta Suplicy
Party	DEM	PT
Running mate	Alda Marco Antônio	Aldo Rebelo
Popular vote	3,790,558	2,452,527
Percentage	60.72%	39.28%
- Gilberto Kassab Marta Suplicy
Mayor before election
Gilberto Kassab
DEM
Elected mayor
Gilberto Kassab
DEM

The 2008 São Paulo municipal election took place in the city of São Paulo, with the first round taking place on 5 October and the second round taking place on 26 October 2008. Voters voted to elect the Mayor, the Vice Mayor, and 55 City Councillors for the administration of the city. The result was a 2nd round victory for incumbent Mayor Gilberto Kassab of the Democrats (DEM), who had previously assumed office after the resignation of José Serra, who went to run for governor in the 2006 São Paulo gubernatorial election., winning 3,790,558 votes and a share of 60,72% of the popular vote, defeating Marta Suplicy, of the Worker's Party (PT), who took 2,452,527 votes and a share of 39,28% of the popular vote.

== Candidates ==
=== Candidates in runoff ===
#	Party/coalition	Mayoral candidate	Political office(s)	Vice-Mayoral candidate
13	"A New Attitude for São Paulo"; PT, PRB, PTN, PCdoB, PSB, PDT	Marta Suplicy (PT)	Minister of Tourism 2007–08; Mayor of São Paulo 2001–05; Federal Deputy from São Paulo 1995–99	Aldo Rebelo (PCdoB)
25	"São Paulo in the Right Way"; DEM, PMDB, PR, PV, PSC, PRP	Gilberto Kassab (DEM)	Mayor of São Paulo since 2006; Vice Mayor of São Paulo 2005–06; Federal Deputy from São Paulo 1999–2005; State Deputy of São Paulo 1995–99; City Councillor of São Paulo 1993–95	Alda Marco Antônio (PMDB)

=== Candidates failing to make runoff ===
#	Party/coalition	Mayoral candidate	Political office(s)	Vice-Mayoral candidate
11	Progressive Party (PP)	Paulo Maluf (PP)	Federal Deputy from São Paulo 2007–18, 1983–87; Mayor of São Paulo 1993–97, 1969–71; Governor of São Paulo 1979–82; President of the Federal Savings Bank 1967–69	Aline Corrêa (PP)
21	Brazilian Communist Party (PCB)	Edmilson Costa (PCB)		Fernanda Mendes (PCB)
23	Popular Socialist Party (PPS)	Soninha Francine (PPS)	City Councillor of São Paulo 2005–06	João Batista de Andrade (PPS)
27	Brazilian Labour Renewal Party (PRTB)	Levy Fidelix (PRTB)	PRTB National President since 1994	Marcelo Ayres Duarte (PRTB)
29	Workers' Cause Party (PCO)	Anaí Caproni (PCO)		Roberto Gerbi (PCO)
33	Party of National Mobilization (PMN)	Renato Reichmann (PMN)		Lucas Albano (PMN)
36	"Penny Against the Million"; PTC, PTdoB	Ciro Moura (PTC)		Antônio Rodrigues Júnior (PTdoB)
45	"São Paulo in the Best Direction"; PSDB, PTB, PSL, PSDC, PHS	Geraldo Alckmin (PSDB)	Governor of São Paulo 2001–06; Vice Governor of São Paulo 1995–2001; Federal Deputy from São Paulo 1987–94; State Deputy of São Paulo 1983–87; Mayor of Pindamonhangaba 1977–82; City Councillor of Pindamonhangaba 1973–77	Campos Machado (PTB)
50	"Left-Wing Alternatives for São Paulo"; PSOL, PSTU	Ivan Valente (PSOL)	Federal Deputy from São Paulo since 1995; State Deputy of São Paulo 1987–95	Carlos Giannazi (PSOL)

== Results ==
=== Mayor ===
Candidate	Running mate	Party	First round		Second round	
Candidate	Running mate	Party	Votes	%	Votes	%
Gilberto Kassab (incumbent)	Alda Marco Antônio (PMDB)	DEM	2,140,423	33.61	3,790,559	60.72
Marta Suplicy	Aldo Rebelo (PCdoB)	PT	2,088,329	32.79	2,452,527	39.28
Geraldo Alckmin	Campos Machado (PTB)	PSDB	1,431,670	22.48		
Paulo Maluf	Aline Corrêa	PP	376,734	5.91		
Soninha Francine	João Batista de Andrade	PPS	266,978	4.19		
Ivan Valente	Carlos Giannazi	PSOL	42,616	0.67		
Renato Reichmann	Lucas Albano	PMN	7,234	0.11		
Levy Fidelix	Marcelo Ayres Duarte	PRTB	5,518	0.09		
Edmilson Costa	Fernanda Mendes	PCB	4,300	0.07		
Ciro Moura	Antônio Rodrigues Júnior (PTdoB)	PTC	3,825	0.06		
Anaí Caproni	Roberto Gerbi	PCO	1,656	0.03		
Total			6,369,283	100.00	6,243,086	100.00
Valid votes			6,369,283	92.08	6,243,086	92.35
Invalid votes			316,744	4.58	339,962	5.03
Blank votes			230,717	3.34	176,880	2.62
Total votes			6,916,744	100.00	6,759,928	100.00
Registered voters/turnout			8,198,282	84.37	8,198,282	82.46

Popular vote (first round)
Kassab	33.61%
Suplicy	32.79%
Alckmin	22.48%
Maluf	5.91%
Francine	4.19%
Others	1.03%

Popular vote (second round)
Kassab	60.72%
Suplicy	39.28%

=== City Councillors ===
Candidate	Party	Voting	
Candidate	Party	Total	Percentage
Gabriel Chalita	PSDB	102,048	1.70%
Goulart	PMDB	90,054	1.50%
Netinho de Paula	PCdoB	84,406	1.41%
Milton Leite	DEM	80,051	1.33%
Mara Gabrilli	PSDB	79,912	1.33%
Senival	PT	66,139	1.10%
Arselino Tatto	PT	59,292	0.99%
José Police Neto	PSDB	54,726	0.91%
Aurélio Miguel	PR	50,804	0.85%
Carlos Alberto Bezerra Jr.	PSDB	50,536	0.84%
Antônio Donato	PT	50,388	0.84%
Celso Jatene	PTB	49,777	0.83%
Roberto Tripoli	PV	45,570	0.76%
Antônio Carlos Rodrigues	PR	43,601	0.73%
Adilson Amadeu	PTB	41,686	0.69%
Marcelo Aguiar	PSC	41,506	0.69%
Jooji Hato	PMDB	40,847	0.68%
Marta Costa	DEM	39,192	0.65%
Marco Aurélio Cunha	DEM	38,421	0.64%
Francisco Chagas	PT	37,878	0.63%
Domingos Dissei	DEM	37,739	0.63%
Paulo Frange	PTB	36,881	0.61%
Toninho Paiva	PR	35,535	0.59%
Adolfo Quintas	PSDB	34,209	0.57%
João Antônio	PT	33,899	0.56%
Alfredinho	PT	33,417	0.56%
Juscelino	PSDB	32,484	0.54%
Gilson Barreto	PSDB	32,079	0.53%
Floriano Pesaro	PSDB	31,733	0.53%
Eliseu Gabriel	PSB	31,602	0.53%
Souza Santos	PSDB	31,352	0.52%
Cláudio Prado	PDT	31,014	0.52%
Noemi Nonato	PSB	30,734	0.51%
Juliana Cardoso	PT	30,607	0.51%
Ítalo Cardoso	PT	30,541	0.51%
José Américo	PT	30,027	0.50%
Kamia	DEM	29,915	0.50%
Wadih Mutran	PP	29,039	0.48%
Missionary José Olimpio	PP	28,921	0.48%
Jamil Murad	PCdoB	28,145	0.47%
Zelão	PT	28,085	0.47%
Ricardo Teixeira	PSDB	27,248	0.45%
Chico Macena	PT	26,513	0.44%
Agnaldo Timóteo	PR	26,180	0.44%
José Luiz Penna	PV	25,820	0.43%
Atílio Francisco	PRB	25,684	0.43%
Carlos Apolinário	DEM	25,609	0.43%
Sandra Tadeu	DEM	25,173	0.42%
Dalton Silvano	PSDB	24,084	0.40%
Gilberto Natalini	DEM	23,872	0.40%
Marcos Cintra	PR	22,881	0.38%
Abou Anni	PV	22,615	0.38
Cláudio Fonseca	PPS	21,038	0.35%
Milton Ferreira	PPS	14,874	0.25%
