= 2026 São Paulo general election =

- Gubernatorial election
- 4 October 2026
- Opinion polls
- Registered: 34,081,699
- Turnout: 77.44% (▼0.93 pp)
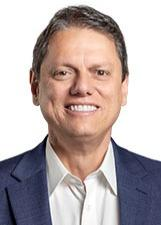

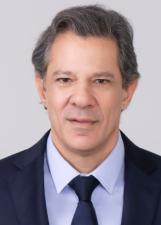
Candidate	Tarcísio de Freitas	Fernando Haddad
Party	Republicanos	PT
Alliance	Coragem para Seguir Avançando	Desperta São Paulo
Running mate	Felicio Ramuth (MDB)	Márcio França (PSB)
Popular vote	14,491,874	8,423,656
Percentage	62.65%	36.42%
Governor before election
Tarcísio de Freitas
Republicanos
Elected Governor
Tarcísio de Freitas
Republicanos

The 2026 São Paulo general election were held on 4 October 2026 in the Brazilian state of São Paulo. Voters elected a Governor, Vice Governor, two Senators, 70 representatives for the Chamber of Deputies, and 94 Legislative Assembly members.

Incumbent governor Tarcísio de Freitas of the Republicans was re-elected in a landslide to a second term in the first round, defeating Fernando Haddad. This was a rematch of the 2022 São Paulo general election. Freitas was first elected in 2022 with 55.27% of the vote, defeating Haddad in a runoff. Incumbent senators Mara Gabrilli of the Social Democratic Party (PSD) and Alexandre Giordano of the Brazilian Democratic Movement (MDB) are also eligible to run for reelection.

== Background ==
=== Election procedure ===
Note: This section only presents the main dates of the 2026 electoral calendar, check the TSE official website (in Portuguese) and other official sources for detailed information.

Electoral calendar
15 May	Start of crowdfunding of candidates
20 July to 5 August	Party conventions for choosing candidates and coalitions
16 August to 1 October	Period of exhibition of free electoral propaganda on radio, television and on the internet related to the first round
4 October	First round of 2026 elections
9 October to 23 October	Period of exhibition of free electoral propaganda on radio, television and on the internet related to a possible second round
25 October	Possible second round of 2026 elections
until 19 December	Delivery of electoral diplomas for those who were elected in the 2026 elections by the Brazilian Election Justice

== Gubernatorial candidates ==
No.	Governor			Vice Governor			Coalition Parties	Ref.
No.	Candidate	Party Federation	Relevant offices	Candidate	Party Federation	Relevant offices	Coalition Parties	Ref.
10	Tarcísio de Freitas; Tarcísio Gomes de Freitas	Republicanos	Director-General of the National Department of Transport Infrastructure of Brazil (2014–2015); Minister of Infrastructure of Brazil (2019–2022); Governor of São Paulo (2023–2026).	Felicio Ramuth; Felício Ramuth	MDB	Mayor of São José dos Campos (2017–2022); Vice Governor of São Paulo (2023–2026).	Coragem para Seguir Avançando (Republicanos, MDB, PL, PSD, UPB (UNIÃO and PP), Fed. Renovação Solidária (PRD and Solidariedade), Democrata and Avante)	
13	Fernando Haddad; Fernando Haddad	PT; FE Brasil	Minister of Education of Brazil (2005–2012); Mayor of São Paulo (2013–2017); Minister of Finance of Brazil (2023–2026).	Márcio França; Márcio Luiz França Gomes	PSB	Mayor of São Vicente (1997–2004); Member of the Chamber of Deputies for São Paulo (2007–2015); State Secretary for Sports, Leisure and Tourism of São Paulo (2015–2018); State Secretary for Development of São Paulo (2015–2018); Vice Governor of São Paulo (2015–2018); Governor of São Paulo (2018–2019); Minister of Ports and Airports of Brazil (2023); Minister of Entrepreneurship, Microenterprise and Small Business of Brazil (2023–2026).	Desperta São Paulo (FE Brasil (PT, PCdoB and PV), PSB, Fed. PSOL REDE (PSOL and REDE) and PDT)	
16	Vera Lúcia Salgado; Vera Lúcia Pereira da Silva Salgado	PSTU	No previous office	Fabio Bosco; Fabio José Bosco	PSTU	No previous office	No coalition	
21	Carlos Machado; Carlos Alberto Machado	PCB	No previous office	Felipe Queiroz; Felipe de Oliveira Queiroz	PCB	No previous office	No coalition	
29	Izadora Dias; Izadora Dias	PCO	No previous office	Nivaldo Orlandi; Nivaldo Orlandi	PCO	No previous office	No coalition	
80	Vivian Mendes; Vivian Mendes da Silva	UP	No previous office	Cris Damasio; Maria Cristina Damasio de Almeida	UP	No previous office	No coalition	

=== Declined or withdrew ===
==== If Freitas had run for president ====
- Ricardo Nunes (MDB) – businessman, incumbent Mayor of São Paulo (since 2021) and former City Councilor of São Paulo (2013–2020).
- Gilberto Kassab (PSD) – economist and civil engineer, State Secretary of Government and Institutional Relations of São Paulo (2023–2026), former Mayor of São Paulo (2006–2012), and former Minister of Science, Technology and Communications of Brazil (2016–2019).
- Felicio Ramuth (MDB) – administrator and businessman, incumbent Vice Governor of São Paulo (since 2023) and former Mayor of São José dos Campos (2017–2022).
- André do Prado (PL) – systems analyst, incumbent President of the Legislative Assembly of São Paulo (since 2023) and of the Legislative Assembly of São Paulo of (since 2011), and former Mayor of Guararema (2005–2008).
- Guilherme Derrite (PP) – former Military Police captain, Member of the Chamber of Deputies for São Paulo (since 2019), and former State Secretary of Public Security of São Paulo (2023–2025).

==== Withdrawn candidates ====
- Geraldo Alckmin (PSB) – anesthesiologist, incumbent Vice President of Brazil and former Minister of Development, Industry, Trade and Services of Brazil (2023–2026), and former Governor of São Paulo (2001–2006; 2011–2018).
- Márcio França (PSB) – lawyer, Minister of Entrepreneurship, Microenterprise and Small Business, former Governor of São Paulo (2018–2019), and former Vice Governor of São Paulo (2015–2018).
- Erika Hilton (PSOL) – activist and politician, Member of the Chamber of Deputies for São Paulo (since 2023), and former City Councilor of São Paulo (2021–2023).
- Kim Kataguiri (MISSÃO) – Member of the Chamber of Deputies for São Paulo (2019–2026). On June 20, 2026, Kataguiri announced that he would seek reelection to the Chamber of Deputies rather than run for governor. He also offered to serve as Minister of Finance in the event of a victory by Renan Santos, stating that he would focus on assembling an economic team for his party colleague. At the time, MISSÃO had not yet decided whether to remain neutral in the São Paulo gubernatorial election or field its own ticket.
- Paulo Serra (PSDB) – former Mayor of Santo André (2017–2025). Serra withdrew from the gubernatorial race and instead decided to run for the Chamber of Deputies.
- Camilo Terra (PCB) – civil servant. Terra withdrew from the race after encountering issues with the Federal Public Prosecutor's Office and was replaced by Carlos Machado as the party's gubernatorial candidate.

==== Rejected candidates ====
- Edjane Lima (Act) – policewoman. On September 18, 2026, Lima′s candidacy for the São Paulo governorship was rejected by the Regional Electoral Court (TRE). The Act party in São Paulo withdrew from the electoral race, citing a lack of funds to finance the campaign.

== Senatorial candidates ==
2026 São Paulo senatorial election
- 4 October 2026 (one-only round)
- Opinion polls
- Registered: 34,081,699
- Turnout: 77.44% (▼0.93 pp)
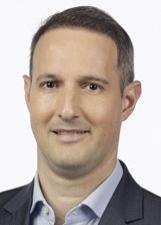

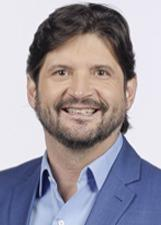

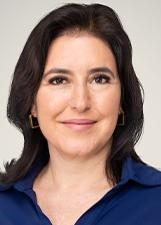
Candidate	Guilherme Derrite	André do Prado	Simone Tebet
Party	PP	PL	PSB
Alliance	Coragem para Seguir Avançando	Coragem para Seguir Avançando	Desperta São Paulo
Popular vote	13,273,880	12,703,089	8,342,968
Percentage	30.59%	29.28%	19.23%
Senators before election
Alexandre Giordano and Mara Gabrilli
PODE and PSD
Elected Senators
Guilherme Derrite and André do Prado
PP and PL

The 2026 São Paulo Senatorial election were held in a single round on 4 October 2026 to renew two-thirds of the state's representation in the Federal Senate of Brazil. The seats held by Mara Gabrilli of the Social Democratic Party (PSD) and Alexandre Giordano of Podemos (PODE) were up for election.

Alexandre Giordano (PODE), who had been elected in 2018 as the first substitute on the ticket headed by Major Olímpio, then a member of the Social Liberal Party, took office on 31 March 2021 following Olímpio's death from complications of COVID-19. Giordano later announced that he would not seek reelection.

On 6 March 2026, Senator Mara Gabrilli, who had been elected in 2018 as a member of the Brazilian Social Democracy Party (PSDB) and left the party in 2023 after 19 years to join the PSD, announced that she would run for the Legislative Assembly of São Paulo in the October 2026 elections, therefore leaving the Federal Senate after serving a single eight-year term.

No.	Senator				Substitute members	Coalition Parties	Ref.
No.	Candidate		Party Federation	Relevant offices	Substitute members	Coalition Parties	Ref.
111		Guilherme Derrite; Guilherme Muraro Derrite	PP; UPB	Member of the Chamber of Deputies for São Paulo (2019–2026); State Secretary of Public Security of São Paulo (2023–2025).	José Vicente Santini (Republicanos) Julio Serson (PP)	Coragem para Seguir Avançando (Republicanos, MDB, PL, PSD, UPB (UNIÃO and PP), Fed. Renovação Solidária (PRD and Solidariedade), Democrata and Avante)	
144	thumbless	Guto Schiavetto Ricardo Augusto Mangue Schiavetto	MISSÃO	No previous office	Medon (MISSÃO) Fabio Rodrigues (MISSÃO)	No coalition	
160		Weller Gonçalves; Weller Pereira da Silva	PSTU	No previous office	Maria Guilherme (PSTU) Bruno Teixeira (PSTU)	No coalition	
161		Dr.ª Eliana; Eliana Lucia Ferreira	PSTU	No previous office	Claudio Donizete (PSTU) Veruska Tenorio (PSTU)	No coalition	
180		Marina Silva; Maria Osmarina Marina da Silva Vaz de Lima	REDE; Fed. PSOL REDE	Member of the City Council of Rio Branco (1989–1991); Member of the Legislative Assembly of Acre (1991–1995); Senator for Acre (1995–2011); Member of the Chamber of Deputies for São Paulo (2023–2026); Minister of the Environment and Climate Change of Brazil (2003–2008; 2023–2026).	Djalma Nery (PSOL) Antônio Neto (PDT)	Desperta São Paulo (FE Brasil (PT, PCdoB and PV), PSB, Fed. PSOL REDE (PSOL and REDE) and PDT)	
200		Geraldo Rufino; Geraldo Aristides Rufino	PODE	No previous office	Ana Estima (PODE) Jason Albuquerque (PODE)	No coalition	
211		Petter Maahs; Petter Maahs da Silva	PCB	No previous office	Olga Soares Gallati (PCB) Vinicius Jardim Carvalho (PCB)	No coalition	
222		André do Prado; André Luis do Prado	PL	Member of the City Council of Guararema (1993–2000); Municipal Secretary of Health of Guararema (2001–2004); Vice Mayor of Guararema (2001–2004); Mayor of Guararema (2005–2008); Member of the Legislative Assembly of São Paulo (2011–2026); President of the Legislative Assembly of São Paulo (2023–2026).	Fernando Fiori (PL) Rute Costa (PL)	Coragem para Seguir Avançando (Republicanos, MDB, PL, PSD, UPB (UNIÃO and PP), Fed. Renovação Solidária (PRD and Solidariedade), Democrata and Avante)	
232		Soninha Francine; Sonia Francine Gaspar Marmo	Cidadania; Fed. PSDB Cidadania	Member of the City Council of São Paulo (2005–2008); Subprefect of Lapa (2009–2010); Municipal Secretary of Social Assistance of São Paulo (2017); Municipal Secretary of Human Rights and Citizenship of São Paulo (2022–2025).	Dr. Fabio Lopes (Cidadania) Shell Gomes (Cidadania)	Fed. PSDB Cidadania (PSDB and Cidadania)	
290	thumbless	Ednelson Cesaretti; Ednelson Cesaretti	PCO	No previous office	Carlos Augusto (PCO) André Amado (PCO)	No coalition	
360	thumbless	William Teixeira; William Teixeira de Oliveira	Agir	No previous office	Toninho Serapião Tubarão (Agir) José Vaz (Agir)	No coalition	
400		Simone Tebet; Simone Nassar Tebet	PSB	Member of the Legislative Assembly of Mato Grosso do Sul (2003–2005); Mayor of Três Lagoas (2005–2010); Vice Governor of Mato Grosso do Sul (2011–2015); State Secretary of Government of Mato Grosso do Sul (2013–2014); Senator for Mato Grosso do Sul (2015–2023); Minister of Planning and Budget of Brazil (2023–2026).	Laio Morais (PT) Marcelo Barbieri (PDT)	Desperta São Paulo (FE Brasil (PT, PCdoB and PV), PSB, Fed. PSOL REDE (PSOL and REDE) and PDT)	
800		Márcio Alves; Márcio Alves dos Santos	UP	No previous office	Manoel Pereira (UP) Allana Matos (UP)	No coalition	
808		Maíra de Souza; Maria Dias de Souza	UP	No previous office	Renato Melo (UP) Penha Daolio (UP)	No coalition	

=== Declined or withdrew ===
==== Declined ====
- Geraldo Alckmin (PSB) – anesthesiologist, incumbent Vice President of Brazil, former Minister of Development, Industry, Trade and Services (2023–2026) and Governor of São Paulo (2001–2006; 2011–2018).

Withdrawn candidates

- Márcio França (PSB) – lawyer, former Minister of Entrepreneurship, Microenterprise and Small Business (2023–2026), former Governor of São Paulo (2018–2019), and former Vice Governor of São Paulo (2015–2018).
- Ricardo Salles (NOVO) – former State Secretary of the Environment of São Paulo (2016–2017), former Minister of Environment (2019–2021), and Member of the Chamber of Deputies for São Paulo (2023–2026).

== Debates ==
Televised debates and interviews are scheduled to take place between 9 August and 29 September 2026 during the first round. Broadcasters chose to invite candidates who were polling well in opinion polls.

=== Gubernatorial candidates ===
2026 São Paulo gubernatorial election debates
No.	Date, time and location	Hosts	Moderators	Participants	
No.	Date, time and location	Hosts	Moderators	PT	Rep
No.	Date, time and location	Hosts	Moderators	Haddad	Freitas
1.1	Sunday, 9 August 2026, 20:00, São Paulo	Band TV, BandNews TV, BandNews FM, Rádio Bandeirantes	Rodolfo Schneider	P	P
1.2	Friday, 18 September 2026	SBT São Paulo, RedeTV!, Redevida, CNN Brasil, SBT News, Novabrasil São Paulo, Veja, Exame, Terra, Metrópoles, Portal PlatôBR	—N/a	Cancelled	
1.3	Monday, 21 September 2026, 13:25	Record São Paulo, O Estado de S. Paulo, R7	Reinaldo Gottino	P	A
1.4	Tuesday, 29 September 2026, 22:30	TV Globo São Paulo, G1	Alan Severiano	P	P
Key: P Present A Absent I Invited

=== Senatorial candidates ===
2026 São Paulo senatorial election debates
No.	Date, time and location	Hosts	Moderators	Participants						
No.	Date, time and location	Hosts	Moderators	PP	Cid	PL	PODE	NOVO	REDE	PSB
No.	Date, time and location	Hosts	Moderators	Derrite	Francine	Prado	Rufino	Salles	Silva	Tebet
1	Wednesday, 9 September 2026, 22:45, São Paulo	Band TV, BandNews TV, Bandplay, YouTube	Marco Antonio Sabino	P	P	P	P	P	P	P
2	Monday, 21 September 2026, 10:00, São Paulo	UOL, Folha de S. Paulo	Fabíola Cidral	P	N	P	N	P	P	P
3	Wednesday, 23 September 2026, 19:00, São Paulo	O Estado de S. Paulo, FAAP	Roseann Kennedy	P	P	P	P	P	P	P
4	Friday, 25 September 2026, 13:00, São Paulo	G1	Ana Paula Campos	A	P	A	P	N	P	P
Key: P Present A Absent I Invited N Not invited

== Opinion polling ==
=== Governor ===
==== First round ====
The first round took place on 4 October 2026.

2026

Pollster firm	Polling period	Tarcísio Republicanos	Haddad PT	Others	Blank Null Undec.	Margin of error	Sample size	Lead	Link
Ideia	5–8 Aug	50.6	33.6	4.5	11.4	±2.3 pp	1,800	17	
Vox Brasil	29–31 Jul	52.9	34.3	3.6	9.2	±2.55 pp	1,480	18.6	
Paraná Pesquisas	25–28 Jul	48.8	35.1	3.7	12.7	±2.4 pp	1,680	13.7	
Quaest	23–27 Jul	41	26	5	28	±2 pp	1,650	15	
Datafolha	1–3 Jul	46	30	13	11	±2 pp	1,608	16	
Vox Brasil	25–27 Jun	51.8	37.5	—N/a	10.5	±2.5 pp	1,480	14.3	

Pollster firm	Polling period	Tarcísio Republicanos	Haddad PT	P. Serra PSDB	Kataguiri MISSÃO	Others	Blank Null Undec.	Margin of error	Sample size	Lead	Link
	21 Jun	Paulo Serra (PSDB) withdraws from the race.									
	20 Jun	Kim Kataguiri (Mission) withdraws from the race.									
Paraná Pesquisas	16–18 Jun	45.6	34.1	4.6	3	—N/a	12.7	±2.5 pp	1,600	11.5	
Real Time Big Data	13–15 Jun	46	33	6	8	—N/a	7	±2 pp	2,000	13	
Real Time Big Data	13–15 Jun	49	33	10	—N/a	—N/a	8	±2 pp	2,000	16	
Vox Brasil	26–28 May	45.8	34.8	6.9	2.8	0.8	8.9	±2.55 pp	1,480	11	
Paraná Pesquisas	18–20 May	47.3	33.5	4.3	3.4	—N/a	11.2	±2.5 pp	1,640	13.8	
Quaest	23–27 Apr	38	26	5	5	—N/a	26	±2 pp	1,650	12	
Quaest	23–27 Apr	40	28	—N/a	5	—N/a	27	±2 pp	1,650	12	
Vox Brasil	22–25 Apr	48.2	32.3	5.1	3.3	2.2	8.9	±2.55 pp	1,480	15.9	
Paraná Pesquisas	11–14 Apr	47.8	33.1	4.6	3.5	—N/a	11.1	±2.5 pp	1,600	14.7	
AtlasIntel	24–27 Mar	49.1	42.6	1.2	5	—N/a	2,1	±2 pp	2,254	6.5	
Real Time Big Data	6–7 Mar	47	31	7	8	—N/a	7	±2 pp	2,000	16	
Datafolha	3–5 Mar	44	31	5	5	3	7	±2 pp	1,608	13	
Paraná Pesquisas	6–10 Feb	51	27.7	4.2	5.2	1.6	10.3	±2.5 pp	1,580	23.3	

=== Senate ===
==== 2026 ====
Pollster firm	Polling period	Derrite PP	Marina REDE	Tebet PSB	França PSB	Boulos PSOL	Salles NOVO	Paulinho SD	Mello Araújo PL	Frias PL	Others	Blank Null Undec.	Margin of error	Sample size	Lead	Link
Genial/Quaest	23–27 Apr	8	—N/a	14	12	—N/a	6	—N/a	—N/a	—N/a	9	51	±2.0 pp	1,650	2	
Genial/Quaest	23–27 Apr	8	12	14	—N/a	—N/a	6	—N/a	—N/a	—N/a	10	50	±2.0 pp	1,650	2	
Genial/Quaest	23–27 Apr	—N/a	—N/a	14	12	—N/a	—N/a	—N/a	—N/a	—N/a	17	57	±2.0 pp	1,650	2	
Genial/Quaest	23–27 Apr	—N/a	—N/a	15	12	—N/a	—N/a	—N/a	—N/a	—N/a	22	51	±2.0 pp	1,650	3	
Vox Brasil	22–25 Apr	27.2	29.7	26.1	—N/a	—N/a	—N/a	—N/a	—N/a	—N/a	22.5	—	±2.55 pp	1,480	2.5	
Paraná Pesquisas	11–14 Apr	13.7	18.9	16.5	—N/a	—N/a	9.6	7.6	—N/a	—N/a	4.9	19.4	±2.5 pp	1,600	2.4	
Paraná Pesquisas	11–14 Apr	13.4	18.9	16.2	—N/a	—N/a	9.1	7.4	—N/a	6.7	—N/a	18.6	±2.5 pp	1,600	2.7	
Paraná Pesquisas	11–14 Apr	13.4	18.7	16.3	—N/a	—N/a	9.2	6.9	9.0	—N/a	—N/a	17.8	±2.5 pp	1,600	2.4	
AtlasIntel	24–27 Mar	22.0	19.6	22.6	—N/a	—N/a	11.1	0.5	14.8	—N/a	—	9.5	±2.0 pp	2,254	0.6	
AtlasIntel	24–27 Mar	22.1	19.7	—N/a	—N/a	—N/a	12.8	0.6	—N/a	12.3	21.8	10.7	±2.0 pp	2,254	2.4	
Gerp	16–20 Mar	21	12	22	6	—N/a	—N/a	3	—N/a	4	1	32	±3.16 pp	1,000	1	
Real Time Big Data	6–7 Mar	15	15	16	—N/a	—N/a	12	6	11	—N/a	—	25	±2.0 pp	2,000	1	
Real Time Big Data	6–7 Mar	16	17	20	—N/a	—N/a	—N/a	8	—N/a	—N/a	14	25	±2.0 pp	2,000	3	
Real Time Big Data	6–7 Mar	16	15	—N/a	—N/a	—N/a	13	7	—N/a	11	21	17	±2.0 pp	2,000	5	
Datafolha	3–5 Mar	14	18	25	20	14	13	10	—N/a	—N/a	40	18	±2.0 pp	1,608	5	
Datafolha	3–5 Mar	13	21	25	20	15	13	9	—N/a	—N/a	40	24	±2.0 pp	1,608	4	
100% Cidades/Futura	20–23 Jan	19.9	30.0	—N/a	—N/a	—N/a	14.1	10.4	—N/a	—N/a	45.3	64.8	±2.8 pp	1,200	3.2	
100% Cidades/Futura	20–23 Jan	21.0	30.3	—N/a	—N/a	—N/a	15.3	—N/a	—N/a	—N/a	50.8	—	±2.8 pp	1,200	8.9	

Pollster firm	Polling period	Derrite PP	Marina REDE	Tebet PSB	França PSB	Boulos PSOL	Salles NOVO	Paulinho SD	Mello Araújo PL	Frias PL	Others	Blank Null Undec.	Margin of error	Sample size	Lead	Link
Paraná Pesquisas	11–14 Apr	13.7	18.9	16.5	—N/a	—N/a	9.6	7.6	—N/a	—N/a	4.9	19.4	±2.5 pp	1,600	2.4	
Paraná Pesquisas	11–14 Apr	13.4	18.9	16.2	—N/a	—N/a	9.1	7.4	—N/a	6.7	—N/a	18.6	±2.5 pp	1,600	2.7	
Paraná Pesquisas	11–14 Apr	13.4	18.7	16.3	—N/a	—N/a	9.2	6.9	9.0	—N/a	—N/a	17.8	±2.5 pp	1,600	2.4	

== Results ==
=== Governor ===
Candidate	Running mate	Party	Votes	%
Tarcísio de Freitas (incumbent)	Felicio Ramuth (MDB)	Republicanos	14,491,874	62.65
Fernando Haddad	Márcio França (PSB)	Workers' Party	8,423,656	36.42
Vivian Mendes	Cris Damasio	Popular Unity	80,480	0.35
Vera Lúcia Salgado	Fabio Bosco	United Socialist Workers' Party	75,641	0.33
Carlos Machado	Felipe Queiroz	Brazilian Communist Party	58,862	0.25
Total			23,130,513	100.00
Valid votes			23,130,513	87.63
Invalid votes			1,915,481	7.26
Blank votes			1,348,262	5.11
Total votes			26,394,256	100.00
Registered voters/turnout			34,081,699	77.44
Republicanos hold				

Popular vote
Tarcísio	62.65%
Haddad	36.42%
Others	0.93%

=== Senator ===
Candidate	Party	Votes	%
Guilherme Derrite	PP	13,273,880	30.60
André do Prado	PL	12,703,089	29.28
Simone Tebet	PSB	8,342,968	19.23
Marina Silva	REDE	7,862,400	18.13
Guto Schiavetto	MISSÃO	392,916	0.91
Geraldo Rufino	PODE	386,468	0.89
Soninha Francine	Cidadania	165,707	0.38
Maíra de Souza	UP	91,283	0.21
Eliana Ferreira	PSTU	65,200	0.15
Márcio Alves	UP	45,178	0.10
Peter Maahs	PCB	28,311	0.07
Weller Gonçalves	PSTU	20,503	0.05
William Teixeira	AGIR	8,732	
Total		43,377,903	100.00
Valid votes		43,377,903	82.17
Invalid votes		5,118,690	9.70
Blank votes		4,291,919	8.13
Total votes		52,788,512	100.00
Registered voters/turnout		34,081,699	77.44
PP gain from PODE			
PL gain from PSD			

Popular vote
Derrite	30.60%
Prado	29.28%
Tebet	19.23%
Silva	18.13%
Others	4.56%

=== Chamber of Deputies ===
Party or alliance		Votes	%	Seats	+/–
Liberal Party		6,429,497	27.16	19	▲2
PSOL REDE	Socialism and Liberty Party	3,002,094	12.68	6	▲1
PSOL REDE	Sustainability Network	58,657	0.25	0	▼1
Brazil of Hope	Workers' Party	2,732,851	11.54	11	▲1
Brazil of Hope	Communist Party of Brazil	84,860	0.36	0	Steady
Brazil of Hope	Green Party	25,831	0.11	0	Steady
Podemos		1,913,048	8.08	6	▲3
Social Democratic Party		1,570,843	6.64	6	▲3
Republicanos		1,501,603	6.34	6	▲1
Brazilian Democratic Movement		1,187,729	5.02	4	▼1
Progressive Union	Progressistas	1,082,494	4.57	3	▼1
Progressive Union	Brazil Union	727,517	3.07	2	▼4
Brazilian Socialist Party		964,284	4.07	2	Steady
Mission Party		656,391	2.77	1	New
New Party		596,496	2.52	2	▲1
PSDB Cidadania	Brazilian Social Democracy Party	250,766	1.06	1	▼2
PSDB Cidadania	Cidadania	128,539	0.54	0	▼2
Solidary Renewal	Democratic Renewal Party	201,180	0.85	1	▲1
Solidary Renewal	Solidariedade	159,357	0.67	0	▼1
Avante		195,498	0.83	0	Steady
Democratic Labour Party		148,300	0.63	0	Steady
Christian Democracy		27,408	0.12	0	Steady
Popular Unity		13,476	0.06	0	Steady
United Socialist Workers' Party		8,012	0.03	0	Steady
Democrata		4,123	0.02	0	Steady
Agir		3,334	0.01	0	Steady
Total		23,674,188	100.00	70	–
Valid votes		23,674,188	89.69		
Invalid votes		1,158,490	4.39		
Blank votes		1,561,578	5.92		
Total votes		26,394,256	100.00		
Registered voters/turnout		34,081,699	77.44		

=== Legislative Assembly ===
Party or alliance		Votes	%	Seats	+/–
Liberal Party		6,286,047	26.99	27	▲8
Brazil of Hope	Workers' Party	3,483,191	14.96	16	▼2
Brazil of Hope	Communist Party of Brazil	144,358	0.62	0	▼1
Brazil of Hope	Green Party	29,012	0.12	0	Steady
Social Democratic Party		2,251,841	9.67	9	▲5
PSOL REDE	Socialism and Liberty Party	2,089,288	8.97	9	▲4
PSOL REDE	Sustainability Network	171,218	0.74	0	▼1
Republicanos		1,590,829	6.83	6	▼2
Podemos		1,379,162	5.92	6	▲2
Brazilian Democratic Movement		1,194,417	5.13	5	▲1
Progressive Union	Progressistas	1,100,340	4.72	5	▲2
Progressive Union	Brazil Union	1,005,309	4.32	4	▼4
Brazilian Socialist Party		741,565	3.18	3	Steady
Mission Party		429,170	1.84	1	New
New Party		346,706	1.49	1	Steady
PSDB Cidadania	Brazilian Social Democracy Party	342,253	1.47	1	▼8
PSDB Cidadania	Cidadania	125,094	0.54	0	▼2
Solidary Renewal	Democratic Renewal Party	169,176	0.73	1	▲1
Solidary Renewal	Solidarity	96,050	0.41	0	▼1
Democratic Labour Party		159,989	0.69	0	Steady
Avante		59,751	0.26	0	Steady
Christian Democracy		35,017	0.15	0	Steady
National Mobilization		22,310	0.10	0	Steady
Popular Unity		17,736	0.08	0	Steady
United Socialist Workers' Party		9,988	0.04	0	Steady
Agir		5,523	0.02	0	Steady
Democrata		4,674	0.02	0	Steady
Workers' Cause Party		0	0.00	0	Steady
Total		23,290,014	100.00	94	–
Valid votes		23,290,014	88.24		
Invalid votes		1,257,033	4.76		
Blank votes		1,847,209	7.00		
Total votes		26,394,256	100.00		
Registered voters/turnout		34,081,699	77.44		
