= André do Prado =

Brazilian politician (born 1969)

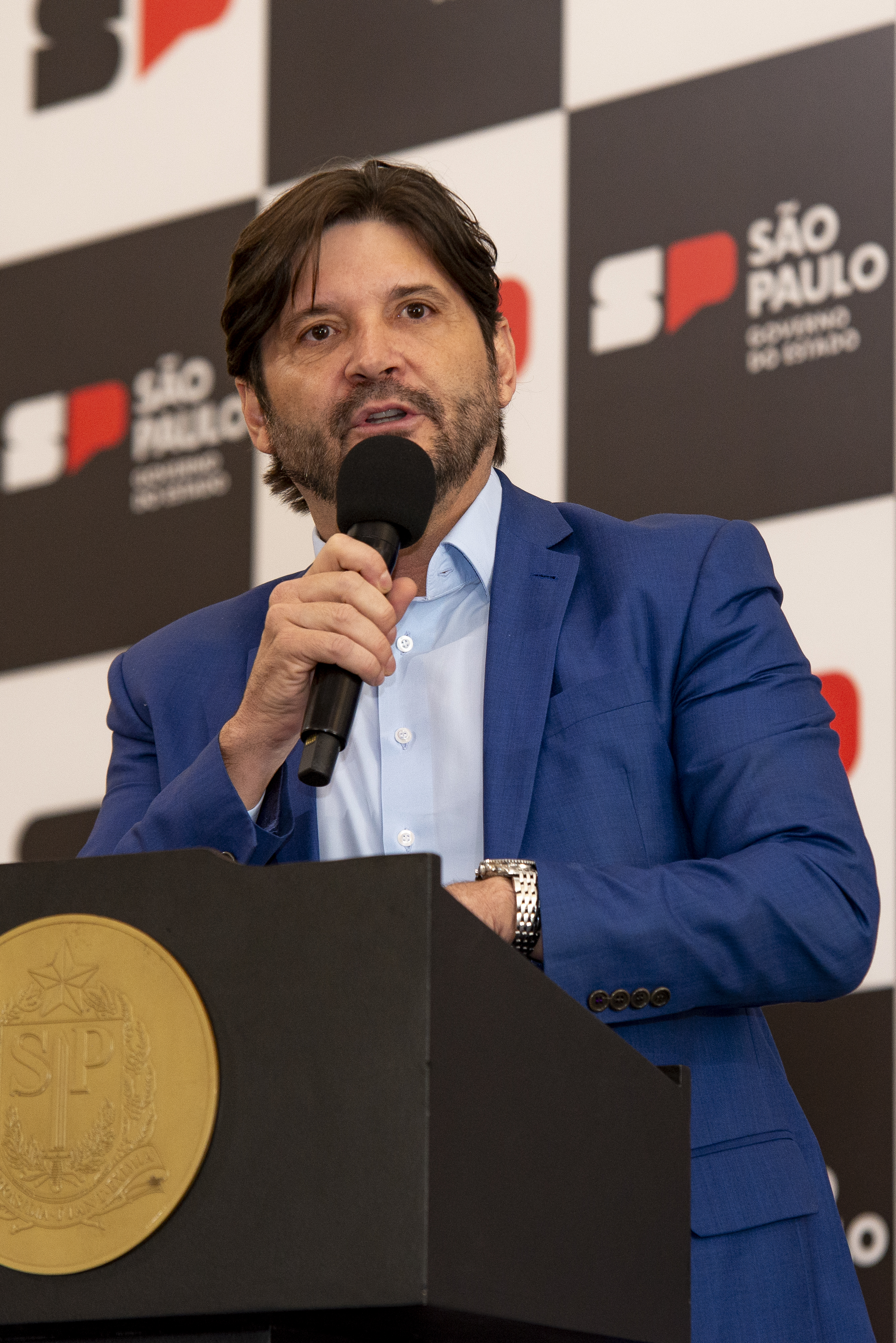

Senator-elect for São Paulo
- Assuming office 1 February 2027

President of the Legislative Assembly of São Paulo
- Incumbent
- Assumed office 15 March 2023
- Preceded by: Carlos Pignatari

State Deputy of São Paulo
- Incumbent
- Assumed office 15 March 2011
- Constituency: At-large

Mayor of Guararema
- In office 1 January 2005 – 1 January 2009
- Vice Mayor: Djalma de Faria
- Preceded by: Conceição de Souza
- Succeeded by: Márcio Alvino

Personal details
- Born: André Luis do Prado; 7 June 1969 (age 57) Guararema, São Paulo, Brazil
- Party: PL (since 2006)
- Other political affiliations: PL (1992–2006)
- Education: Mogi das Cruzes University (BSIT)
- Profession: Systems analyst
- Website: andredoprado.com.br

André Luis do Prado (born 7 June 1969) is a Brazilian politician and systems analyst, member of the Liberal Party (PL). He had previously served as city councillor, vice mayor and mayor of Guararema. In 2010, he was elected member of the Legislative Assembly of São Paulo, reelected in 2014, 2018 and 2022. He is the incumbent president of the Legislative Assembly.

== Biography ==
Prado began his political career in 1992, invited by his friend, Sebastião Alvino de Souza, former mayor of Guararema, to run for the Municipal Chamber. He was elected with 241 votes for the legislature 1993–1997 and reelected with 269 votes for the following legislature (1997–2001), also serving as President of the Chamber.

In 2000, he accepted an invitation to run for Vice Mayor along with mayor Conceição Alvino de Souza, obtaining 7,019 votes. He also had served as municipal Health Secretary. In 2004, Prado was elected mayor of Guararema with 7,536 votes.

In 2010, André do Prado was elected for the state Legislative Assembly, being reelected in 2014, 2018 and 2022.

=== Electoral history ===
Year	Election	Party	Office	Coalition	Partners	Party	Votes	Percent	Result
2004	Municipal Election of Guararema	PL	Mayor	Guararema Even Better (PL, PP, PDT, PTB, PSC, PAN, PTC)	Djalma de Faria	PL	7,536	55.71%	Elected
2010	State Elections of São Paulo	PL	State Deputy	We Are More São Paulo (PRB, PT, PR, PTdoB)	—N/a		86,346	0.41%	Elected
2014	State Elections of São Paulo	PL	State Deputy	—N/a			164,589	0.79%	Elected
2018	State Elections of São Paulo	PL	State Deputy	—N/a			123,313	0.59%	Elected
2022	State Elections of São Paulo	PL	State Deputy	—N/a			216,268	0.93%	Elected
2026	State Elections of São Paulo	PL	Senator	Courage to Keep Advancing (Republicanos, MDB, PL, PSD, UNIÃO, PP, PRD, Solidariedade, Democrata, Avante)	Fernando Fiori	PL	12,703,089	29.28%	Elected
2026	State Elections of São Paulo	PL	Senator	Courage to Keep Advancing (Republicanos, MDB, PL, PSD, UNIÃO, PP, PRD, Solidariedade, Democrata, Avante)	Rute Costa	PL	12,703,089	29.28%	Elected

Political offices
Preceded by Conceição de Souza	Mayor of Guararema; 2005–2009	Succeeded by Márcio Alvino
Preceded by Carlos Pignatari	President of the Legislative Assembly of São Paulo; 2023–present	Incumbent
Lines of succession
Preceded by Felicio Ramuth as Vice Governor of São Paulo	São Paulo Gubernatorial line of succession 2nd in line as President of the Legislative Assembly of São Paulo	Followed by Francisco Loureiro as President of the Court of Justice
