= Dimas Mecca Sampaio =

Major Mecca
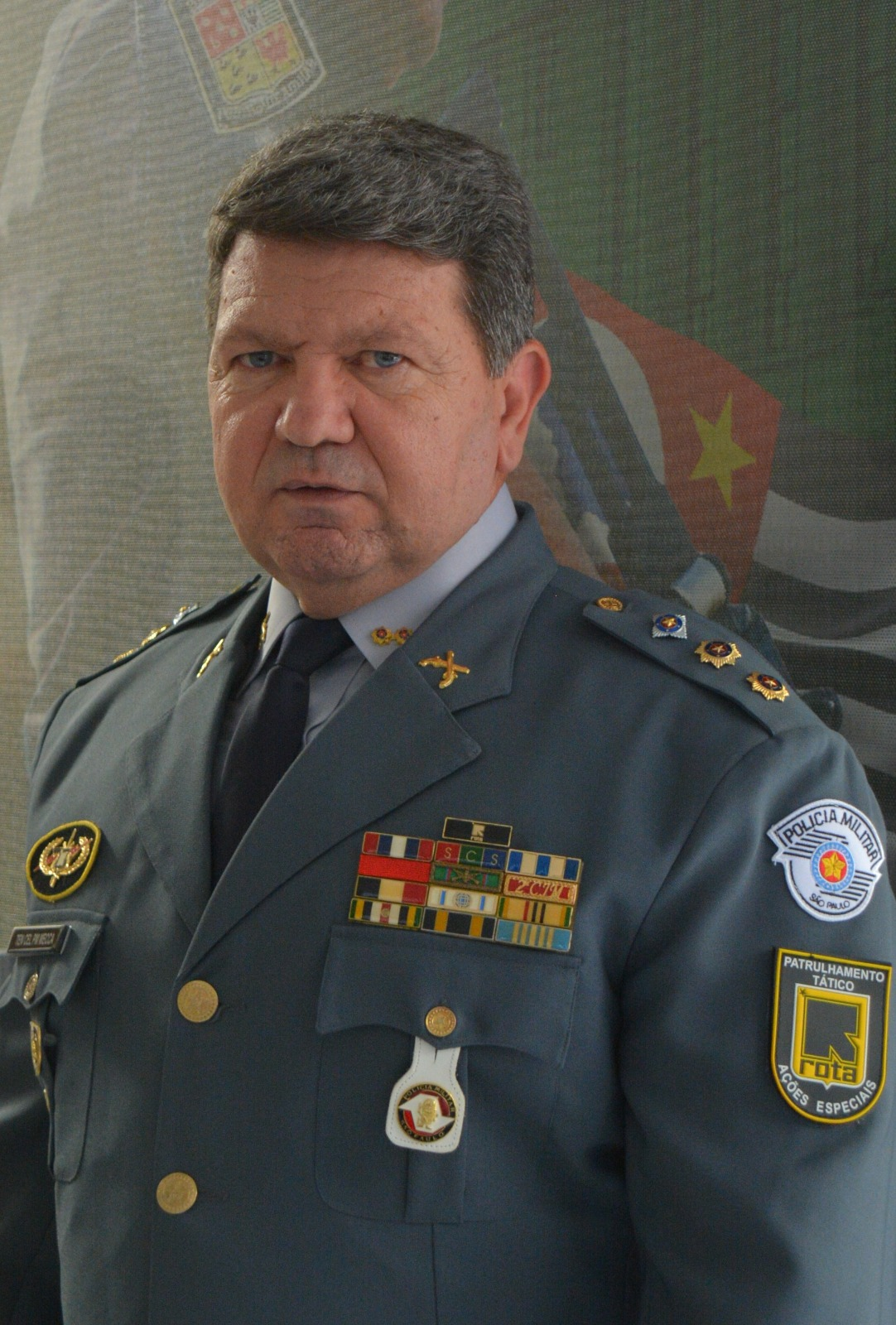
- Major Mecca (2023)

State Deputy of São Paulo
- Incumbent
- Assumed office 2019
- Constituency: Legislative Assembly of São Paulo

Personal details
- Born: Dimas Mecca Sampaio; 22 May 1968 (age 58) Osasco, Brazil
- Party: Partido Liberal
- Other political affiliations
- Profession: Police officer

Dimas Mecca Sampaio (born 22 May 1968 in Osasco), better known as Major Mecca, is a Brazilian military police officer and politician.

He is currently a state deputy in the state of São Paulo for the Liberal Party (PL), having been elected in the 2018 elections with 131,531 votes.

In the 2022 elections, he was re-elected with 224,462 votes, the fifth highest poll. He is married and the father of three children.
