= Alvino =

Alvino is both a given name and a surname.

Notable people with the given name include:

- Alvino Rey (1908–2004), American jazz guitarist and bandleader
- Alvino Volpi Neto (born 1992), Brazilian goalkeeper

Notable people with the surname include:

- Enrico Alvino (1809–1872), Italian architect and urban designer
- Marcio Alvino (born 1969), Brazilian politician
- Vladimir Alvino Guerrero (born 1975), Dominican baseball player
