= Milton Leite Filho =

Brazilian politician (born 1978)

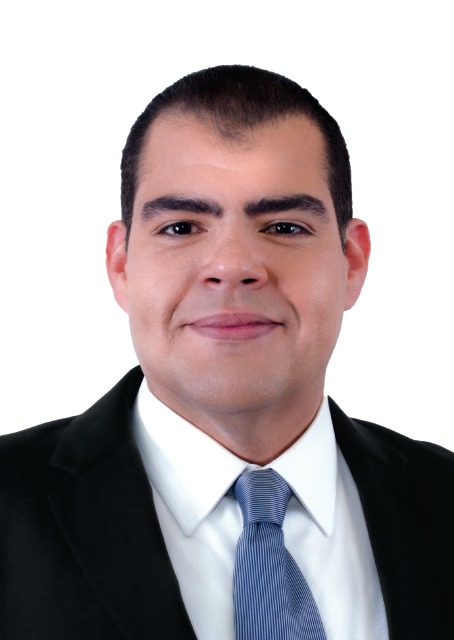

Member of the Legislative Assembly of São Paulo
- Incumbent
- Assumed office 15 March 2007

Personal details
- Born: 3 August 1978 (age 48)
- Party: Brazil Union (since 2022)
- Relatives: Alexandre Leite (brother)

Milton Leite da Silva Filho (born 3 August 1978) is a Brazilian politician serving as a member of the Legislative Assembly of São Paulo since 2007. He is the brother of Alexandre Leite.
