= Cauê Macris =

Brazilian politician (born 1983)

Cauê Caseiro Macris
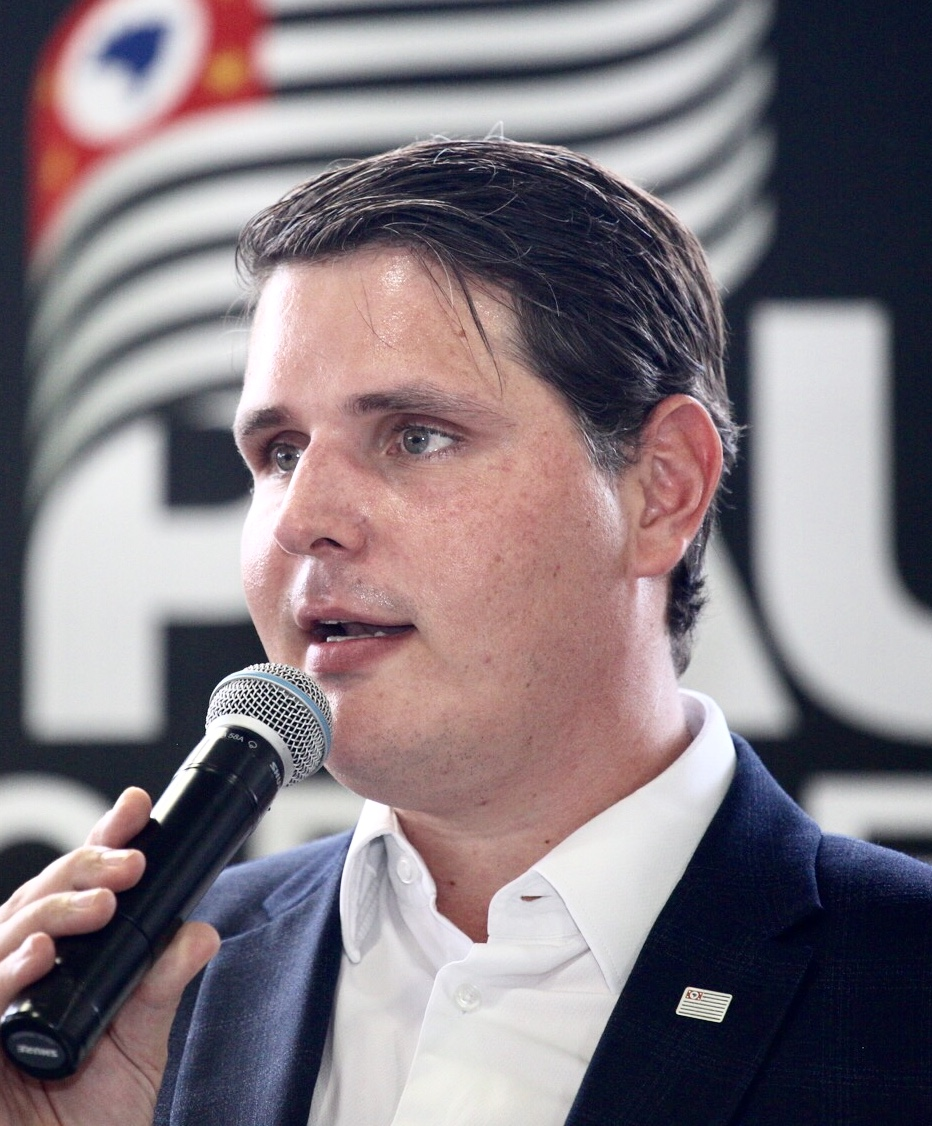
- Macris as Acting Governor in 2019.

President of the Legislative Assembly of the State of São Paulo
- In office 15 March 2017 – 12 March 2021
- Preceded by: Fernando Capez
- Succeeded by: Carlos Pignatari

State Deputy of São Paulo
- Incumbent
- Assumed office 15 March 2011

City Councillor of Americana
- In office 1 January 2005 – 15 March 2011

Personal details
- Born: Cauê Macris; 8 April 1983 (age 43) Americana, São Paulo, Brazil
- Party: PSDB (1999–present)
- Parent: Vanderlei Macris (father)
- Profession: Politician

Cauê Caseiro Macris (born 8 April 1983) is a Brazilian politician, member of the Brazilian Social Democracy Party (PSDB). He is a State Deputy of the state of São Paulo and former President of the Legislative Assembly.

== Career ==
Macris began his political career at 21 as the 8th most voted City Councillor in his hometown. Re-elect for a second term, he was chosen as President of the Municipal Chamber for the biennium 2009/2010. As City Councillor, he was the creator of the first law in Brazil to ban the use of tobacco in common places.

In 2010, he was elect State Deputy for the 17th Legislature (2011-2015) with more than 66,000 votes and present a law project, improved by the then Governor Geraldo Alckmin, which punishes with a fine or closing the establishments which sell alcoholic beverages to children and teenagers. Pioneer in the country, the law is valid in the entire state of São Paulo.

Yet in 2014, he was the youngest PSDB caucus leader in the Assembly. In the following year, after a re-election to the legislative with more than 120,000 votes, he was invited to be Government Leader in the Legislative Assembly by Geraldo Alckmin.

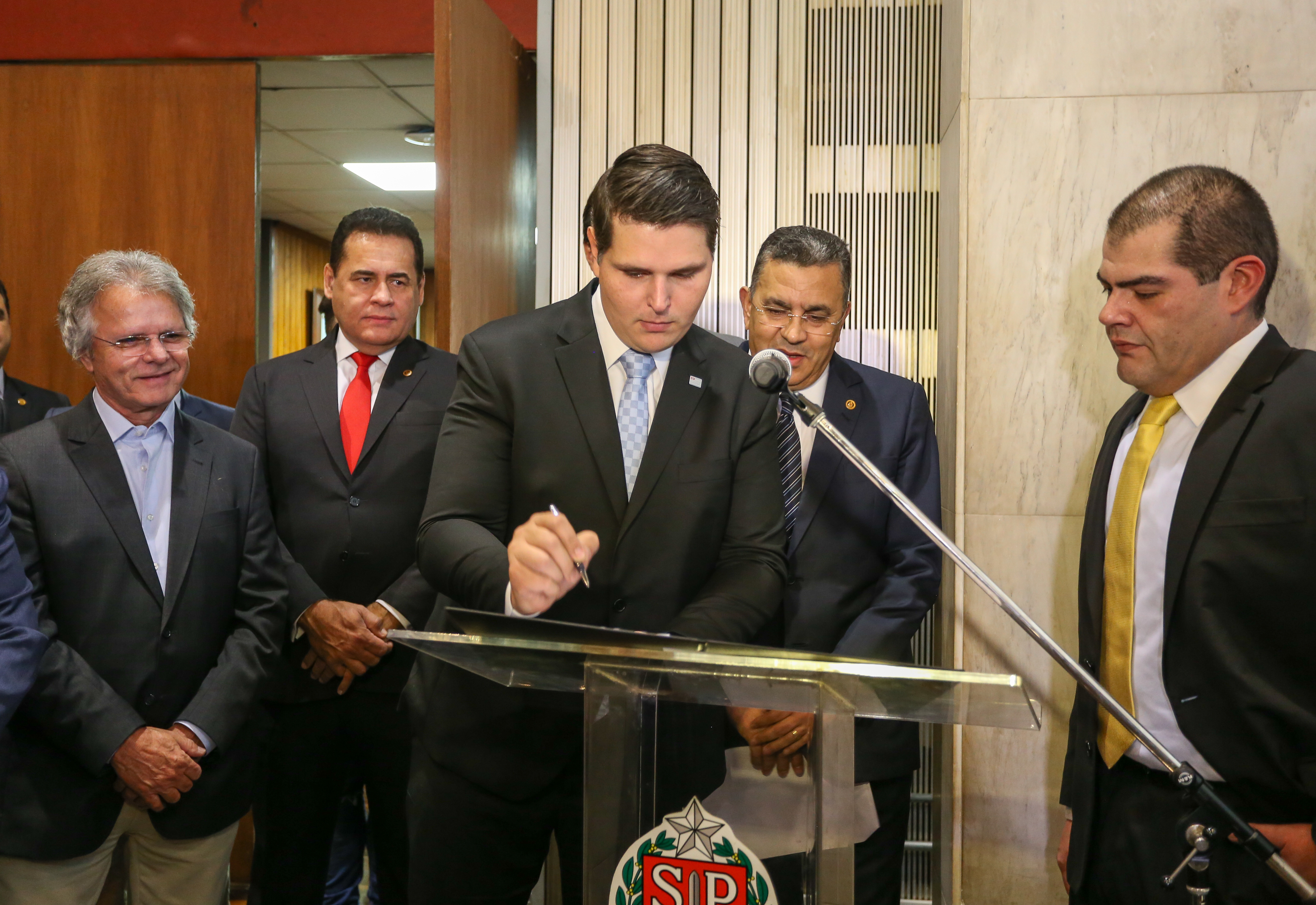
Oath as Acting Governor.

At 33-years-old, he ascended to the office of President of the Legislative Assembly, elect for the biennium 2017/2019, with 88 of the 94 votes of the House.

In an article published by Folha de S. Paulo, on 6 June 2017, Macris defended the leaving of the PSDB from the Michel Temer administration.

On 15 March 2019, he was re-elect President of the Assembly, receiving 70 votes against 16 of his main opponent, Janaína Paschoal (PSL).

In September 2019, he assumed as Acting Governor of São Paulo for 5 days due to the absence of the Governor and his Vice.

Political offices
Preceded by Fernando Capez	President of the Legislative Assembly of São Paulo; 2019−21	Succeeded by Carlos Pignatari
