= Alexandre Leite =

Brazilian politician (born 1989)

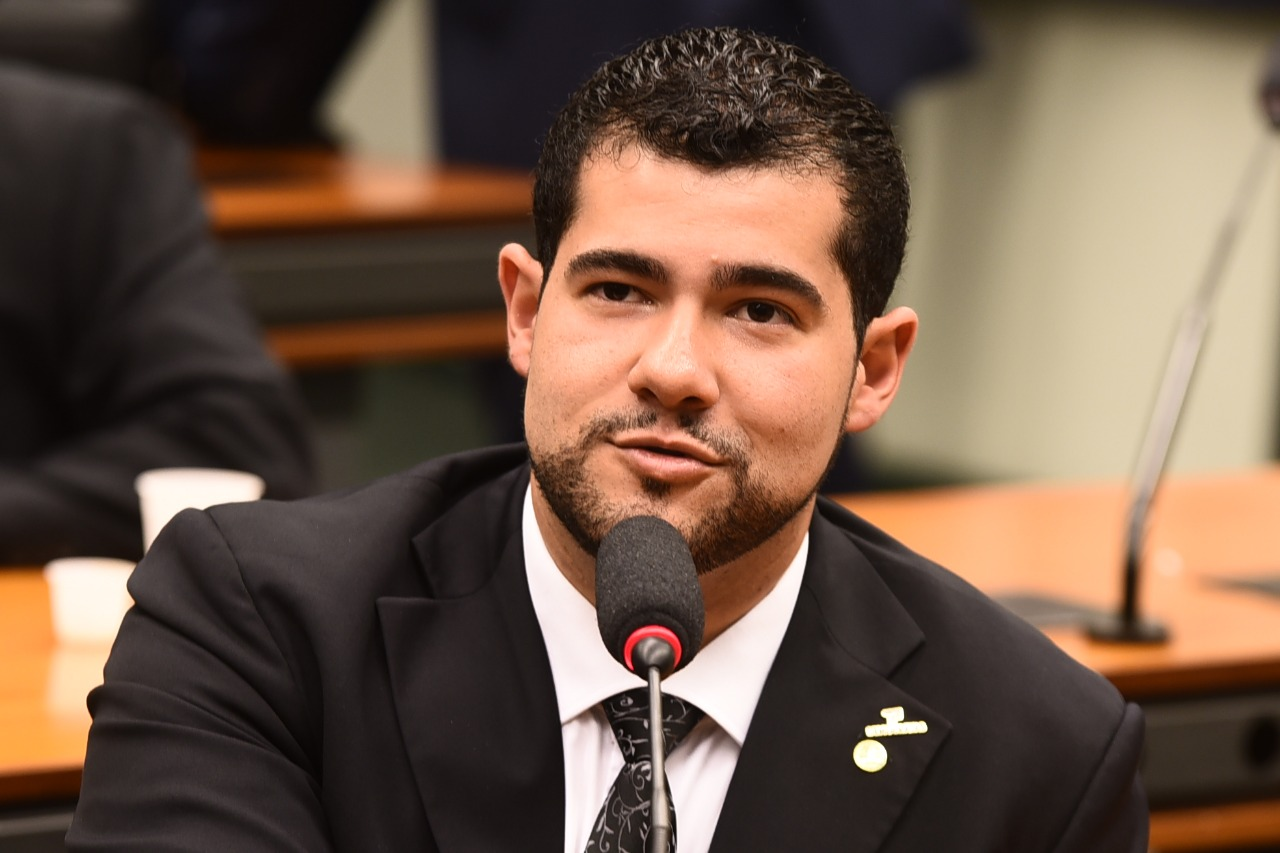
- Leite in 2019

Member of the Chamber of Deputies
- Incumbent
- Assumed office 1 February 2011
- Constituency: São Paulo

Personal details
- Born: 18 April 1989 (age 36)
- Party: Brazil Union (since 2022)
- Relatives: Milton Leite Filho (brother)

Alexandre Leite da Silva (born 18 April 1989) is a Brazilian politician serving as a member of the Chamber of Deputies since 2011. He has served as secretary of institutional relations of São Paulo since 2025.
