= Carlos Pignatari =

Brazilian entrepreneur and politician

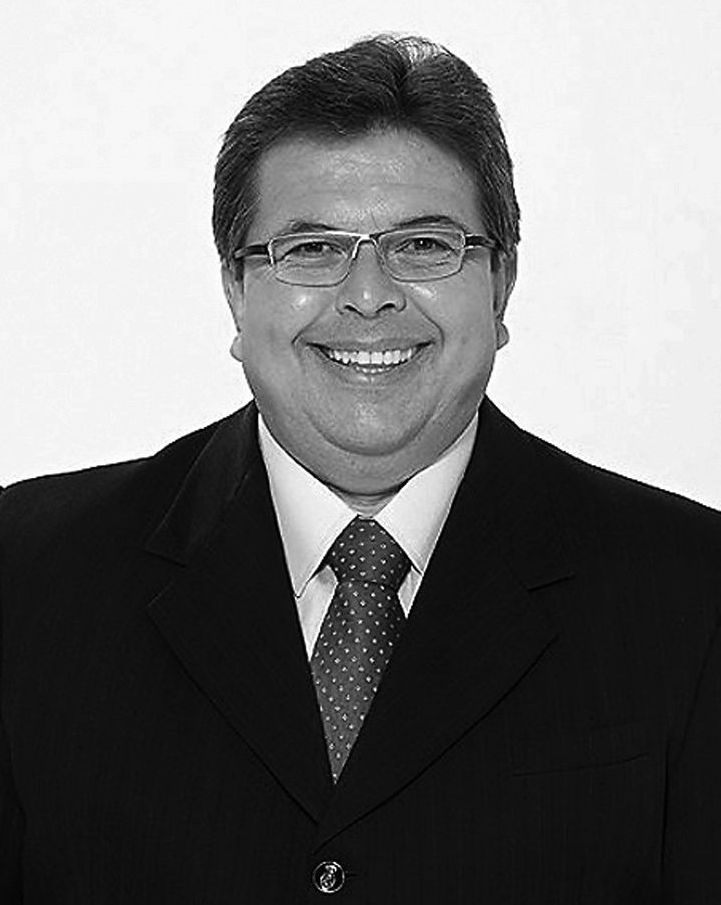

President of the Legislative Assembly of São Paulo
- In office 15 March 2021 – 15 March 2023
- Preceded by: Cauê Macris
- Succeeded by: André do Prado

Member of the Legislative Assembly of São Paulo
- Incumbent
- Assumed office 15 March 2011
- Constituency: At-large

Mayor of Votuporanga
- In office 1 January 2001 – 1 January 2009
- Vice Mayor: Pedro Stefanelli Filho
- Preceded by: Atílio Pozzobon Neto
- Succeeded by: Nasser Marão Filho

Personal details
- Born: Carlos Eduardo Pignatari; 9 April 1959 (age 67) Votuporanga, São Paulo, Brazil
- Party: PSDB (1992–2026); PSD (2026–present)
- Spouse: Marli Beneduzzi
- Children: 4
- Website: www.carlaopignatari.com.br

Carlos Eduardo Pignatari (born 9 April 1959 in Votuporanga), mostly known as Carlão Pignatari, is a Brazilian entrepreneur and politician, member of the Social Democratic Party (PSD).

He was Mayor of Votuporanga for two terms and, in the 2018 state elections, Pignatari was elect state deputy of the state of São Paulo for the third time.

== Biography ==
Born in the municipality of Votuporanga, Carlos Pignatari is married to Marli Beneduzzi, with whom they have four children and one grandson. He began his political career at the age of 33, when he joined PSDB in 1992. Pignatari was regional coordinator of Mário Covas campaign for Governor in 1994.

== Electoral history ==
Year	Election	Coalition	Party	Office	Statewide votes	Votes in Votuporanga	Result
2000	Municipal of Votuporanga	PDT, PMDB, PSC, PL, PPS, PFL, PSDC, PGT, PSB, PSD, PSDB, PCdoB	PSDB	Mayor	–	21,801 (1st)	Elect
2004	Municipal of Votuporanga	PDT, PTB, PMDB, PSC, PL, PFL, PSDC, PSB, PV, PSDB	PSDB	Mayor	–	34,856 (1st)	Elect
2010	São Paulo Statewide	DEM, PSDB	PSDB	State Deputy	70,337 (79th)	34,953 (1st)	Elect
2014	São Paulo Statewide	PSDB, DEM, PPS, PRB	PSDB	State Deputy	97,444 (44th)	29,269 (1st)	Elect
2018	São Paulo Statewide	PSDB, PSD, DEM, PP, PRB	PSDB	State Deputy	74,006 (56th)	23,555 (1st)	Elect
2022	São Paulo Statewide	—N/a	PSDB	State Deputy	105,245 (42nd)	18,646 (1st)	Elect

Political offices
Preceded by Atílio Pozzobon Neto	Mayor of Votuporanga; 2001–2009	Succeeded by Nasser Marão Filho
Preceded by Cauê Macris	President of the Legislative Assembly of São Paulo; 2021–2023	Succeeded by André do Prado
