= Leonardo Siqueira =

Brazilian politician

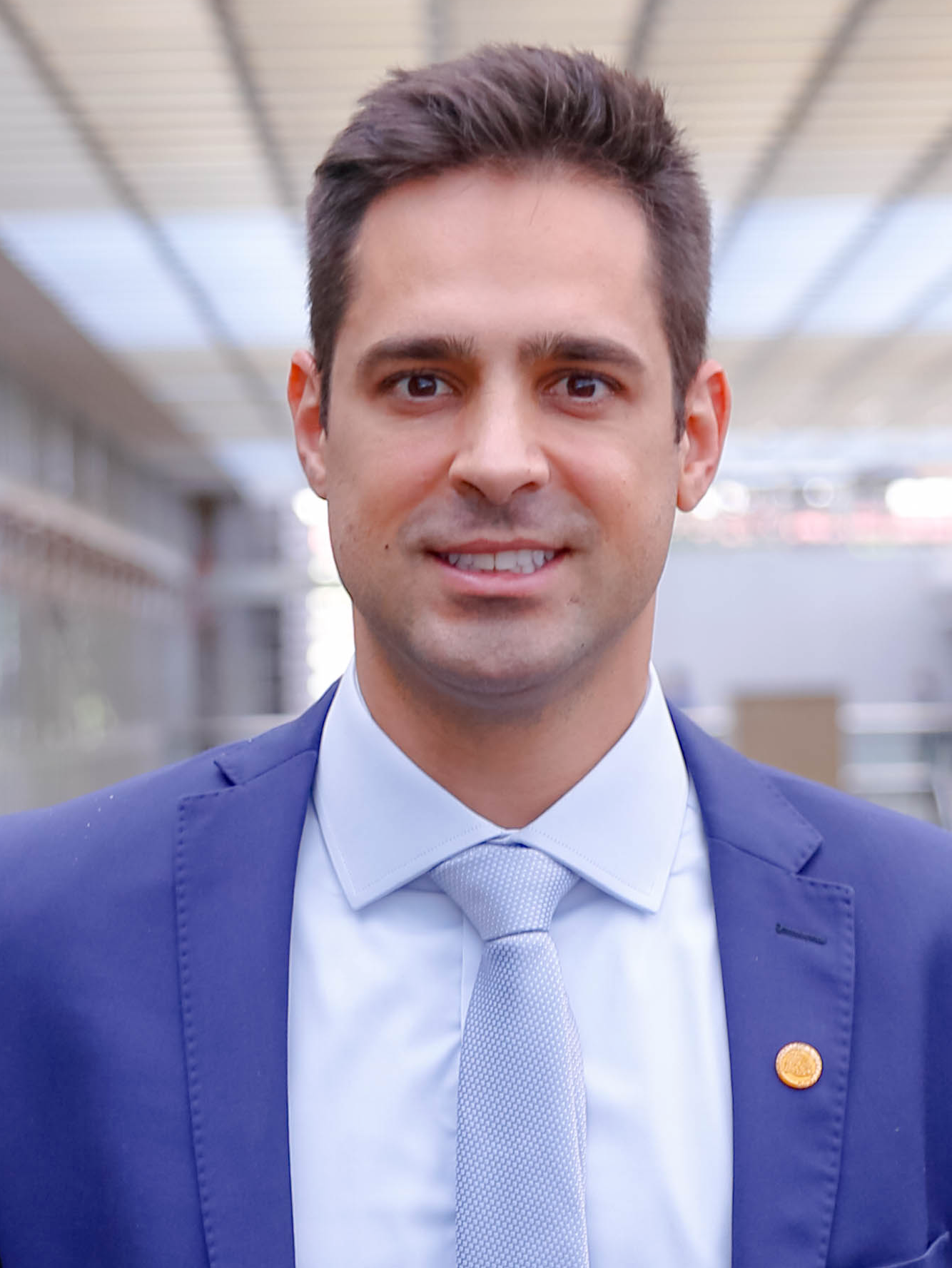
- Leonardo Siqueira

State Deputy of São Paulo
- Incumbent
- Assumed office 15 March 2019
- Constituency: State of São Paulo

Personal details
- Born: 23 January 1986 (age 40) São Paulo, Brazil
- Party: Novo (since 2022)
- Other political affiliations
- Profession: Economist

Leonardo de Siqueira Lima (São Paulo, January 23, 1986) is a Brazilian economist and politician. He holds a degree in Economics from Fundação Getulio Vargas, a master's degree from the Barcelona School of Economics (BSE), and a PhD in Economics from Insper. In 2022, he was elected state deputy for São Paulo by the Novo with 90,688 votes. Leo Siqueira has professional experience at Suno Research, BTG Pactual, and Itaú BBA. He is also the founder of the website Terraço Econômico, a fellow of the Young Leaders of the Americas Initiative (YLAI) program, and the founder of the NGO Mais Educação. In his political work, he focuses on improving basic education, combating political and bureaucratic privileges, and facilitating the lives of entrepreneurs who generate employment.

== Elections ==
Year	Election	Party	Candidate for	Votes	Result
2022	State of São Paulo	NOVO	State Deputy	90,688 (0.39%)	Elected
