= Delegado Olim =

Brazilian politician

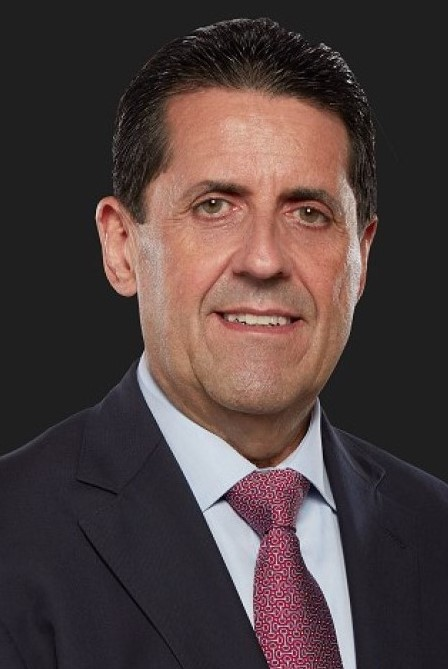
- Delegado Olim

State Deputy of São Paulo
- Incumbent
- Assumed office 5 October 2014
- Constituency: State of São Paulo

Personal details
- Born: 11 September 1958 (age 68) São Paulo, Brazil
- Party: Progressistas
- Other political affiliations
- Profession: Police man and Advocate

Antonio Assunção de Olim (born September 11, 1958, in São Paulo), better known as Delegado Olim, is a Brazilian lawyer, police officer of the São Paulo Civil Police, and politician, affiliated with the Progressistas (PP) party.

== Biography ==
He graduated in law from FMU University, he worked in various sectors of the civil police.

Delegado Olim ran for a seat the Legislative Assembly of the State of São Paulo in 2014, being elected in the election held on October 5, receiving 195,932 votes, the 5th most voted candidate.

In the 2018 elections, he was re-elected state deputy with 161,569 votes.

In 2022, he was elected for a third term in the ALESP (Legislative Assembly of the State of São Paulo), with 201,348 votes.
