= Vitor Sapienza =

Brazilian politician and physician (1933–2020)

Member of the Legislative Assembly of São Paulo
- In office 1987–2019

President of the Legislative Assembly of São Paulo
- In office 1993–1995

Personal details
- Born: December 16, 1933 São Paulo, São Paulo, Brazil
- Died: April 9, 2020 (aged 86) São Paulo, São Paulo, Brazil
- Party: Cidadania (PPS)
- Other political affiliations: PMDB (former)
- Education: Pontifical Catholic University of São Paulo
- Profession: Politician, economist

Vitor Sapienza (December 16, 1933 – April 9, 2020) was a Brazilian politician and economist from the state of São Paulo.

== Life ==
Sapienza had a degree in economics and countable sciences from the Pontifical Catholic University of São Paulo.

In 1962, he started working as an accountant for the State of São Paulo. During this period of time, he had an active role at the State of São Paulo accountant union, and held various posts such as president, Secretary and Council member.

In 1986, Sapienza successfully ran for a spot at the Legislative Assembly of São Paulo. His first term started in 1987 and finished in 1991.

After his first tenure as a State Deputy, Sapienza was re-elected five consecutive times, in the years of 1990, 1994, 1998, 2002 and 2006.

In 1993, he was elected by his peers as President of the Legislative Assembly of São Paulo and kept the position from 1993 to 1995.

In 1994, for a brief period of time, Sapienza was nominated Acting governor of the State of São Paulo.

At the elections of 2010 and 2014, he didn't get enough votes for re-election, but was nominated for State Deputy on both occasions due to vacancies in his political coalition.

Altogether, Sapienza held a total of eight tenures as a State Deputy.

== Death ==
On April 9, 2020, Sapienza died at Hospital Sírio-Libanês in São Paulo, at the age of 86 due to complications brought on by COVID-19.
