= Vanderlei Macris =

Brazilian politician (born 1950)

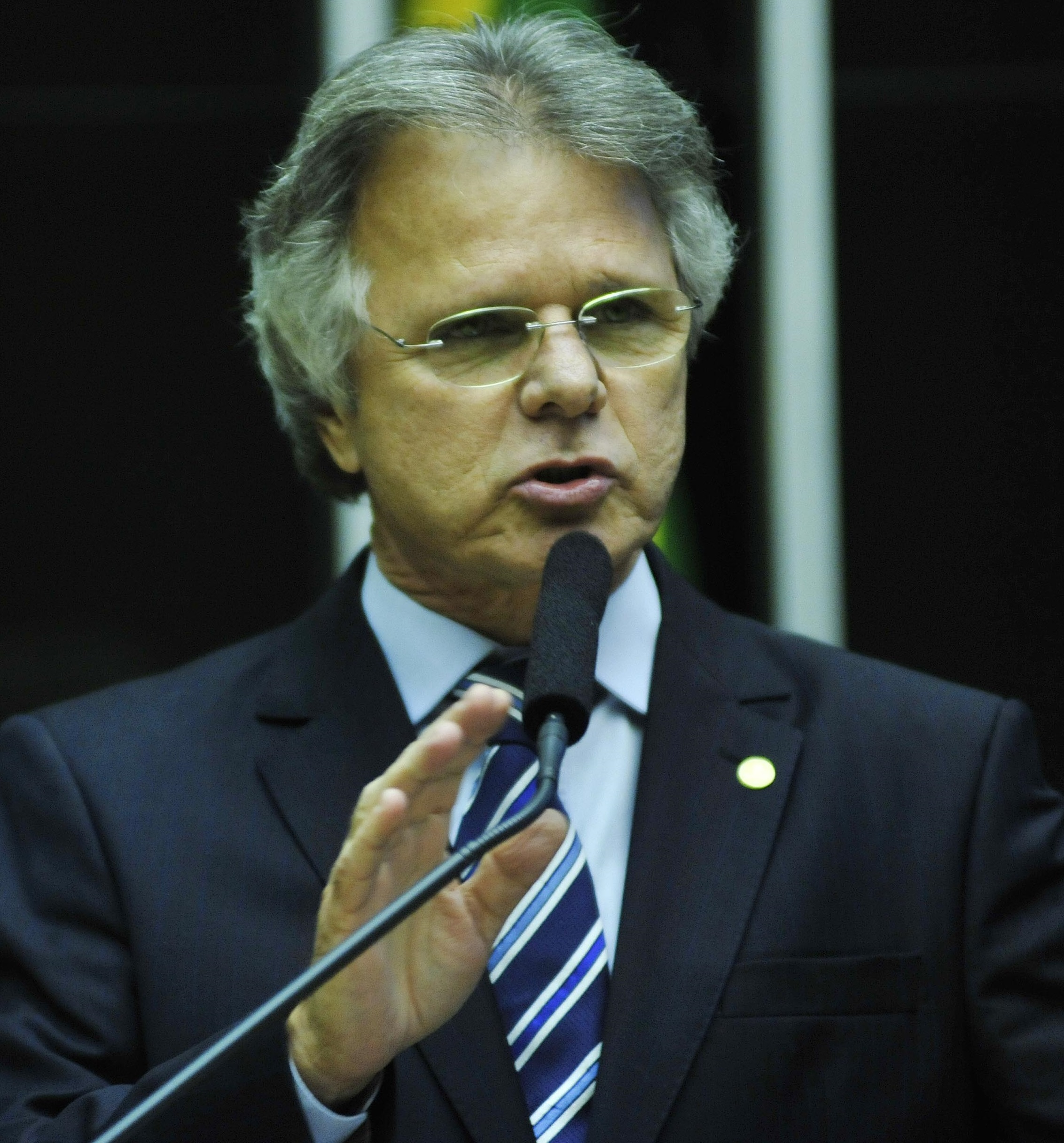
- Macris in February 2015

Member of the Chamber of Deputies for São Paulo
- Incumbent
- Assumed office 12 August 2012
- In office 1 February 2007 – 31 January 2011

Member of the Legislative Assembly of the State of São Paulo
- In office 15 March 1975 – 31 January 2007

City Councillor of Americana
- In office 31 January 1973 – 14 March 1975

Personal details
- Born: 20 May 1950 (age 76) Americana, São Paulo, Brazil
- Party: PSD (1988–2026); PSDB (1988–2026); PMDB (1970–1988)

Vanderlei Macris (born 20 May 1950) is a Brazilian politician and lawyer. Having been involved in politics since 1972, Macrus has spent his political career representing São Paulo, having served as state representative in the lower house of the national legislature from 1975 to 2007 and the state legislature from 2007 to 2011 and since 2012.

== Personal life ==
Macris was born to Ivo Macris and Laura Macris (née Tuckmantel) in the city of Americana. His son, Cauê Macris, is also a politician. Before entering politics Macris worked as a lawyer.

== Political career ==
From 1972 to 1974 Macris served in the city council of his home town of Americana. In 1975 he was elected to the São Paulo Legislative Assembly where he served as president from 1999 to 2001. In 2017 his son Cauê was elected president of the São Paulo Legislative Assembly, becoming the first father-son duo to have served as presidents.

In the 2006 Brazilian general election Macris was elected to the Federal Chamber of Deputies.

In May 2010 Macris voted in favour of the Ficha Limpa or "Clean Record Act" which barred politicians who had been impeached from holding office.

Macris voted in favor of the impeachment motion of then-president Dilma Rousseff. He voted in favor raising the spending ceiling of Brazil's government and the 2017 Brazilian labor reforms Macris voted in favor of a similar corruption investigation into Rousseff's successor Michel Temer.

In November 2016, Macris opposed "caixa 2" amnesty bill, along with fellow federal deputies Onyx Lorenzoni, Alessandro Molon, Fernando Francischini, Carlos Sampaio, Joaquim Passarinho, and Senators Alvaro Dias and Ana Amélia Lemos, listening to the claims of the civil society that signed for the approval of the 10 Anti-corruption Measures, and of the Public Prosecutor's Office, author of the bill.
