= Itamar Borges =

Brazilian politician (born 1969)

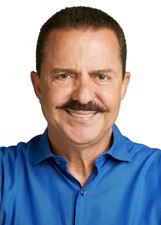
- Borges in 2024

Member of the Legislative Assembly of São Paulo
- Incumbent
- Assumed office 15 March 2011

Personal details
- Born: 21 December 1969 (age 56)
- Party: Brazilian Democratic Movement (since 1988)

Itamar Francisco Machado Borges (born 21 December 1969) is a Brazilian politician serving as a member of the Legislative Assembly of São Paulo since 2011. He served as mayor of Santa Fé do Sul from 1993 to 1996 and from 2001 to 2008.
