= Juliana Cardoso =

Brazilian politician

- Cardoso in 2025

Member of the Chamber of Deputies
- Incumbent
- Assumed office 1 February 2023
- Constituency: São Paulo

Member of the Municipal Chamber of São Paulo
- In office 1 January 2009 – 1 February 2023
- Constituency: At-large

Personal details
- Born: 22 October 1979 (age 47) São Paulo, Brazil
- Party: PT (1999–present)
- Website: julianacardosopt.com.br

Juliana Cardoso (born 22 October 1979) is a Brazilian labor activist and São Paulo city councilor for the Brazilian Workers' Party. For a time she was the only woman representing the Workers' Party to the São Paulo city council.

== Early life ==
Cardoso was born on the outskirts of the East Zone of the city of São Paulo (pt) in a family with Indigenous ancestry. Her first experiences of activism were as a volunteer with Basic ecclesial communities and the Catholic youth ministry (pt) there.

Before working on politics fulltime, she was an official with the São Paulo tourism board, where she specialised in work related to young people and the Carnival of São Paulo.

== Career ==
Cardoso was elected a city councilor for the first time in 2008, and she was re-elected in 2012 and then in 2016. For several of these years, Cardoso was the only woman representing the Workers' Party to the Brazilian city council. In 2016, she and Sâmia Bomfim were the only councilors who identified themselves as feminists.

Cardoso chaired the Human Rights Commission of the São Paulo city council.

As a legislator, Cardoso has focused on the rights of children and adolescents, women, public health, housing, and the arts. She was the sponsor of city law number 15945, to provide access to childbirth services, and of city law number 15248 to create the Conselho Municipal dos Povos Indígenas (the Municipal Council for Indigenous Peoples). Cardoso also pushed to allow breastfeeding in daycare centers.

Cardoso created the Heleieth Saffioti Award, which is awarded to those who advance the rights of women in São Paulo.

In 2017, Cardoso was assaulted during a riot in the City Hall parking lot, and was illegally detained by the metropolitan police.
