= Guilherme Derrite =

Brazilian politician (born 1984)

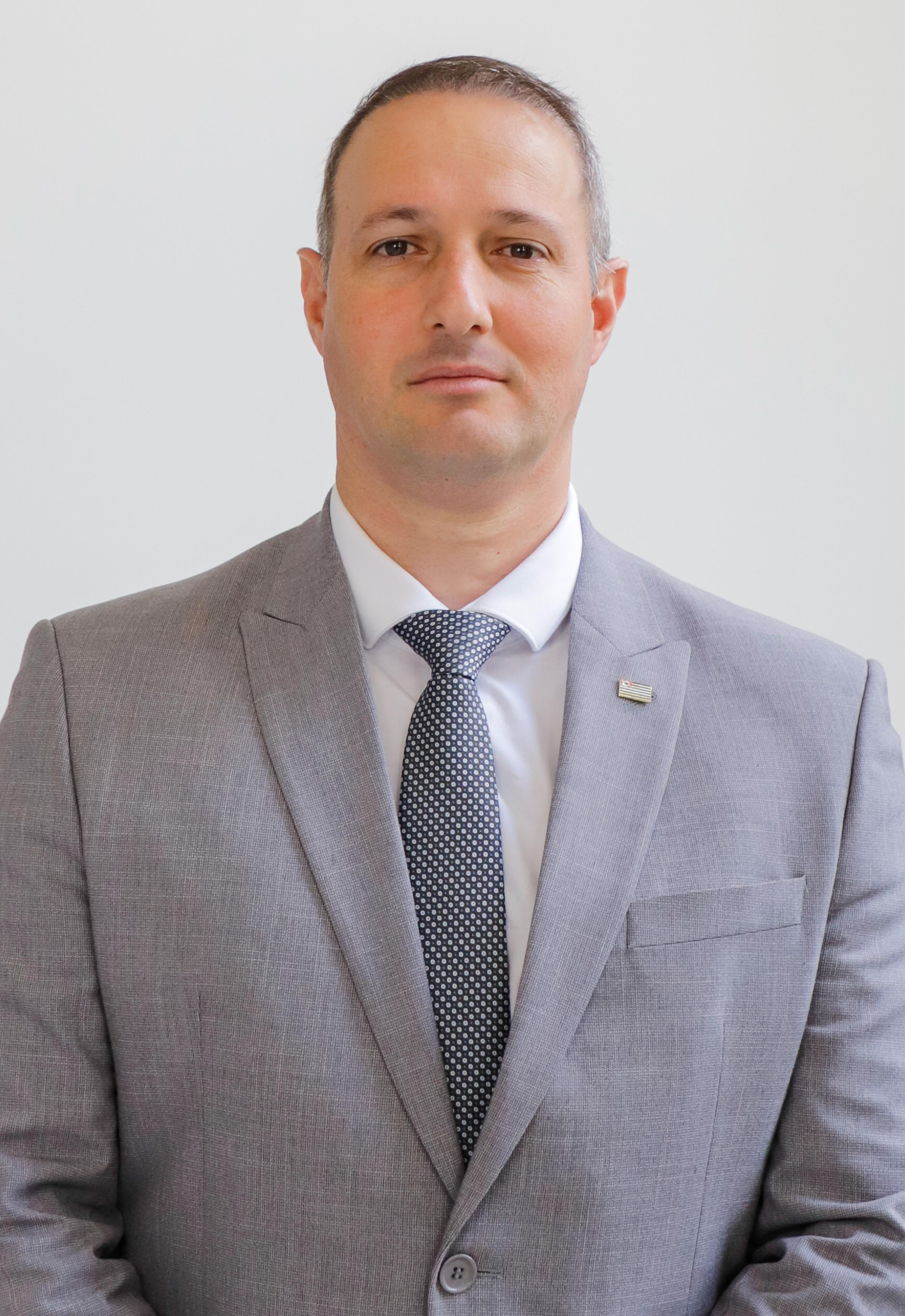
- Derrite in 2023

Senator-elect for São Paulo
- Assuming office 1 February 2027

Federal Deputy
- Incumbent
- Assumed office 1 February 2019
- Constituency: São Paulo

Secretary of Public Security of São Paulo
- In office 1 January 2023 – 1 December 2025
- Governor: Tarcísio de Freitas
- Preceded by: João Camilo Pires de Campos
- Succeeded by: Osvaldo Nico Gonçalves

Personal details
- Born: Guilherme Muraro Derrite; 10 October 1984 (age 41) Sorocaba, São Paulo, Brazil
- Party: PP (since 2025)
- Other political affiliations: PP (2018–2022); PL (2022–2025)

Military service
- Branch/service: Military Police of São Paulo State
- Years of service: 2003–2018
- Rank: Captain

Guilherme Muraro Derrite (born 10 October 1984) is a Brazilian politician serving as secretary of public security of São Paulo since 2023. He is a member of the Chamber of Deputies since 2019.

Political offices
Preceded by João Camilo Pires de Campos	Secretary of Public Security of São Paulo; 2023–2025	Succeeded by Osvaldo Nico Gonçalves
