= Soninha Francine =

Brazilian journalist, television presenter and politician

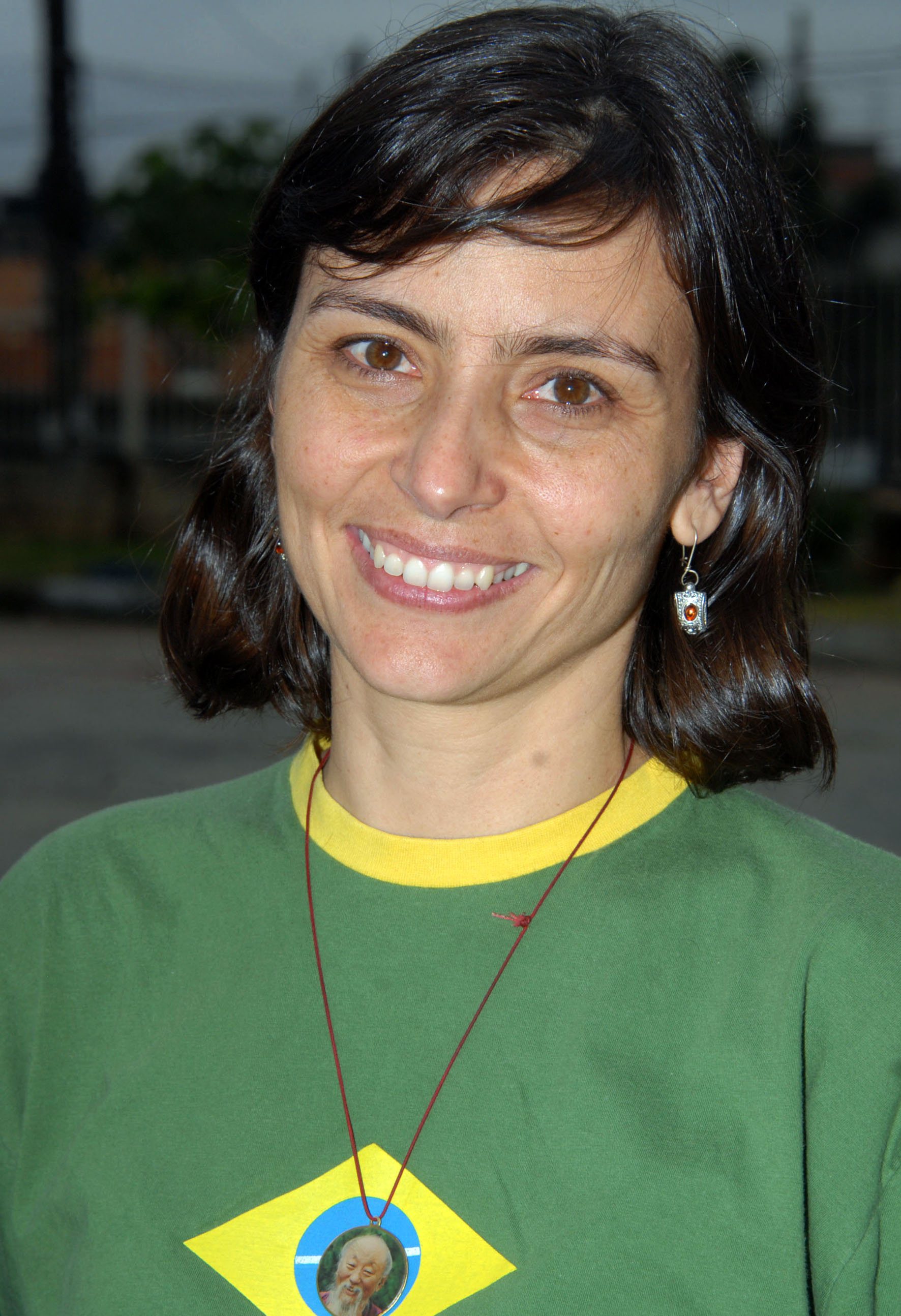

City Councillor of São Paulo
- In office 1 January 2017 – 1 January 2021
- In office 1 January 2005 – 1 January 2009

Municipal Secretary of Social Assistance of São Paulo
- In office 1 January 2017 – 17 April 2017
- Mayor: João Doria
- Preceded by: Luciana Temer
- Succeeded by: Filipe Sabará

Personal details
- Born: Sonia Francine Gaspar Marmo; 25 August 1967 (age 59) São Paulo, Brazil
- Party: Cidadania (2007–present)
- Other political affiliations: PT (1988–2007)
- Profession: Journalist

Sonia Francine Gaspar Marmo (August 25, 1967), called Soninha Francine, is a Brazilian journalist, television presenter and politician.

Born in the Santana neighborhood in São Paulo, she graduated in cinema from University of São Paulo's School of Communications and Arts (ECA-USP), and participated in some films made by students of the cinema course at ECA, as well as a stage actress, but became nationally known as VJ of MTV Brasil.

== Career on media ==
Soninha started working at MTV in São Paulo as a production assistant, then as a director and production coordinator, and then a writer, writing the texts for the VJs. In 1994, she started to work as a presenter herself, replacing the VJs. She stayed at the station for ten years.

In 2000, she joined TV Cultura as a host of the "RG" program, aimed at young people. During this period, she became involved in a controversial episode: a cover story in Época magazine, where she admitted that she was a marijuana user and defended its decriminalization. After the story, TV Cultura terminated her contract

== Political career ==
In 2004, she ran for and won the election for city councilor of the city of São Paulo by the Partido dos Trabalhadores - PT, with a total of 50,989 votes, exercising her term until 2008. In the São Paulo City Council, she defended issues related to LGBT rights youth, sport, culture, accessibility, information technology and knowledge democratization, housing and the environment.

She was a proponent and rapporteur of the Parliamentary Commission of Inquiry for Labor Analogous to Slavery in the municipality of São Paulo and rapporteur of the Parliamentary Commission for Studies on Climate Change and its effects in the municipality of São Paulo.

In 2006, she ran for the election for federal deputy for PT, but was not elected, receiving a total of 44,953 votes.

In 2008 she ran for mayor of São Paulo, after switching PT for PPS. Soninha got 266,978 votes (4.19% of total votes).In 2009, she was named sub-mayor of Lapa by the mayor of São Paulo, Gilberto Kassab. She remained in the position until March 31, 2010, when she left with the intention of running for Governor of São Paulo state, which ended up not happening as her party decided to support the Brazilian Social Democracy Party candidate Geraldo Alckmin. Then, in the same year, she was editor of the official website of José Serra's campaign for president.

In February 2011, she assumed the position of superintendent at SUTACO, from which she left in June 2012 to run for the second time for the city of São Paulo. She got 162,384 votes (2.65% of valid votes) in the 1st round. In the 2nd, she declared support for José Serra's candidacy.

In 2013, she wrote the Blog Tecla Sap, "Translating Politics to Portuguese".

In 2015, she was invited, by governor Geraldo Alckmin, to assume the Coordination of Policies for Sexual Diversity in São Paulo. In the 2016 municipal elections, Soninha was elected councilwoman with 40,113 votes.

Political offices
Preceded by Luciana Temer	Municipal Secretary of Social Assistance of São Paulo; 2017	Succeeded by Filipe Sabará
