= Marcio Alvino =

Brazilian politician (born 1969)

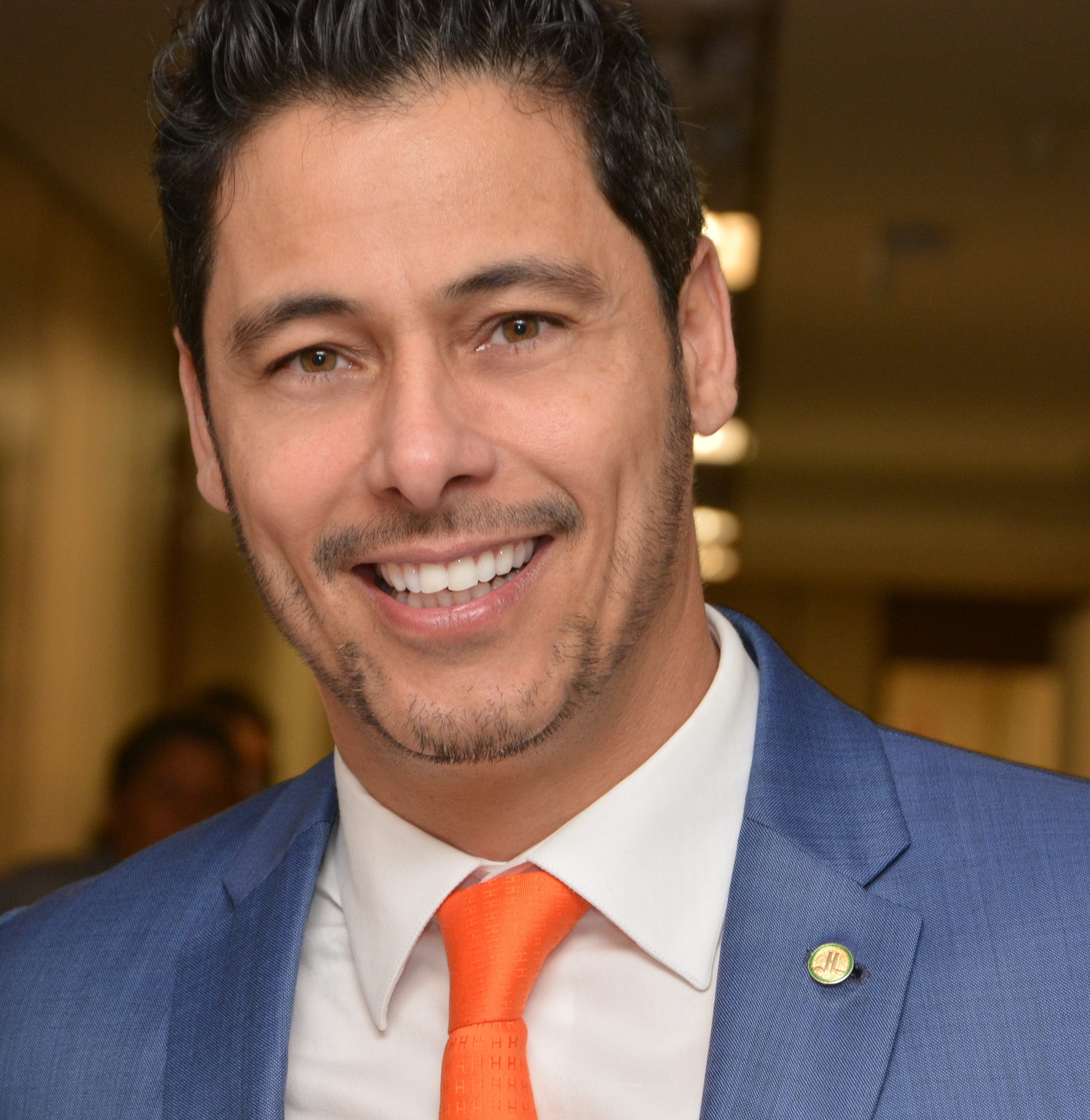
- Alvino in 2022

Member of the Chamber of Deputies
- Incumbent
- Assumed office 1 February 2015
- Constituency: São Paulo

Personal details
- Born: 14 June 1969 (age 57)
- Party: Liberal Party (since 2006)

Marcio Luiz Alvino de Souza (born 14 June 1969) is a Brazilian politician serving as a member of the Chamber of Deputies since 2015. From 2009 to 2014, he served as mayor of Guararema.
