= Legislative Assembly of São Paulo =

Legislature of São Paulo state in Brazil

Coordinates: 23°34′52″S 46°39′30″W

Legislative Assembly of the State of São Paulo Assembleia Legislativa do Estado de São Paulo
- 20th Legislature of the Legislative Assembly

Type
- Type: Unicameral
- Term limits: None

History
- Founded: 28 March 1947
- Preceded by: Legislative Congress of São Paulo
- New session started: 15 March 2023

Leadership
- President: André do Prado, PL since 15 March 2023
- Government Leader: Gilmaci Santos, Republicanos since 9 August 2024
- Minority Leader: Beth Sahão, PT since 12 March 2026

Structure
- Seats: 94
- Political groups: Government (53) PL (19) UNIÃO (9) Republicanos (8) PSD (5) MDB (4) PODE (4) PP (3) NOVO (1) Opposition (29) FE Brasil (19): PT (18); PCdoB (1); PSOL REDE Fdr. (6): PSOL (5); REDE (1); PSB (3) PDT (1) Independent (12) PSDB Cidadania Fdr. (12): PSDB (9); Cidadania (3)
- Length of term: 4 years

Elections
- Voting system: Open list proportional representation (D'Hondt method)
- Last election: 4 October 2026
- Next election: 7 October 2030

Meeting place
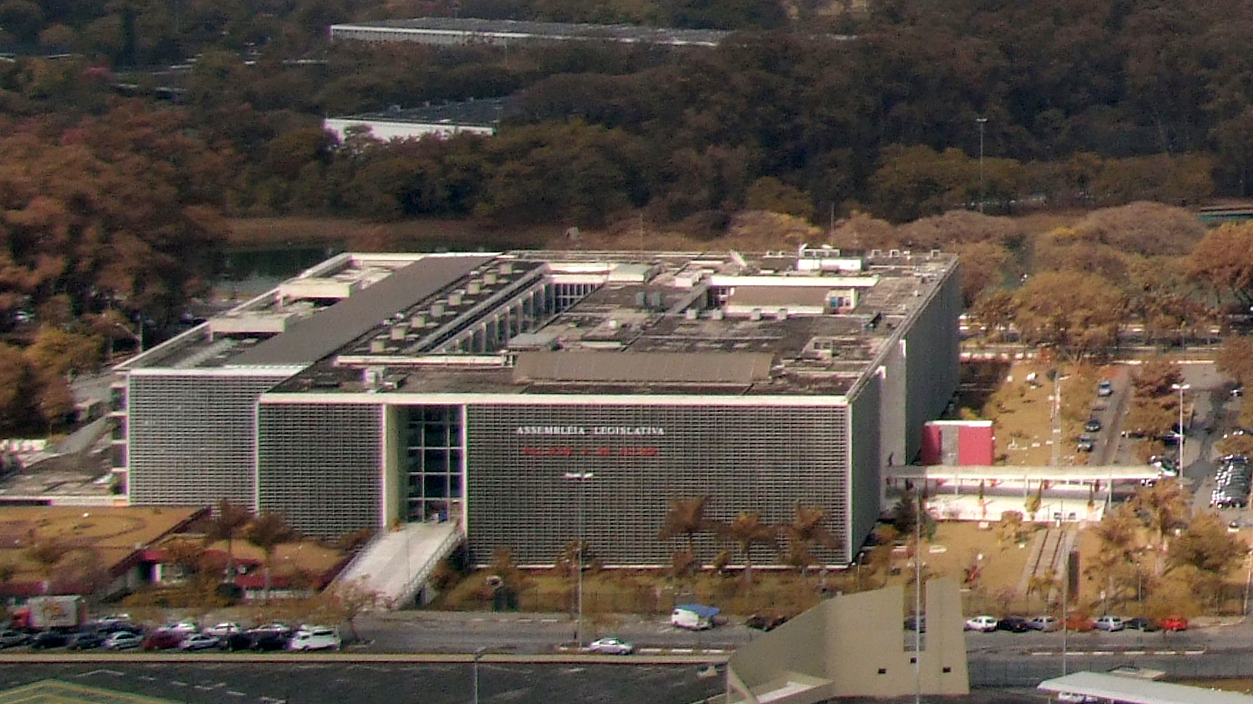
- 9th of July Palace; São Paulo, Brazil

Website
- www.al.sp.gov.br

The Legislative Assembly of the State of São Paulo (Portuguese: Assembleia Legislativa do Estado de São Paulo) is the unicameral legislative branch of São Paulo state in Brazil. The building where the legislative assembly is located, right by the main park of the city, also houses one of six Poupatempo units in the city.

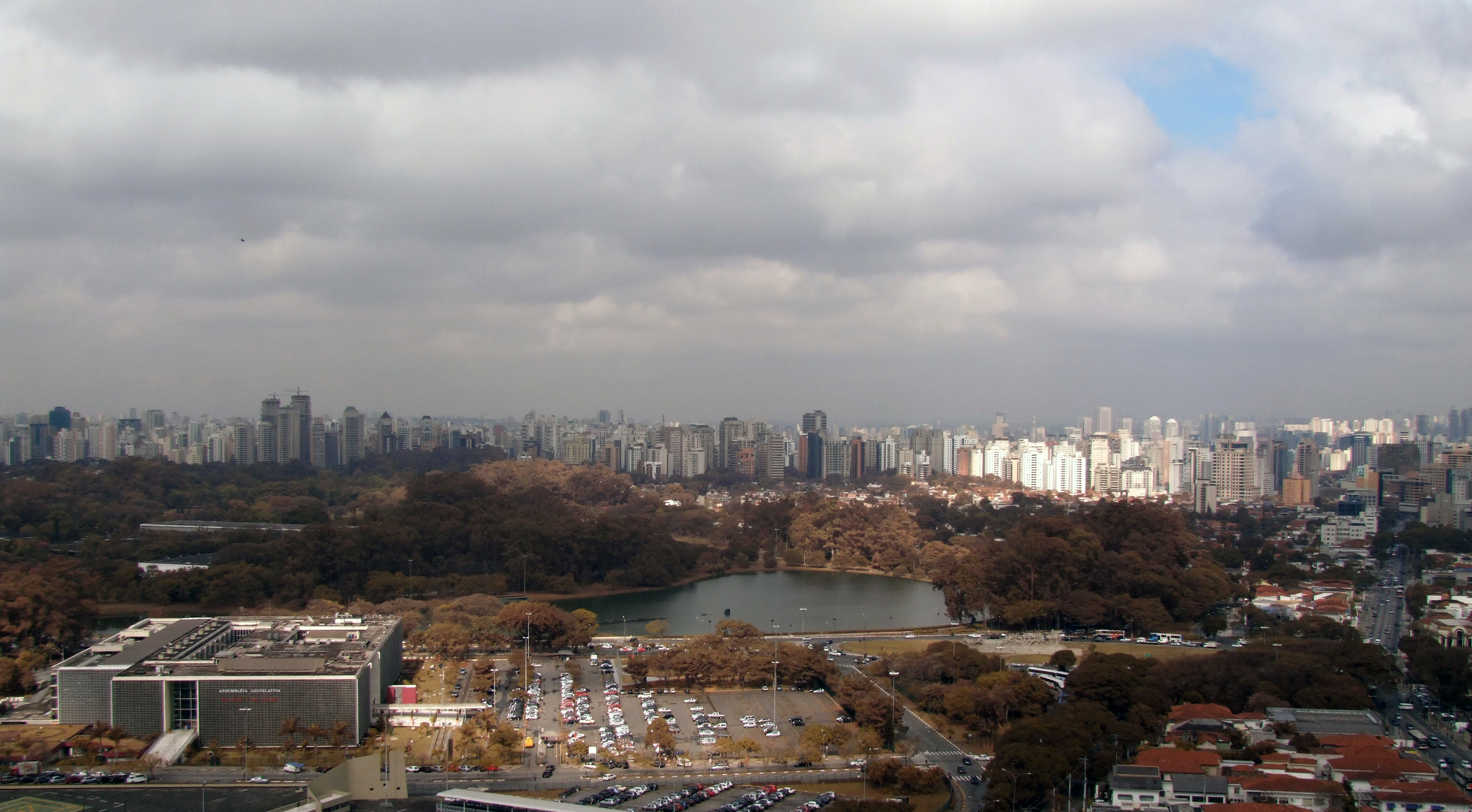
Legislative Assembly of the State of São Paulo and Ibirapuera Park

== Presidents ==
- Valentim Gentil - 1947 to 1948
- José Milliet Filho - 1948
- Francisco Álvares Florence - 1948
- Lincoln Feliciano da Silva - 1948 to 1949
- Brasílio Augusto Machado de Oliveira Neto - 1949 to 1951
- Diógenes Augusto Ribeiro de Lima - 1951 to 1952
- Asdrúbal Euritysses da Silva - 1952 to 1953
- Victor Maida - 1953 to 1954
- Vicente de Paula Lima - 1954 to 1955
- Vicente Botta - 1955
- André Franco Montoro - 1955 to 1956
- Ruy de Almeida Barbosa - 1956 to 1959
- Guilherme de Oliveira Gomes - 1959
- Francisco Franco - 1959
- Ruy de Mello Junqueira - 1959 to 1960
- Roberto Costa do Abreu Sodré - 1960 to 1963
- Cyro Albuquerque - 1963 to 1965
- Francisco Franco - 1965 to 1967
- Nelson Agostinho de Cápua Pereira - 1967 to 1970
- Orlando Gabriel Zancaner - 1970 to 1971
- Manoel Alexandre Marcondes Machado Filho - 1971
- Jacob Pedro Carolo - 1971 to 1973
- José Salvador Julianelli - 1973 to 1975
- Januário Mantelli Neto - 1975
- Leonel Júlio - 1975 to 1976
- Vicente Botta - 1976 to 1977
- Natal Gale - 1977 to 1979
- Robson Riedel Marinho - 1979 to 1981
- Januário Mantelli Neto - 1981 to 1983
- Néfi Teles - 1983 to 1985
- Luiz Carlos Santos - 1985 to 1987
- Luiz Benedicto Maximo - 1987 to 1989
- Antonio Cleidenir Tonico Ramos - 1989 to 1991
- Carlos Alberto Eugênio Apolinário - 1991 to 1993
- Vitor Sapienza - 1993 to 1995
- José Ricardo Alvarenga Tripoli - 1995 to 1997
- Paulo Setti Kobayashi - 1997 to 1999
- José Carlos Vaz de Lima - 1999
- Vanderlei Macris - 1999 to 2001
- Walter Meyer Feldman - 2001 to 2003
- Juscelino Cardoso de Sá - 2003
- Sidney Estanislay Beraldo - 2003 to 2005
- Rodrigo Garcia - 2005 to 2007
- Vaz de Lima - 2007 to 2009
- Barros Munhoz - 2009 to 2013
- Samuel Moreira - 2013 to 2015
- Fernando Capez - 2015 to 2017
- Cauê Macris - 2017 to 2021
- Carlos Pignatari - 2021 to 2023
- André do Prado - Since 2023

== Present composition ==
Parties in the 20th Legislative Assembly
Party	Floor leader	Seats
Liberal Party	Carlos Cezar	19
Brazil of Hope Federation	Paulo Fiorilo	18
PSDB Cidadania Federation	Vinicius Camarinha	12
Brazil Union	Milton Leite Filho	9
Republicanos	Altair Moraes	8
PSOL REDE Federation	Monica Seixas	6
Social Democratic Party	Paulo Correa Jr.	5
Brazilian Democratic Movement	Itamar Borges	4
Podemos	Gerson Pessoa	4
Brazilian Socialist Party	Caio França	3
Progressistas	Delegado Olim	3
Democratic Labour Party	Marcio Nakashima	1
New Party	Leonardo Siqueira	1
Total		94

=== Partisan blocs composition ===
Partisan bloc leadership is organized into the following roles:

- Government Leader: elected by members of the party of the Cabinet in the Assembly to speak on behalf of the Cabinet
- Minority Leader: elected by the members of the largest party in opposition to the Cabinet

Bloc	Deputies	Leader
Government	53	Jorge Wilson (Republicanos)
Minority	29	Enio Tatto (PT)

== See also ==
- Museum of Art of the Parliament of São Paulo
