= First presidency of Lula da Silva =

Brazilian presidential administration from 2003 to 2010

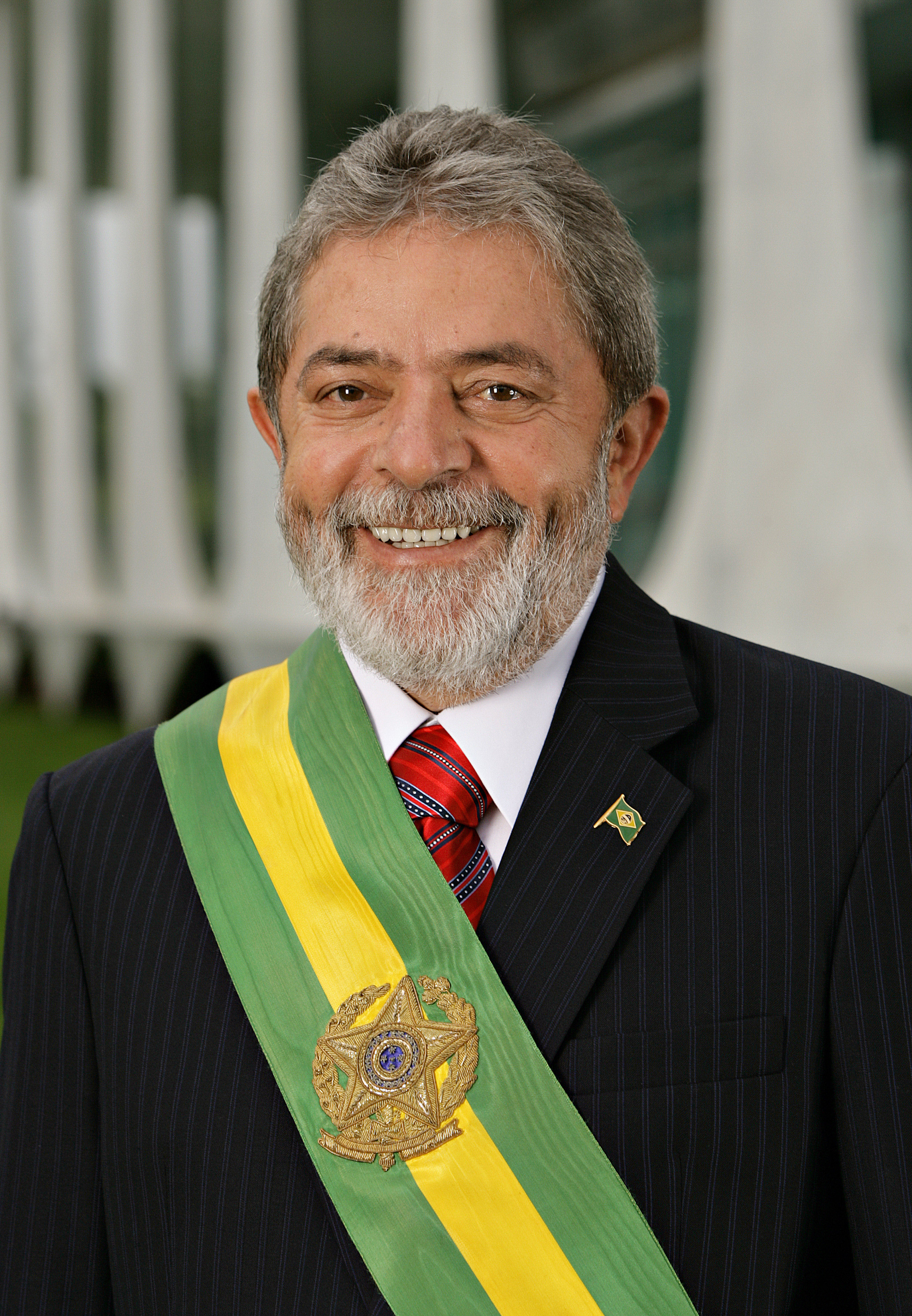
- First presidency of Lula da Silva; 1 January 2003 – 1 January 2011
- Vice President: José Alencar
- Cabinet: See list
- Party: Workers'
- Election: 2002; 2006
- Seat: Palácio do Planalto

The first tenure of Luiz Inácio Lula da Silva as the president of Brazil began on 1 January 2003 when Lula was inaugurated as the 35th president, and ended on 1 January 2011. A Workers' Party candidate, it was his fourth candidacy for this office and after defeating the PSDB candidate, José Serra, with 61.27% of the valid votes in a second round. Lula was the first former worker to become president of Brazil, and he governed the country for two consecutive terms (2003 until 2006, and from 2007 until 2010). In October 2006, Lula was reelected to the presidency, defeating the PSDB candidate Geraldo Alckmin in the second round, obtaining more than 60% of the valid votes against 39.17% for his opponent. His term in office ended on 1 January 2011. Lula's government ended with record approval from the population, with more than 80% positive ratings.

Its main hallmarks were the maintenance of economic stability, the resumption of the country's growth, and the reduction of poverty and social inequality. His first presidency registered the highest average GDP growth in two decades, around 4.1%, and total growth was 32.62%. Per capita income grew 23.05%, with an average of 2.8%. The growth was driven by the rise in commodity prices, domestic demand, helped by programs like Bolsa Família and the reduction in international interest rates. Despite economic growth, productivity has not increased along with it. Lula took office with inflation at 12.53% and delivered at 5.90%.

One of Lula's campaign platforms was the need for constitutional reforms. A relevant reform that took place during Lula's government was the approval of Constitutional Amendment 45, in 2004, which became known as the "Judiciary Reform".

His first presidency was also notable for the country's quest to host major sporting events. The 2007 Pan-American Games took place during his mandate. So did the choice of Brazil to host the 2014 FIFA World Cup and the 2016 Olympic Games. The decisions generated controversy about the losses and legacies of each event.

In 2009, the penultimate year of the Lula administration, an annual study conducted by the NGO Transparency International reported that Brazil ranked 75th in a ranking of 180 countries on perceived corruption. The study gave Brazil a score of 3.7, which indicates corruption problems, according to the entity. Brazil got worse in the ranking between 2002 (score 4.0, 45th in the ranking) and 2009 (score 3.7, 75th in the ranking), having dropped 30 places. In 2008, The Economist's Democracy Index ranked Brazil the 41st most democratic country in the world.

== Manifesto ==
Still during the election campaign, Lula wrote the Letter to the Brazilian people where he assured that in case of his victory his party, the Workers', would respect national and international contracts. The letter was read on 22 June 2002 during a meeting about the party's government programme.

== Inaugurations ==
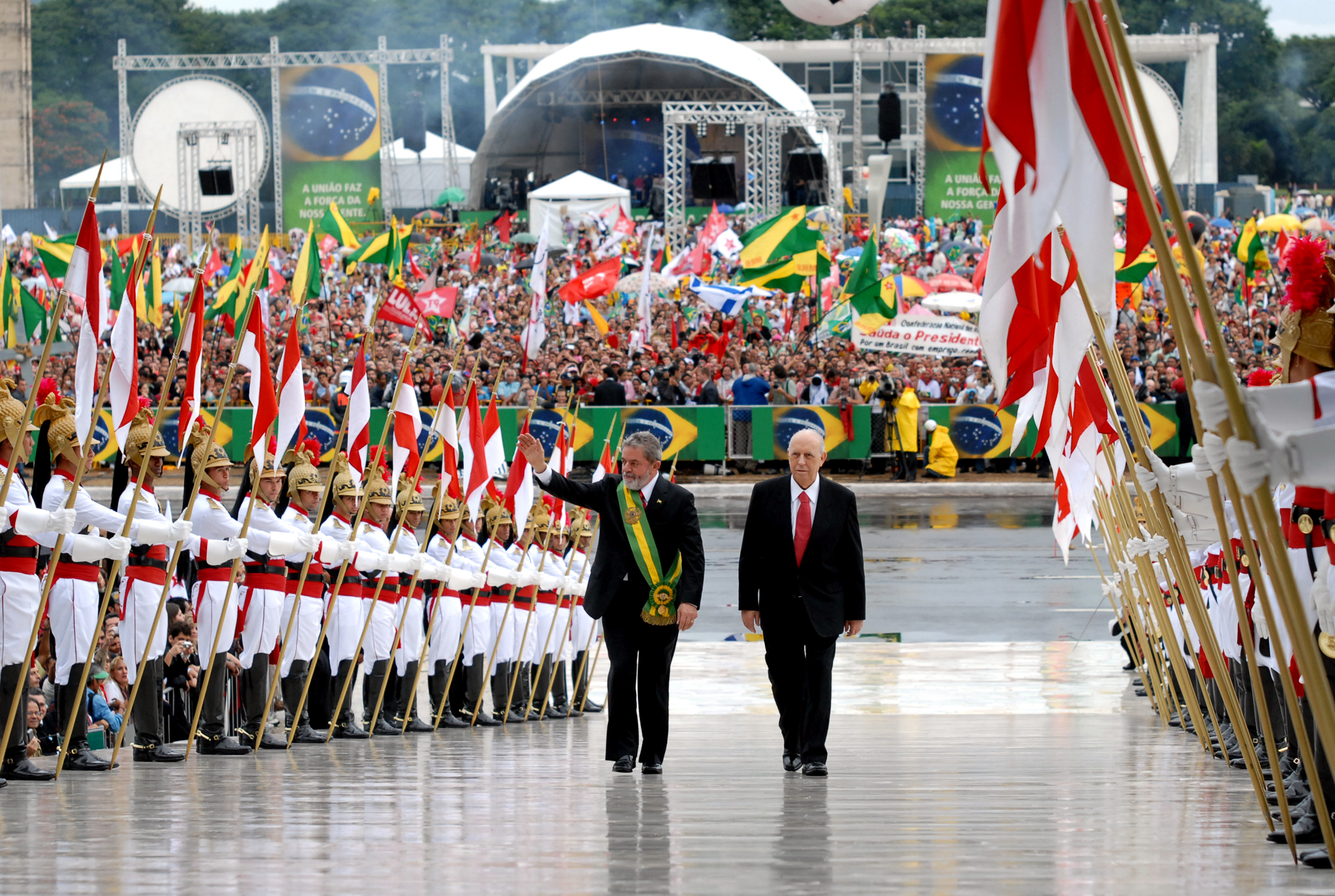
Alongside his vice-president José Alencar, Lula walks up the ramp of the Planalto Palace at the inauguration ceremony for his second term, 1 January 2007

Luiz Inácio Lula da Silva took office on 1 January 2003, having been elected president in 2002. He was the second Brazilian president to take office on this date, the third president elected since the end of the military dictatorship, and the first socialist-oriented former worker to assume the Presidency of Brazil.

Lula's second inauguration took place on 1 January 2007. He was sworn in again with the vice-president, José Alencar. The ceremony began shortly after 4pm in the plenary of the National Congress in Brasilia and was presided over by then Senate President Renan Calheiros. As in the inauguration of the first mandate, the reelected president and vice-president read and signed the term of office, and then the national anthem was played by the Marine Band.

== Internal policy ==
=== Economy ===
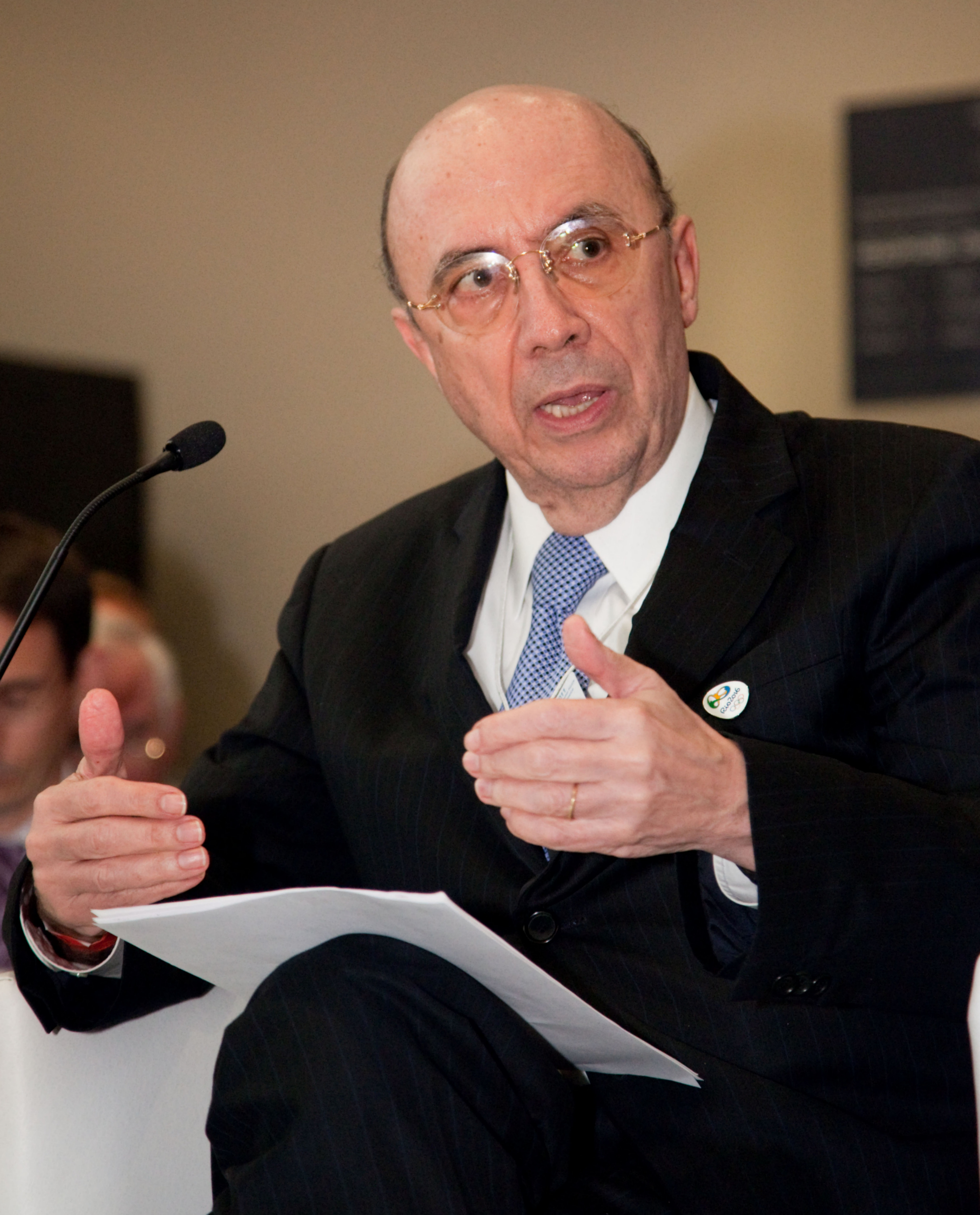
Henrique Meirelles, president of Central Bank since the start of Lula's presidency

Lula was elected in a difficult economic context, and his administration began by following the economic policy of the previous government, FHC. To this end, he nominated Henrique Meirelles, a federal deputy elected by the PSDB of Goiás in 2002, to head the Brazilian Central Bank, sending a strong signal to the market – especially the international market, where Meirelles is well known for having been the president of Bank Boston – that there would be no abrupt changes in the conduct of economic policy in his government. He appointed Antônio Palocci, a sanitarian physician and former mayor of Ribeirão Preto, a member of the Workers' Party, as Minister of Finance. After repeated accusations against Palocci by the media, in the case known as "Scandal of the breach of the bank secrecy of Francenildo, the bank teller", Palocci resigned (on 27 August 2009, the STF dismissed the accusation against Palocci). His replacement was the economist and university professor Guido Mantega, who took over the ministry on 27 March 2006.

The Lula administration was characterized by low inflation, which was under control, reduction in unemployment and constant records in the balance of trade. During President Lula's administration there was a record production in the automobile industry in 2005, the largest real growth in the minimum wage and reduction of the Gini coefficient.

In 2010, Alan Mulally, Ford's global president, stated that thanks to the incentive programmes of Lula's government, it was possible for the country to effectively come out of the world crisis. During the crisis the GDP retraction was only 0.2%, showing a better result than the major economies of the world.

The economic growth was driven by the commodities boom, the reduction in international interest rates, and the increase in domestic consumption, supported by the increase in the minimum wage and income transfer programmes such as Bolsa Família.

=== Social policy ===
In 2010, the IBRD stated that the country had advanced in reducing poverty and in income distribution. According to the institution, although social inequality was still high, the poverty rate had been reduced from 41% in 1990 to 25.6% in 2006, thanks to advances carried out by the administrations of Collor, Itamar, FHC and Lula. Some of the reasons for the reduction were said to be low inflation and income transfer programs.

Logo and slogan, Brazil, a country for all, used during the Lula administration

Inequality between the richest and the poorest is said to have increased between 2001 and 2003, according to a publication by O Globo in February 2005. After Lula took office, however, a report by the IBGE at the end of November 2007 stated that President Lula's government was making Brazil a less unequal country. Based on the PNAD (National Household Sample Survey), the FGV published a study showing percentages comparing the period since the year Lula took office.

Between 2002 and 2007, Brazil, although it improved its HDI (Human Development Index) from 0.790 to 0.813, fell from 63rd place to 75th place in the world ranking of countries. The study is published by the UNDP (United Nations Development Programme), which explained the country's drop to 75th place by two factors: the entry of new countries into the survey and updated data, which benefited countries such as Russia. Countries considered to have "High Human Development" are those with an HDI above 0.800. In the survey referring to 2007, a new category of countries was included in the ranking: "Very High" HDI, with a figure above 0.900.

In the 2010 survey, the final year of the Lula administration, Brazil still stood in a distant 73rd position among 169 countries. Because of changes in methodology, the organizers of the survey emphasized that the 2010 HDI cannot be compared to the HDI of previous years, which used a different methodology. According to the report, Brazil's HDI shows a "trend of sustained growth over the years".

With regard to infant mortality, the Lula administration followed the downward trend that has been observed in Brazil since 1930. Between 1996 and 2000 the reduction was 20.5%, and between 2000 and 2004 the reduction was 15.9%.

The‘Light for All’ program was introduced to increase access to electricity and a Unified Social Assistance system was set up, in which the state (as noted by one study) “effectively takes responsibility for the protection of the poorest.” In addition, the percentage of Brazilians covered by social security rose; from 45% to 51% during the course of Lula's first presidency.

==== Bolsa Família ====
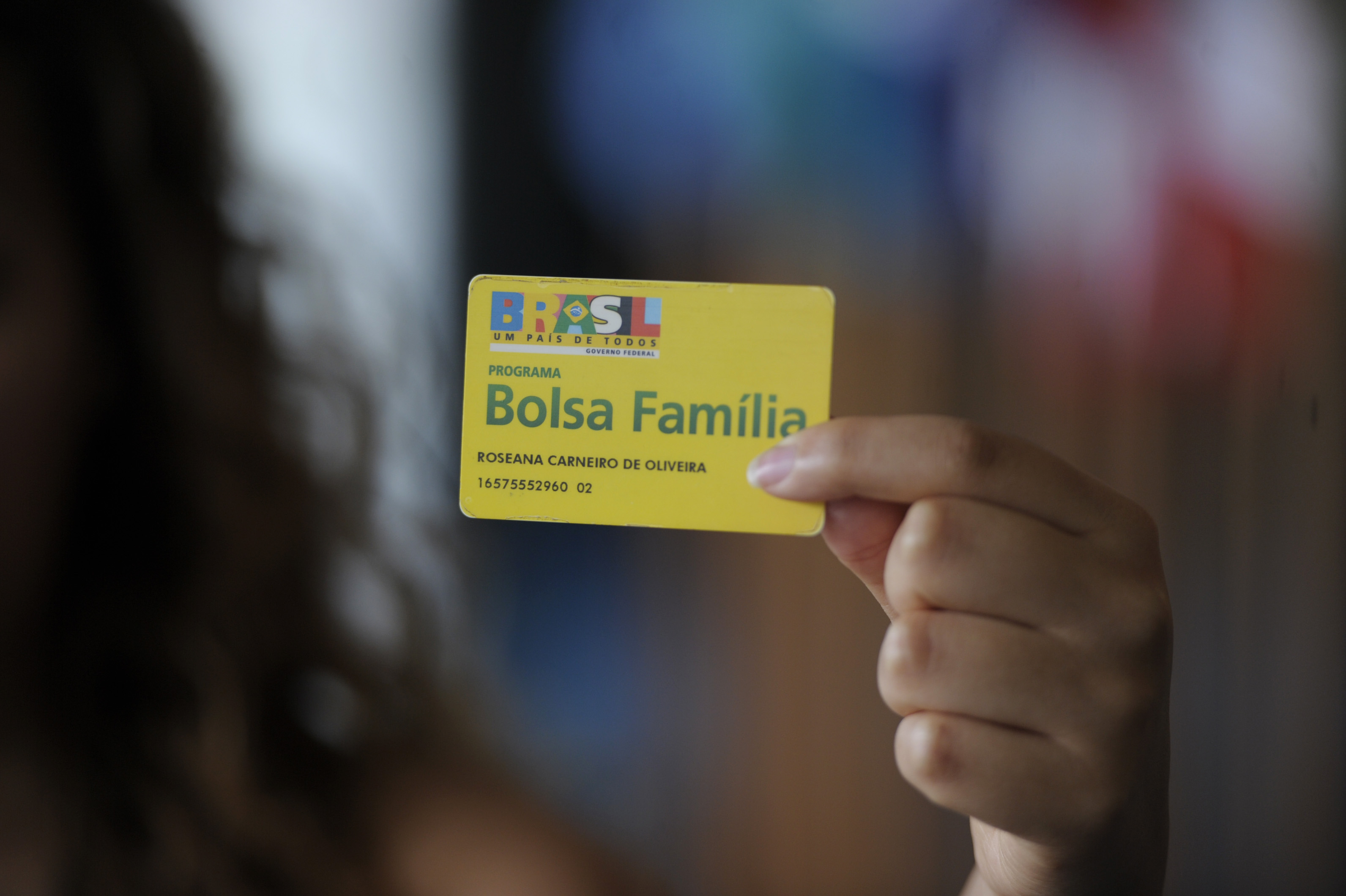
Card used by beneficiaries of Bolsa Família.

A well-known social program of the Lula administration is Bolsa Família, created by Law No. 10,836 of 9 January 2004, and regulated by Decree No. 5,209 of 17 September 2004. The purpose of the program, which serves about 12.4 million inhabitants, is the direct transfer of income from the government to poor families (monthly income per person between R$ 69.01 and R$ 137.00) and those in extreme poverty (monthly income per person up to R$ 69.00). The program was a reformulation and expansion of the Bolsa Escola program of the Fernando Henrique Cardoso administration, which covered 5.1 million families. There are concerns that the program is a way of buying votes, that there is no strict control against fraud, and that there is a risk of it becoming a permanent source of income for beneficiaries. Despite this, Bolsa Família is also praised by specialists for being a financial complement to ease hunger for families in precarious financial situations. It is also identified as one of the factors that enabled families from the poorest classes to consume more products, which benefits the country's economy.

Bolsa Família was considered one of the main poverty-combat programs in the world, having been described as "an anti-poverty scheme invented in Latin America (that) is winning converts worldwide" by the British The Economist. According to the publication, governments all over the world are watching the program. The French newspaper Le Monde reported: "The Bolsa Família program above all expands access to education, which represents the best weapon, in Brazil or anywhere on the planet, against poverty."

==== Fome Zero ====
Logo of the Fome Zero program.

Upon assuming the Presidency of the Republic, Lula said that during his administration he wanted to see every Brazilian have "three meals a day". This guideline led the PT government to implement, in February 2003, the Fome Zero Program (PFZ) as the guiding plan for policies directed at social segments that were living below a socially acceptable standard.

— International Policy Centre for Inclusive Growth

The Fome Zero program began as an attempt by the President of the Republic to mobilize the masses in favor of the neediest people in Brazil. The program caused the attention of international governments to turn to Brazil, and Luiz Inácio was highly praised by international organizations. The goal was the bold task of eradicating hunger in four years and reducing undernourishment by 2015. For a series of reasons, it was not fully carried out and was replaced by Bolsa Família.

Fome Zero was cited by critics as one of the main failures of the Lula administration, according to the Jornal do Brasil. It was, however, praised by the Secretary-General of the UN, Ban Ki-moon, who, in 2010, during participation in the III Forum of the Alliance of Civilizations, said that the program, together with Bolsa Família, made "a great difference" for Brazil.

==== Primeiro Emprego ====
The Lula administration launched the Primeiro Emprego program in 2003, a campaign banner of Lula's 2002 election. However, the program did not take off: it was discontinued in 2006, having managed to employ fewer than 15,000 young people, when the initial plan was 260,000 vacancies per year. In 2007, the program, which gave advantages to companies that offered jobs to young people aged 16 to 24, was excluded from the PPA (Pluriannual Plan) 2008-2011 project. As the PPA guides budgets for each four-year period, this meant the end of funding for Primeiro Emprego from 2008 onward. In 2009, the government considered reviving the program, but there was no consensus on the matter.

==== Fight against slavery ====
The fight against slavery and degrading labor conditions was strengthened under President Lula's administration. When Lula took office, FHC had left a National Plan for the Eradication of Slave Labor, a basis on which the Lula government could work. The result was that, between 1995 and 2002, 5,893 people were rescued from slave labor, and between 2003 and 2009 Brazil rescued 32,986 people from conditions of slave labor, most of them during the Lula administration. However, punishments for slave labor in Brazil are sometimes limited to labor compensation, such as those undertaken by the Votorantim Group, but there has already been progress and convictions for such crime. According to the ILO (International Labour Organization), to this day there has been only one conviction in the country with effective prison time served, with the usual sanctions being only fines, compensation to victims, and blocking company records from receiving financing.

=== Health ===
The Ministry of Health launched the Brasil Sorridente program on 17 March 2004, with the objective of expanding access to dental treatment in the country, and it was the first national policy specifically directed at oral health in Brazil. The program proposed the expansion and qualification of primary care by incorporating Oral Health Teams into Primary Care through the Family Health Strategy, as well as offering more services through the creation of Dental Specialty Centers for medium- and high-complexity care.

The Farmácia Popular (PFPB) is a program of the National Pharmaceutical Assistance Policy of the Federal government of Brazil, created on 13 April 2004 by Law No. 10,858. It is developed in partnership with municipal governments throughout the country, with the purpose of offering commonly used medicines at reduced prices through its own establishments or accredited private pharmacies.

The mobile pre-hospital care services, called Mobile Emergency Care Services (SAMU), and activated by quick-dial telephone service (number 192), known as SAMU 192, were standardized in Brazil from 2004 onward by presidential decree of the Lula administration, No. 5,055, of 27 April 2004. They are characterized by providing assistance to people in urgent situations at the scenes where these occur, ensuring early care appropriate to the pre-hospital environment and access to the Health System.

In December 2004, President Lula authorized the creation of Hemobrás (Brazilian Company of Hemoderivatives and Biotechnology), a state-owned enterprise aimed at researching, developing and producing medicines blood-derived and biotechnological products primarily to serve patients of the Unified Health System (SUS).

Basic Health Units (UBS) became the designation adopted in Brazil from 2007 onward through the Growth Acceleration Program (PAC). These units perform the same functions as the former Health Posts, with that designation being gradually replaced by Basic Health Unit.

Within the organization of a national urgent-care policy, in addition to mobile emergency care services (SAMU), the Emergency Care Units (UPA) were implemented, intermediate units between primary care and hospital emergencies. The first Emergency Care Units were implemented by the State Department of Health of the state of Rio de Janeiro in 2007 before federal regulation, through Ordinance No. 1020 of 13 May 2009, which adopted the nomenclature.

The PAC was an important source of funding for the UPAs, and the government announced that it would build 500 by the end of the administration.

In health, the Lula administration was also acting with investments considered insufficient for the country's needs. Representatives of the Ministry of Health said at the end of 2009 that the country was below the minimum necessary for universal health standards. According to the Ministry of Health's Economics Department, the percentage of expenditure allocated to Health in relation to GDP (Gross Domestic Product) in Brazil was far below that of other countries. The average in universal systems, according to the WHO (World Health Organization), was 6.5% of GDP. In Brazil, in 2007, public spending on Health was around 3.5% of GDP. In that year, spending on health goods and services in Brazil was R$ 224.5 billion, or 8.4% of GDP, with 4.8% being household spending and 3.5% government spending. According to the Ministry of Health, the country's public spending in the sector (41.6%) was below the average of the OECD (Organisation for Economic Co-operation and Development), which was 72%.

According to data released by the IBGE at the end of 2009, Brazilian families spent ten times more on medicines than the country's government. The Ministry of Health stated, however, that there was excessive household spending on medicines due to consumption without medical prescription. According to IBGE researchers, even though the government had increased spending on the sector, the public share was still small compared, for example, to Mexico and other countries with the same type of profile, whose public spending on Health averaged 70%, with 30% borne by families.

In 2009 the country invested 7.5% of GDP in Health, while other countries, such as the United States, invested twice as much (15.3%). The then Minister of Health, José Gomes Temporão, criticized the resources allocated to his ministry. According to the minister, the R$ 66.9 billion provided for 2010 in the Union Budget did not meet the demands of his department.

==== Labor policy ====
Various reforms affecting working conditions were carried out during Lula’s first presidency. Law 10.666 of 2003 provided for special retirement benefits to be granted to members of production or work cooperatives while Law 11.648/2008 provided legal recognition to trade union federations as entities that represent workers. Law 11.770 of 2008 allowed for extended paternity and maternity leave in some companies, and Law No. 12,353/10 provided for employee participation on the boards of directors of various companies.

=== Educational policy ===
In the area of higher education, the ProUni (University for All Program) was, according to statements by the Ministry of Education, the largest scholarship program in the history of Brazilian education. From 2005 to 2009, ProUni offered almost 600,000 scholarships at approximately 1,500 educational institutions throughout the country, which in return received the benefit of tax exemption. Among the scholarship recipients, 46% were self-identified Afro-descendants.

The program includes initiatives such as granting aid of R$ 300.00 to full-scholarship students enrolled in courses with at least six hours of classes per day (Bolsa-Permanência). ProUni scholarship holders also have priority in the Ministry of Education's Student Financing Fund for Higher Education (Fies) and in an agreement signed with Caixa Econômica Federal (CEF) to offer internships among program beneficiaries.

— Revista Brasilis

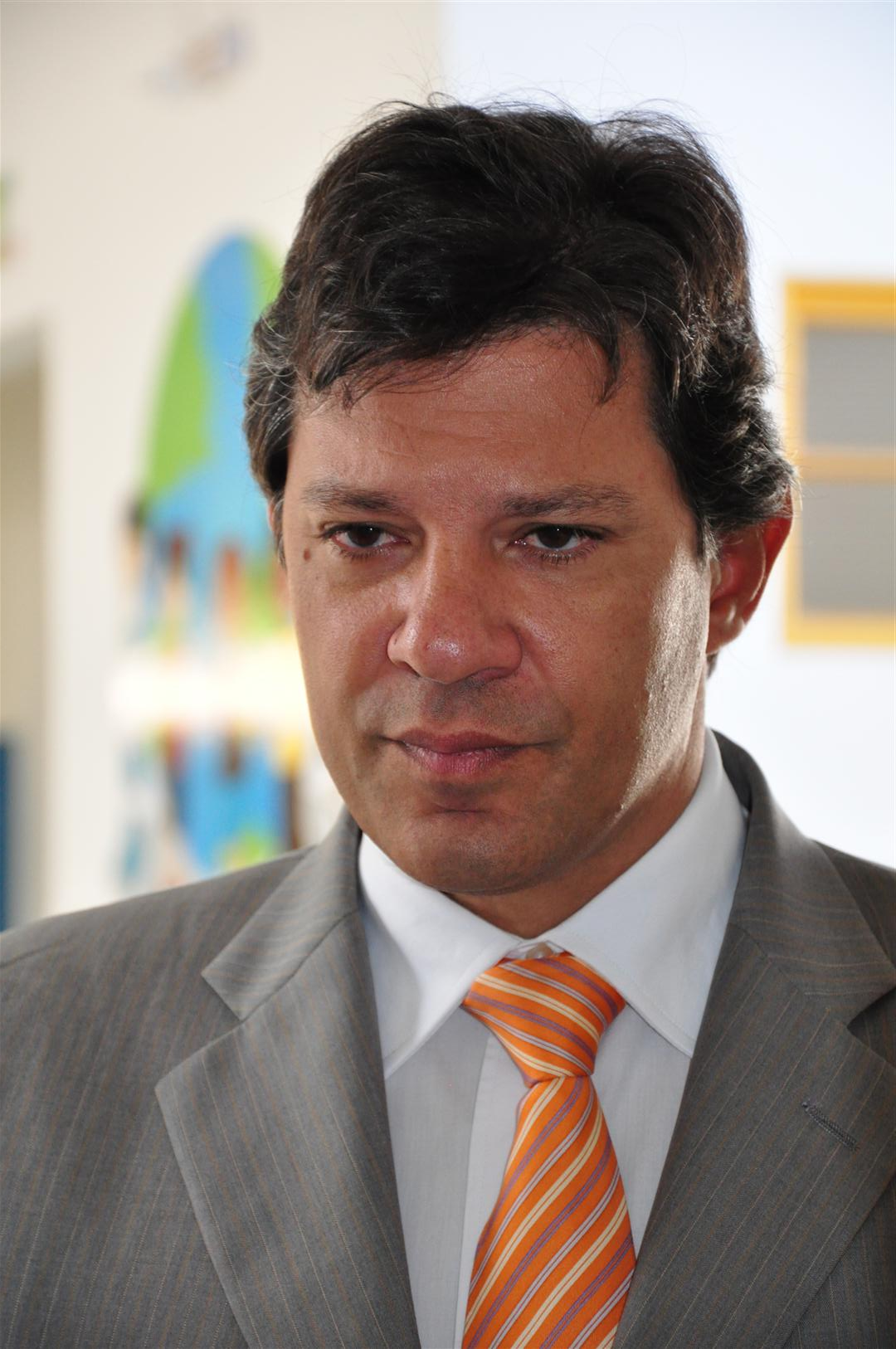
Fernando Haddad in 2011. During his term as minister, the PIBID and the SiSU were created, as well as the implementation of ProUni and the reformulation and expansion of FIES and the Enem.

The right to school transport was extended to more students, while in 2009 the National School Feeding Program (PNAE) was extended to high school students. In 2008, a minimum wage for teachers was established.

The government also created eleven federal public universities by September 2009, surpassing the mark of President Juscelino Kubitschek, and in January 2010 UNILA (Federal University of Latin-American Integration) was the thirteenth university created, with classes expected to begin in August 2010, with its first class of 200 students among Brazilians, Paraguayans, Uruguayans and Argentines. By August 2010, federal universities offered 113,000 free places and stated that investments had gone from 20 billion to 60 billion during the Lula administration, promising an increase in places to 250,000 by 2014. However, the program is criticized by professors and scholars at federal educational institutions. Some universities are said to be in a process of deterioration because of lack of federal funding transfers and the lack of university autonomy, an aspiration that was partially addressed in June 2010, near the end of the Lula administration, with the signing of Decree 7.233, which was expected to improve autonomy and resource management from 2011 onward, under the Dilma administration.

Investment in education during the Lula administration has been considered insufficient by specialists and sector organizations. In 2005, the percentage of spending on federal higher education in 2005 stagnated at 0.6% of GDP. However, the ideal is considered to be an investment between 8% and 12% of GDP, given Brazil's current educational deficit, something rarely seen in Brazilian history.

According to Roberto Leher, professor at the UFRJ Faculty of Education and coordinator of CLACSO's University and Society working group, in an article published in 2005 by Revista Adusp, the university under the Lula administration was a continuation of the agendas of the World Bank, the IDB and ECLAC, in such a way as to shape the public university into a market sector guided by neoliberal values, which would hardly deserve the concept of public.

Analyzing the measures implemented so far, it is possible to note that the policies of international organizations continue to guide the minds of Lula da Silva's government. Indeed, the modernization of the Ministry of Education fundamentally coincides with the agendas of the World Bank, the IDB and ECLAC for public higher education institutions: rationalization of access not through universal measures, but through quotas; teaching stimulus programs through productivity bonuses; standardized evaluation of "quality" (National Performance Examination) inspired by human capital theory; linking institutional development plans (established with business participation), evaluation (Sinaes) and financing (financing by means of contracts); directing the institution's "educational market" to the regional sphere, and a linear and close association between academic efficiency and university pragmatism. In short, the Bank disseminates an ideological position in order to shape the public university into a market sector guided by neoliberal values. The assimilation of these elements that make up the matrix of the World Bank's conception in the Draft Project designs an institution that would hardly deserve the concept of "public", making academic freedom unfeasible, conceived as an obstacle to institutional efficiency. In the balance of power between "academic" authority and the university-business authority, the latter prevails.

— Roberto Leher

At the end of the Lula administration, Brazil had repetition rates higher than all the countries used in the comparison, at 18.5%, although lower than the 1999 rates of 24%, and it also had low rates of completion of basic education, according to the report "Education for All Global Monitoring Report 2010", released by UNESCO (United Nations Educational, Scientific and Cultural Organization). Repetition in primary education in Brazil is still three times higher than the rate presented by Latin America (5.6%). The report states that Brazil is distant from fulfilling the goals on access and quality of education established by the organization. The country ranks 88th in a ranking of 128 countries. Among the four main goals established by UNESCO, Brazil performs well in literacy, access to primary education, and gender equality. The country ranks 88th in a ranking of 128 countries. But it performs poorly when one analyzes the percentage of students who manage to pass beyond the 5th year of primary school.

Despite the reforms made in 2009 to the National High School Exam, already in that year the government showed weaknesses in the security of the tests that would largely replace university entrance exams in various universities, with the occurrence of fraud that caused the postponement of the exams; in November 2010 new failures followed, causing the Federal Justice to suspend the exam; in both cases Enem became the subject of investigations by the Federal Police, and in 2010 the Ministry of Education even threatened to sue students who exposed the system's failures.

=== Environmental policy ===
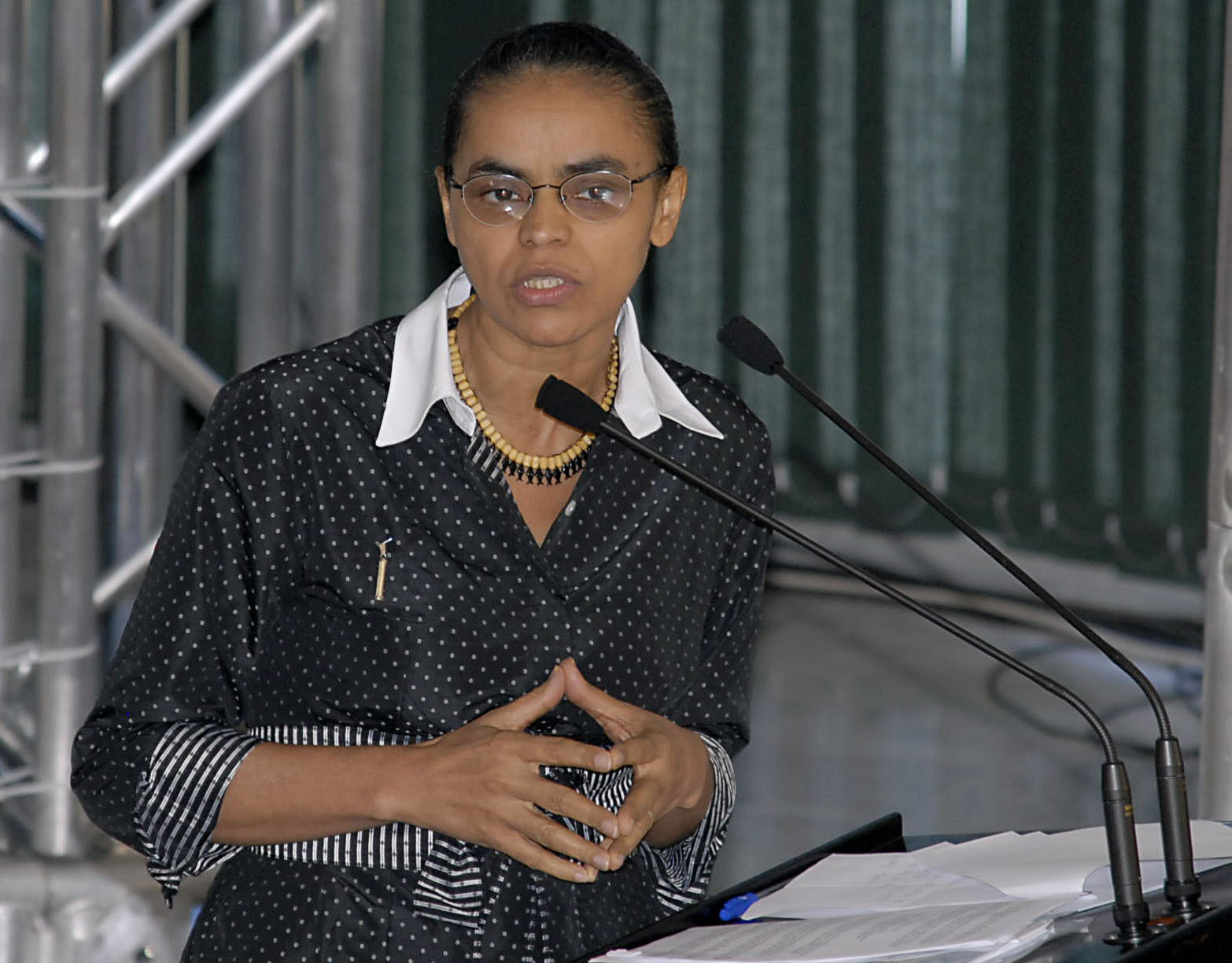
Marina Silva, then Minister of the Environment, speaks during the launch of the Sustainable Amazon Plan in 2008.

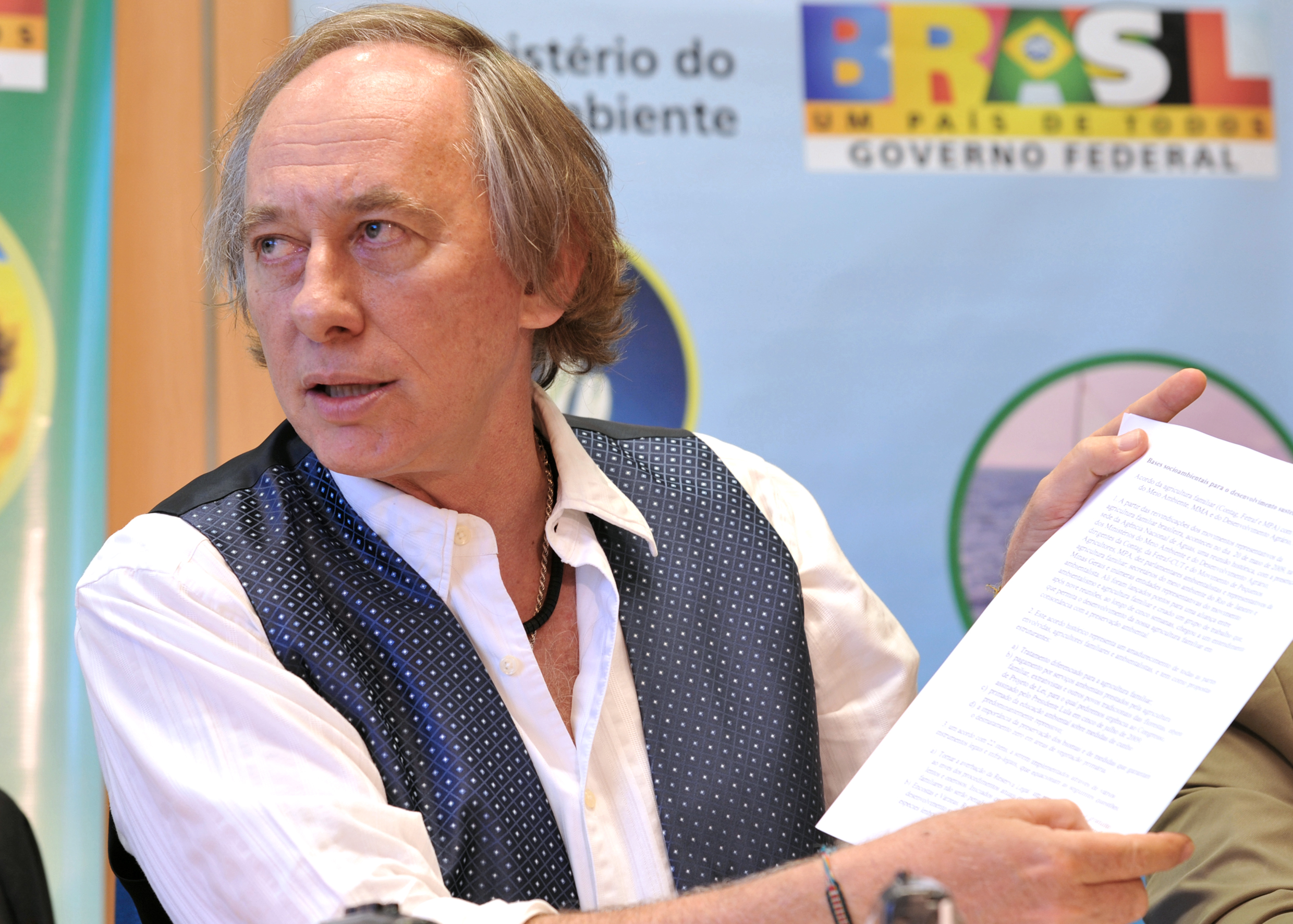
Carlos Minc in 2009, then Minister of the Environment in the Lula administration.

Marina Silva (PT-AC) remained in office until 2008 and left the Ministry of the Environment after facing opposition to her agenda within the government, resigning.

However, government actions such as monitoring deforested areas, rationalization of land use, creation of forest reserves and credit control for irregular producers caused the deforested area of the Amazon to be reduced in 2005, 2006 and 2007 to 11,633 square kilometers, the lowest deforestation since 1991. However, between August 2007 and July 2008, the deforested area increased again, reaching 12,911 square kilometers.

Between 2009 and 2010, the Amazon Institute of People and the Environment (Imazon) reported 6,451 km² deforested, with a forecast by the pattern of consolidated deforestation of 7,134 km² in the first year of Dilma's administration. Deforestation of the Atlantic Forest between 2002 and 2008 was 2.7 thousand km². In 1991, 11.1 thousand km² had been deforested, which had itself already been a victory for that government, which had reduced the average between 1978 and 1988 of 20.3 thousand km².

The Lula administration also approved the National Climate Change Policy with targets to reduce greenhouse gas emissions.

Current successes in reducing the deforestation of our forests give credibility to our willingness to reduce it by 80% by 2020. The Amazonian countries are working to define a common position on climate change. We want a protected but sovereign Amazon, under the control of the countries that make it up.

— Lula, in 2009

=== Culture ===
The creation of the EBC was authorized by Provisional Measure No. 398, of 10 October 2007, and the company was effectively created by Decree No. 6.246, of 24 October 2007. The Provisional Measure was later converted into Law No. 11.652, of 7 April 2008.

The state-owned company was created from the incorporation of the assets, personnel and broadcasting concessions of the Empresa Brasileira de Comunicação (Radiobrás) and the public assets of the Union that were under the custody of the Associação de Comunicação Educativa Roquette Pinto (Acerp). With the creation of EBC, a new management contract was made between the federal government, through EBC, and Acerp, and the latter became a service provider to EBC, which inherited Radiobrás's channel concessions.

Cultura Viva is a program of the Brazilian federal government, created in 2004 through an ordinance of the Ministry of Culture. Its flagship was the creation of the Pontos de Cultura, the program of the principal cultural policies of the Lula administration, and it is estimated to have reached 8 million Brazilians between 2004 and 2010.

=== Infrastructure ===
In January 2007, the PAC (Growth Acceleration Program) was launched, a set of measures aimed at accelerating the pace of growth of the Brazilian economy, with projected investments of more than 500 billion reais for the four years of the president's second term, in addition to a series of administrative and legislative changes.

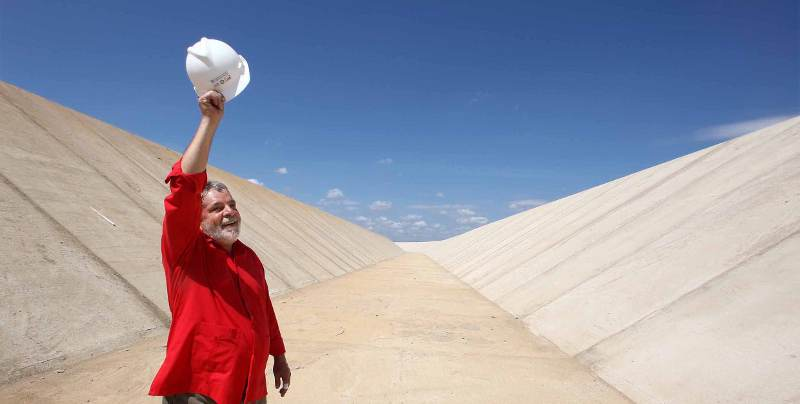
Lula visiting the São Francisco River transposition works in Cabrobó, Pernambuco, in 2009.

Even with the PAC, infrastructure investments were considered insufficient for Brazil's growth needs, according to analyses and calculations. According to data from economist Raul Velloso, calculated on the basis of the IBGE, the Union's direct investment rates were far from those recorded in the 1970s. According to Velloso, the Union's investment rate in 2009 reached 0.6% of Gross Domestic Product (GDP), not including state-owned enterprises, while in 1976, under the Geisel administration, Union investments were 1.9% of GDP, also excluding state-owned enterprises. Between 2003 and 2009, the Union's investment rate fluctuated between 0.2% – one of the lowest since 1970 – and 0.6%, the estimate for 2009. Economist José Roberto Afonso states that public investment increased in the final years of the Lula administration, especially in 2009, with greater execution of Growth Acceleration Program (PAC) works. He says, however, that the increase was insufficient to compensate for the loss in the private sector and also in relation to previous decades.

The PAC, however, had problems of execution (delays). President Lula himself cited the delay in the Transnordestina Railway. Although PAC balances projected, for example, road investments of R$ 45.5 billion over four years, in the last three the Annual Budget Laws (LOAs) had authorized only R$ 21.6 billion for the National Department of Transport Infrastructure (DNIT), which is equivalent to 47.6% of what had been projected. Only R$ 7.4 billion were actually paid. This amount represented 16.41% of the resources announced by the Union for construction, adaptation, duplication and recovery of road stretches throughout the country, and 34.58% of the resources authorized in the budget for the projects. According to data based on the website Contas Abertas, of the 12,520 PAC works throughout the country, just over 1,200 had been completed, or 9.8% of the total.

At the end of Lula's second term, one of the sectors that caused the most concern was civil aviation, mainly because of preparations for the 2014 World Cup. The sector's regulatory agency (ANAC) at that time had strategic positions vacant, which made it difficult to make important decisions. This deficiency in ANAC's management had existed since the crisis in the Brazilian aviation sector at the end of 2006, which became known as the "air blackout".

The Lula administration was responsible for the concession of about 2,600 kilometers of federal highways, which were auctioned on 9 October 2007. The winner of the auction to operate tolls on the highways for 25 years was the Spanish group OHL. There was also the privatization of 720 kilometers of the North-South Railway to Vale do Rio Doce for the amount of R$ 1.4 billion. Among other privatizations under the Lula administration are that of Santo Antônio Dam, Jirau Dam and the transmission line Porto Velho - Araraquara.

==== Security ====
Another serious situation was that of the Brazilian prison system. During the years 2002-2006, the prison population increased by about 67%. The situation reached the point that a CPI was established. In 2008, investigations showed prison overcrowding, lack of access of prisoners to education and work, and inhumane conditions in prisons. Over eight months, the CPI visited 60 facilities in 17 states and the Federal District. Deputy Domingos Dutra (PT-MA), rapporteur of the CPI, requested the indictment of about 40 authorities across the country and the holding accountable, in some way, of those responsible for the chaos in the prison system. According to the rapporteur, the estimated average cost of a prisoner in Brazil today is R$ 1,300 to R$ 1,600 per month. The creation of one place in the prison system costs R$ 22,000. "We are paying an absurd amount and the fault is neither of the prisoner, nor of the jailer, nor of Jesus Christ. The fault lies with the Brazilian authorities who have always treated prisoners with disregard, like human trash," said the rapporteur.

In 2007, the Lula administration, trying to bring improvements to the area, launched Pronasci (National Program of Public Security with Citizenship), whose goal is to help the states in the qualification and training of police forces. Only at the end of the eight years of the Lula administration did the National Council of Justice (CNJ) begin to analyze changes in the prison system and the Senate's Constitution and Justice Commission (CCJ) changes to the Code of Criminal Procedure, which, however, were criticized for the possibility of making the judiciary even slower than it already is.

==== Housing ====
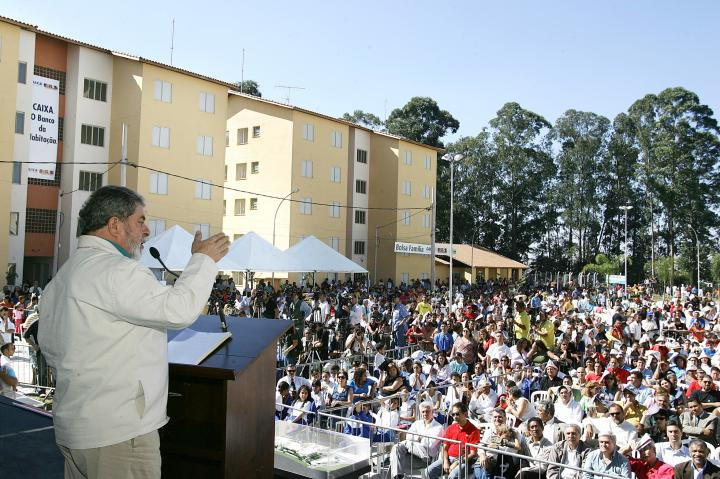
Lula speaking in Diadema, São Paulo, in 2005, during the delivery of a housing complex.

Brazil's housing deficit today reaches 7.2 million dwellings. Brazil's housing deficit is a serious current problem, of governmental responsibility, which has been leading to the growth of slums in Brazilian cities, especially in large metropolises, causing disruption and difficulties in varied areas such as security, health, urban organization and other aspects. The lack of cheap popular housing is one of the main reasons that lead the population to build slums in various areas. In 2009, it was estimated that São Paulo, the largest Brazilian city, alone had 1.3 million slum dwellers living in about 1,600 slums. To try to alleviate the problem, the Lula administration launched, in April 2009, already near the end of the eight-year term, the "Minha Casa, Minha Vida" plan. The program aims to build 1 million houses, reducing the country's housing deficit at the time by 14%.

==== Telecommunications ====
Started in 2003, the Computador para Todos Program had, in 2008, eighteen registered manufacturers to produce low-cost computers under an established law. This was one of the factors that helped some companies increase their production, from 250,000 units sold in 2005 to 2.8 million in 2009. Another factor to be considered in this growth was the greater ease of financing offered by retailers. This program is one of the facilitators of digital inclusion in the country. However, the country still has 104.7 million people without internet access, according to a 2009 IBGE survey. While in Brazil the percentage of people (10 years of age or older) with access to the network is 34.8%, in North America it reaches 74% and, in Europe, 52%. The number of people with computers in their homes has been growing and in 2009 reached 36%.

On 25 November 2009, Anatel announced the creation of a technical commission to study the possibilities of a caladão occurring, motivated by warnings made by the media that demand would become greater than supply. On the same day, Abrafix denied the possibility of this occurring. A meeting with technicians from mobile phone companies was scheduled for December, despite the control already exercised by the agency, which released the sale of new plans only after companies proved that there was sufficient network capacity for this.

Another problem in the sector is Anatel's own performance, which has been criticized. Many consumers only obtain solutions to their problems by appealing to Brasília, due to the omission of the agency, which is considered non-transparent and inefficient. According to the agency's ombudsman, Aristóteles dos Santos, "after ten years of existence, Anatel, by not fully fulfilling or enforcing the purposes that justified its creation, is, in our view, experiencing a relevant existential crisis". The ombudsman also accuses Anatel of omitting itself in problems of lack of competitiveness and lack of action to lower broadband internet prices. He says that "with low investments, the concessionaires dominate this other regional market practically without competition. They charge users high prices and elevated tariffs for accesses operated at limited speeds". Aristóteles also points out in his report the lack of a plan for rural telephony, saying that Anatel cannot avoid this discussion.

Lula launched in 2008 a program called Banda Larga nas Escolas to expand access to high-speed internet in public schools.

Telebras was officially reactivated to manage the National Broadband Plan in 2010 during the administration of Luiz Inácio Lula da Silva.

== Foreign affairs ==
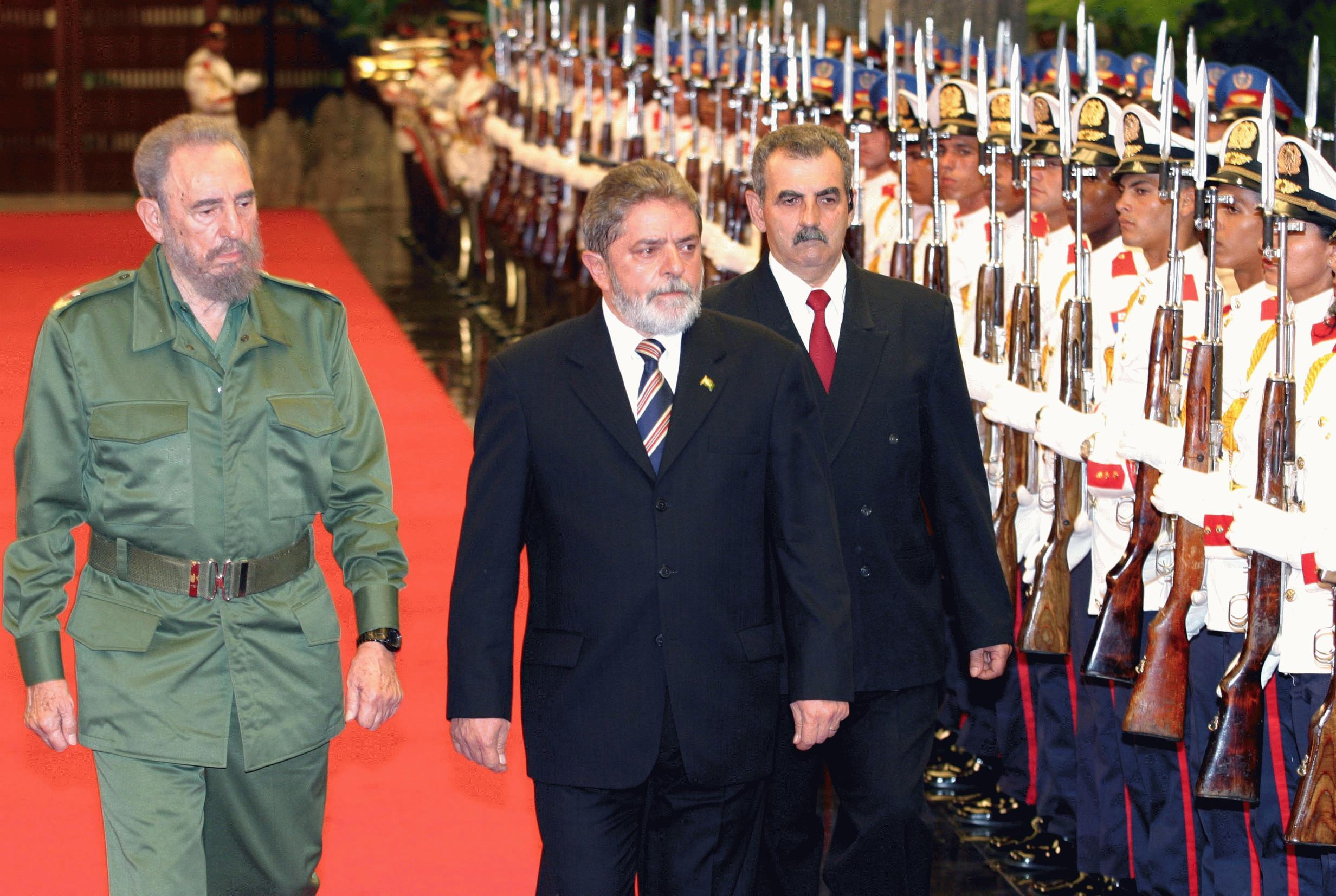
Lula and Cuban leader Fidel Castro, 2003

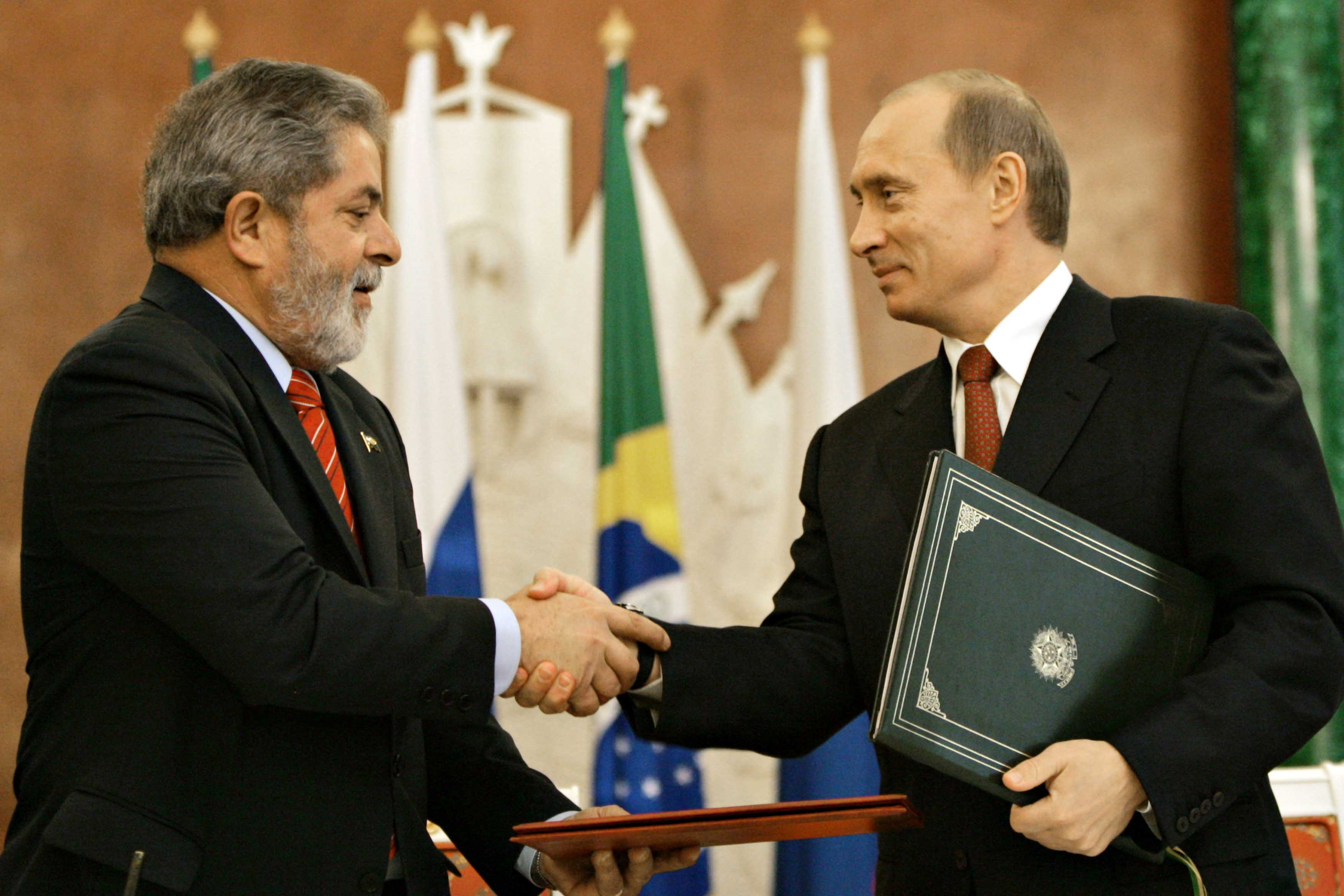
Lula with President of Russia Vladimir Putin, 2005

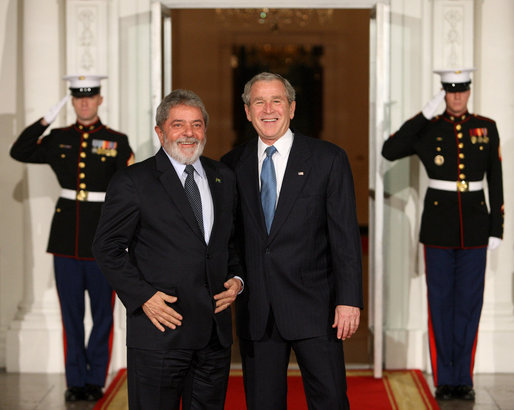
Lula with U.S. president George W. Bush, 2008

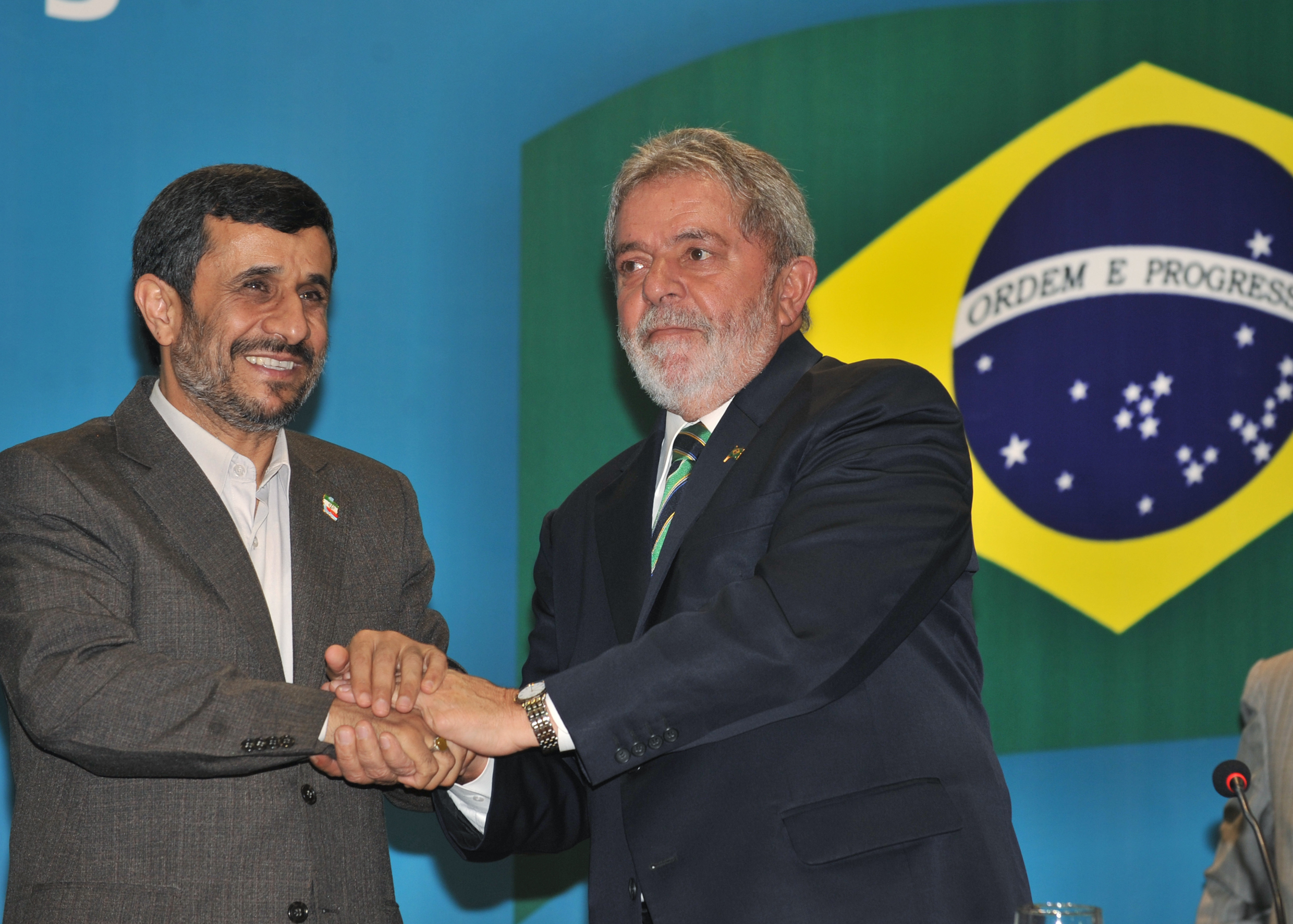
Lula with Iranian president Ahmadinejad, 2009

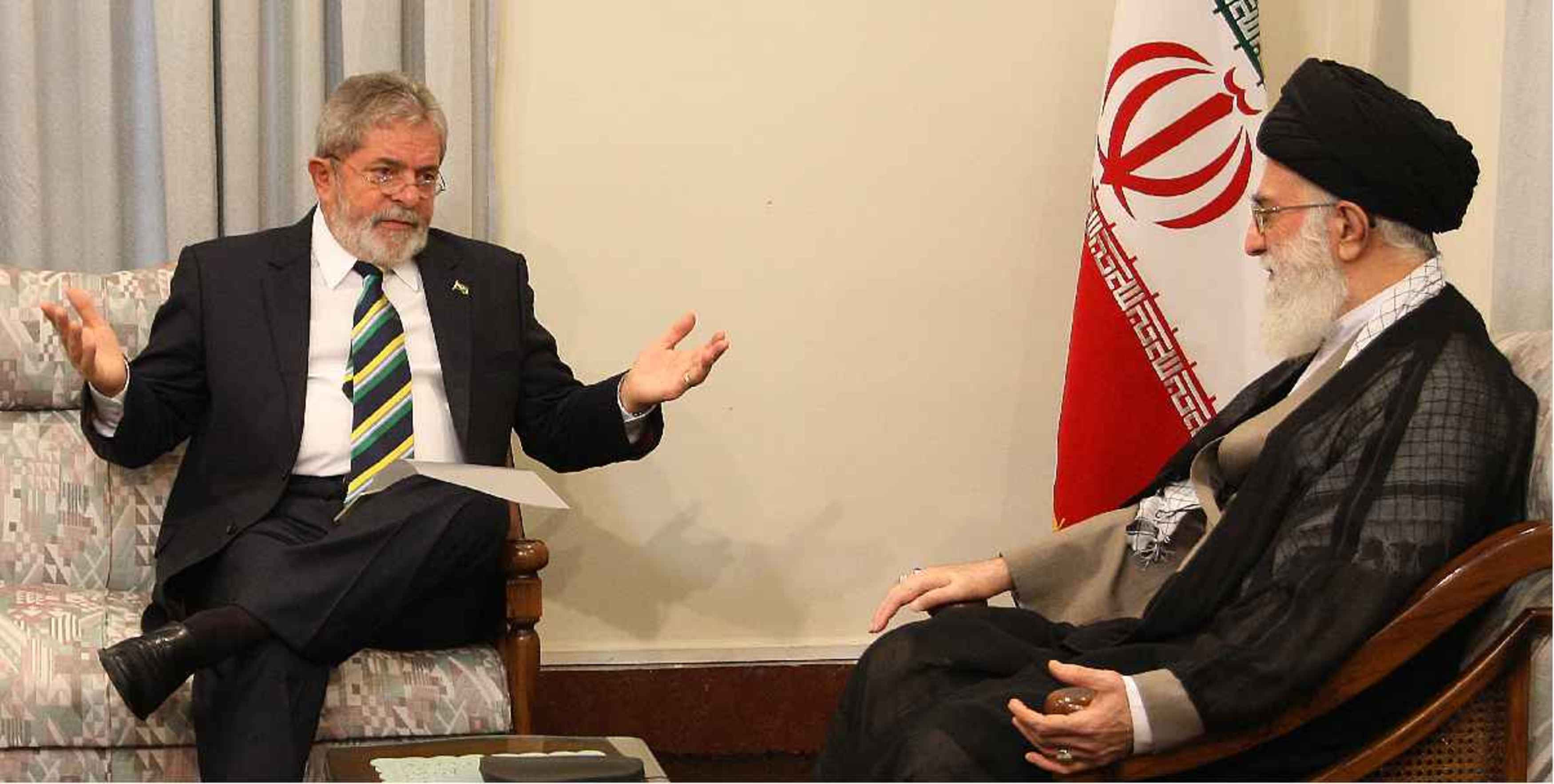
Lula meeting with Supreme leader of Iran Ali Khamenei, 2010

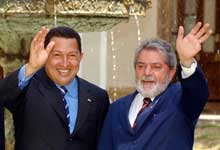
Lula and Venezuelan president Hugo Chávez, 2005

In 1979, Lula was asked in an interview which historical figures he admired most. He answered: Gandhi, Che Guevara, and Mao Zedong. Upon being asked to give additional examples, he added Hitler, Castro, and Ayatollah Khomeini, saying: "I admire in a man the fire to want to do something, and then his going out to try to do it".

Leading a large agricultural state, Lula generally opposed and criticized farm subsidies, and this position has been seen as one of the reasons for the walkout of developing nations and subsequent collapse of the Cancún World Trade Organization talks in 2003 over G8 agricultural subsidies. Brazil played a role in negotiations regarding internal conflicts in Venezuela and Colombia, and made efforts to strengthen Mercosur. During the Lula administration, Brazilian foreign trade increased dramatically, changing from deficits to several surpluses after 2003. In 2004, the surplus was US$29 billion, due to a substantial increase in global demand for commodities. Brazil also provided UN peace-keeping troops and led a peace-keeping mission in Haiti.

In 2005, Lula was the subject when the Brazilian electrician, Jean Charles de Menezes, aged 27 was shot dead by police onboard a tube in Stockwell tube station, a day after the failed 21 July 2005 London bombings.

According to The Economist of 2 March 2006, Lula had a pragmatic foreign policy, seeing himself as a negotiator, not an ideologue, a leader adept at reconciling opposites. As a result, he befriended both Venezuelan president Hugo Chávez and U.S. President George W. Bush. Former Finance Minister, and current advisor, Delfim Netto, said: "Lula is the ultimate pragmatist".

He travelled to more than 80 countries during his presidency. A goal of Lula's foreign policy was for the country to gain a seat as a permanent member of the United Nations Security Council. In this he was unsuccessful.

=== South America and BRICS ===
One of the major achievements of the Lula government was the integration of South America through the expansion of Mercosur.

Mercosur represented the first South American integration process, and also the first in Latin America, to obtain concrete results and to open regional alternatives for a better international insertion of the countries of the Southern Cone, within the framework of an emerging world order.

— Paulo G. Fagundes Vizentini

The Lula government promoted the opening of new trade routes with countries with which Brazil had little relationship: the People's Republic of China, India, Russia and South Africa, among others, as well as an association between Mercosur and the European Union and the strengthening of international organizations (especially the UN).

In practical terms, the Brazilian government surpassed a certain previous passivity and sought alliances outside the hemisphere as a way of expanding its power of influence internationally through the aforementioned active and pragmatic posture. As the main priority of the agenda, one perceives the reconstruction of Mercosur and South American integration, creating a space for Brazilian leadership. In addition, solidarity with Africa is also central, as it associates ethical principles and national interest. The intention to deepen relations (and establish a "strategic partnership") with emerging powers such as China, India, Russia and South Africa, among others, together with the establishment of an association between Mercosur and the European Union and the strengthening of international organizations (especially the UN), alongside the economic advantages they provide, signal the intention to contribute to the establishment of a multipolar international system. The principle of democratizing international relations was explicitly invoked.

— Paulo G. Fagundes Vizentini

However, the Lula government made controversial decisions in foreign policy. One of them was the expansion of the diplomatic network on the African continent. There was also the recognition of China as a market economy, which removed several trade barriers imposed on Chinese products, facilitating their entry into the Brazilian market, and since the trade balance favored imports of Chinese products, some sectors of national production would suffer losses, since Chinese products reached the Brazilian market much more cheaply, and this trend continued until the Dilma government. However, the move did not achieve the desired effect, which was support from China for a seat on the United Nations Security Council since Japan, which was supported by the United States, also wanted a permanent seat, which would be unacceptable to the Chinese.

The Lula government also accumulated some defeats in its attempts to create an economic bloc composed of developing and emerging countries. The Lula government sponsored a peace mission in Haiti, seeking credit with the UN. Around 1,200 Brazilian soldiers landed in Haiti in a peace mission aimed at restructuring the Haitian state.

=== Mission in Haiti ===
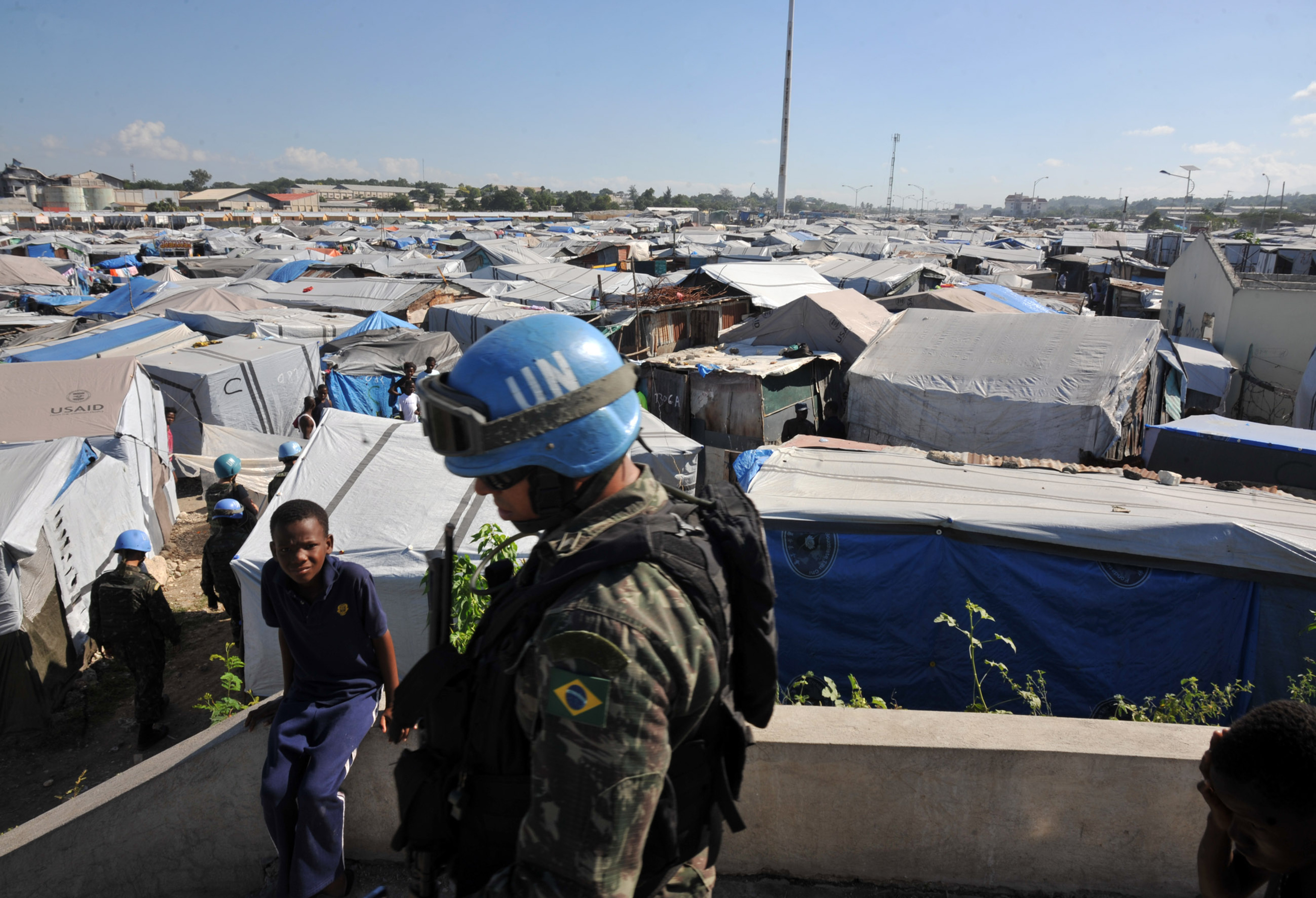
Brazilian soldier patrols the Jean Marie Vincent camp in Port-au-Prince, Haiti.

Regarding the occupation in Haiti, the trade union organization Batay Ouvriye (Workers’ Struggle) denounces that the occupying forces served to repress workers who protested against multinational companies that had settled in the country. According to union leader Didier Dominique, he considers that the intervention in Haiti will go down in history as a stain on the biographies of rulers elected with the support of popular movements, such as President Lula:

"They are competing to install factories in a free-trade zone, in order to take advantage of the cheapest labor in the Americas (...) when the people rebelled against hunger, seven people died and several were injured as a result of military repression."

—

The Brazilian government also donated 172 million United States dollars to Haiti to rebuild the country after the 2010 Haiti earthquake that devastated the nation.

=== Trade and political disputes ===
In 2010, the Lula government obtained victory in the case concerning subsidies for cotton producers in the United States. The World Trade Organization granted Brazil the right to retaliate with import taxes on various American products due to Washington’s spending to finance cotton production, which harmed the sector in Brazil. Nevertheless, Brazil allowed further negotiations with the United States in order to end the dispute.

The Lula government also accumulated some defeats in the international arena: after investing US$3.5 billion in Bolivia, Petrobras had its plants nationalized by Evo Morales, without an adequate diplomatic response. Brazil also conceded to Paraguay when the newly elected president Fernando Lugo decided no longer to comply with the contract signed with Brazil regarding electricity from Itaipu. As a result, Brazil tripled the amount it pays its neighbor for the electricity with which Paraguay supplies the southeastern region of Brazil. The new agreement of September 2009 adjusted the payment from US$120 million to US$360 million. The agreement also allows Paraguay to sell energy to the Brazilian market without mediation by the state company Eletrobras.

=== Cuba ===
Lula and Cuban president Fidel Castro were longtime friends. Under Lula, Brazil provided money and corporate support to Cuba. The state-controlled Brazilian oil company Petrobras studied the possibility of drilling for oil off of Cuba, while the Odebrecht construction firm headed a revamp of the Cuban port of Mariel into the island's main commercial port. Brazil's state-run Brazilian Development Bank gave $300 million to Odebrecht to build new roads, rail lines, wharves, and warehouses at Mariel. Brazil also offered Cuba up to $1 billion in credit lines to pay for Brazilian goods and services.

=== Iran ===
In 2009, Lula warmly hosted Iranian president Ahmadinejad, who made a controversial visit to Iran. Some demonstrators expressed displeasure over Ahmadinejad's positions on human rights and his denial of the Holocaust.

In May 2010, Lula and Turkey's prime minister Recep Tayyip Erdoğan negotiated a preliminary fuel swap agreement with the Iranian government on uranium enrichment, that ultimately failed. The preliminary agreement that they presented to the United Nations was at odds with what the International Atomic Energy Agency and other countries viewed as necessary actions to stop Iran from obtaining weapons grade materials. And within hours of signing the agreement, Iran did an about-face and announced that it would continue to enrich some uranium. The UN Security Council ultimately rejected it when permanent member country representatives argued that "the swap proposal negotiated by Brazil and Turkey would leave Iran with enough material to make a nuclear weapon", and that “Iran intends to continue a new programme of enriching uranium to a higher level". Moisés Naím, editor in chief of Foreign Policy magazine and former Minister of Trade in Venezuela, said "Lula is a political giant, but morally he has been a deep disappointment". In 2010, in addition, Brazilians largely disagreed with Lula as to how to handle Iran and Iran's nuclear weapons programme. While Lula opposed additional international economic sanctions against Iran, of the 85% of Brazilians who opposed Iran acquiring nuclear weapons, two-thirds approved of tighter international sanctions on Iran to try to prevent it from developing nuclear weapons.

== Popularity ==
Lula ended his government with the highest approval rating in history. In the final months of his administration, his popularity reached its peak. 83% of respondents rated the administration as great or good, compared to 13% who considered it regular and 4% bad or terrible, according to Datafolha. A few months earlier, in July 2010, according to another Datafolha survey, Lula's popularity reached its best value since 2003, also being the best popularity among all presidents surveyed since 1990. 78% of those surveyed rated the government as great or good.

Under the influence of the impact of the global financial crisis, which brought an increase in unemployment in the country in the first two months of 2009, approval of the Lula government, which in December 2008 had set a new record, reaching, according to the Datafolha survey, the mark of 70% evaluation of "great" or "good", fell in March 2009 to 65%. It was the first reduction observed in the president's second term.

The drop in the positive evaluation was quite brief, since, already in the month of May 2009, surveys again showed growth in government approval, also as a consequence of Brazil's stability in the face of the international economic crisis. In the Datafolha survey published on 31 May of the same year, the positive evaluation returned to the November level, when the government's approval rating reached the record of 70%.

== Controversies ==
From 2004 onward, the Lula government faced political crises, in what became known as the Bingo scandal. In it, Waldomiro Diniz, an aide to José Dirceu, appears in the release of a tape recorded by businessman and illegal lottery operator Carlos Augusto Ramos, known as Carlinhos Cachoeira, extorting the gambling operator in order to raise funds for the electoral campaign of the Workers' Party and the Brazilian Socialist Party in Rio de Janeiro. In return, Waldomiro promised to help Augusto Ramos in a public bidding process. The Public Prosecutor's Office presented a complaint accepted by the Federal Court for criminal conduct in negotiations for the renewal of the contract between Caixa Econômica Federal in 2003. Initially, 15 million reais were demanded by a "consultancy", which was settled at 6 million reais.

In 2005, an aide to Ceará State Deputy José Nobre Guimarães, brother of then Federal Deputy José Genoíno, was arrested with 440 thousand reais in his underwear. Guimarães denied any connection to the money, but admitted that he received R$ 250 thousand, not officially declared to the Electoral Court, to be spent on Cirilo's campaign (a mayoral candidate in Ceará). The PT National Directory officially denied the transfer. The Assembly's Ethics Council recommended the revocation of Guimarães's mandate; however, Guimarães, PT leader in Ceará, remained in office by 23 votes to 16.

There were corruption scandals, such as the Mensalão, and other less relevant ones, such as, for example, the Palocci resignation scandal, in the first term, and the corporate card scandal, in the second.

=== Mensalão scandal ===
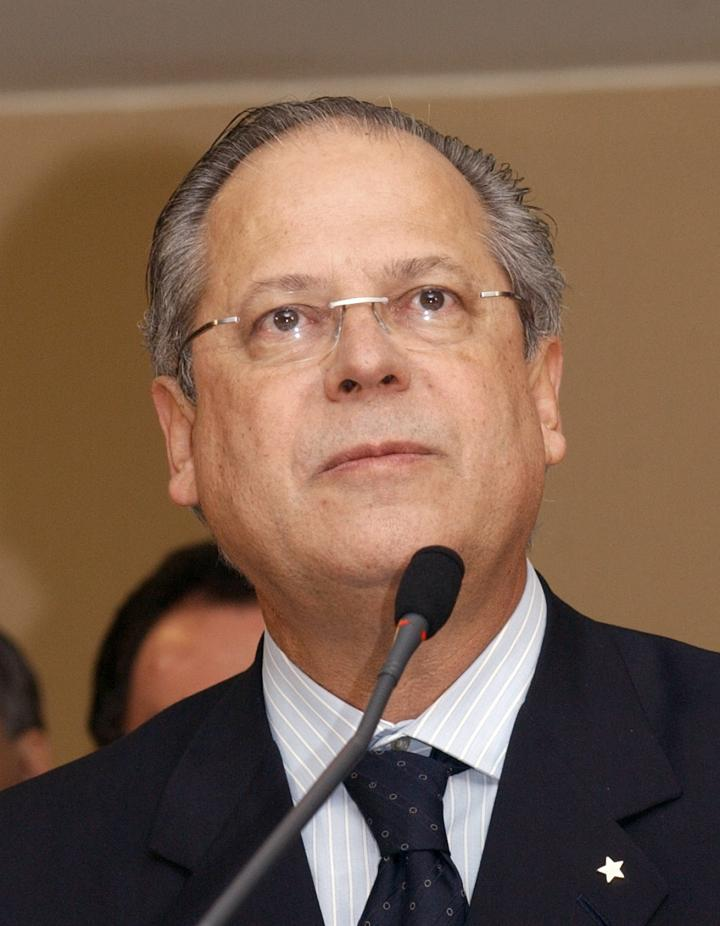
José Dirceu was the Chief of Staff in Lula's government. He was removed after Roberto Jefferson accused him of being the coordinator of an illegal scheme of monthly payments to congressmen. In 2012, he was sentenced to 10 years and 10 months in prison.

The political crises reached their peak in July 2005 when the scheme of buying votes from deputies in Congress and financing campaigns through "slush funds" was denounced. Known as the "Mensalão scandal", it was the most critical moment of Luiz Inácio Lula da Silva's administration and considered the worst scandal of his government, resulting in the revocation of the mandate of José Dirceu in December 2005, holder of the main political coordination post in the country at that moment, being treated by the press as the true strongman of the federal administration, who would be responsible for decisions. And the developments of the investigations extended until 2008 in Operation Satiagraha.

In 2011, after the end of President Lula's two terms, a cover story in Época magazine reported that a final report by the Federal Police confirmed the existence of the Mensalão. The 332-page document was the most important piece produced by the federal government to investigate the scheme of diversion of public money and its use to buy political support in Congress during the Lula government. Época's report was contested a week later by CartaCapital, which highlighted that there was not "a single line in the Federal Police text" confirming the existence of the scheme of monthly payments to pro-government parliamentarians in exchange for support for government projects in the National Congress.

In February 2011, the Federal Public Prosecutor's Office filed an action against former president Lula for administrative misconduct. The accusation is that he and former Minister of Social Security Amir Francisco Lando used the public machine for personal promotion and in order to favor Banco BMG. The alleged irregularities occurred between October and December 2004.

=== Aviation crisis ===
The Brazil aviation crisis or "air blackout", as reported by the press in 2006, was a series of collapses in air transport that were triggered after the crash of Gol Transportes Aéreos Flight 1907 on 29 September 2006. Blackout is a name adopted in Brazil to refer to serious structural failures in some sector. For more than a year, the situation in passenger air transport in Brazil went through difficulties, even causing the fall of Lula government Defense Minister Waldir Pires.

=== Corporate card scandal ===
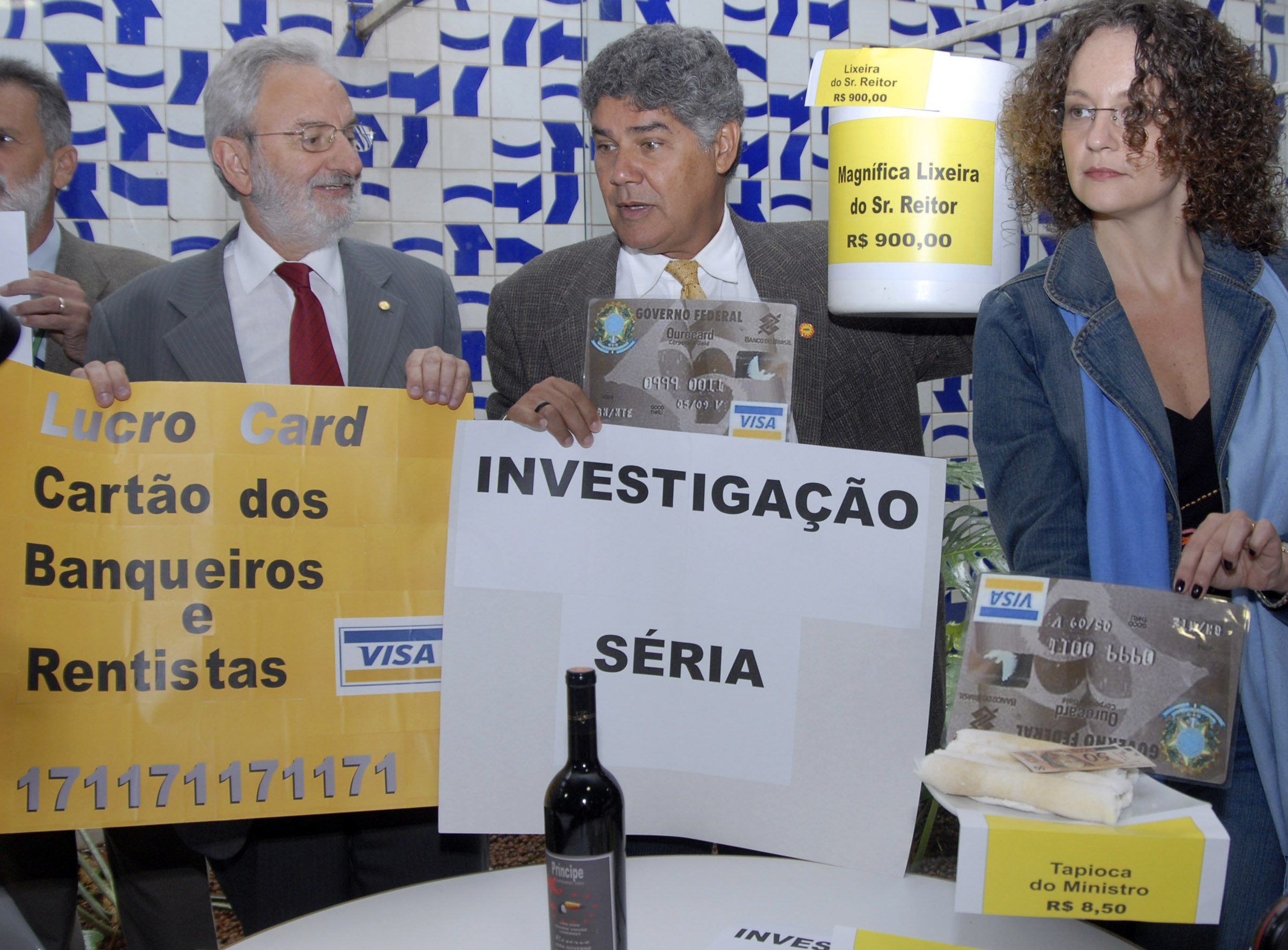
Deputies from PSOL call for an investigation into the so-called "corporate card scandal".

At the beginning of 2008, a new crisis began: the corporate card use crisis. The allegations led to the resignation of the Minister for the Promotion of Racial Equality, Matilde Ribeiro, who had the highest spending on the card in 2007. Sports Minister Orlando Silva returned more than R$ 30 thousand to the public treasury, avoiding resignation. The allegation that led Congress to request the opening of a CPI was the use of a corporate card by a security guard for Lula's daughter, Lurian Cordeiro Lula da Silva, spending R$ 55 thousand between April and December 2007. Fernando Henrique Cardoso criticized "the proposal by government supporters to begin the investigations from the spending made during his administration", claiming that this was a political game. "The accusation that exists is in the current government", and he criticized "cash withdrawals made with the corporate card". The investigation, however, covered the period of the government of then-president Fernando Henrique Cardoso as well.

The press revealed that the Planalto Palace compiled a dossier detailing spending by FHC's family and that the documents were being used to intimidate the opposition in the CPI, but the Chief of Staff's Office denied the existence of the dossier. Months later, under criticism from the opposition, the Corporate Card CPI cleared all Lula government ministers accused of irregularities in the use of cards and did not mention the compilation of the dossier on former president FHC's spending.

=== Erenice Guerra case ===
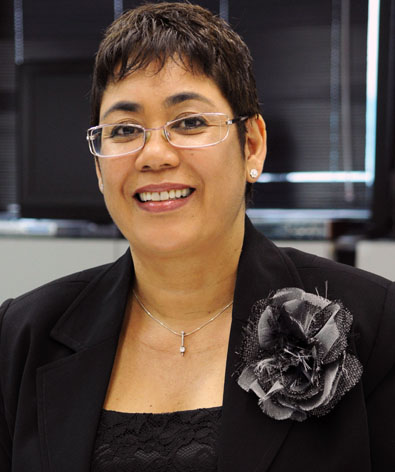
Erenice Guerra.

In September 2010, in the middle of the election period and based on the testimony of Fábio Baracat, a businessman in the transportation sector, Veja magazine accused Israel Guerra, son of then-Chief of Staff Erenice Guerra, of participating in an influence-peddling scheme, in which he would charge a 6% bribe to facilitate, through his intermediation, business with the government. According to a report by the Office of the Comptroller General, his sister Maria Euriza Carvalho, when she was legal adviser to EPE, hired, without bidding, a law firm whose partner was the minister's other brother, Antonio Alves de Carvalho. This fact was published by the newspaper O Estado de S. Paulo and by Veja magazine under the title Erenice Guerra family scheme also operates in the Ministry of Mines and Energy.

The partner responsible for the firm, Márcio Luiz Silva, was part of the legal coordination of the campaign of Dilma Rousseff, the PT candidate for the presidency, who won the election in October 2010.

Because of the accusations, Erenice made her tax, bank and telephone secrecy, as well as that of members of her family, available for consultation. Baracat himself, however, published a clarifying note denying the magazine's accusations.

Erenice rebutted the magazine's accusations through an official statement on presidential letterhead in which she accused José Serra, Dilma Rousseff's opponent in the 2010 presidential election, of being responsible for the accusations. In the aggressive official note, Erenice called José Serra "an unethical and already defeated candidate".

=== Diplomatic passports ===
Lula requested diplomatic passports for his children during the final days of his term, "on an exceptional basis" and "in the country's interest". Lula's children could receive the document if they were dependents up to the age of 21, which was not the case for Lula's children, who were 25 and 39 years old when they obtained them. Despite the apparent violation of Decree 5.978/2006, which regulates the issuance of diplomatic passports, the passports were not returned and the Foreign Minister alleges that he can grant the benefit on an "exceptional basis".

=== Relationship with the press ===
In May 2004, after the publication of the article Brazilian Leader's Tippling Becomes National Concern, which speculated about Lula's links to alcoholic beverages and international gaffes, by journalist Larry Rohter, Brazil correspondent for The New York Times from 1999 to 2007, Lula ordered the Ministry of Justice to cancel the journalist's residence visa, which would result in his expulsion from the country. At the time, the Planalto declared that the text was not journalistic and that it was "slander, defamation and prejudice". The order was halted by a decision of Peçanha Martins, minister of the Superior Court of Justice, in a habeas corpus petition filed by then-Senator Sérgio Cabral. The expulsion reverberated in the international press, where many foreign newspapers criticized the government's decision. The Associação Brasileira de Jornalismo Investigativo (Abraji) published a note of repudiation, stating that the government's attitude was a "serious attack on freedom of the press and expression". Five years after the publication of the article, lawyers for the American newspaper submitted a letter requesting that the Planalto reconsider Larry Rohter's visa. The request was granted by the government.

There were also episodes of persecution and aggression against journalists by party militants and security guards.

== See also ==
- Second presidency of Lula da Silva
- Lulism
- Politics of Brazil
- Workers' Party (Brazil)
- List of scandals in Brazil
