= Letter to the Brazilian people =

2002 letter by Luiz Inácio Lula da Silva

The Letter to the Brazilian people (Carta ao povo brasileiro) was a text authored in June 2002 by Luiz Inácio Lula da Silva, then running for president of Brazil, in which he assured that, in case of victory, his party, the Workers' Party (PT in the Portuguese acronym), would respect the national and international deals. The letter was read on 22 June 2002 during a gathering about the party's government program.

The document was interpreted as an important conciliating milestone of Lula's campaign, in that it was received as indicating that the party would act in support of the economic/financial sector. Such support would be unprecedented in the history of PT and was met with criticism, for example, from the Landless Workers' Movement, which responded still in 2002 with another document, titled "Letter to the Brazilian people and President Lula" urging PT and Lula to act towards radical social change in Brazil, pointing at the election of a PT candidate as a historical opportunity.

Economist Luiz Gonzaga Belluzzo saw the letter as a milestone and indicative that Lula would continue the government of his predecessor Fernando Henrique Cardoso. Political scientist André Singer saw it as the main indicator that Lula would adopt policies for the benefit of financial capital and have it as a guideline of his government. Journalist Celso Rocha de Barros commented that the letter both helped Antonio Palocci garner approval for his positions within the party and set an outline for his tenure as minister of Finance, even when both the market and the party's left struggled to believe in him. In this sense, for Barros, the orthodox style adopted by Lula in the first years of his presidency would not fall into policy switch territory.
