= Antonio Palocci =

Brazilian physician and politician

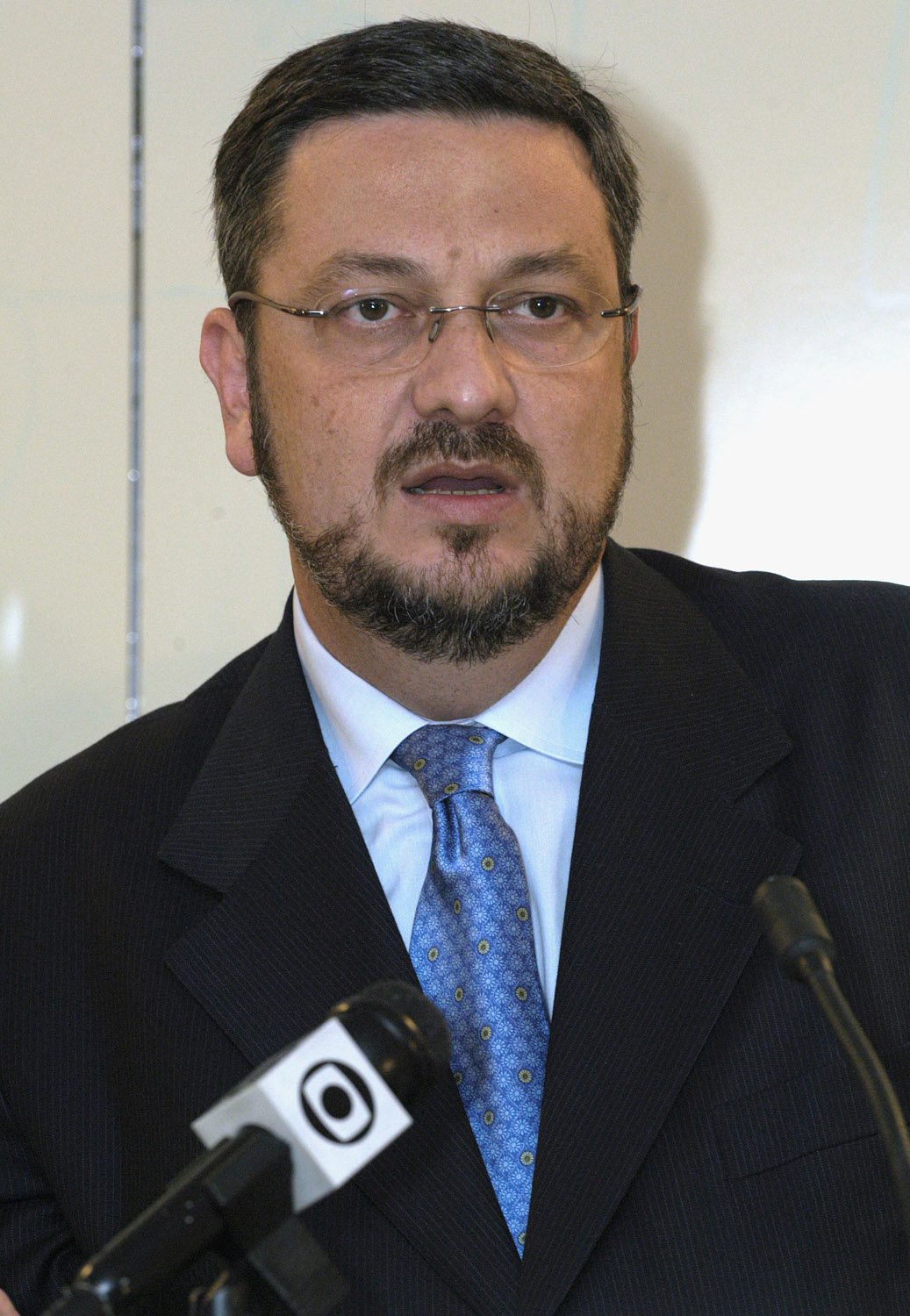

Chief of Staff of the Presidency
- In office 1 January 2011 – 7 June 2011
- President: Dilma Rousseff
- Preceded by: Erenice Guerra
- Succeeded by: Gleisi Hoffmann

Member of the Chamber of Deputies
- In office 1 February 2007 – 1 January 2011
- Constituency: São Paulo
- In office 1 February 1999 – 27 December 2000
- Constituency: São Paulo

Minister of Finance
- In office 1 January 2003 – 27 March 2006
- President: Luiz Inácio Lula da Silva
- Preceded by: Pedro Malan
- Succeeded by: Guido Mantega

Mayor of Ribeirão Preto
- In office 1 January 2001 – 31 March 2002
- Vice Mayor: Gilberto Maggioni
- Preceded by: Luiz Roberto Jábali
- Succeeded by: Gilberto Maggioni
- In office 1 January 1993 – 31 March 1996
- Vice Mayor: Luiz Roberto Jábali
- Preceded by: Welson Gasparini
- Succeeded by: Luiz Roberto Jábali

State Deputy of São Paulo
- In office 1 February 1991 – 1 January 1993
- Constituency: At-large

Councillor of Ribeirão Preto
- In office 1 January 1989 – 31 January 1991
- Constituency: At-large

Personal details
- Born: Antonio Palocci Filho; 4 October 1960 (age 66) Cosmorama, São Paulo, Brazil
- Party: PT (1981–2017)
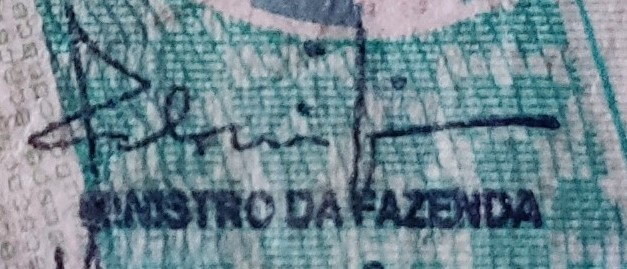
- Signature
- Criminal information
- Status: On parole
- Motive: Breach of bank secrecy (2008); Passive corruption and money laundering (2016)
- Convictions: Passive corruption and money laundering (26 June 2017)
- Penalty: 12 years, 2 months, 20 days

Antonio Palocci Filho (born 4 October 1960) is a Brazilian physician and politician, and formerly Chief of Staff of Brazil under President Dilma Rousseff. He was the finance minister of the Brazilian federal government from 1 January 2003 to 27 March 2006, when he resigned in the wake of reports of conduct unbecoming of his office during the presidency of Luiz Inácio Lula da Silva. He resigned as chief of staff on 7 June 2011.

== Early life and career ==
Palocci was raised in Ribeirão Preto, in the state of São Paulo. His father was an artist and teacher. During his youth as a medical student at the University of São Paulo’s Ribeirão Preto Medical School, Palocci took part in several radical movements. He was one of the founders of the Workers' Party and was its president in São Paulo from 1997 to 1998.

After graduation, Palocci worked for five years as a civil servant at the Ribeirão Preto regional office of the São Paulo State Public Health Secretariat. He implemented the Workers’ Health Ward and was the director of the regional office of the public health service.

When Palocci was 28 years old, after occupying positions in various labour unions, including the CUT (linked to the Workers Party) he ran for election as a city councilman (vereador) for the first time. Since then, Palocci has never lost an election. However, he completed only one of his terms (as mayor of Ribeirão Preto, from 1993 to 1996.

== Political career ==
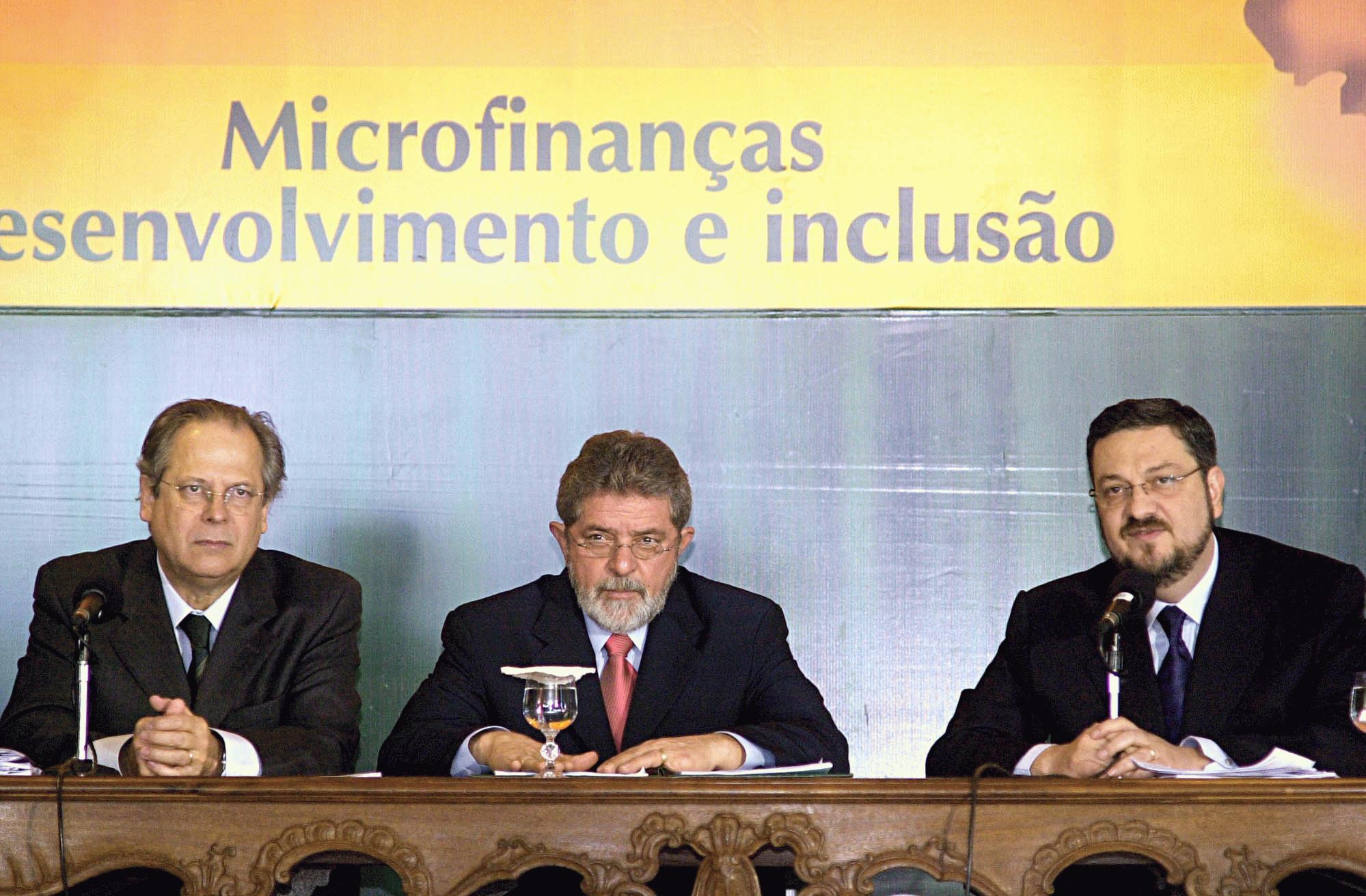
Chief of staff José Dirceu, president Lula, and finance minister Antonio Palocci, 2003

Palocci was elected councilman in Ribeirão Preto in 1988. He did not finish his term but stepped down to for the office of state deputy and won. In 1992, he resigned his term as deputy to become mayor of Ribeirão Preto, after winning the local election. It is during his administrations as mayor that Palocci is alleged to have led a major slush fund operation (see below) for the Workers' Party, a scheme denounced by a former secretary, Rogério Buratti.

In 1995, he received the UNICEF’s Child and Peace prize for his work for the rights of infants and adolescents. In 1996, he received the Juscelino Kubitschek Award from SEBRAE-SP, the São Paulo chapter of the Serviço Brasileiro de Apoio às Micro e Pequenas Empresas (Brazilian Service for Assistance to Small Businesses), for being the mayor of the city in São Paulo state who offered the best support to small business. In 2002, he received the Mário Covas Award from SEBRAE again for his work on behalf of local small businesses.

Palocci was elected federal deputy in 1998. In 2000, he resigned his office so that he could run again in the mayoral election in Ribeirão Preto. He won the election, and was again mayor of Ribeirão Preto from 2001 to 2002. He resigned in 2002 to work on Luiz Inácio Lula da Silva's campaign for the Brazilian presidency. In 2003, when Lula was elected, Palocci officially resigned as the mayor of Ribeirão Preto, was nominated the Finance Minister of Brazil and became a key figure in the new government.

Along with former minister José Dirceu (who resigned and subsequently lost his political rights due to involvement with the Mensalão scandal), Palocci was considered one of the most influential and strong ministers of Lula’s government.

On 1 January 2011, President Dilma Rousseff appointed him chief of staff. He resigned in July 2011.

== Corruption crimes and other criminal charges ==
Antonio Palocci is involved in crimes related to the Mensalão scandal. He is currently sentenced to years in jail under the Car Wash federal operation.other Investigations are still underway .

== Ministerial abuse of power ==
A new scandal began to unfold in 2006 after a parliamentary inquiry heard testimony from two witnesses who claimed that the minister might have visited a manor house in Brasília suspected of functioning as a hub for fraudulent operations within the government, with the participation of some of his closest aides. Palocci had previously claimed that he had never been to that house.

The main witness in the case was Francenildo Costa, the groundskeeper of the property. He believed the minister had visited the house "on at least ten occasions" and said he recognized Palocci as the man he had seen in the meetings of governmental officials at the house.

A few days after Costa's deposition, his bank statement (from government-run Caixa Econômica Federal) was leaked to the press. It indicated that the groundskeeper had a balance of R$38,860 (about US$18,000.00), which would be incompatible with his income. Congressmen argued that this questionable balance implies bribery potential for contradicting the minister, apparently in an attempt to tarnish the minister's credibility as a witness. The groundskeeper justified the figures by claiming that the money had been deposited by his alleged biological father, a relatively well-off businessman from the state of Piauí, in order to prevent a legal dispute over paternity.

Costa's explanation was promptly accepted but not further investigated. The court, the right-wing opposition, and the corporate media turned their full attention to the leaking of the bank statement as a breach of Costa's financial privacy rights. The right-wing opposition and a great part of the corporate media called the release of Costa's bank statement state-orchestrated harassment. The Federal Police of Brazil began an investigation into the case, which soon spiraled into a media circus for the Labor Party: officials and directors at the Caixa Econômica Federal confessed to releasing Costa's bank statement. The alleged chain of command went up as far as the Ministry of Finance, and the bank's chairman said that he handed the details of the account to Palocci personally. The minister denied this, but resigned on March 27, 2006, and was replaced by economist Guido Mantega.

== Personal life ==
He is a São Paulo FC fan.

Political offices
| Preceded by Welson Gasparini | Mayor of Ribeirão Preto; 1993–1996; 2001–2002 | Succeeded by Luiz Roberto Jábali |
| Preceded by Luiz Roberto Jábali | Mayor of Ribeirão Preto; 1993–1996; 2001–2002 | Succeeded by Gilberto Maggioni |
| Preceded by Pedro Malan | Minister of Finance; 2003–2006 | Succeeded by Guido Mantega |
| Preceded by Erenice Guerra | Chief of Staff of the Presidency; 2011 | Succeeded by Gleisi Hoffmann |
