= Second inauguration of Luiz Inácio Lula da Silva =

2007 presidential inauguration of Luiz Inácio Lula da Silva
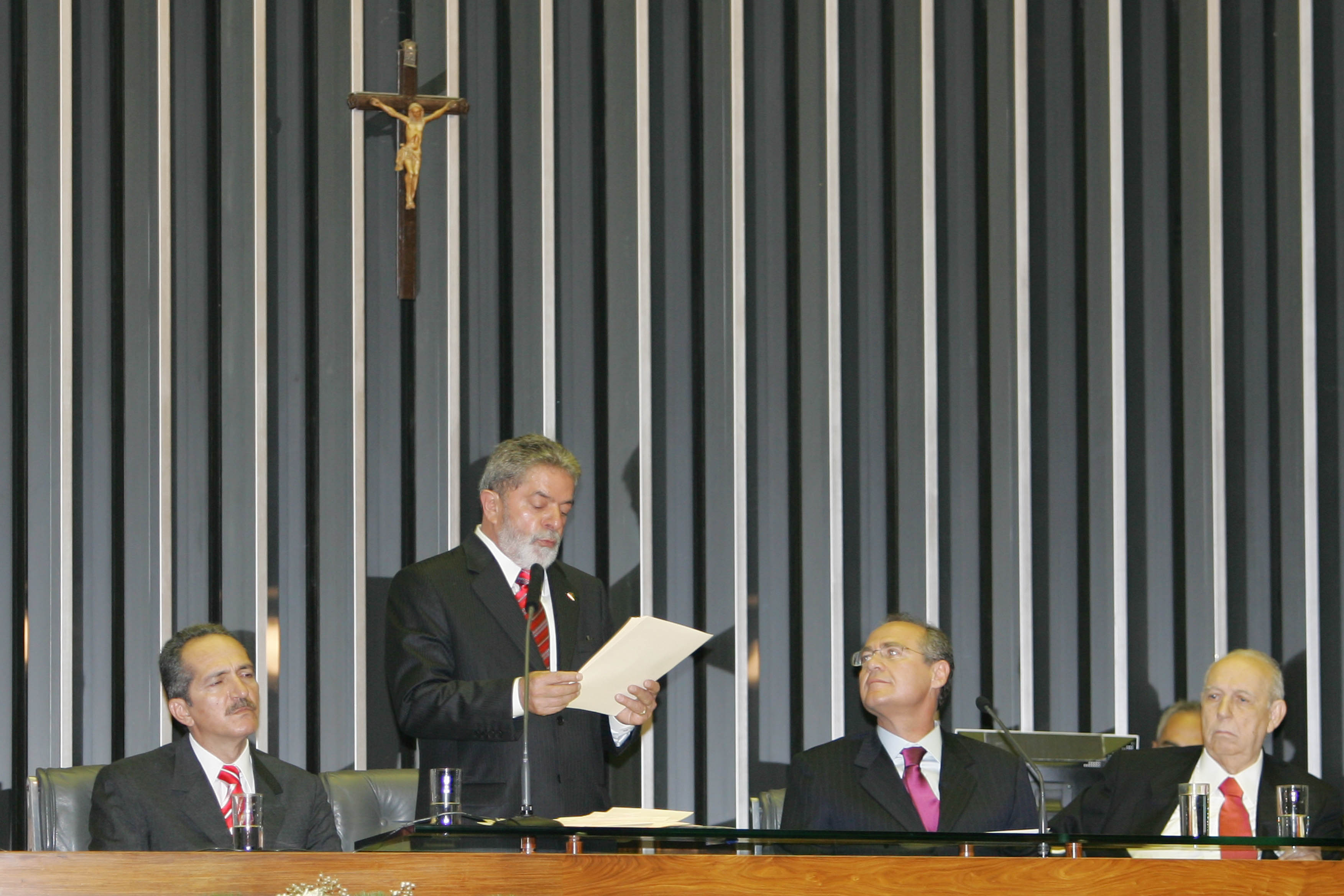
- Lula addressing the National Congress after signing the investiture document. On the left, Aldo Rebelo, President of the Chamber of Deputies, Renan Calheiros, President of the Senate and Congress, and Vice President José Alencar.
- Date: 1 January 2007; 19 years ago
- Time: 4:00 pm (BRST)
- Location: National Congress of Brazil Brasília, DF
- Participants: Luiz Inácio Lula da Silva; 35th president of Brazil — Assuming office José Alencar; 23rd vice president of Brazil — Assuming office Renan Calheiros; President of the Federal Senate — Administering oath

The second inauguration of Luiz Inácio Lula da Silva as President of Brazil was held on 1 January 2007. He was inaugurated again with Vice President José Alencar. The ceremony began after 4pm (BRST) at the Ulysses Guimarães plenary chamber in Brasília and was presided by the president of the Federal Senate, Renan Calheiros. Just like the first inauguration, the reelect President and Vice President read and signed the investiture document and the National Anthem was played by the Brazilian Marine Corps band.

== Coverage ==
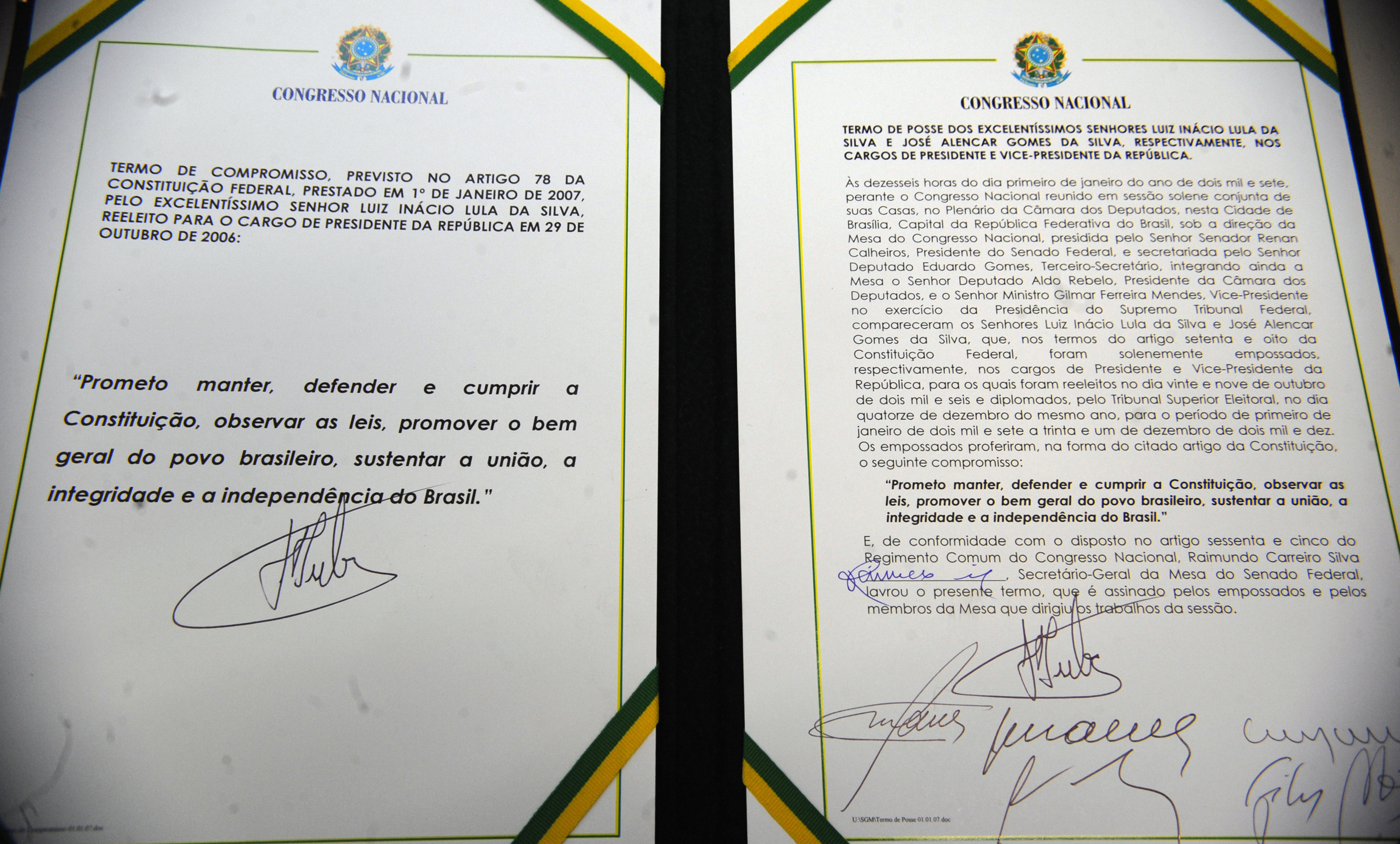
Constitutional commitment and presidential investiture document of Lula and José Alencar.

Lula's inauguration, which was scheduled to begin at 4pm, began with 18 minutes of delay, with a parade in a Rolls-Royce Silver Wraith between the Cathedral of Brasília and the National Congress, along with First Lady Marisa Letícia, Vice President José Alencar and Second Lady Mariza Gomes and the Planalto Palace guard, the Independence Dragons, and other security agents. It was the second time a president used the Rolls-Royce two times in a row after taking office, after Fernando Henrique Cardoso. The parade was in an open car, after heavy rain in Brasília. Also due to the rain, only a few people were in the Three Powers Plaza during the parade.

Arriving at the Congress, President and Vice President were received and greeted by the Presidents of the Chamber of Deputies, Aldo Rebelo, and the Senate, Renan Calheiros. After that, they climbed the ramp and headed to the plenary of the Chamber, where the president of the Senate opened the joint session of inauguration of Lula and Alencar. Both made the oath of office and read the investiture document: "I promise to preserve, defend and uphold the Constitution, observe the Laws, promote the general welfare of the Brazilian people, sustain the union, the integrity and the independence of Brazil". After the reading, the President and the Vice President signed the investiture document, that was succeeded by the National Anthem played by the Brazilian Marine Corps band.

Following the inauguration ceremony, Lula begins his speech, listing the achievements of his first term, as well as his priorities of the second term. Leaving the Congress, the President reviews the Brazilian Armed Forces troops and a 21-gun salute is fired. The National Anthem was played for a second time. After that, she enters the Rolls-Royce one more time, while the Smoke Squadron flies over the Monumental Axis, towards the Planalto Palace, where he climbed the ramp. He then received the presidential sash and headed towards the parlatorium, where he gave another speech to the public present.

The inauguration also had the presence of ministers, state governors and mayors, besides diplomatic representatives, among them foreign ambassadors. Different from his first inauguration, there were no foreign heads of State present, and for this reason the traditional dinner at the Itamaraty Palace didn't happen. The ceremony ended during the evening, with concerts of many musical attractions at the Three Powers Plaza.

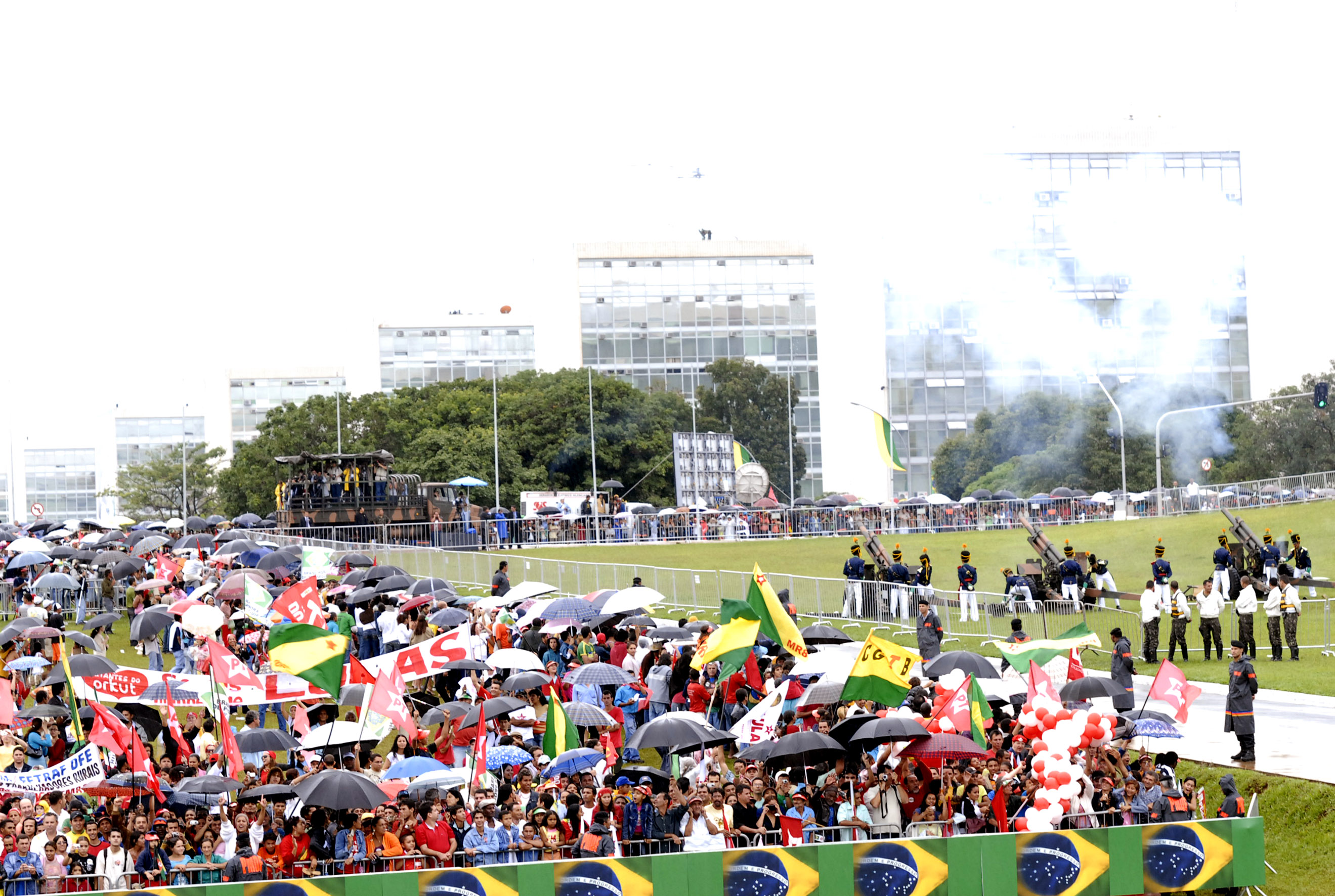
The 21-gun salute.

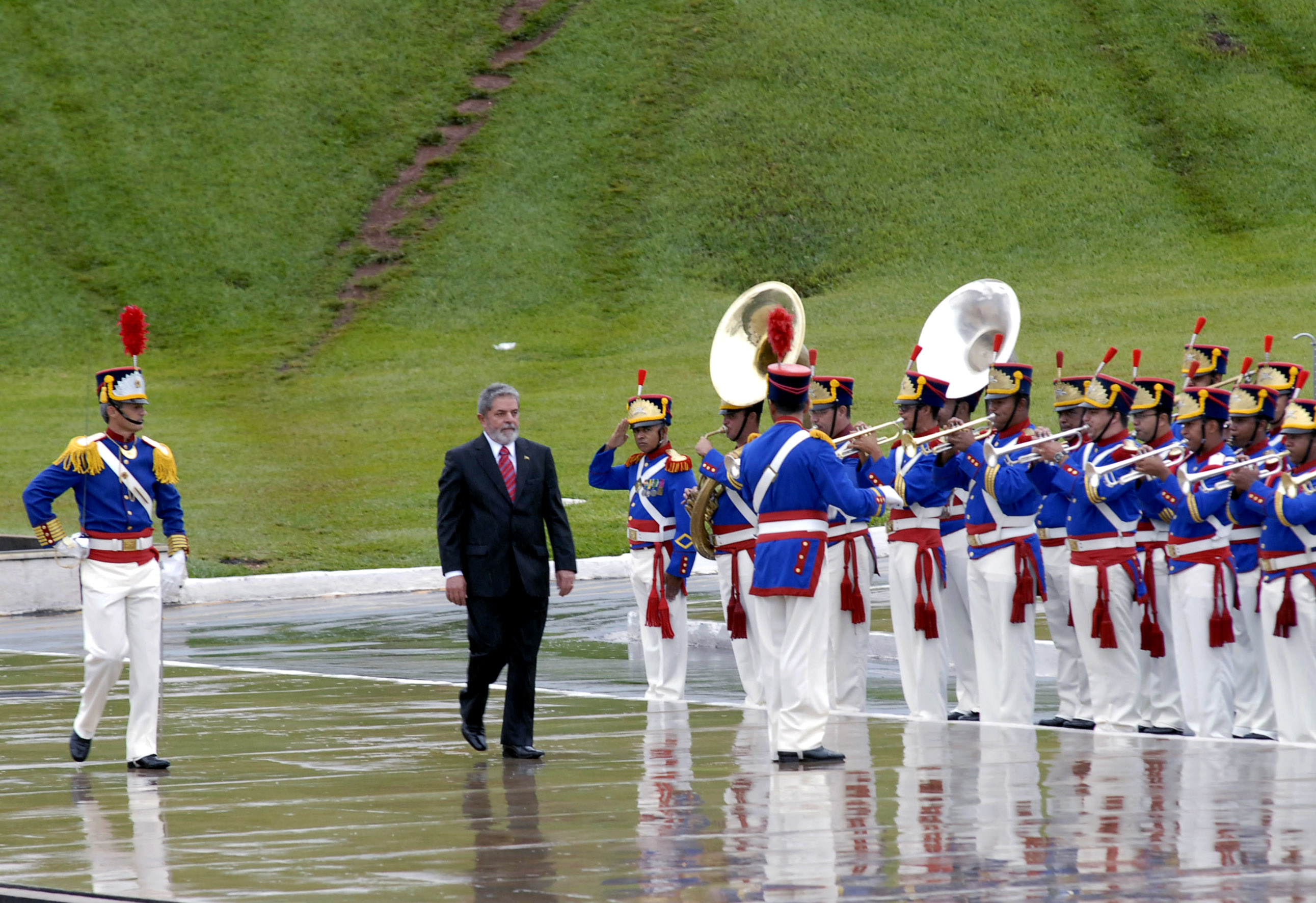
Lula reviewing the Brazilian Armed Forces troops.

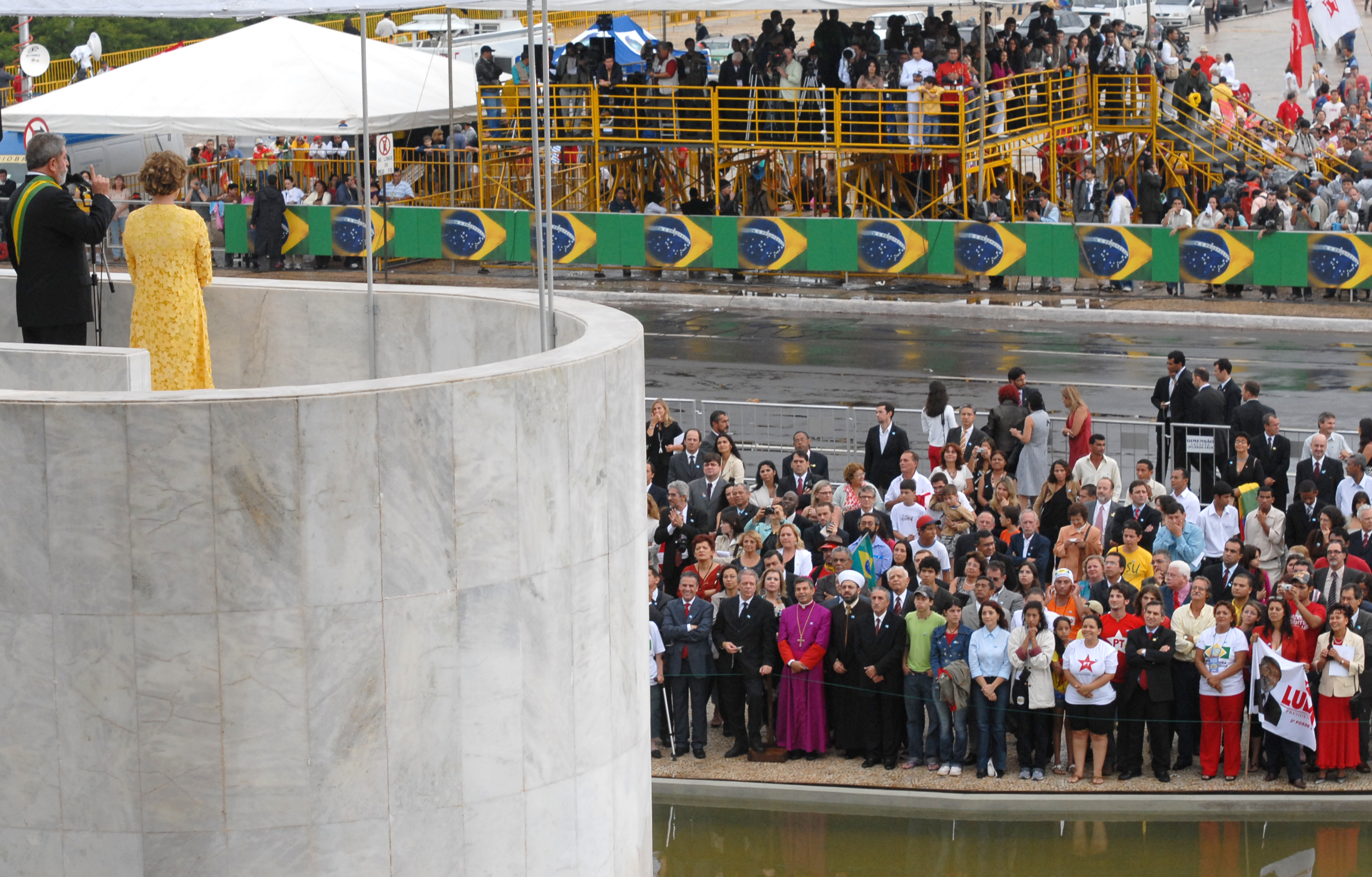
Lula's speech at the Planalto Palace parlatorium.
