= Chief of Staff of the Presidency =

Government official who heads the Civil House of the Presidency of Brazil

Minister of State Head of the Civilian House of the Presidency of the Republic of Brazil
- Ministro de Estado Chefe da Casa Civil da Presidência da República
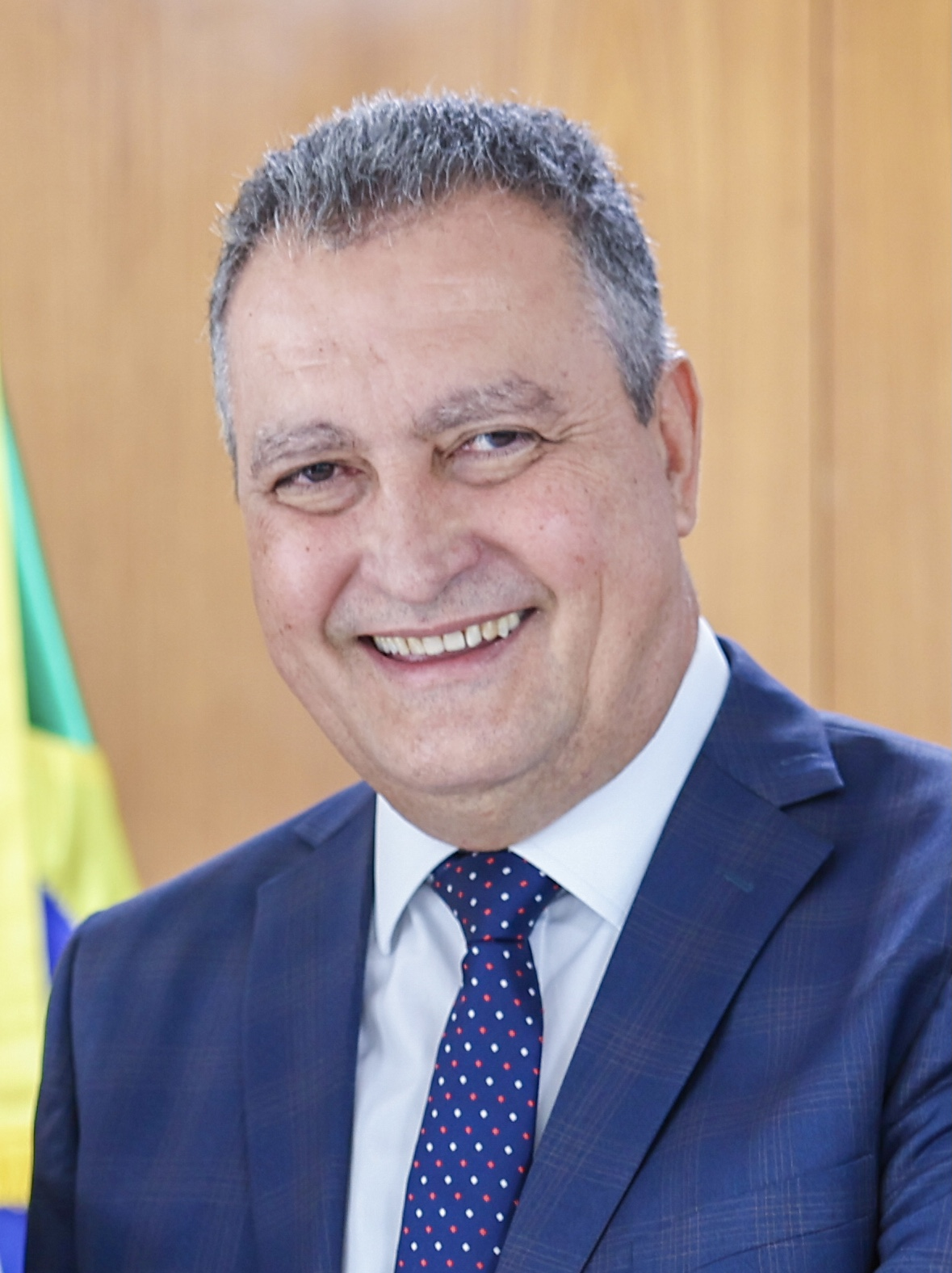
- Incumbent; Rui Costa since 1 January 2023
- Type: Ministry
- Member of: the Cabinet
- Reports to: the president
- Seat: Planalto Palace, Brasília
- Nominator: President of Brazil
- Constituting instrument: Constitution of Brazil
- Formation: 1 December 1938; 87 years ago
- First holder: Luís Fernandes Vergara
- Salary: R$39,293.33 monthly
- Website: www.gov.br/casacivil

The Minister of State Head of the Civilian House of the Presidency of the Republic (Portuguese: Ministro de Estado Chefe da Casa Civil da Presidência da República) is the chief of staff of the Presidency of the Federative Republic of Brazil, and a member of the president's cabinet. The post was established on 1 December 1938.

In Brazil, the chief of staff is a member of the president's cabinet, with the rank of minister. As of 2009, the office of the chief of staff had an annual budget of US$3.1 billion.

The chief of staff is responsible for assisting the president and overseeing all cabinet requests and bureaucratic procedures involving the presidency. Other responsibilities include negotiations with Congress and state governors. For that reason, the presidential chief of staff is generally regarded as the "second most powerful person in Brazil".

== List of chiefs of staff of the presidency ==
No.	Portrait	Minister	Took office	Left office	Time in office	Party	President
1	Luís Fernandes Vergara	Luís Fernandes Vergara (1894–1973)	1 December 1938	29 October 1945	6 years, 332 days	Independent	Getúlio Vargas (Ind)
2	Lino Moreira	Lino Moreira (1882–1962)	29 October 1945	31 January 1946	94 days	Independent	José Linhares (Ind)
3	Gabriel Monteiro da Silva	Gabriel Monteiro da Silva (1900–1946)	31 January 1946	5 December 1946	308 days	Independent	Eurico Gaspar Dutra (PSD)
4	José Pereira Lira	José Pereira Lira (1899–1985)	16 December 1946	31 January 1951	4 years, 46 days	PSD	Eurico Gaspar Dutra (PSD)
5	Lourival Fontes	Lourival Fontes (1899–1967)	31 January 1951	24 August 1954	3 years, 205 days	UDN	Getúlio Vargas (PTB)
6	José Monteiro de Castro	José Monteiro de Castro (1909–1994)	24 August 1954	11 November 1955	1 year, 79 days	UDN	Café Filho (PSP); Carlos Luz (PSD)
7	Paulo de Lira Tavares	Paulo de Lira Tavares (1901–1959)	11 November 1955	31 January 1956	81 days	Independent	Nereu Ramos (PSD)
8	Álvaro Lins	Álvaro Lins (1912–1970)	31 January 1956	5 November 1956	279 days	PSD	Juscelino Kubitschek (PSD)
9	Victor Nunes Leal	Victor Nunes Leal (1914–1985)	5 November 1956	10 August 1959	2 years, 278 days	Independent	Juscelino Kubitschek (PSD)
10	José Sette Câmara Filho	José Sette Câmara Filho (1920–2002)	10 August 1959	21 April 1960	255 days	PSD	Juscelino Kubitschek (PSD)
11	Osvaldo Maia Penido	Osvaldo Maia Penido (1908–1989)	21 April 1960	31 January 1961	285 days	Independent	Juscelino Kubitschek (PSD)
12	Francisco de Paula Quintanilha Ribeiro	Francisco de Paula Quintanilha Ribeiro (1915–1972)	31 January 1961	25 August 1961	206 days	Independent	Jânio Quadros (PTN)
13	Floriano Augusto Ramos	Floriano Augusto Ramos (1914–2004)	25 August 1961	8 September 1961	14 days	Independent	Ranieri Mazzilli (PSD)

No.	Portrait	Minister	Took office	Left office	Time in office	Party	Prime Minister
14	Hermes Lima	Hermes Lima (1902–1978)	8 September 1961	12 September 1962	1 year, 4 days	PTB	Tancredo Neves (PSD); Brochado da Rocha (PSD)

No.	Portrait	Minister	Took office	Left office	Time in office	Party	President
15	Evandro Lins e Silva	Evandro Lins e Silva (1912–2002)	24 January 1963	18 June 1963	2 years, 145 days	Independent	João Goulart (PTB)
16	Darcy Ribeiro	Darcy Ribeiro (1922–1997)	18 June 1963	31 March 1964	287 days	PCB	João Goulart (PTB)
17	Getúlio de Moura	Getúlio de Moura (1903–1981)	2 April 1964	15 April 1964	13 days	PSD	Ranieri Mazzilli (PSD)
18	Luís Viana Filho	Luís Viana Filho (1908–1990)	15 April 1964	6 May 1966	2 years, 21 days	PSD; ARENA	Castelo Branco (Military dictatorship)
19	Luís NAvarro de Brito	Luís NAvarro de Brito (1935–1986)	6 May 1966	15 March 1967	313 days	Independent	Castelo Branco (ARENA)
20	Rondon Pacheco	Rondon Pacheco (1919–2016)	15 March 1967	30 October 1969	2 years, 229 days	ARENA	Costa e Silva (ARENA); Provisional Governative Junta (Military junta)
21	João Leitão de Abreu	João Leitão de Abreu (1913–1992)	30 October 1969	15 March 1974	4 years, 136 days	Independent	Emílio Garrastazu Médici (ARENA)
22	Golbery do Couto e Silva	Golbery do Couto e Silva (1911–1987)	15 March 1974	6 August 1981	7 years, 144 days	Independent	Ernesto Geisel (ARENA); João Figueiredo (ARENA)
–	João de Carvalho Oliveira	João de Carvalho Oliveira; Acting	6 August 1981	12 August 1981	6 days	Independent	João Figueiredo (PDS)
23	João Leitão de Abreu	João Leitão de Abreu (1913–1992)	12 August 1981	15 March 1985	3 years, 215 days	Independent	João Figueiredo (PDS)
24	José Hugo Castelo Branco	José Hugo Castelo Branco (1926–1988)	15 March 1985	14 February 1986	336 days	Independent	José Sarney (MDB)
25	Marco Maciel	Marco Maciel (1940–2021)	14 February 1986	30 April 1987	1 year, 75 days	PFL	José Sarney (MDB)
26	Ronaldo Costa Couto	Ronaldo Costa Couto (born 1942)	30 April 1987	15 December 1989	2 years, 229 days	Independent	José Sarney (MDB)
27	Luís Roberto Ponte	Luís Roberto Ponte (born 1934)	15 December 1989	15 March 1990	90 days	MDB	José Sarney (MDB)
28	Marcos Antônio de Salvo Coimbra	Marcos Antônio de Salvo Coimbra (1927–2013)	15 March 1990	2 October 1992	2 years, 201 days	Independent	Fernando Collor (PRN)
29	Henrique Hargreaves	Henrique Hargreaves (born 1936)	5 October 1992	1 November 1993	1 year, 27 days	Independent	Itamar Franco (MDB)
30	Tarcísio de Almeida Cunha	Tarcísio de Almeida Cunha (born 1929)	1 November 1993	8 February 1994	99 days	Independent	Itamar Franco (MDB)
31	Henrique Hargreaves	Henrique Hargreaves (born 1936)	8 February 1994	1 January 1995	327 days	Independent	Itamar Franco (MDB)
32	Clóvis Carvalho	Clóvis Carvalho (born 1938)	1 January 1995	1 January 1999	4 years, 0 days	PSDB	Fernando Henrique Cardoso (PSDB)
33	Pedro Parente	Pedro Parente (born 1953)	1 January 1999	1 January 2003	4 years, 0 days	PSDB	Fernando Henrique Cardoso (PSDB)
34	José Dirceu	José Dirceu (born 1946)	1 January 2003	21 June 2005	2 years, 171 days	PT	Luiz Inácio Lula da Silva (PT)
35	Dilma Rousseff	Dilma Rousseff (born 1947)	21 June 2005	30 March 2010	4 years, 282 days	PT	Luiz Inácio Lula da Silva (PT)
36	Erenice Guerra	Erenice Guerra (born 1959)	30 March 2010	16 September 2010	170 days	PT	Luiz Inácio Lula da Silva (PT)
37	Carlos Eduardo Esteves Lima	Carlos Eduardo Esteves Lima (born 1959)	16 September 2010	1 January 2011	107 days	Independent	Luiz Inácio Lula da Silva (PT)
38	Antonio Palocci	Antonio Palocci (born 1960)	1 January 2011	7 June 2011	157 days	PT	Dilma Rousseff (PT)
39	Gleisi Hoffmann	Gleisi Hoffmann (born 1965)	8 June 2011	3 February 2014	2 years, 240 days	PT	Dilma Rousseff (PT)
40	Aloizio Mercadante	Aloizio Mercadante (born 1954)	3 February 2014	2 October 2015	1 year, 241 days	PT	Dilma Rousseff (PT)
41	Jaques Wagner	Jaques Wagner (born 1951)	2 October 2015	17 March 2016	167 days	PT	Dilma Rousseff (PT)
42	Luiz Inácio Lula da Silva	Luiz Inácio Lula da Silva (Note: Nominated by former president Dilma Rousseff on 16 March 2016, his swearing-in ceremony was suspended on 18 March by a preliminary injunction accepted by justice Gilmar Mendes of the Supreme Federal Court.) (born 1945)	17 March 2016	18 March 2016	1 day	PT	Dilma Rousseff (PT)
–	Eva Chiavon	Eva Chiavon (born 1960); Acting	18 March 2016	12 May 2016	55 days	PT	Dilma Rousseff (PT)
43	Eliseu Padilha	Eliseu Padilha (1945–2023)	12 May 2016	1 January 2019	2 years, 234 days	MDB	Michel Temer (MDB)
44	Onyx Lorenzoni	Onyx Lorenzoni (born 1954)	1 January 2019	18 February 2020	1 year, 48 days	DEM	Jair Bolsonaro (PSL)
45	Walter Braga Netto	Walter Braga Netto (born 1957)	18 February 2020	29 March 2021	1 year, 39 days	Independent	Jair Bolsonaro (Ind)
46	Luiz Eduardo Ramos	Luiz Eduardo Ramos (born 1956)	29 March 2021	4 August 2021	128 days	Independent	Jair Bolsonaro (Ind)
47	Ciro Nogueira	Ciro Nogueira (born 1968)	4 August 2021	30 December 2022	1 year, 148 days	PP	Jair Bolsonaro (PL)
–	Jônathas Assunção	Jônathas Assunção; Acting	30 December 2022	1 January 2023	2 days	Independent	Jair Bolsonaro (PL)
48	Rui Costa	Rui Costa (born 1963)	1 January 2023	Incumbent	3 years, 250 days	PT	Luiz Inácio Lula da Silva (PT)
