= Erenice Guerra =

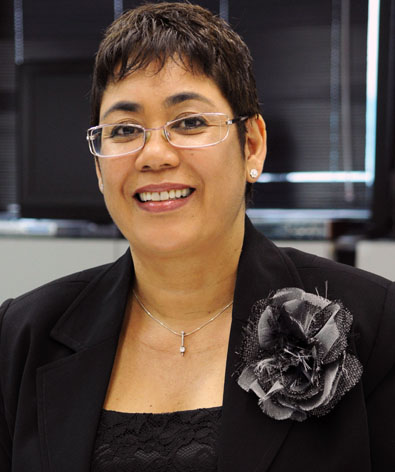

Chief of Staff of the Presidency
- In office 1 April 2010 – 16 September 2010
- President: Luiz Inácio Lula da Silva
- Preceded by: Dilma Rousseff
- Succeeded by: Carlos Esteves Lima (acting)

Personal details
- Born: Erenice Alves Guerra; 15 February 1959 (age 67) Brasília, Federal District, Brazil
- Party: PT (1981–present)
- Profession: Lawyer

Erenice Alves Guerra (Brazilian Portuguese: [eɾeˈnisj ˈawviz ˈɡɛʁɐ]; born 15 February 1959) was the 41st Chief of Staff of Brazil. She is best known for resigning from the post of Chief of Staff due to credible allegations of corruption and nepotism for which she was publicly reprimanded by the President's Public Ethics Committee. She was born in Brasília and is a law graduate, specialized in health law.

She was Chief of Staff of the Secretariat of Public Security of the Federal District Government and general manager of the Federal District Metro. She was also head of the legal department of the Brasília Society of Collective Transport (TCB).

At the federal administration level, she was manager of Eletronorte, Attorney General of the National School of Public Administration (ENAP), Legal Adviser of the Ministry of Mines and Energy (MME) and consultant of the United Nations Educational, Scientific and Cultural Organization (UNESCO) at the Ministry of Health. She also worked in the council of the Chamber of Deputies of Brazil.

Erenice was an advisor at Petrobras and the São Francisco Hydroelectric Company (CHESF). Currently she is member of the board of directors of the Brazilian Development Bank (BNDES).

From 2005 to 2010 she held the position of Executive Secretary of the Presidential Staff Office.

Political offices
Preceded by Dilma Rousseff	Chief of Staff of the Presidency; 2010	Succeeded by Carlos Esteves Lima (acting)
