= Maria da Conceição Tavares =

Brazilian economist (1930–2024)

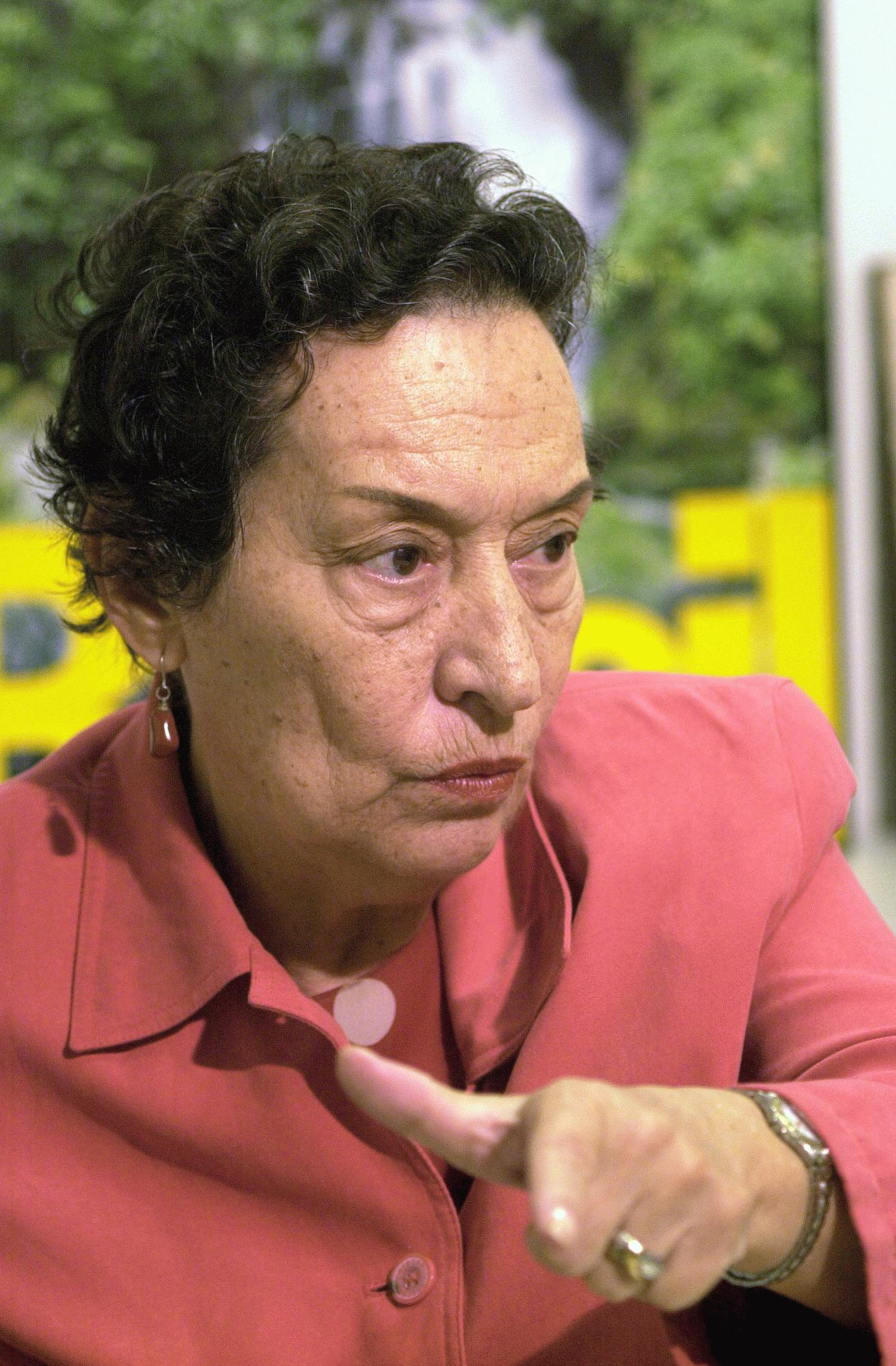

Federal Deputy for Rio de Janeiro
- In office February 1, 1995 – February 1, 1999
- Constituency: At-large

Personal details
- Born: Maria da Conceição de Almeida Tavares; April 24, 1930 Anadia, Portugal
- Died: June 8, 2024 (aged 94) Nova Friburgo, Rio de Janeiro, Brazil
- Party: Workers' Party (1994–2024)
- Other political affiliations: Brazilian Democratic Movement Party (1980–1989)
- Education: University of Brazil
- Occupation: Economist, politician, professor, writer
- Awards: Conspiracy Medal, Minas Gerais; Order of Rio Branco (Officer); Order of Merit (Commander)

Maria da Conceição Tavares (April 24, 1930 – June 8, 2024) was a Portuguese naturalized Brazilian economist. She was a full professor at the State University of Campinas (Unicamp) and professor emeritus of the Federal University of Rio de Janeiro (UFRJ). Her students included the former president of Brazil, Dilma Rousseff and José Serra, candidate to president of Brazil on several occasions. Tavares was affiliated with the Workers' Party, and she was a Federal Deputy representing the state of Rio de Janeiro between 1995 and 1999. Left-wing focused, she was the author of several books on Brazil's economic development as well as numerous journal articles.

== Early life ==
Maria da Conceição de Almeida Tavares was born in Anadia in the Aveiro District of Portugal on 24 April 1930. She grew up in the Portuguese capital of Lisbon. Her father was an anarchist who sheltered refugees from the Spanish Civil War. After starting an engineering course at the University of Lisbon, Tavares transferred to mathematical sciences, graduating in 1953. To escape the Estado Novo dictatorship in Portugal under António de Oliveira Salazar, she moved to Brazil in February 1954, already married to her first husband, Pedro José Serra Soares, and got pregnant with their daughter Laura. They settled in Rio de Janeiro. From her second marriage, to Antônio Carlos de Magalhães Macedo, she had a son.

== Career ==
Because she was unable to have her qualifications recognised in Brazil to allow her to teach at university, she began working in 1955 as a statistician at the National Institute of Immigration and Colonization (INIC), now the Instituto Nacional de Colonização e Reforma Agrária (INCRA). In 1957, she became a Brazilian citizen. At that time, after realising that knowledge of mathematics was not enough for the professional path she intended to follow, she enrolled to study economics at the University of Brazil, now the Federal University of Rio de Janeiro (UFRJ), completing the course in 1960. In 1958, she became a mathematical analyst at the Brazilian Development Bank (BNDES), where she worked until 1960. Between 1958 and 1960 she was also a member of the Executive Group (Grupo Executivo) for Heavy Mechanical Industry (Geimape), one of the industry-coordinating bodies established during the government of President Kubitschek.

The work of Tavares was influenced in particular by three other Brazilian economists, Celso Furtado, Caio Prado Júnior and Ignácio Rangel. She published numerous articles and several books. In 1963, she published her first paper, Rise and fall of the import-substitution process in Brazil, in which she discussed import-substituting industrialization as an historical model of development. In 1965 and 1967, she was a visiting professor at the Fundação Getulio Vargas, an organization established to "stimulate Brazil's socioeconomic development". In 1967 she participated in a meeting promoted by the Ford Foundation, which discussed the organization of postgraduate studies in economics in Brazil. This led, in 1972, to the establishment of the National Association for Graduate Studies in Economics (Anpec). A common theme of her work has been that Brazilians with more progressive views lacked knowledge of the monetary aspects of the country's economy.

In 1968, Tavares was invited by the United Nations Economic Commission for Latin America and the Caribbean (ECLAC) in Santiago de Chile to teach at the Institute of Economy and Planning (ESCOLATINA), part of the University of Chile, as a visiting professor. Between October 1971 and May 1972, she did postgraduate studies at the University of Paris 1 Panthéon-Sorbonne University. However, due to the worsening political situation in Chile she interrupted her course to return to Santiago to assist the government of Salvador Allende, working in the Ministry of Economy as a volunteer advisor. At the same time, she continued to be involved in Brazilian policy arguments about income distribution with the monetarist economist Carlos Geraldo Langoni, who would go on to become the governor of the Bank of Brazil.

In March 1973, Tavares returned to UFRJ. In the same year, she also began teaching at the State University of Campinas (Unicamp). In late 1973, she was visiting professor at the National Autonomous University of Mexico and, in 1974, at the Centro de Investigación y Docencia Económicas, in the same country. Returning to Brazil in November 1974, she was detained at the international airport in Rio de Janeiro and held for several days in the premises of the DOI-CODI (Department of Internal Operations/ Centre for Internal Defence Operations), the intelligence and political repression agency of the military dictatorship between 1964 and 1985. She was released on the intervention of the president Ernesto Geisel after he was contacted by the Minister of Finance, Mário Henrique Simonsen and by Severo Gomes, the Minister of Industry and Commerce.

In early 1975, she was invited to be an economic consultant for the Financiadora de Estudos e Projetos (Funding Agency for Studies and Projects - FINEP), a position she held until 1979. At the same time, she continued to work with the economics and administration faculty of UFRJ. Also in 1975, she obtained a doctorate from UFRJ, with a thesis on "Accumulation of capital and industrialization in Brazil". Tavares became a full professor of macroeconomics at UFRJ in 1978, with a thesis entitled "Cycle and crisis: the recent movement of the Brazilian economy". Her future studies were largely related to financial and monetary economics, as she expanded her criticism of Brazilian monetarists. In general terms, her ideas are that the State must play a leading role in inducing investment and in planning the country's economic development. These views were underlain by a strong concern about underdevelopment.

Tavares was a member of the University Council of UFRJ in 1984 and 1985. In 1986, she became director of the Institute of Economics of that University. In March 1986, she became known to the public for her testimony on television in defence of the Cruzado Plan, an economic stabilization programme designed to control rampant inflation, which was implemented by the government of José Sarney. She supported measures to remove wage and price indexing, combined with a price freeze. This was successful for nine months but an increase in wages at the end of 1986 stimulated a wage-price spiral of demand-induced inflation.

== Death ==
Tavares died in Nova Friburgo, in the state of Rio de Janeiro, on June 8, 2024, at the age of 94. Her body was cremated, and on June 17 her ashes were deposited in the gardens of the Institute of Economy of the State University of Campinas. A tree was planted on the same spot as a tribute to her work in that institution.

== Political activism ==
Tavares became a member of the Partido do Movimento Democrático Brasileiro (Brazilian Democratic Movement Party – PMDB), becoming a member of the national executive after being nominated by the PMDB women's movement. In 1988 she left the executive but in 1989 she actively supported the party's presidential candidate, Ulysses Guimarães, national president of the PMDB, for the presidency of Brazil. After his defeat in the first round of the election, she left the party and supported the Worker's Party (PT) candidate, Luiz Inácio Lula da Silva, who was defeated by Fernando Collor de Mello in the second ballot.

Tavares then temporarily left political activism and began dedicating herself exclusively to teaching at UFRJ and Unicamp, writing texts on economics and giving lectures around the country. In 1992, she became president of the Instituto de Estudos Sobre o Rio de Janeiro (IERJ) for the second time, a position she held until 1994. In June 1993, she retired from UFRJ and began to write regularly for the Folha de S.Paulo newspaper, opposing the Plano Real (Real Plan), an economic stabilization programme implemented by the finance minister of the Itamar Franco government, Fernando Henrique Cardoso. In January 1994, she returned to politics, joining the Workers' Party.

Tavares was elected as a federal deputy for Rio de Janeiro state in October 1994. Upon taking office in the Chamber of Deputies in Brasília in February 1995, she became a member of the Taxation and Finance Committee. Known for the vehemence with which she defended her views, Tavares opposed the constitutional reforms proposed by the now President Fernando Henrique Cardoso. In her criticisms of the government's economic programme, she repeatedly stated that the fundamental problems of the Plano Real were the exchange rate policy and high interest rates, which, together with removal of price controls and trade liberalization, would, she thought, lead to a process of dismantling the country's productive capacity. She also criticised the government's policy to break up state monopolies in oil, telecommunications and mining. She noted that she always voted against the government and that it was very exhausting. Tavares left the Chamber of Deputies in January 1999, at the end of the legislature, having decided not run for re-election.

Tavares published her last regular article in Folha de S. Paulo on September 19, 2004, entitled "Farewell to the macroeconomic debate". In November 2005, she was one of the founders of the Celso Furtado International Centre for Development Policies, and was its first president. She was still writing for the Centre in 2021.

Over 60 years, she trained generations of Brazilian economists and political leaders, including former President of Brazil Dilma Rousseff; José Serra, who held several ministerial positions in the federal government and was also governor of São Paulo state; economics professor Carlos Lessa; and the former president of the Brazilian Development Bank Luciano Coutinho. Tavares participated in several editions of the World Social Forum, a gathering organized to provide an alternative view to that of the better-known World Economic Forum. She became a supporter of the concept of a universal basic income. She was the subject of a biographical film, entitled Livre Pensar (Free to think), directed by José Mariani, which was released in 2018.

== Publications ==
In her academic studies, Tavares specialized in interpreting the development of capitalism in Brazil. She was the author of several published works, some of which remain required reading for university economics courses in Brazil and have also been translated into Spanish, in addition to hundreds of articles in specialized magazines and periodicals. Her main publications were:

- 1986. Acumulação de capital e industrialização no Brasil (Capital Accumulation and Industrialization in Brazil). Campinas. Republished in 1998 by Editora da Unicamp. Instituto de Economia da Unicamp
- 1978. Ciclo e crise: o movimento recente da industrialização brasileira (Cycle and Crisis: the recent movement of the Brazilian economy). Campinas, Instituto de Economia
- 1997. Poder e dinheiro (Power and Money). José Luís Fiori (ed.) Petrópolis, Vozes
- 1972. Da substituição de importações ao capitalismo financeiro (From import substitution to financial capitalism). Rio de Janeiro, Zahar
- 1984. A economia política da crise: problemas e impasses da política econômica brasileira (The political economy of the crisis: problems and impasses in Brazilian economic policy). Rio de Janeiro, Vozes
- 1986. O grande salto para o caos (The great leap into chaos: the Cruzado Plan in afterword). Rio de Janeiro, Zahar. (with José Carlos de Assis)
- 1991. Japão, um caso exemplar de capitalismo organizado (Japan: an exemplary case of organized capitalism). Brasília, IPEA.
- 1993. (Des)ajuste global e modernização conservadora (Global (dis)adjustment and conservative modernization). Rio de Janeiro, Peace and Land. (with José Luís Fiori)
- 1993. O estado que nós queremos (The state we want). Rio de Janeiro, Space and Time
- 1994. Em defesa do interesse nacional (In defense of the national interest: disinformation and alienation of public property). Rio de Janeiro, Peace and Land
- 1994. Lições contemporâneas de uma economia popular (Contemporary lessons from a popular economy). Rio de Janeiro, Markgraph
- 1997. Poder e dinheiro (Power and Money). José Luís Fiori (ed.) Petrópolis, Vozes.

== Awards and honours ==
- 2019: A book, with her name as the title, was published in her honour. This provided a resumé of her career, as well as some of her best papers.
- 2011: Almirante Álvaro Alberto Award for Science and Technology.
- 2000: Medal Pedro Ernesto, from the City Council of Rio de Janeiro
- 1998: Second place in the Prêmio Jabuti award for publications in Economics, Administration, Business and Law
- 1998: Grand Officer of the Order of Bernardo O'Higgins from the Republic of Chile
- 1987: Order of the Merit of Labour, Ministry of Labour of Brazil.
- 1986: Officer of the Order of Rio Branco, Brazil.
- 1986: Medal of Honour of The Conspiracy, by the State Government of Minas Gerais

Awards
Prêmio Jabuti
Preceded by Roberto Campos; Francisco Gomes Matos; Bernardo Kucinski	Prêmio Jabuti for Economy, Administration, Business and Law; 1998; Served alongside: Antonio Dias Leite, José Luís Fiori, Jacques Marcovitch	Succeeded by Márcia Helena Mendes Ferraz; Herch Moysés Nussenzveig; Sônia Pitta Coelho; Francisco César Polcino Milies
