= Bernard Appy =

Brazilian economist (born 1962)

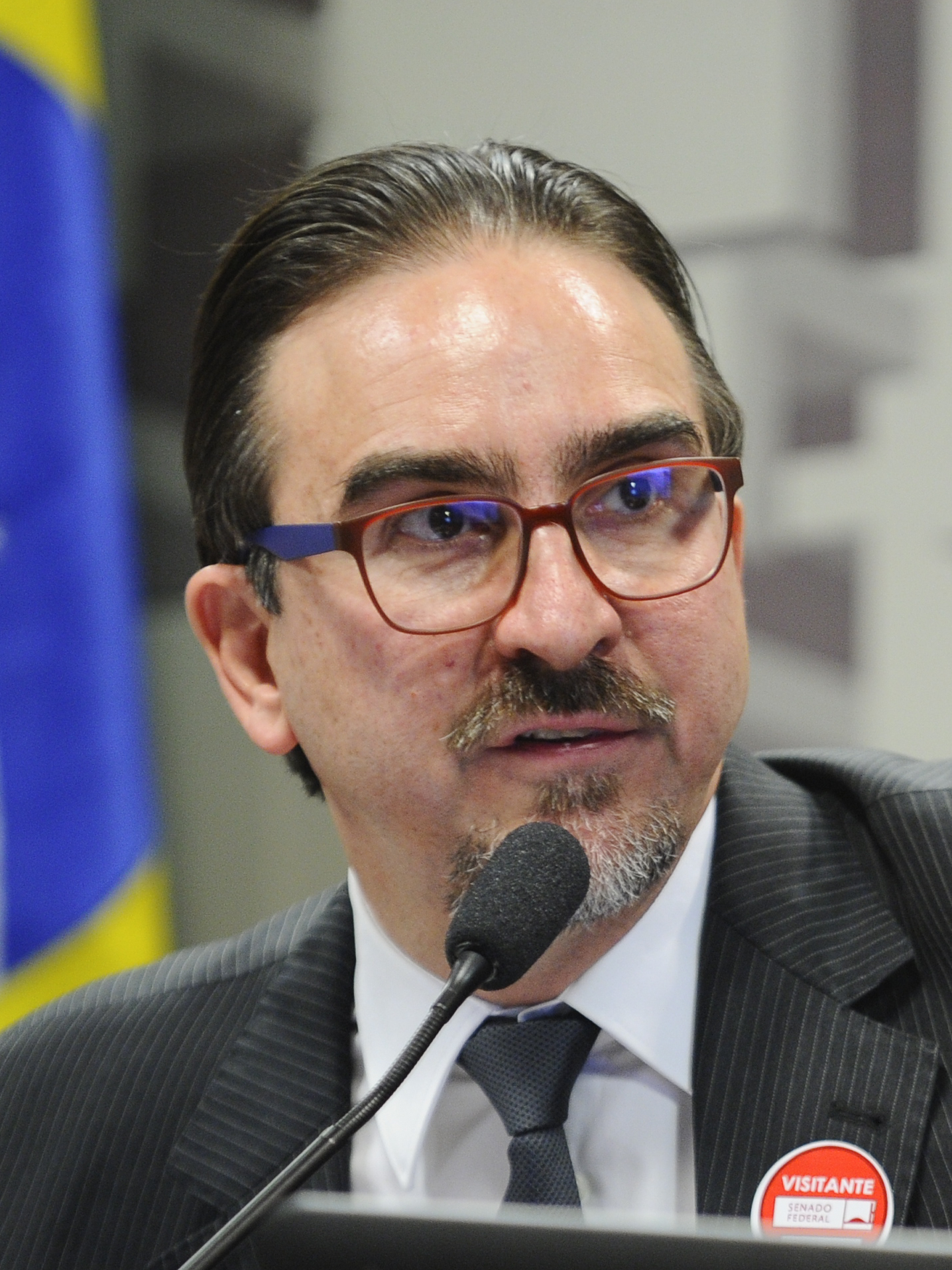
- Appy in 2017

Extraordinary Secretary for Tax Reform of the Ministry of Finance
- In office 1 January 2023 – 6 November 2025
- Minister: Fernando Haddad
- Preceded by: Office established
- Succeeded by: Office abolished

Extraordinary Secretary for Economic-Fiscal Reforms of the Ministry of Finance
- In office 5 August 2008 – 20 August 2009
- Minister: Guido Mantega
- Preceded by: Position established
- Succeeded by: Luiz Eduardo Melin de Carvalho e Silva

Secretary of Economic Policy of the Ministry of Finance
- In office 18 April 2007 – 5 August 2008
- Minister: Guido Mantega
- Preceded by: Julio Cesar Almeida
- Succeeded by: Nelson Barbosa
- In office 16 May 2005 – 31 March 2006
- Minister: Antonio Palocci; Guido Mantega
- Preceded by: Marcos Lisboa
- Succeeded by: Otavio Damaso

Executive Secretary of the Ministry of Finance
- In office 31 March 2006 – 18 April 2007
- Minister: Guido Mantega
- Preceded by: Unknown
- Succeeded by: Nelson Machado
- In office 3 January 2003 – 16 May 2005
- Minister: Antonio Palocci
- Preceded by: Amaury Bier
- Succeeded by: Unknown

Personal details
- Born: Bernard Appy; 19 February 1962 (age 64) São Paulo, São Paulo, Brazil
- Education: University of São Paulo (B.Ec); University of Campinas (M.Ec)
- Profession: Economist

Bernard Appy (born 19 February 1962) is a Brazilian economist known as one of the main architects of Brazil's tax reform (PEC 45/2019). He graduated in economics from the School of Economics, Business and Accounting of the University of São Paulo (FEA-USP) in 1985, and completed master's-level coursework in Economics at the Institute of Economics of UNICAMP, finishing in 1988. Between 2003 and 2009, he held several senior positions at the Ministry of Finance under President Lula, including Executive Secretary, Secretary of Economic Policy, and Extraordinary Secretary for Economic-Fiscal Reforms.

In December 2022, he was appointed by Fernando Haddad, Finance Minister of Lula's third government, as Extraordinary Secretary for Tax Reform of the Ministry of Finance, a position he held from 2023 to 2025, during which the tax reform (Constitutional Amendment 132/2023) was approved and regulated.

== Career ==
Between 1988 and 1993, Appy worked as a researcher at the Brazilian Center for Analysis and Planning (CEBRAP) and at the Institute of Public Sector Economics (IESP/FUNDAP), and served as an economic advisor to the Workers' Party (PT) leadership in the Chamber of Deputies. From 1993 to 2002, he was an economic consultant and founding partner of LCA Consultores and E3 – Escritório de Estudos Econômicos, while also teaching at PUC-SP between 1996 and 2002.

In 2002, he joined the transition team of president-elect Luiz Inácio Lula da Silva. He then held several positions at the Ministry of Finance between 2003 and 2009: Executive Secretary (2003–2005 and 2006–2007), Secretary of Economic Policy (2005–2006 and 2007–2008), and Extraordinary Secretary for Economic-Fiscal Reforms (2008–2009). During this period, he also chaired the Board of Directors of Banco do Brasil (2003–2009) and presided over CONFAZ on different occasions. In 2008, while heading the Secretariat of Economic Policy, he led the drafting of the tax reform proposal that became PEC 233/2008.

He left government in 2009 to become Director of Strategy and Planning at BM&FBOVESPA (2009–2011), and later returned to LCA Consultores as Director of Public Policy and Taxation (2011–2014). Since May 2015, he has directed the Centro de Cidadania Fiscal (CCiF), an independent think tank he founded to develop studies on tax reform and fiscal management. In that role, he was one of the main authors of PEC 45/2019, a proposal to unify taxes on goods and services that became a reference point in public debate and among presidential candidates in the 2018 elections.
