= Aloizio Mercadante =

Brazilian politician

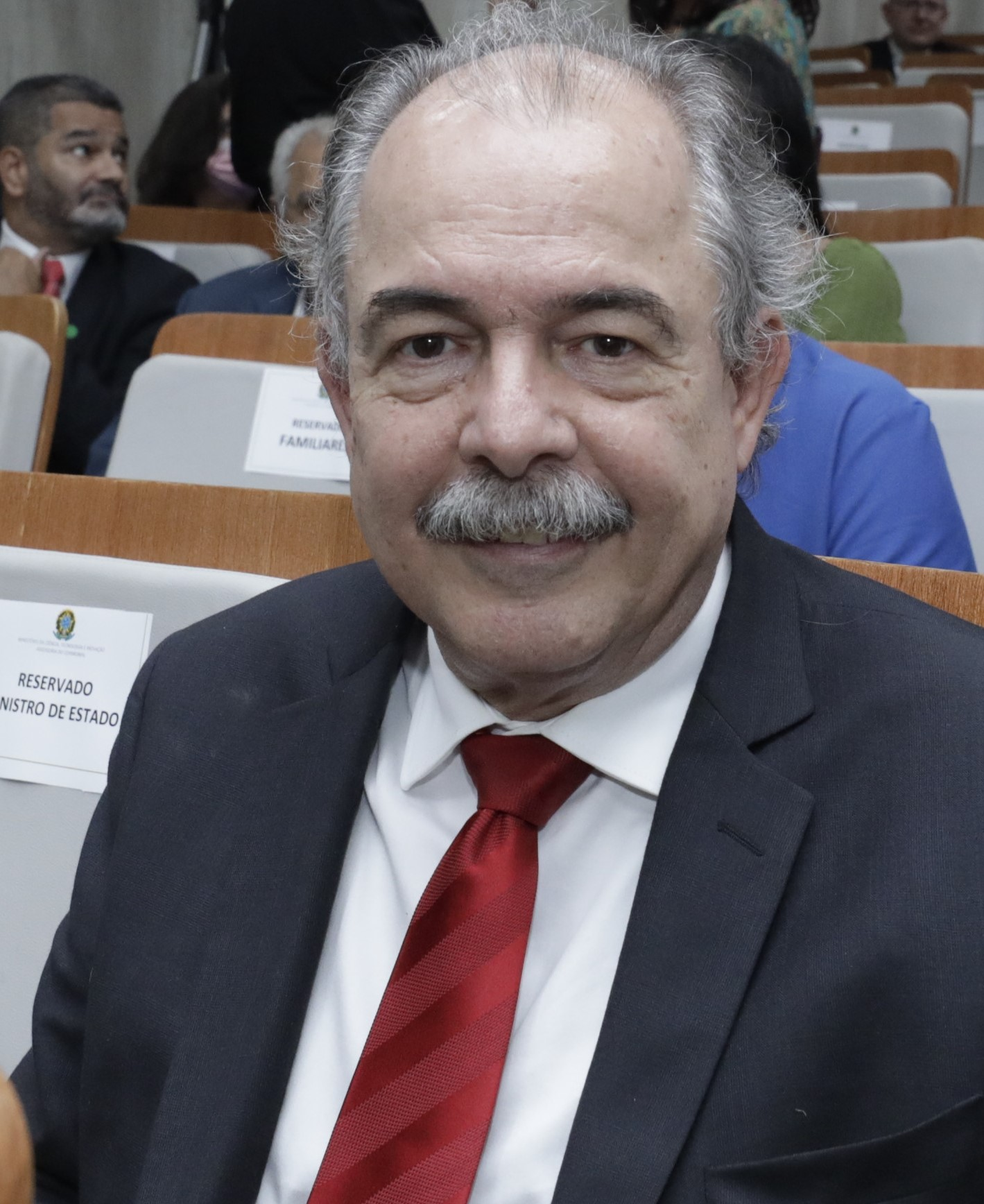

Chair of the Brazilian Development Bank
- Incumbent
- Assumed office 6 February 2023
- Appointed by: Luiz Inácio Lula da Silva
- Preceded by: Gustavo Montezano

Chair of the Perseu Abramo Foundation
- In office 3 April 2020 – 13 February 2023
- Deputy: Vivian Farias
- Preceded by: Marcio Pochmann
- Succeeded by: Paulo Okamotto

Minister of Education
- In office 2 October 2015 – 12 May 2016
- President: Dilma Rousseff
- Preceded by: Renato Janine Ribeiro
- Succeeded by: Mendonça Filho
- In office 24 January 2012 – 3 February 2014
- President: Dilma Rousseff
- Preceded by: Fernando Haddad
- Succeeded by: José Henrique Paim

Chief of Staff of the Presidency
- In office 3 February 2014 – 2 October 2015
- President: Dilma Rousseff
- Preceded by: Gleisi Hoffmann
- Succeeded by: Jaques Wagner

Minister of Science and Technology
- In office 1 January 2011 – 23 January 2012
- President: Dilma Rousseff
- Preceded by: Sérgio Machado Rezende
- Succeeded by: Marco Antonio Raupp

Senator for São Paulo
- In office 1 February 2003 – 1 January 2011
- Preceded by: José Serra
- Succeeded by: Aloysio Nunes

Member of the Chamber of Deputies
- In office 1 February 1999 – 1 February 2003
- Constituency: São Paulo
- In office 1 February 1991 – 1 February 1995
- Constituency: São Paulo

Personal details
- Born: 13 May 1954 (age 72) São Paulo, São Paulo, Brazil
- Party: Workers' Party (1980–present)
- Spouse: Maria Regina Barros
- Children: 2
- Education: University of São Paulo (BEc); State University of Campinas (MEc, PhD)
- Occupation: Politician
- Profession: Economist

Aloizio Mercadante Oliva (born 13 May 1954 in Santos, São Paulo) is a Brazilian economist and politician who served as the Chief of Staff of Brazil between 2014 and 2015. He was a founder of the Workers' Party in February 1980 and vice-chairman of the party between 1991 and 1999, then state senator from São Paulo between 2003 and 2010. From 2011 to 2012 he was Minister of Science, Technology and Innovation in Brazil, and in 2012 he became Minister of Education, due to Fernando Haddad's departure to run for mayor of São Paulo.

== Biography ==
The son of an Army general and former commander of ESG (War College), he graduated in economics from the University of São Paulo (FEA-USP). He holds a PhD and a master's degree in economics from the University of Campinas (Unicamp), and is a professor of economics at the Pontifical Catholic University of São Paulo (PUC-SP).

Mercadante was national vice president of the PT and secretary of international relations and member of the National Directorate and the National Executive. He participated in drafting PT government programs and was coordinator of the party's presidential campaigns in 1989 and 2002. He ran for vice-president of the Republic on Lula's ticket in the 1994 elections.

In his first race for a seat as a federal deputy in 1990, he was elected with more votes than any other deputy in the Brazilian congress. In the House, he stood out in two important Parliamentary Committees of Inquiry (CPI): the PC Farias and Budget. In 1994, Mercadante waived probable re-election to his seat in the House of Representatives and ran for vice president under Lula.

In 1996 he coordinated the government program of the PT and was a candidate for deputy mayor of São Paulo on Luiza Erundina's ticket. He was a protagonist in the national economic debate, attending lectures and publishing articles proposing an alternative model of development. This period resulted in the launch of the book "The Post-Real Brazil".

In 1998, Mercadante returned to the Chamber of Deputies with the third most votes in the legislative body with 241,559 votes. In his second term, he attended several specialized committees on the economy, finances and the tax system. He chaired the Committee on the Economy, Trade and Industry (1999), was the leader of the PT's Bench (2000) and member of committees on Foreign Relations and National Defence and Finance and Taxation (2001). When running for a Senate seat in 2002, Mercadante received the second-highest vote in the history of Brazilian elections – 10,497,348, a record only surpassed by Aloysio Nunes, from the PSDB, who won 11,182,669 votes in the 2010 elections. In the Senate, he held the leadership of the government caucus until June 2006.

In 2006 he was a candidate for governor of São Paulo by the PT when he got the most votes within the state party internal elections- 6,771,582 votes. That he published a book: "Brazil – First Time", an analysis of the Lula government as the first socialist government of Brazil. From 2007 to 2008, he chaired the Economic Affairs Commission (EAC) of the Senate.

During the impeachment of Senator Renan Calheiros (PMDB-AL), Mercadante advocated combining all the accusations into a single trial, in an open session in the Senate. In his speech, he argued: "My vote was not a failure, as some have said. It was a transparent vote, of someone who believes that the correct judgment on the merits of the question can only be made based on the complete judicial process".

In January 2009, Mercadante was elected leader of the PT caucus in the Senate. On 20 August 2009, he announced his resignation from the leadership position because of the party's decision to support closing the investigation by the Ethics Committee against the President of the Senate, José Sarney. The next day, however, in a speech in the Senate, after a long night of talks with President Lula, he announced that – against the wishes of his family – he had accepted the request of the president that he continue as the Party's leader in the chamber.

In 2010, he ran as PT's candidate for governor of São Paulo: however, he was defeated in the first round by Geraldo Alckmin. Mercadante was invited to join the cabinet of President Dilma Rousseff as Minister of Science, Technology and Innovation in 2011. On 18 January 2012, he was invited to assume the Ministry of Education due to the departure of the prior minister, Fernando Haddad, to run for mayor of São Paulo.

== See also ==
- List of Senators of São Paulo

Political offices
Preceded by Gleisi Hoffmann	Chief of Staff of the Presidency; 2014–2015	Succeeded by Jaques Wagner
Government offices
Preceded by Gustavo Montezano	Chair of the Brazilian Development Bank; 2023–present	Incumbent
Order of precedence
Preceded by Tarciana Medeiros as Chairwoman of Bank of Brazil	Brazilian order of precedence 53rd in line as Chairman of the Brazilian Development Bank	Followed by Robinson Sakiyama as Secretary of Federal Revenue Service
