= Nelson Barbosa =

Brazilian economist and politician

- Barbosa in 2015

Minister of Finance
- In office 21 December 2015 – 12 May 2016
- President: Dilma Rousseff
- Preceded by: Joaquim Levy
- Succeeded by: Henrique Meirelles

Minister of Planning, Budget and Management
- In office 1 January 2015 – 18 December 2015
- President: Dilma Rousseff
- Preceded by: Miriam Belchior
- Succeeded by: Moysés Simão

Personal details
- Born: 17 November 1969 (age 56) Rio de Janeiro, Guanabara, Brazil
- Education: Federal University of Rio de Janeiro; The New School
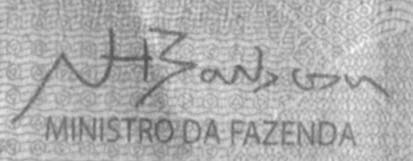
- Signature

Nelson Henrique Barbosa Filho (born 17 November 1969) is a Brazilian economist and professor of economics. From 21 December 2015 to 12 May 2016, he was Brazil's Minister of Finance.

Barbosa holds a full professorship at the São Paulo School of Economics of the Getulio Vargas Foundation and is adjunct professor at the Federal University of Rio de Janeiro as well as Researcher at IBRE/FGV and a member of the boards of CETIP and Regional Bank of Brasilia (BRB).

Barbosa holds a PhD in Economics ("Essays on Structuralist Macroeconomics", 2001) from the New School for Social Research in New York City and a master's degree and BA in Economics from the Federal University of Rio de Janeiro.

Barbosa served as Executive Secretary at Brazil's Ministry of Finance from 2011 to 2013. Prior to that, Mr Barbosa held several positions within the federal government. He was Secretary for Economic Issues (2007–2008) and Deputy Secretary for Economic Policy at the Ministry of Finance. He was also the chairman at Bank of Brazil (2009–2013), and a member of the board of Vale SA (2011–2013). His experiences within the government level includes positions at the Central Bank of Brazil (1994–1997), National Development Bank (2005–2006) and Ministry of Planning (2003).

Barbosa was invited by president Dilma Rousseff to join her economic team as Minister of Planning in her second term, having held this position from 1 January 2014 to 18 December 2015 when he replaced Joaquim Levy as Brazil's Minister of Finance.

Political offices
Preceded by Miriam Belchior	Minister of Planning, Budget and Management; 2015	Succeeded by Moysés Simão
Preceded by Joaquim Levy	Minister of Finances; 2015–2016	Succeeded by Henrique Meirelles
