= Dyogo Henrique de Oliveira =

Brazilian politician

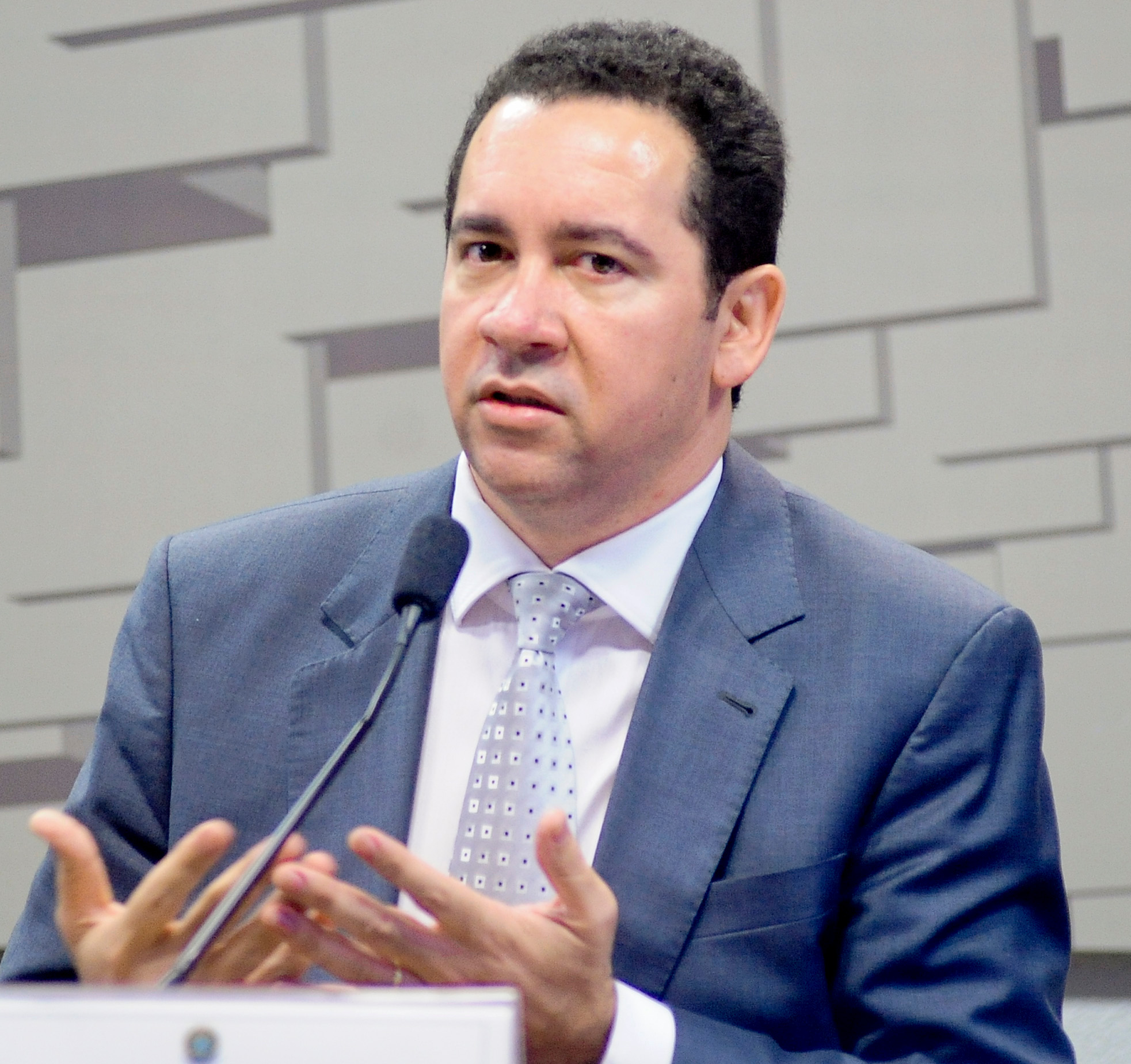

Chair of the Brazilian Development Bank
- In office 9 April 2018 – 7 January 2019
- Appointed by: Michel Temer
- Preceded by: Paulo Rabello de Castro
- Succeeded by: Joaquim Levy

Minister of Planning, Budget and Management
- In office 31 May 2016 – 9 April 2018
- President: Michel Temer
- Preceded by: Romero Jucá
- Succeeded by: Esteves Colnago

Personal details
- Born: Dyogo Henrique de Oliveira; 29 May 1975 (age 51) Araguaína, Tocantins, Brazil
- Education: Getulio Vargas Foundation (FGV); University of Brasília (UnB)
- Occupation: Economist

Dyogo Henrique de Oliveira (born 29 May 1975) is a Brazilian economist and former minister of Planning, Budget and Management in the government of Michel Temer, who assumed the office temporarily after the departure of senator Romero Jucá. In 31 March 2017, he was confirmed as minister. In March 2018, Oliveira was confirmed by president Temer as the new president of the Brazilian Development Bank (BNDES).

Political offices
Preceded by Romero Jucá	Minister of Planning, Budget and Management; 2016–2018	Succeeded by Esteves Colnago
Business positions
Preceded by Paulo Rabello de Castro	President of BNDES; 2018–present	Succeeded by Joaquim Levy
