= Marcos Lisboa =

Brazilian economist (born 1964)

- Lisboa in 2018

Secretary of Economic Policy of the Ministry of Finance
- In office 1 January 2003 – 16 May 2005
- Minister: Antonio Palocci
- Preceded by: Arno Meyer
- Succeeded by: Bernard Appy

Personal details
- Born: Marcos de Barros Lisboa; 2 August 1964 (age 62) Rio de Janeiro, Rio de Janeiro, Brazil
- Education: Federal University of Rio de Janeiro (B.Ec, M.Ec); University of Pennsylvania (PhD)
- Profession: Economist

Marcos de Barros Lisboa (born 2 August 1964) is a Brazilian economist, journalist, and professor who held the presidency of Insper, a private nonprofit higher education institution.

From 2003 to 2005, he served as Secretary of Economic Policy at the Ministry of Finance under the first Lula administration. Lisboa also served as executive director and vice president of Itaú Unibanco between 2006 and 2009. A columnist for Folha de S.Paulo, he was an assistant professor at Stanford University and Fundação Getulio Vargas.
