= Romero Jucá =

Brazilian politician (born 1954)

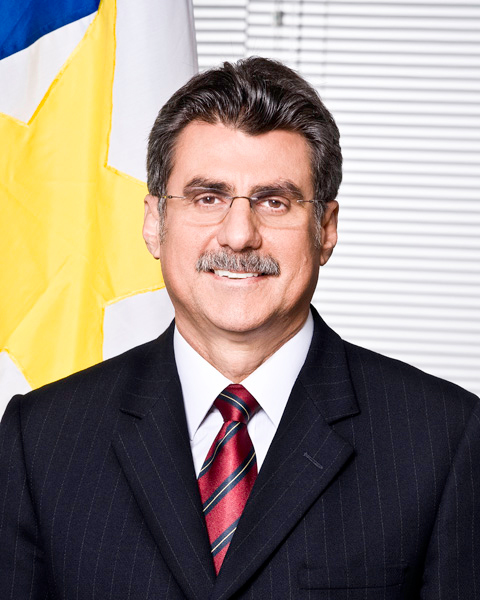

Senator from Roraima
- In office 1 February 1995 – 1 February 2019

President of the Brazilian Democratic Movement
- In office 5 April 2016 – 6 October 2019
- Preceded by: Michel Temer
- Succeeded by: Baleia Rossi

Minister of Planning, Budget and Management
- In office 12 May 2016 – 23 May 2016
- President: Michel Temer
- Preceded by: Valdir Simão
- Succeeded by: Dyogo Oliveira

Minister of Social Security
- In office 22 March 2005 – 21 July 2005
- President: Luiz Inácio Lula da Silva
- Preceded by: Amir Lando
- Succeeded by: Nelson Machado

1st Governor of Roraima
- In office 15 September 1988 – 31 December 1991
- Preceded by: Roberto Pinheiro Klein
- Succeeded by: Ottomar Pinto

Personal details
- Born: 30 November 1954 (age 71) Recife, Pernambuco, Brazil
- Party: MDB (2003–present)
- Other political affiliations: MDB (1979–1980); PMDB (1980–1990); PDS (1990–1993); PPR (1993–1995); PSDB (1995–2002)
- Spouses: Germana de Holanda Menezes (div.); Teresa Surita (div.); Rosilene Brito (m. 2015)
- Children: 4
- Profession: Economist

Romero Jucá Filho (Brazilian Portuguese: [ʁõˈmɛɾu ʒuˈka]; born 30 November 1954) is a Brazilian politician and economist. He represented Roraima in the Federal Senate for 24 years, from 1995 to 2019. Previously, he was governor of Roraima from 1988 to 1990. He is a member of MDB. On 5 April 2016, he became the president of the MDB, succeeding Michel Temer.

In the past, Jucá and other family members were the owners of two television stations in Roraima, TV Caburaí and TV Imperial.

== Secret recording ==
On 23 May 2016, a secret recording emerged of minister Jucá, who is under investigation in the multibillion-dollar kickback scheme at state oil company Petrobras, discussing a purported pact to stall a huge corruption probe that has engulfed much of the nation. The secret tape also revealed him plotting to topple President Rousseff. After the newspaper O Globo, highly critical of Rousseff, posted an editorial urging the interim president to fire his right-hand man, Temer accepted the temporary departure of his minister.

Political offices
Preceded by Valdir Simão	Minister of Planning, Budget and Management; 2016	Succeeded by Dyogo Henrique de Oliveira
Preceded by Amir Lando	Minister of Social Security; 2005	Succeeded by Nelson Machado
Preceded by Roberto Pinheiro Klen	Governor of Roraima; 1988–1991	Succeeded by Ottomar Pinto
Party political offices
Preceded by Michel Temer	President of Brazilian Democratic Movement; 2016–2019	Succeeded by Baleia Rossi
