= Alice Piffer Canabrava =

Brazilian historian (1911-2003)

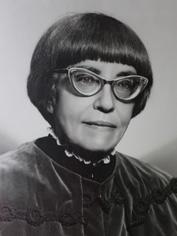
- Born: October 22, 1911; Araras, SP, Brazil
- Died: 2003 (aged 91–92); São Paulo, SP, Brazil
- Education: University of São Paulo
- Occupations: Historian, academic

Alice Piffer Canabrava (Araras, SP, Brazil, October 22, 1911 – São Paulo, SP, Brazil, February 2003) was a Brazilian economic historian and academic.

== Life and career ==
Alice Piffer Canabrava was born in Araras, SP, a region, at the time, dedicated to coffee farms. Her parents cultivated values of education and work for women. Her mother, Otília Piffer, a piano teacher born in Austria who was accustomed to hard labour and who didn't see why women had to abstain from studying and working. Her father, Clementino Canabrava, owner of a medium-sized farm, was an intellectual and well read man who did not admit female inferiority in relation to intellectual tasks.

Canabrava studied at a normal school in the city of São Paulo and after graduating taught in primary schools in the inner cities of São Paulo state. Even though she had a great interest in literacy, Canabrava wished to expand her cultural horizons. In 1935, she enrolled at the São Paulo University to study History and Geography, graduating in 1937. Her dedication to her studies rendered her an invitation to stay on as an assistant professor in History.

In 1942, she defended her doctoral thesis, "Portuguese trade in Rio da Prata, 1580-1640", revealing the clandestine routes through which Potosi's silver flowed to Brazil. Even though it was not the first study in Brazilian economic history, it was considered one of the pioneers in the field, introducing new research methods and techniques, and praised by national and international critics.

In 1946, Canabrava defended her habilitation thesis "The sugar industry in the Antilhas British and French islands, 1697-1755". Running for a tenure professorship position against a male colleague, she recalled a great resistance from her colleagues in the evaluation committee, who did not give her the title for being a woman even though she had higher scores. Claiming gender discrimination, Canabrava quit her position at the School of Philosophy, Sciences and Languages, transferring to the newly created School of Economical and Administrative Sciences. She became full professor in 1951 in General Economic History and Economic Development of Brazil, becoming the first woman to obtain that title at the University of São Paulo.

She held many important positions at the School of Economical and Administrative Sciences, serving as department director between 1954 and 1957; head of the Cultural Sciences department; president of the curating council and member of the deliberative council of the Fundação Instituto de Pesquisas Econômicas.

Alice Canabrava was one of the founders of the National Association of University History Professors (Associação Nacional de Professores Universitários de História) the creator of the Revista Brasileira de História. She was a member of the Association of Brazilian Geographers (Associação dos Geógrafos Brasileiros), the Paulista Association of Historic Studies (Associação Paulista de Estudos Históricos) and the Historic and Geographic Institute of São Paulo (Instituto Histórico e Geográfico de São Paulo).

Alice continued her research and teaching career until 1981, when she was compulsorily retired. She published important papers in the field of quantitative history and gained national and international notoriety in the field.
