= Banco Patagonia =

Argentine commercial bank

Banco Patagonia S.A.

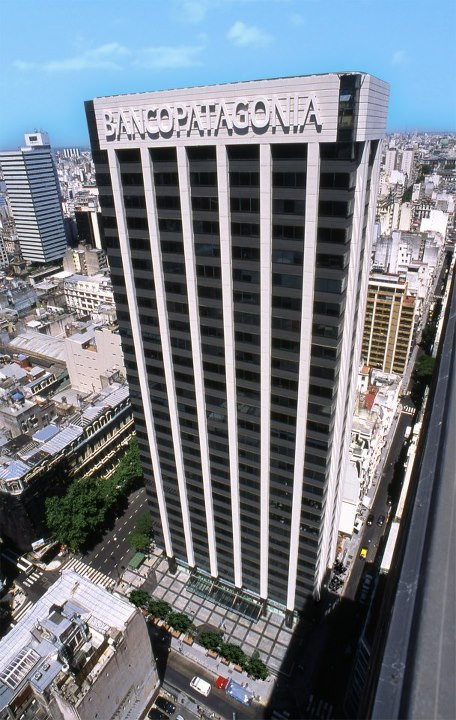
- Banco Patagonia headquarters
- Type: Sociedad Anónima
- Traded as: BCBA: BPAT
- Industry: Finance and Insurance
- Founded: 1976; 50 years ago
- Headquarters: Buenos Aires, Argentina
- Key people: Jorge Guillermo Stuart Milne, (Chairman)
- Products: Banking
- Revenue: ▲$12.344M (2015)
- Net income: ▲$2.406M (2015)
- Total assets: ▲$59.971M (2015)
- Owner: Banco do Brasil; ANSES (18.46%)
- Number of employees: 3361
- Parent: Banco do Brasil
- Website: bancopatagonia.com.ar

Banco Patagonia is an Argentine commercial bank headquartered in Buenos Aires, and has 200 service points located in the main cities and capitals of the provinces of Argentina. The company operates in the individual, as well as small and medium-sized business banking segments, and has currently more than 775,000 clients.

Banco Patagonia provides various financial services, including personal banking, corporate banking, investments, insurance, and international banking.

Banco Patagonia was established as a brokerage house in 1976. The first group of shareholders included the brothers Jorge and Ricardo Stuart Milne and Emilio González Moreno. Following its entry into the auto loan sector in 1987, it became a commercial bank (Banco Mildesa) in 1988. Mildes grew with the 1996 acquisition of the newly privatized Banco de Río Negro, and was renamed after the latter province's region of Patagonia, in 2000.

Patagonia acquired the insolvent Banco Sudameris (whose portfolio included the Caja de Ahorro, the nation's largest savings and loan), in 2003. Absorbing Lloyds TSB's Argentine operations in 2004, it grew to become one of the 15 largest banks in Argentina and has branches in Brazil and Uruguay. Banco Patagonia is listed on the Buenos Aires Stock Exchange and has already been listed on the BM&F Bovespa, in São Paulo.

It is owned by Banco do Brasil, the second-largest bank in Latin America. Banco do Brasil holds 58.96% of the shares of Banco Patagonia.

According to the reports in July 2019, Banco Patagonia received the Best Bank award in the 15th edition of the Fortuna Awards for the Best and Largest Companies 2019.
