= TV Imperial =

Boa Vista, Roraima; Brazil
- Channels: Digital: 34 (UHF); Virtual: 6

Programming
- Affiliations: Record

Ownership
- Owner: Grupo Égia de Comunicação; (TV Imperial Sociedade Limitada)
- Sister stations: Rádio 93 FM

History
- First air date: November 26, 1991
- Former channel numbers: Analog: 6 (VHF, 1991–2018)

Technical information
- Licensing authority: ANATEL
- ERP: 3.6 kW
- Transmitter coordinates: 02°50′18.1″S 60°40′02.4″W

Links
- Public license information: Profile
- Website: record.r7.com/record-emissoras/norte/tv-imperial/

TV Imperial (channel 6) is a Brazilian television station serving as the affiliate of the Record television network for the state of Roraima. Based in Boa Vista, the station is owned by the Grupo Égia de Comunicação as its sole television property, which also includes Rádio 93 FM, with wide coverage in the state. The station has modern equipment and a qualified team to produce local content. The station was formerly owned by Romero Jucá and other members of his family.

== History ==
Before the end of 1991, TV Imperial was installed in record time, between concession and operation it took just 50 days, until then the other channels took an average of 18 months to enter into experimental operation. With its own headquarters and equipment, TV Imperial began airing on VHF channel 6 as an affiliate of Rede Record, one of the first in the early days of the Macedo administration.

In 2010, the broadcaster obtained four new concessions to expand and retransmit signals to the interior, in the months of February, September, October and November, during the election period.

In December 2012, the station carried out the Imperial Solidário project.

In November 2020, TV Imperial was acquired by businessman André Felipe de Brito Pereira Costa.

On July 11, 2024, the Jucá family, represented by businesswoman Rosilene Brito, wife of former senator Romero Jucá, formed Grupo Égia de Comunicação, integrating TV Imperial, Rádio 93 FM and the Roraima em Tempo web portal. Rosilene Brito took the role of director-general of the group.

== Technical information ==
Virtual channel	Digital channel	Screen	Content
6.1	34 UHF	1080i	TV Imperial/Record's main schedule

Based on the federal decree transitioning Brazilian TV stations from analogue to digital signals, TV Imperial, as well as the other broadcasters in Boa Vista, ceased broadcasting on VHF channel 6 on October 31, 2018, following the official ANATEL timeline.
