= Rabello de Castro =

Paulo Rabello de Castro
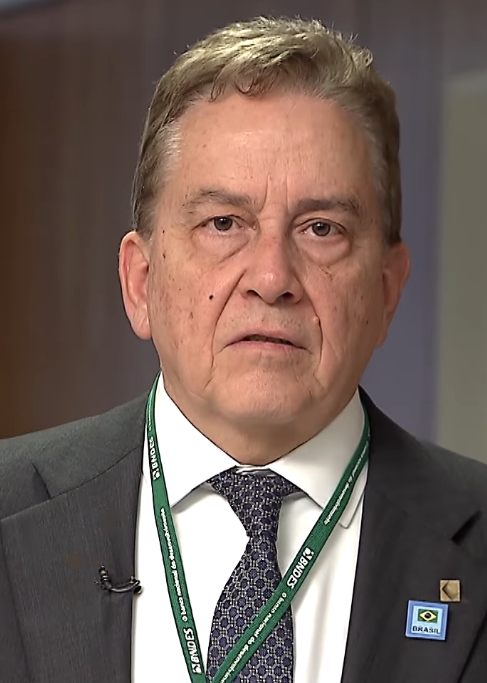

Chair of the Brazilian Development Bank
- In office 1 June 2017 – 9 April 2018
- Appointed by: Michel Temer
- Preceded by: Maria Silvia
- Succeeded by: Dyogo Oliveira

Chair of the Brazilian Institute of Geography and Statistics
- In office 22 June 2016 – 1 June 2017
- Appointed by: Michel Temer
- Preceded by: Wasmália Bivar
- Succeeded by: Roberto Olinto

Personal details
- Born: Paulo Rabello de Castro; 4 January 1949 (age 77) Rio de Janeiro, Brazil
- Party: PSD (2020–present)
- Other political affiliations: PSC (2017–2020)
- Education: Federal University of Rio de Janeiro (UFRJ); State University of Rio de Janeiro (UERJ)
- Profession: Economist

Paulo Rabello de Castro (born 4 January 1949) is a Brazilian economist, incumbent president of the Brazilian Development Bank (BNDES). He was also the president of Brazilian Institute of Geography and Statistics (IBGE). For both offices, Rabello was appointed by president Michel Temer.

On 18 November 2017, he was launched by the Social Christian Party (PSC) as pre-candidate for President of Brazil in the 2018 elections. The party wants to spread an image of liberal Christians by using the economist as a reference. His candidacy was confirmed in the party's convention on 20 July 2018. However, Rabello stepped down and the party nominated him vice presidential candidate along with Senator Alvaro Dias.

== Bibliography ==
- "Most widely held works by Paulo Rabello de Castro". WorldCat.
- Paulo Rabello de Castro (1982). Barões & bóias-frias: repensando a questão agrária no Brasil. Asociação Promotora de Estudos da Economia.
- Paulo Rabello de Castro (2014). O mito do governo grátis: o mal das políticas econômicas ilusórias e as lições de 13 países para o Brasil mudar. Edições de Janeiro. ISBN 978-85-67854-30-4.
- Paulo Rabello De Castro; Raul Velloso (3 November 2016). Box - Panorama Fiscal Brasileiro proposta De Açao. Instituto Atlantico. ISBN 978-85-62215-02-5.

Party political offices
Preceded by Leonardo Gadelha	PSC nominee for Vice President of Brazil; 2018	Most recent
Business positions
Preceded by Maria Silvia Bastos Marques	President of BNDES; 2017–2018	Succeeded by Dyogo Henrique de Oliveira
Government offices
Preceded by Wasmália Bivar	President of IBGE; 2016–2017	Succeeded by Roberto Olinto
