= Joaquim Levy =

Brazilian economist

- Levy in 2019

Chair of the Brazilian Development Bank
- In office 7 January 2019 – 16 June 2019
- Appointed by: Jair Bolsonaro
- Preceded by: Dyogo Oliveira
- Succeeded by: Gustavo Montezano

Minister of Finance
- In office 1 January 2015 – 21 December 2015
- President: Dilma Rousseff
- Preceded by: Guido Mantega
- Succeeded by: Nelson Barbosa

Secretary of the National Treasury
- In office 1 January 2003 – 27 March 2006
- President: Luiz Inácio Lula da Silva
- Preceded by: Eduardo Guardia
- Succeeded by: Carlos Kawall

Personal details
- Born: 17 February 1961 (age 65) Rio de Janeiro, Brazil
- Education: Federal University of Rio de Janeiro; Getúlio Vargas Foundation; University of Chicago
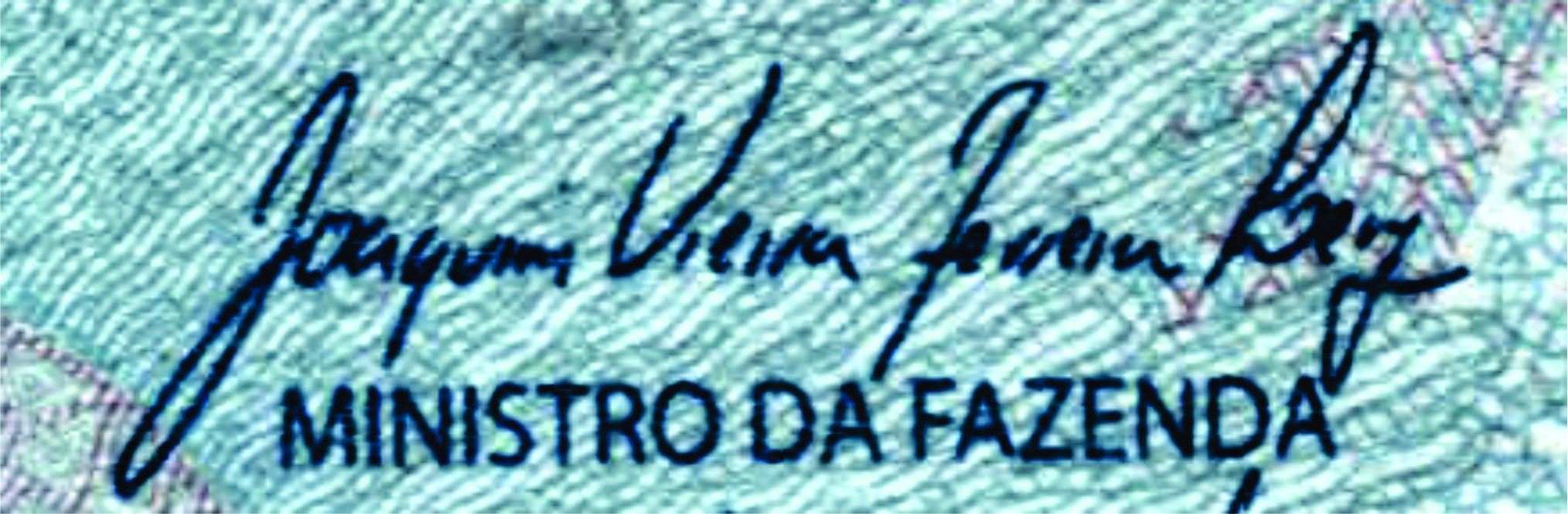
- Signature

Joaquim Vieira Ferreira Levy (born February 17, 1961) is a Brazilian economist and Brazil's former Finance Minister. Levy took office on January 1, 2015, during the presidential inauguration of Dilma Rousseff's second term. He also was president of the Brazilian Development Bank (BNDES).

Prior to the appointment, Levy was the President of Bradesco Asset Management, a division of Bradesco, Brazil's second-largest private bank.

== Life and education ==
Born in Rio de Janeiro, Brazil, Levy holds a PhD in economics from the University of Chicago (1992), a Master's in economics from Getúlio Vargas Foundation (FGV) (1987), and graduated in Naval Architecture and Marine Engineering from the Federal University of Rio de Janeiro.

== Career ==
=== Early career ===
Levy was a professor of economics at FGV in the 1990s, before joining the IMF, where he worked from 1992 to 1999. At the IMF Levy held several positions in the Western Hemisphere Department (1992), Europe I Department (1993-97), Capital Markets, and Research (1997–98). Levy was also vice-president at the Inter-American Development Bank and Finance Secretary of the State of Rio de Janeiro, during the first administration of Governor Sérgio Cabral Filho.

Between 1999 and 2000, Levy was a visiting economist at the European Central Bank, having worked in the division of Capital Markets and Monetary Strategy.

In 2000 Levy was appointed Deputy Secretary of Economic Policy at Brazil's Ministry of Finance, and in 2001 became Chief Economist at Brazil's Ministry of Planning, Budget, and Management. In January 2003, he was appointed Treasury Secretary (an officer that in Brazil serves under the Minister of Finance) by president Luiz Inácio Lula da Silva, an office he held until 2006. He helped Brazil obtain its investment grade credit rating by checking spending and overhauling its debt structure.

From 2007 to 2010 Levy served as Finance Secretary of the State of Rio de Janeiro, under Governor Sérgio Cabral.

=== Career in the private sector ===
From 2010 to November 2014, Levy was the President of Bradesco Asset Management, an asset arm of the Brazilian giant financial conglomerate Bradesco, with more than US$130 billion under management. Levy left Bradesco at the invitation from Dilma Rousseff to assume the Ministry of Finance.

=== Minister of Finance, 2014–2015 ===
On November 27, 2014, president Dilma Rousseff named Levy as the country's Finance Minister for her second term, replacing Guido Mantega. Levy took office as Finance Minister on January 1, 2015.

=== World Bank, 2016–2018 ===
On January 11, 2016, World Bank Group president Jim Yong Kim named Levy as the bank's Chief Financial Officer, replacing Bertrand Badre. Levy's appointment at the World Bank Group was effective February 1, 2016. As former managing director and World Bank Group Chief Financial Officer , Levy was responsible for the financial and risk management strategies of the World Bank Group and for the institutions that make up the Group. This included development of new, innovative financial products and services, oversight of the financial reporting, risk management, and mobilization of financial resources in alignment with the Group's strategy.

=== Brazilian Development Bank, 2018–2019 ===
In November 2018, it was announced that Levy was chosen by the team of President-elect Jair Bolsonaro to become the next president of the Brazilian Development Bank (BNDES). On 16 June 2019, Levy left the presidency of the bank after a controversy between President Bolsonaro and the nominee for director of the bank's Capital Market, Marcos Barbosa Pinto, who was Chief of Staff of Demian Fiocca, former president of BNDES during the government of former President Lula.

== Other activities ==
In June 2021, Levy was appointed to the World Bank–International Monetary Fund High-Level Advisory Group (HLAG) on Sustainable and Inclusive Recovery and Growth, co-chaired by Mari Pangestu, Ceyla Pazarbasioglu, and Nicholas Stern.

Government offices
Preceded by Dyogo Henrique de Oliveira	President of the Brazilian Development Bank; 2019	Succeeded by Gustavo Montezano
Political offices
Preceded by Guido Mantega	Minister of Finance; 2015	Succeeded by Nelson Barbosa
