= Brazilian tax reform =

Measure to change tax collection in Brazil

The Brazilian tax reform, introduced by Constitutional Amendment No. 132, is an ongoing measure intended to change the collection of taxes in Brazil. It represents an attempt to implement significant instruments for economic policy, with the aim of providing benefits both for the population and for companies in operation. The tax reform, approved in 2023 and still in the process of implementation, seeks to simplify the procedures for payment and collection of taxes, fees and contributions at the federal, state and municipal levels.

At the core of the reform is the creation of a dual VAT system, which will replace five existing taxes—PIS, Cofins, IPI, ICMS, and ISS—with two new levies: the CBS (Contribuição sobre Bens e Serviços), a federal tax, and the IBS (Imposto sobre Bens e Serviços), managed jointly by states and municipalities. This restructuring aims to simplify and modernize Brazil's indirect tax system, aligning it with international best practices and promoting greater economic efficiency, legal certainty, and competitiveness. Both taxes are designed to be non-cumulative, meaning they apply only to the value added at each stage of production, eliminating the "cascading" tax-on-tax effect common under the old system. The transition is being implemented gradually: it will take place between 2026 and 2033, a period during which the new taxes will coexist with the old ones, which will be progressively reduced until their extinction.

The year 2026 serves as a testing phase, with a combined trial rate of 1% (0.9% CBS and 0.1% IBS) that does not represent an effective increase in the tax burden, as it is offset against existing PIS and Cofins payments. Other notable features include a shift to taxing consumption at the point where goods and services are consumed rather than where they are produced, and the planned adoption of a split payment mechanism, under which taxes are automatically withheld at the moment of payment.

== History ==
Several different proposals for a Brazilian tax reform were presented over the years, with the one based on Constitutional Amendment Bill (PEC) 45/2019 ultimately being approved (later converted into Constitutional Amendment No. 132/2023):

- PEC 175/1995
- PEC 41/2003
- PEC 293/2004
- PEC 31/2007
- PEC 233/2008
- PEC 45/2019

=== Proposal in Lula's first government ===
The tax reform has been under discussion in the National Congress since 2003, when President Luiz Inácio Lula da Silva submitted Constitutional Amendment Bill 41/03. This proposal was approved in the same year as Constitutional Amendment 42 and introduced several changes to the national tax system. The amendment determined that 25% of the revenue from the Contribution for Intervention in the Economic Domain (Cide) would be shared with the states, the Federal District and municipalities, and introduced the noventena (ninety-day rule) as a requirement for tax collection. In addition, it extended the validity of the CPMF and of the Desvinculação de Receitas da União (DRU, "Disentailment of Federal Revenues") until 2007, which allowed 20% of federal revenue to be used freely.

The amendment established that 25% of the revenue collected through the Contribuição de Intervenção no Domínio Econômico (Cide) would be shared with the states, the Federal District and municipalities. It also introduced the noventena rule for the collection of taxes. In addition, it extended the CPMF and the Desvinculação de Receitas da União (DRU) until 2007, which allowed 20% of federal revenue to be used in a flexible manner.

With regard to the Rural Land Tax (ITR), which is the responsibility of the federal government, it was established that municipalities may choose to receive all of the revenue related to properties located in their territory, provided that they assume responsibility for the collection and supervision of the tax. If they choose to leave this responsibility with the federal government, they receive 50% of the revenue.

As for the Tax on the Circulation of Goods and Services (ICMS), a state value-added tax on the circulation of goods and services, an exemption from the tax was introduced for free-to-air broadcasting services.

=== PEC 293/2004 ===
PEC 293/04 sets limits and criteria for calculating the national tax burden, taking into account tax revenues collected by the states and municipalities, gross domestic product and public debt. The proposal prohibits the federal government from levying taxes on the import of works by Brazilian artists, even when produced abroad, and also on works by foreign artists that deal with Brazilian themes. In addition, the PEC removes from the federal government the power to levy taxes on forests and other forms of natural vegetation deemed to be of permanent preservation. Finally, the proposal creates a minimum income programme to ensure that low-income families can meet their basic subsistence needs.

== Constitutional Amendment No. 132 of 2023 ==
Promulgated on 20 December 2023, it was the first broad reform of the national tax system carried out under the 1988 Federal Constitution, after 30 years of discussion. Among the changes made is the unification of five taxes — ICMS, ISS, IPI, PIS and Cofins — into a single levy, which will be split between the federal level (CBS: Contribution on Goods and Services) and the subnational level (IBS: Tax on Goods and Services). Both are value-added taxes (VATs), allowing for the end of cascading taxation and tax cumulativitiy.

The proposal originated with PEC 45/2019, which began its passage in the Chamber of Deputies. Approval in the Chamber took place on 7 July 2023, after which the text was sent to the Senate and approved there, with amendments, on 8 November. The final version of the text was voted on in the Chamber of Deputies on 15 December 2023.

The reform also created a selective tax (IS) to discourage the consumption of products harmful to health and the environment. It also approved the exemption of all taxes levied on foodstuffs included in the National Basic Food Basket and a cashback model through which low-income families will receive a refund of part of the taxes paid.

One of the drafters of the proposal was the extraordinary secretary for Tax Reform, Bernard Appy.

=== Transition ===
The transition period for unifying the taxes is expected to last up to seven years, between 2026 and 2032. The current taxes are to be abolished by 2033.

In 2027, the Selective Tax is to enter into force, the PIS, the Cofins and the Tax on Financial Operations (IOF/Insurance) will be abolished, and the rates of the Tax on Industrialized Products (IPI) will be reduced to zero throughout the country, except for products whose industrialisation is incentivised in the Manaus Free Trade Zone (ZFM).

=== Regulation ===
The first regulatory bill for the tax reform (Complementary Bill 68/24) was approved by the Chamber of Deputies on 10 July 2024. It defines the foodstuffs in the national basic food basket that will be exempt from tax and the mechanisms of cashback for low-income families, as well as rules for levying the three consumption taxes (IBS, CBS and Selective Tax). The text was then sent to the Senate, where it was approved on 12 December 2024. It returned to the Chamber, which approved the bill on 17 December. On 16 January 2025, Complementary Law No. 214/2025 was signed into law.

On 13 August 2024, the Chamber approved the basic text of the second regulatory bill (Complementary Bill 108/24), setting out rules for the composition of the management committee of the new taxes and rules on the taxation of inheritances in specific situations. On 30 October, the Chamber completed the vote, rejecting both the introduction of a tax on large fortunes and the levying of the Tax on Inheritance and Donations (ITCMD) on inheritances from private pension plans. The text was then sent to the Senate.

=== Rates and exemptions ===
The approved amendment provides for a 60% reduction in tax rates for 13 sectors, such as education, health, medicines, public passenger transport, personal hygiene and cleaning products, agricultural products and others.

Some types of products and services may receive specific treatment in the application of the VATs, with changes to the tax base and tax rates, to be defined in a complementary law.

Exemptions from the VATs are also planned for a series of goods and services, to be defined in a complementary law. Every five years, the maintenance of these benefits must be re-evaluated.

Among the products and services that will be subject to higher taxation under the Selective Tax (IS) are: sugary drinks; alcoholic beverages; boats and aircraft; cars, including electric vehicles; physical and online betting; and the extraction of iron ore, oil and natural gas.

A new figure, the nanoempreendedor ("nanoentrepreneur"), was created and will be exempt from the new consumption taxes. This category covers natural persons whose annual gross revenue is less than R$40,500 (half the limit for individual microentrepreneurs).

If the overall rate exceeds 26.5% at the end of the transition period, the federal government must submit a bill to the National Congress to adjust taxation to that level. Every five years, the reform's rules must be evaluated.

=== Income and wealth ===
In relation to the taxation of income and wealth, the reform expanded the scope of the Tax on Motor Vehicle Ownership (IPVA) to include private jets, yachts and speedboats, except for aircraft used in agricultural services.

A progressive structure was established for the Tax on Inheritance and Donations (ITCMD), based on the value of the inheritance or donation. It will be collected in the jurisdiction of the deceased person's domicile.

Real estate transactions will be subject to CBS and IBS. There will be an exemption for natural persons who earn less than R$240,000 per year from rental income.

A "social reducer" was created, to be applied to the purchase of residential properties and plots of land and to residential leases, reducing the tax base in order to benefit lower-income families and low-value housing. There will be a 50% reduction in the IBS and CBS rates on all transactions involving real estate, and a 70% reduction on transactions involving leasing, onerous assignment and rental of property.

=== Funds ===
A Regional Development Fund (FDR) is to be created with the aim of reducing regional and social inequalities, distributing federal resources to the states and the Federal District. These funds are to be used primarily to promote environmental sustainability and reduce carbon emissions.

A compensation fund is also to be created to compensate natural and legal persons that lose tax benefits granted up to 31 May 2023 and guaranteed until 2032. As from 2026, the federal government will have to compensate any loss of revenue resulting from the creation of the VAT in the states and municipalities.

=== Management Committee ===
An IBS Management Committee is to be created in order to centralise the collection of the future VAT shared between states and municipalities, as well as to distribute the amounts collected and carry out compensations.

== Tool to support companies with the new taxes ==
=== Main concerns and challenges identified by business owners and accountants regarding the reform ===
A survey covering 1,600 business owners, accountants and finance professionals from across the country indicated that 58% fear that the reform will lead to an increase in the tax burden; 19% identified the complexity of the transition rules as their main concern; and 14% highlighted negative impacts on data control and companies' cash flow.

At present, there remains a significant gap between the technical and political discourse around the reform and the practical reality of businesses. In other words, despite the public debate, in practice most companies are neither informed about nor prepared for the reform.

=== Calculation of direct price impacts ===
At the beginning of the transition, companies and accountants will have to deal with a parallel assessment model (the current system plus the new system), which requires technical, accounting and operational preparation in order to avoid errors in declaring tax liabilities. With the entry into force of the new rules of the tax reform, small and medium-sized enterprises began seeking tools to help calculate direct impacts on prices, profit margins and cash flow.

A free support tool is currently provided by Conta Azul to help entrepreneurs understand the tax impact and set prices under the new tax model.
