= Gustavo Montezano =

Brazilian economist and businessman

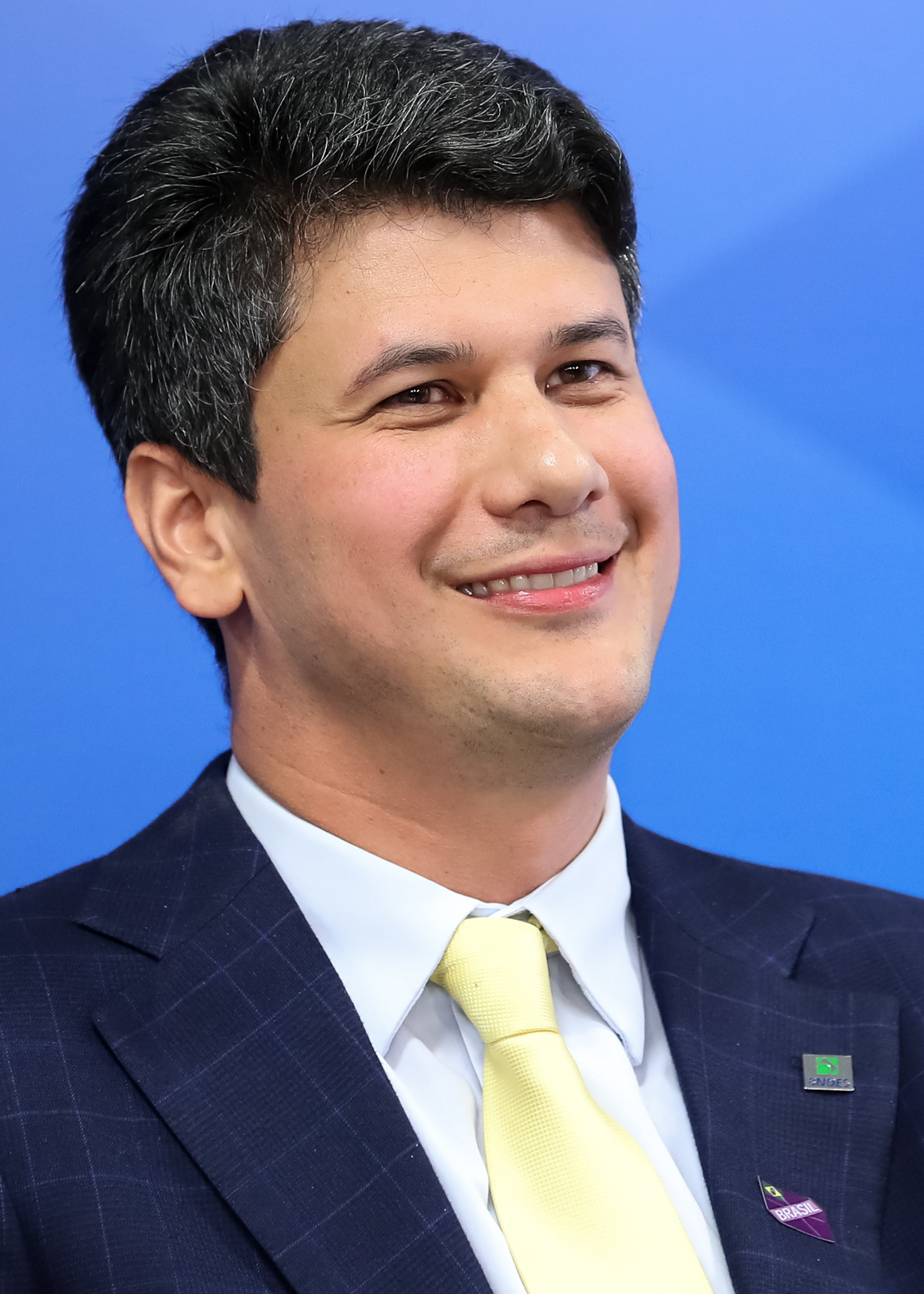

Chairman of the Brazilian Development Bank
- In office 17 June 2019 – 1 January 2023
- Appointed by: Jair Bolsonaro
- Preceded by: Joaquim Levy
- Succeeded by: Aloizio Mercadante

Personal details
- Born: Gustavo Henrique Moreira Montezano; 25 September 1980 (age 45) Rio de Janeiro, Brazil
- Education: Military Institute of Engineering (BE); Economy and Finances School of Ibmec (MEc)
- Profession: Engineer, economist

Gustavo Henrique Moreira Montezano (born 25 September 1980) is a Brazilian economist and businessman who served as the president of the Brazilian Social and Economic Development Bank from 2019 to 2023.

== Early life ==
He earned a Master of Economics at Ibmec University and Bachelor of Engineering at the Instituto Militar de Engenharia.

== Career ==
He was a partner at Banco Pactual, for which he acted as Executive Director for commodities and was previously responsible for the credit area, re-insurance, and project finance. He started his career as an analyst of Banco Opportunity in Rio de Janeiro.

=== Presidency of BNDES ===
Joaquim Levy resigned on 16 June 2019, because of a controversy involving President Jair Bolsonaro and the nominee for Director of Capital Markets, Marcos Barbosa Pinto. Marcos Barbosa Pinto was the chief of staff for Demian Fiocca, President of BNDES during the Luiz Inácio Lula da Silva administration. He was invited to serve as president of the bank.

Government offices
Preceded by Joaquim Levy	Chairman of the Brazilian Development Bank; 2019–2023	Succeeded by Aloizio Mercadante
