= Carlos Lessa =

Brazilian economist (1936–2020)

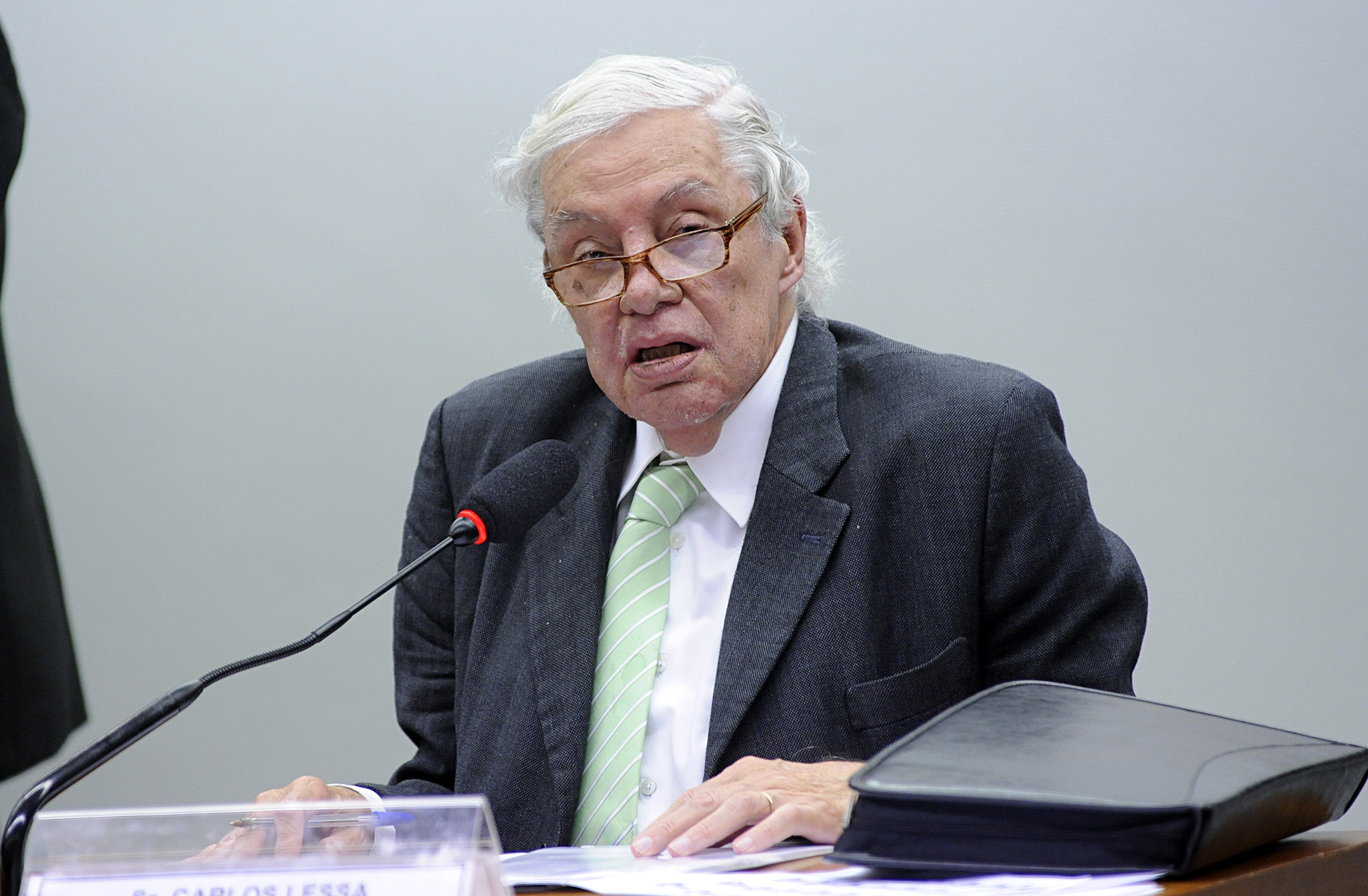

President of the Brazilian Development Bank
- In office January 2003 – November 2004
- President: Luiz Inácio Lula da Silva
- Preceded by: Eleazar de Carvalho Filho
- Succeeded by: Guido Mantega

Rector of the Federal University of Rio de Janeiro
- In office July 2002 – March 2003
- Preceded by: José Henrique Vilhena de Paiva
- Succeeded by: Sergio Eduardo Longo Fracalanzza

Personal details
- Born: July 30, 1936 Rio de Janeiro, Rio de Janeiro, Brazil
- Died: June 5, 2020 (aged 83) Rio de Janeiro, Rio de Janeiro, Brazil
- Children: Rodrigo Lessa
- Education: Federal University of Rio de Janeiro (BS); Conselho Nacional de Economia (MS); University of Campinas (DSc)
- Profession: Economist, professor

Carlos Francisco Theodoro Machado Ribeiro de Lessa, better known simply as Carlos Lessa (30 July 1936 – 5 June 2020) was a Brazilian economist and professor.

== Life and career ==
Born on 30 July 1936, in Rio de Janeiro, to a wealthy family, Lessa studied at private schools in his native city.

In 1959, he graduated in economics at the Federal University of Rio de Janeiro and later got a Master's degree at Conselho Nacional de Economia. In 1980 he finished his doctor's degree in Human sciences at University of Campinas.

Lessa worked as a professor at Federal University of Rio de Janeiro and at the Rio Branco Institute, the Brazilian diplomatic graduate school.

In 2002, Lessa was elected Rector of the Federal University of Rio de Janeiro. It was his post for a brief period of time between July 2002 and March 2003.

In 2003, Lessa was appointed President of the Brazilian Development Bank by Brazilian President Luiz Inácio Lula da Silva. His tenure lasted from January 2003 to November 2004 and his resignation was a result of multiple disagreements over economic policies with Central Bank of Brazil President Henrique Meirelles and Minister of Development, Industry and Foreign Trade Luiz Fernando Furlan

== Personal life and death ==
Lessa was a huge fan of Brazilian Carnival and founded Minerva Assanhada, a Carnival block composed mostly of Federal University of Rio de Janeiro students and personnel. Lessa's son, Rodrigo Lessa is a singer-songwriter and Multi-instrumentalist.

Lessa died from complications of COVID-19 in Rio de Janeiro on 5 June 2020, during the COVID-19 pandemic in Brazil at the age of 83.
