= Guido Mantega =

Brazilian economist and politician (born 1949)

- Mantega in 2009

Minister of Finance
- In office 27 March 2006 – 1 January 2015
- President: Luiz Inácio Lula da Silva; Dilma Rousseff
- Preceded by: Antonio Palocci
- Succeeded by: Joaquim Levy

CEO of the Brazilian Development Bank
- In office 22 November 2004 – 27 March 2006
- President: Luiz Inácio Lula da Silva
- Preceded by: Carlos Lessa
- Succeeded by: Demian Fiocca

Minister of Planning, Budget and Management
- In office 1 January 2003 – 18 November 2004
- President: Luiz Inácio Lula da Silva
- Preceded by: Guilherme Dias
- Succeeded by: Nelson Machado

Personal details
- Born: 7 April 1949 (age 77) Genoa, Liguria, Italy
- Party: Workers' Party
- Education: University of São Paulo
- Profession: Economist
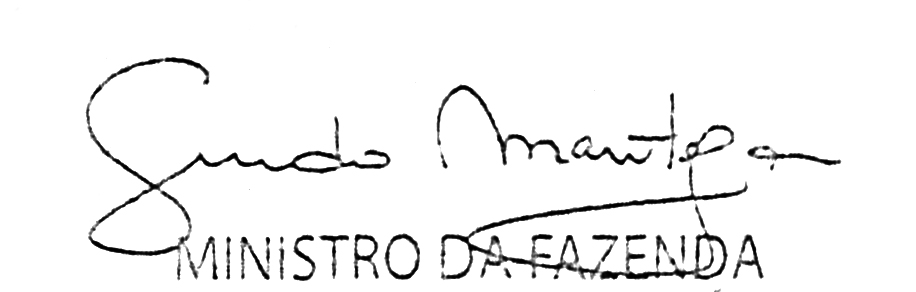
- Signature

Guido Mantega (Portuguese pronunciation: [ˈɡidu ˈmɐ̃teɡɐ]; born 7 April 1949) is an Italian-born Brazilian economist, politician, and professor. Mantega served as Minister of Finance from 2006 to 2015 under the presidencies of Luiz Inácio Lula da Silva and Dilma Rousseff. His tenure as Minister of Finance, which spanned over eight years in office, was the longest in Brazilian history.

== Early life and education ==
Mantega was born in Genoa, Italy. His family moved to Brazil in his infancy. He graduated in Economics from the School of Economics, Business and Accounting of the University of São Paulo, he holds a Ph.D. in Sociology from the University of São Paulo and has taught at several universities and institutes of São Paulo, including the Pontifical Catholic University of São Paulo and Fundação Getulio Vargas.

== Career ==
He has long been associated with the left wing Workers' Party and was a key member in the successful presidential campaign of the party's founder and leader, Luiz Inácio Lula da Silva. Upon Lula's access to power in 2003, Mantega was appointed Minister of Planning, and later chairman to BNDES (National Bank for Economical and Social Development).

On March 27, 2006 he was named Brazil's Finance Minister, replacing Antonio Palocci, who resigned in the wake of corruption charges. Mantega left office in December 2014, when he was replaced by the University of Chicago-trained economist Joaquim Levy.

In mid-2013, financial-markets commentator David Marsh wrote:

Developing-nation economic leaders such as Guido Mantega, Brazil’s outspoken finance minister — who two years ago accused the U.S. of launching “currency wars” through QE and a lower dollar, allegedly to steal a growth advantage —, have had to change their tune.

Marsh's comments came as the Federal Reserve's Ben Bernanke was beginning to explore the end of QE and one impact was a "withdrawal of liquidity" from markets such as Brazil's.

Following Lula's victory in the 2022 Brazilian presidential election, Mantega was part of his transition team before choosing to leave. In 2024, it was reported that Lula favors Mantega for the position of CEO of Brazilian mining company Vale S.A.

== Bibliography ==
- Guido Mantega; Paulo Vanuchi; Aloysio Biondi (1 January 1997). Custo Brasil: mitos e realidade. Editora Vozes. ISBN 978-85-326-1875-7.
- Guido Mantega; José Márcio Rego (1999). Conversas com economistas brasileiros II. Editora 34. ISBN 978-85-7326-146-2.

== Notes and citations ==
Government offices
Preceded by Carlos Lessa	CEO of the Brazilian Development Bank; 2004–2006	Succeeded by Demian Fiocca
Political offices
Preceded by Guilherme Dias	Minister of Planning, Budget and Management; 2003–2004	Succeeded by Nelson Machado
Preceded by Antonio Palocci	Minister of Finance; 2006–2015	Succeeded by Joaquim Levy
