= Luciano Coutinho =

Brazilian economist

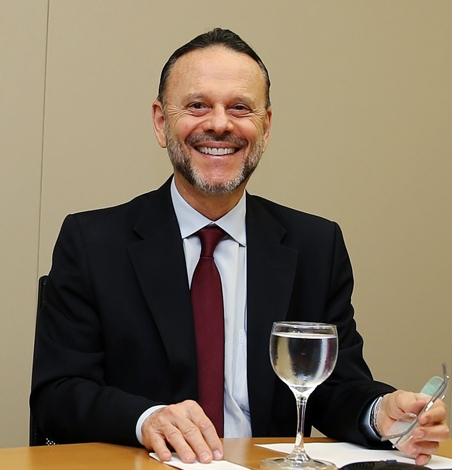
- Coutinho in 2013

President of the Brazilian Development Bank
- In office May 2007 – May 2016
- President: Luiz Inácio Lula da Silva; Dilma Rousseff
- Preceded by: Demian Fiocca
- Succeeded by: Maria Silvia Bastos Marques

Secretary-General of the Ministry of Science and Technology
- In office 1985–1988
- President: José Sarney

Personal details
- Born: Luciano Galvão Coutinho; September 1946 (age 79) Recife, Pernambuco, Brazil
- Education: University of São Paulo; Cornell University
- Occupation: Economist, academic and public official

Luciano Galvão Coutinho (born September 1946 in Recife) is a Brazilian economist and from 2007 until 2016 was the President of the Brazilian Development Bank (BNDES). Under his direction, BNDES holds over 500 billion dollars in assets.

In 2009, Dr. Coutinho has been featured in Epoca's 100 Most Influential Brazilians and in 2010 considered the Financier of the Year by Latin Trade. He is also a guest lecturer at Unicamp University.

== Background ==
After earning his PhD in Economics at Cornell University, Dr. Coutinho returned to Brazil to pursue a career in academia, teaching Economics at Unicamp from 1974 to 1986. At Unicamp, he was a professor of Brazil's president Dilma Rousseff.

Between 1985 and 1988, he became the Executive Secretary of Brazil's Ministry of Science and Technology, participating in the structuring of the Ministry and designing policies aimed at areas of high complexity, such as biotechnology, computer science, fine chemistry, precision mechanics and new materials.

After leaving the ministry, Dr. Coutinho co-founded and became a partner at LCA Consulting, where he provided advisory in International Trade, Competition Law and also provided expertise in economic studies.

In 1994, he coordinated the Competitiveness Study on Brazilian Industry, the work of almost one hundred specialists who mapped with unprecedented extent the Brazilian industrial sector.

In 2007, he left behind a very successful business at LCA to run the Brazilian Development Bank (BNDES). Since then the bank has ventured into three new areas: environment, information technology and small-and-medium-sized companies.

Dr. Coutinho has also been a visiting professor at the University of Paris XIII, the University of Texas, the Institute Ortega y Gasset in Spain, as well as at the University of São Paulo (USP).

A specialist in industrial and international economics, he has written and organized several books, in addition to an extensive production of articles, published in Brazil and abroad. His academic studies focus on industrial policy and the implications of the Brazilian currency Real in the country's economy.

Dr. Coutinho has a PhD in Economics from Cornell University, a Master's degree in Economics from the Institute of Economic Research of the University of São Paulo (USP) and a bachelor's in Economics from USP. While studying Economics at USP, he has been awarded the Gastão Vidigal prize for being the university's best student of Economics.

Government offices
Preceded by Demian Fiocca	Chairman of the Brazilian Development Bank; 2007–2016	Succeeded by Maria Bastos Marques
