= Tarciana Medeiros =

Brazilian banker

Tarciana Paula Gomes Medeiros
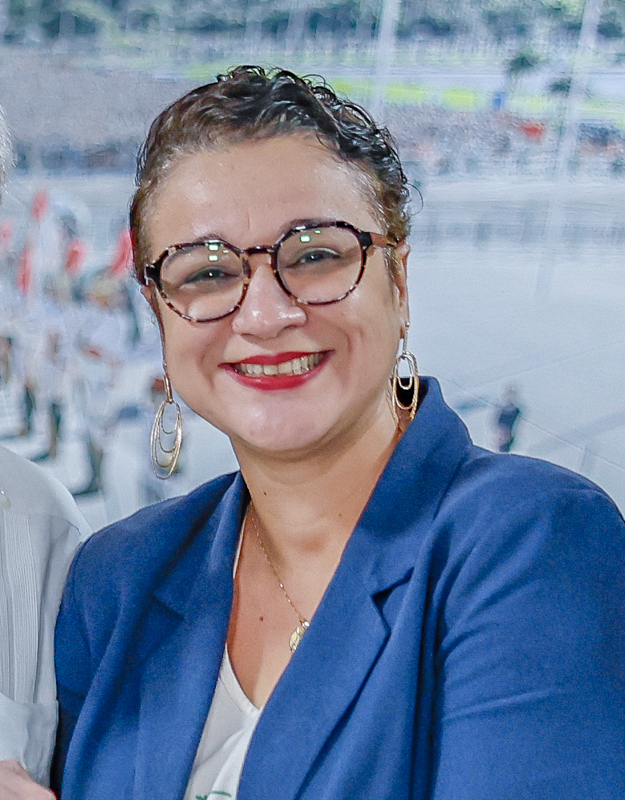

CEO of Banco do Brasil
- Incumbent
- Assumed office 26 January 2023
- Preceded by: Fausto de Andrade Ribeiro

Personal details
- Born: 11 December 1978 (age 47) Campina Grande, Paraíba, Brazil
- Education: Pontifical Catholic University of Rio Grande do Sul (MBA)

Tarciana Paula Gomes Medeiros (born 1978) is a Brazilian economist and business executive. In January 2023 she was appointed as CEO of Banco do Brasil (BB), the second-largest bank in Brazil and Latin America, which is controlled by the Brazilian government. In 2023 she was considered by Forbes magazine to be the 24th most-powerful woman in the world.

== Early life and education ==
Medeiros was born on 12 November 1978 in Campina Grande in the State of Paraíba. She was eight years old when she first started helping her father out at his market stall. She became a teacher in 1998 and joined Banco do Brasil in 2000. She obtained a bachelor's degree in business administration in 2012 from the online university Faculdade AIEC.

== Career ==
Following a competitive exam, Medeiros started with the bank as a relationship manager in Teixeira de Freitas in the state of Bahia, moving to a similar position in Itabuna, Bahia in October 2005. In 2008 she became a client relations manager in João Pessoa in Paraíba. In May 2013 she became a business manager in Belém in the State of Pará. Between 2015 and 2017, she headed the Commercial Superintendence arm of BB Seguros. In 2017 she became part of the bank’s professional advancement training programme for executives and in 2020 she obtained post-graduate qualifications in administration, business and marketing from the Escola Superior Aberta (Superior Open School - ESAB). In 2019, she became an executive in the Loan and Financing Solutions Department of the bank. Two years later she became executive manager of the Retail, SMEs and Individual Customers Department.

On 26 January 2023, Brazil's president Luiz Inácio Lula da Silva appointed Medeiros as the president of Banco do Brasil. In making the announcement of her appointment he stated that "Banco do Brasil is 200 years old, and no one has ever thought, not even remotely, about having a woman as president. And we are going to prove that a woman can be better than many men who have already run the bank". She thus became the first woman to hold this position since the bank was founded in 1808. In 2024 she received an MBA in marketing, branding and growth from the Pontifical Catholic University of Rio Grande do Sul (PCURS). At the time of her appointment, she was studying for a further MBA at the College of Agriculture, University of São Paulo (ESALQ), the bank being a major lender to the agricultural sector.

An advocate for environmental policies, she spoke at the 2023 United Nations General Assembly about the importance of allocating more funding for environmentally sustainable businesses. Emphasising this, she agreed a partnership between Banco do Brasil and the Inter-American Development Bank to put $250 million toward renewable energy resources and sustainable infrastructure.

== Recognition ==
In December 2023, the business magazine Forbes named her as being 24th on a list of the 100 most powerful women in the world.

== Personal life ==
Medeiros has two children from her first marriage. She is now in a lesbian marriage. She is known as an advocate for the rights of LGBTQ people in Brazil.
