= José Carlos de Assis =

Brazilian economist

José Carlos de Assis is a Brazilian economist. He holds a PhD in production engineering from the Federal University of Rio de Janeiro, and is professor of international economics at the State University of Paraíba and has authored over 20 books on political economy.

== Bibliography ==
- Assis, José Carlos de. A chave do tesouro: Anatomia dos escândalos financeiros: Brasil 1974–1983. 2 ed. Rio de Janeiro: Paz e Terra, 1983. 252 p.
- Assis, José Carlos de. A dupla face da corrupção. Rio de Janeiro: Paz e Terra, 1984. 174 p.
- Assis, José Carlos de. Os mandarins da república: Anatomia dos escândalos na administração pública: 1968–1984. 5 ed. Rio de Janeiro: Paz e Terra, 1984. 231 p.
