= School of Economics, Business and Accounting of the University of São Paulo =

University of São Paulo department

Faculdade de Economia, Administração e Contabilidade da Universidade de São Paulo
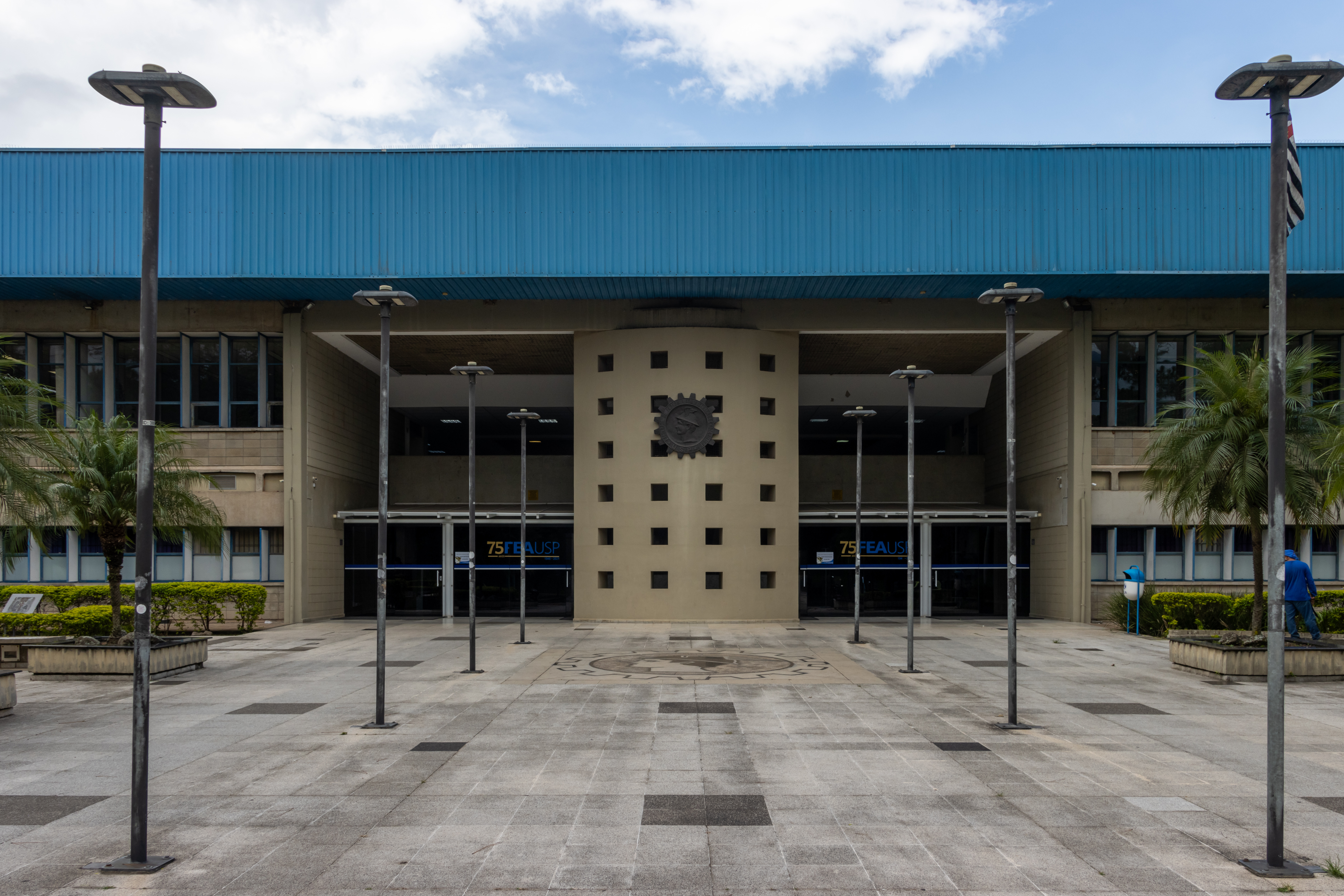
- Type: Public
- Established: 1946
- Undergraduates: 3,105
- Postgraduates: 551
- Location: São Paulo, SP, Brazil
- Campus: Cidade Universitária - SP
- Website: www.fea.usp.br

The School of Economics, Business and Accounting, also known as FEA-USP, is one of the departments of the University of São Paulo, a notable public university in the São Paulo, Brazil.

Founded in 1946, it is known as one of the most prestigious business schools of Brazil and Latin America in its fields.

== Notable alumni ==
- Delfim Netto - former Brazilian Minister of Finance (1967–1974) under the brazilian military dictatorship
- Guido Mantega - former Brazilian Minister of Finance (2006–2014) under the office of Luiz Inácio Lula da Silva and Dilma Rousseff
- Zélia Cardoso de Mello- former Brazilian Minister of Finance (1990–1991) under the office of Fernando Collor de Mello

== Notable faculty ==
- Alice Piffer Canabrava
