= Brazilian Development Bank =

Banking company that provides risk capital for economic development projects

Banco Nacional de Desenvolvimento Econômico e Social

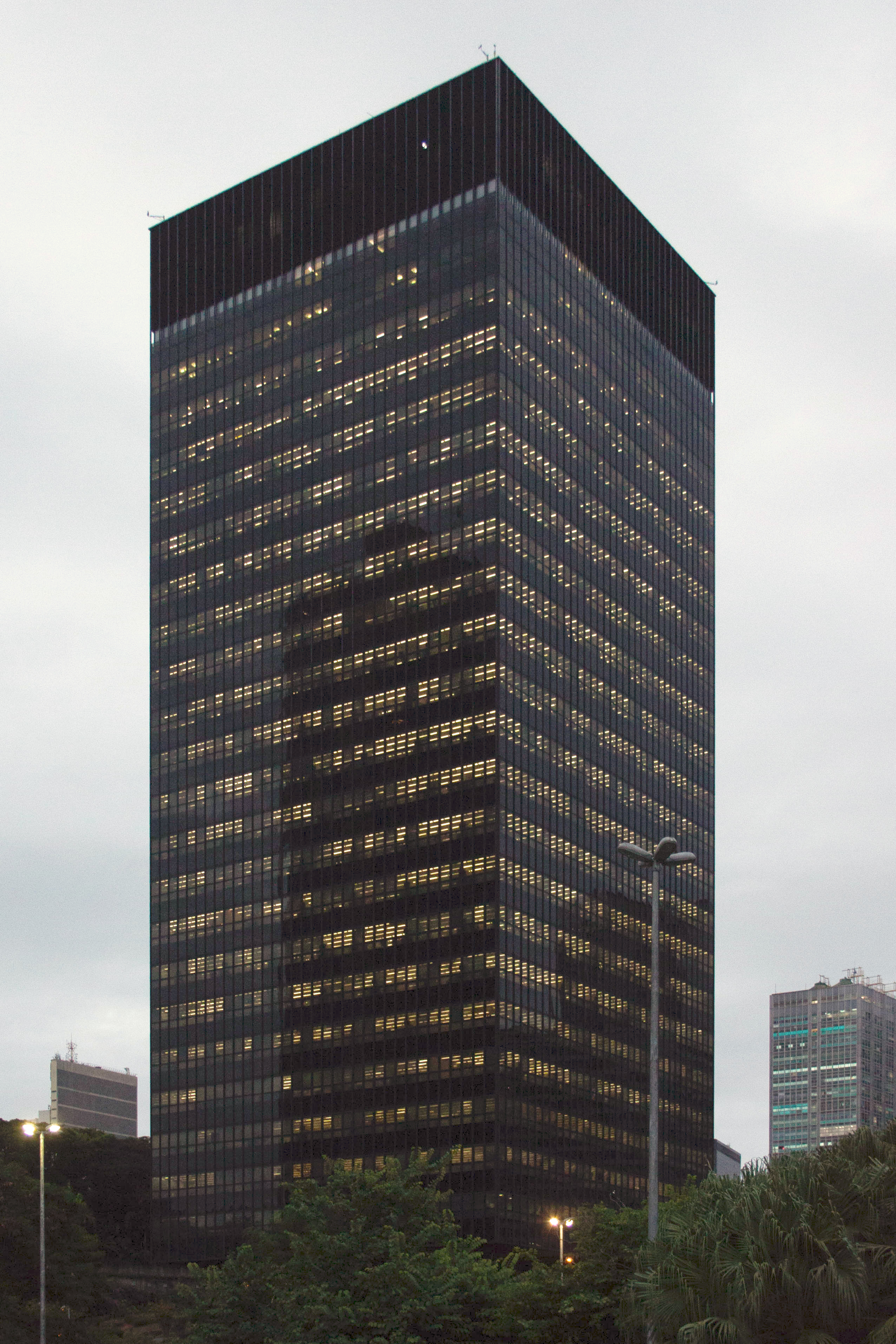
- BNDES Building
- Company type: Government-owned corporation
- Industry: Finance and Development
- Founded: 20 June 1952
- Headquarters: Rio de Janeiro, Brazil
- Key people: Aloizio Mercadante (Chairman)
- Net income: ▲US$ 2 billion (2016)
- Total assets: ▼US$ 272.1 billion (2016)
- Number of employees: 2,000
- Parent: Government of Brazil
- Subsidiaries: BNDESPAR; BNDES Ltd. Agência Especial de Financiamento Industrial
- Website: bndes.gov.br

The National Bank for Economic and Social Development (Portuguese: Banco Nacional de Desenvolvimento Econômico e Social; BNDES) is a development bank structured as a federal public company associated with the Ministry of the Economy of Brazil. The stated goal is to provide long-term financing for endeavors that contribute to the country's development. BNDES is one of the largest development banks in the world (after the Chinese Development Bank, which boasts assets of around RMB 7.52 trillion, or around $1.2 tn). Its non-performing loan ratio is also less favorable (2.2%) compared to the CDB's that stands below 1%.

Among the objectives of BNDES are the strengthening of the capital structure of private companies, the development of capital markets, the trading of machines and equipment and the financing of exports.

Since its establishment on June 20, 1952, BNDES has financed large-scale industrial and infrastructure endeavors and has played a significant role in the support of investments in agriculture, commerce, and the service industry, as well as in small- and medium-sized private businesses, even though its focus lies on larger firms. The bank has supported social investments aimed at education and health, family agriculture, basic sanitation and mass transportation.

The bank offers financial support lines and programs to companies of any size and sector that have been set up in the country. The partnership with financial institutions with agencies established around the country facilitates the dissemination of credit, enabling greater access to BNDES's financial services.

BNDES has three integral subsidiaries: FINAME, BNDESPAR, and BNDES Limited. Together, the three companies comprise the BNDES System.

== Criticism and controversies ==
BNDES has been accused of operating with larger firms in a corrupt manner and giving help to big corporations instead of small and medium-sized private businesses.

Operating with statutes of "ethical and environmental principles", in 2012, BNDES approved a 22.5 billion real loan for the construction of the Belo Monte Dam, a project that displaced local communities. The plan was strongly criticized by environmental groups and indigenous populations.

In 2013, ~90% of BNDESPAR investments concentrates in five industries. In recent BNDES investments, lobby irregularities and conflict of interest arrives with JBS S.A. OGX/EBX Group, GPA (company), and others.

The bank has been criticized for supporting the international expansion of some private firms.

Economists around the world recognize that Brazil has its own development bank, a key financial organization, bigger than the World Bank. As the Nobel Prize economist J. Stiglitz opinion, "... the BNDES is a huge development bank (...) People don’t realize this, but Brazil has actually shown how a single country can create a very effective development bank (...) that actually promotes real development without all the conditionality and all the trappings around the old institutions". Despite the recognition of financial volume, effective infrastructure and organization, the bank is used by only a few industries. The concentration of financial volume in few and perhaps questionable industries contradicts the bank's development and diffusion goals. The concentration contrasts greatly with Brazilian's per capita income and its many small and medium-sized enterprises.

== Leadership ==
The president of BNDES oversees both subsidiaries of the BNDES group: FINAME and BNDESPAR. Together, the three companies comprise the BNDES System. The BNDES President is appointed by the President of Brazil.

=== Presidents ===
Presidents of BNDES
Name	Dates
Ary Frederico Torres	July 1952 - June 1953
Válder Lima Sarmanho	June 1953 - February 1955
Glycon de Paiva Teixeira	March 1955 - February 1956
Lucas Lopes	February 1956 - June 1958
Roberto de Oliveira Campos	August 1958 - July 1959
Lucio Martins Meira	July 1959 - February 1961
José Vicente de Faria Lima	February 1961 - September 1961
Leocádio de Almeida Antunes	September 1961 - June 1963
José Garrido Torres	July 1964 - March 1967
Jayme Magrassi de Sá	March 1967 - October 1970
Marcos Pereira Vianna	October 1970 - March 1979
Luiz Antonio Sande de Oliveira	March 1979 - September 1983
Jorge Lins Freire	September 1983 - October 1984
José Carlos Perdigão Medeiros da Fonseca	October 1984 - March 1985
Dilson Domingos Funaro	March 1985 - August 1985
André Franco Montoro Filho	August 1985 - January 1987
Márcio João de Andrade Fortes	January 1987 - September 1989
Ney Fontes de Melo Távora	October 1989 - March 1990
Eduardo Marco Modiano	March 1990 - October 1992
Antonio Barros de Castro	October 1992 - March 1993
Luiz Carlos Delben Leite	March 1993 - August 1993
Pérsio Arida	September 1993 - January 1995
Edmar Lisboa Bacha	January 1995 - November 1995
Luiz Carlos Mendonça de Barros	November 1995 - April 1998
André Pinheiro de Lara Resende	April 1998 - November 1998
José Pio Borges de Castro Filho	November 1998 - July 1999
Andrea Sandro Calabi	July 1999 - February 2000
Francisco Roberto André Gros	February 2000 - January 2002
Eleazar de Carvalho Filho	January 2002 - January 2003
Carlos Lessa	January 2003 - November 2004
Guido Mantega	November 2004 - March 2006
Demian Fiocca	March 2006 - May 2007
Luciano Coutinho	May 2007 - May 2016
Maria Silvia Bastos Marques	June 2016 - May 2017
Paulo Rabello de Castro	June 2017 - March 2018
Dyogo Oliveira	April 2018 - December 2018
Joaquim Levy	January 2019 - June 2019
Gustavo Montezano	July 2019 - December 2022
Aloizio Mercadante	December 2022 – present

== See also ==
- List of national development banks
