= Banco do Brasil =

Brazilian banking institution

Banco do Brasil S.A.

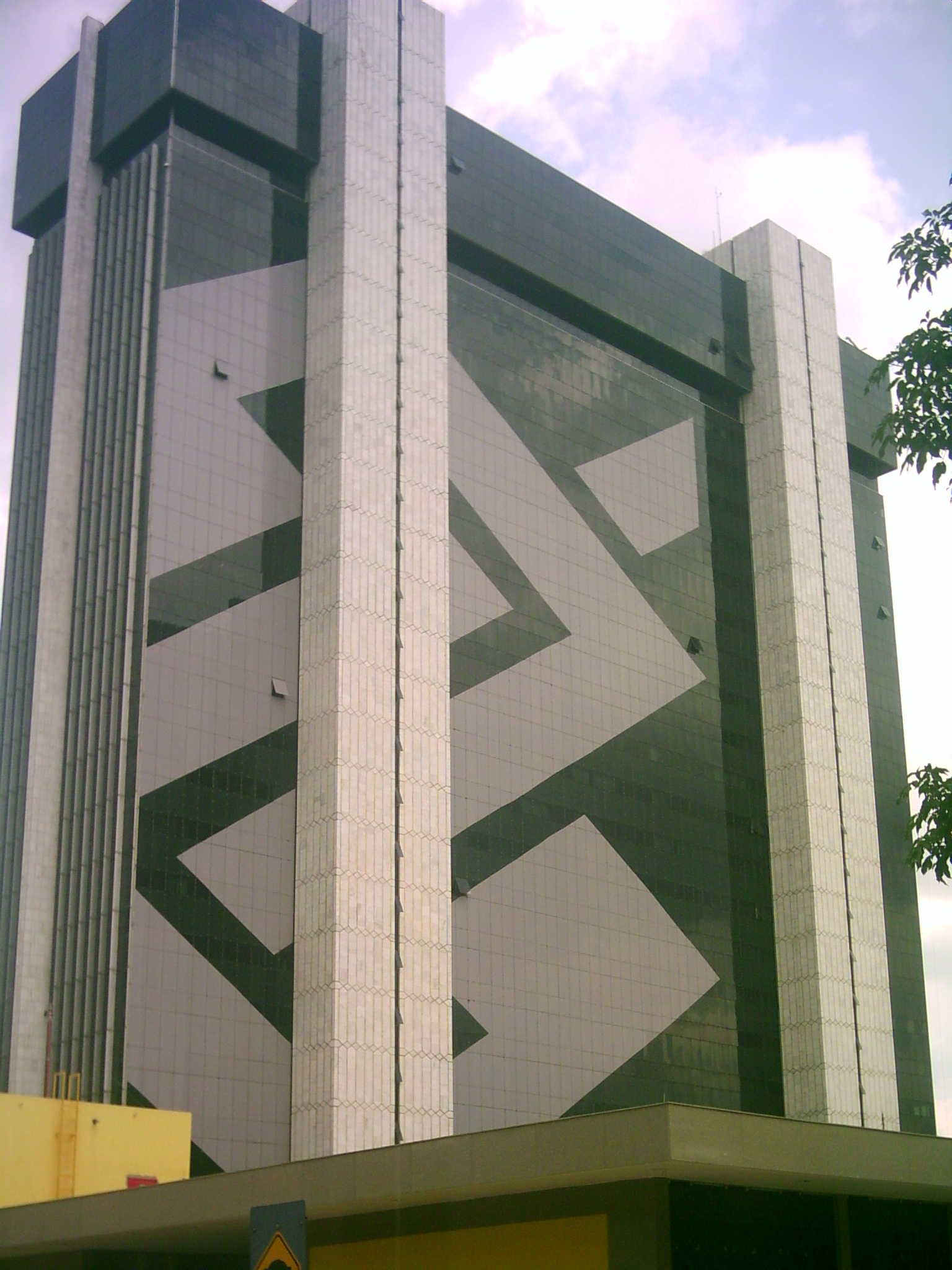
- Headquarters in Brasília, Brazil
- Type: Sociedade Anônima
- Traded as: B3: BBAS3; Ibovespa Component
- Industry: Financial services
- Founded: October 12, 1808; 217 years ago
- Founder: John VI of Portugal
- Headquarters: Brasília, Federal District, Brazil
- Key people: Tarciana Medeiros (Chairwoman and CEO)
- Products: Retail banking; corporate banking; investment banking; insurance; private banking; private equity; mortgage loans; credit cards; investment management; wealth management; asset management; mutual funds; exchange-traded funds; index funds
- Revenue: ▲US$ 54.9 billion (2025)
- Net income: ▼US$ 3.7 billion (2025)
- Total assets: ▼US$ 442.8 billion (2025)
- Owner: Brazilian Government (50.0%) (2021)
- Number of employees: ▼84,597 (2021)
- Subsidiaries: Banco Votorantim; Banco Patagonia; BB Seguridade; Banco do Brasil Americas; BrasilPrev; BB Tecnologia e Serviços
- Website: bb.com.br

Banco do Brasil S.A. (pronounced [ˈbɐ̃ku du bɾaˈziw], lit. 'Bank of Brazil') is a Brazilian financial services company headquartered in Brasília, Brazil. The oldest bank in Brazil, and among the oldest banks in continuous operation in the world, it was founded by John VI, King of Portugal, on Wednesday, 12 October 1808. It is the second largest banking institution in Brazil, as well as the second largest in Latin America. Banco do Brasil is controlled by the Brazilian government and is listed at the B3 stock exchange in São Paulo.

It has been one of the four most profitable Brazilian banks since 2000 (along with Itaú Unibanco, Banco Bradesco and Banco Santander) and holds a strong leadership position in retail banking.

== History ==
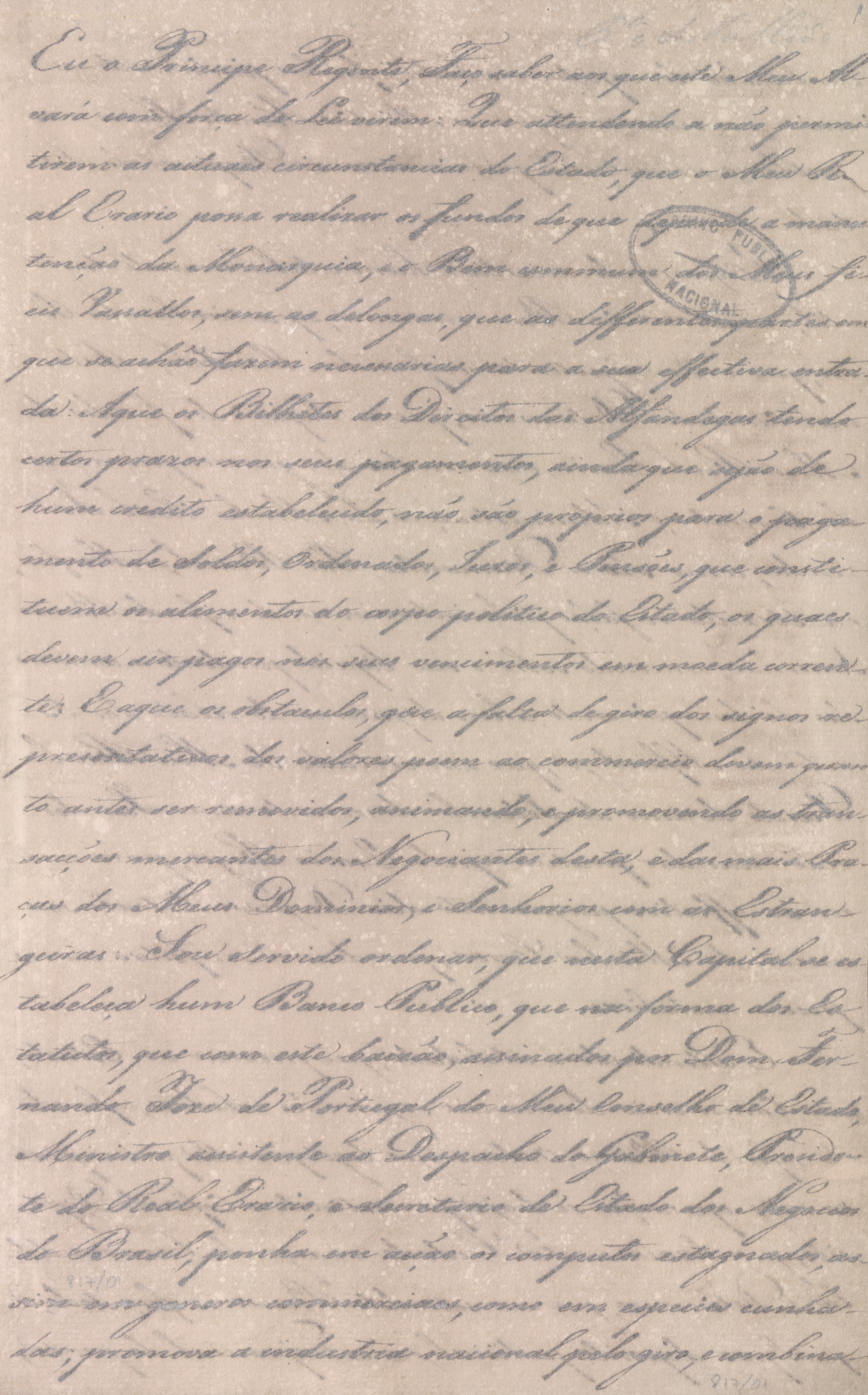
First page of the document signed by Prince Regent D. João, who founded Banco do Brasil. National Archives of Brazil.

Banco do Brasil was founded in 1808 by then prince regent John (later King John VI of Portugal) to finance the kingdom's public debt when he moved from Europe to Brazil. "As a mixed institution under state control, the Banco do Brasil served as a commercial bank, the government's fiscal agent, and Brazil's first bank of issue." It went bankrupt two times in history: once during independence in 1821, when John VI returned to Portugal taking with him some of the bank's assets, and a second time in 1898.

From 1821 to 1964 Banco do Brasil occasionally performed tasks that exceeded its role as a traditional commercial bank: issuing currency, having the monopoly of currency exchange transactions and serving as National Treasury holder for the government. Such tasks were gradually given to other governmental institutions, mainly with the creation of the Central Bank of Brazil in 1964 and the separation from the National Treasury in 1987.

From 1992 onwards it was restructured as a commercial bank, using its huge geographic distribution and credit assets to leverage its redesign as a "normal" bank. In the process, tens of thousands of workers were laid off.

After decades of losses due to being used to finance some of the Brazilian Federal Government public policies, the bank became very profitable across the years. The bank is one of the key structures used by Brazilian government to restabilize the market (like preventing cartelizations in the bank interest market or stabilizing the bank credit during financial distress times like the 2008–2009 global crisis). The institution also is used to finance public programs such as the DRS – Sustainable Regional Development initiatives.

In November 2013, The Banker ranked Banco de Brasil as the top bank in Brazil based on Tier 1 capital.

== Branding ==
The current logo has been in use since the 1960s, when the standard colors changed from brown and yellow to blue-grey and yellow. The blue and yellow mimic the colors of the Brazilian flag.

Since the early 1980s, the bank has sponsored several sports competitions (in sports such as beach soccer, volleyball, tennis, table tennis, futsal, sailing, motorsport and beach volleyball). It is the official sponsor for Robert Scheidt, Gustavo Kuerten, Enzo Fittipaldi, Pietro Fittipaldi, and the Brazilian national beach soccer, volleyball, and futsal teams.

The bank also sponsors other cultural events such as plays through its organization CCBB (Centro Cultural Banco do Brasil) and amateur sports through the AABB (Associação Atlética Banco do Brasil).

Supermodel Gisele Bündchen was chosen to be the face of their first global ad campaign in 2012.

In April 2023, Banco do Brasil raised US$750 million through its first issuance of sustainability bonds. Whose resources should be used exclusively in projects with sustainable purposes, aligned with ESG policies.

== Services ==
In addition to commercial and government services, the bank offers a large variety of services to the consumer including bill payment services (Boleto), ATM loans, and a single package that contains the account numbers for checking, multiple savings accounts, and investment account. The account holder may apply for international MasterCard and Visa debit cards which act as both a credit card on a loan account, and as a debit card on the checking account (a little different from the arrangement in many other countries, where both the debit and credit functions of a debit card act on the checking account). The list of services offered encompass many complex automatic functions from ATMs and online such as a wide variety of loans, automatic payments, Brazilian bill payments, and deposits to other Brazilian accounts. Many merchants routinely accept account-to-account transfers as payment for goods.

== International users ==
Banco do Brasil has a few branches in the United States (Washington, Miami) and other countries. These branches are intended for use by large companies and for permanent residents of Brasil who visit the other countries, but they also offer regular services for residents of the countries where they are located.

Banco do Brasil has been expanding its international presence and currently has more than 44 points of service abroad, divided into branches, sub-branches, business units / offices and subsidiaries.

Offices and subsidiaries

- (Paraguay) Asunción
- (Argentina) Buenos Aires
- (Venezuela) Caracas
- (Paraguay) Ciudad del Este
- (United Arab Emirates) Dubai
- (Cayman Islands) George Town
- Hong Kong
- (Bolivia) La Paz
- (Peru) Lima
- (Portugal) Lisbon
- (United Kingdom) London
- (Angola) Luanda
- (Spain) Madrid
- Mexico City
- (United States) Miami
- (Uruguay) Montevideo
- (France) Paris
- Panama City
- (Italy) Rome
- (Chile) Santiago
- Singapore
- (South Korea) Seoul
- (China) Shanghai
- (Japan) Tokyo
- (Austria) Vienna
- (United States) Washington, D.C.

== Interest rates ==
Interest rates on loans vary to a great extent but, being a public-owned bank that operates as a commercial venture, Banco do Brasil is not noted for having the highest, or the lowest rates either.

== Relationship with the government ==
Traditionally the CEO is appointed by the Brazilian president but usually picked from a list of career directors. A few CEOs were taken from outside the financial industry.

Banco do Brasil has the monopoly of a number of government funding programs, like Pronaf (National Subsistence Farming Support), DRS, Fome Zero (zero hunger), PASEP, and others, and is the bank of choice for most municipal and state governments.

== Hiring process ==
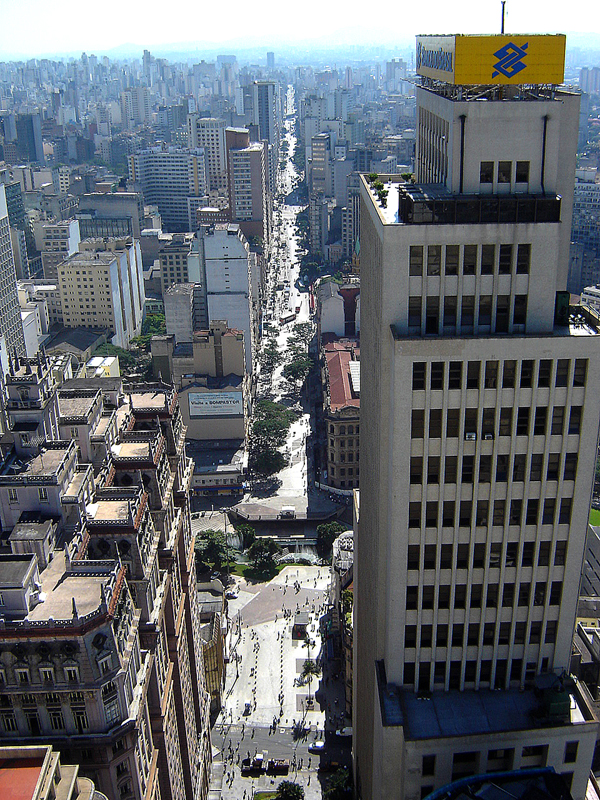
The Banco do Brasil office in São Paulo, Brazil.

Being publicly-owned, Banco do Brasil must recruit employees through a public selection process, called the concurso público, who must work strictly according to business norms. Due to the high standards and job security that the concurso público compels, a position with the Banco do Brasil is highly desirable in Brazil. The hiring process is conducted separately for each region of Brazil, with approved candidates recruited to any branch in the region. Candidates must be Brazilian nationals (or legal, naturalized residents) and must have completed military and electoral registration obligations (military service is mandatory for men, and voter registration is mandatory for all Brazilians aged 18 to 70).

Banco do Brasil maintains 49 offices/places of business in 23 countries and, depending on local law, may employ local hires. For instance, the Miami Branch and the North America Regional Office (BBUSA) hire locally.

Local hires must pass a competitive test, speak multiple languages, and demonstrate a knowledge of finance, economics, computer sciences, business administration and asset management, trade, structured and project finance, etc. Prior work experience is fundamental.

Other publicly-owned Brazilian banks, like the Caixa Econômica Federal, Banco da Amazônia, and Banco do Nordeste, maintain similar processes, but the Banco do Brasil's concurso público sets the gold standard for Brazilian public service employment.

== Sponsorships ==
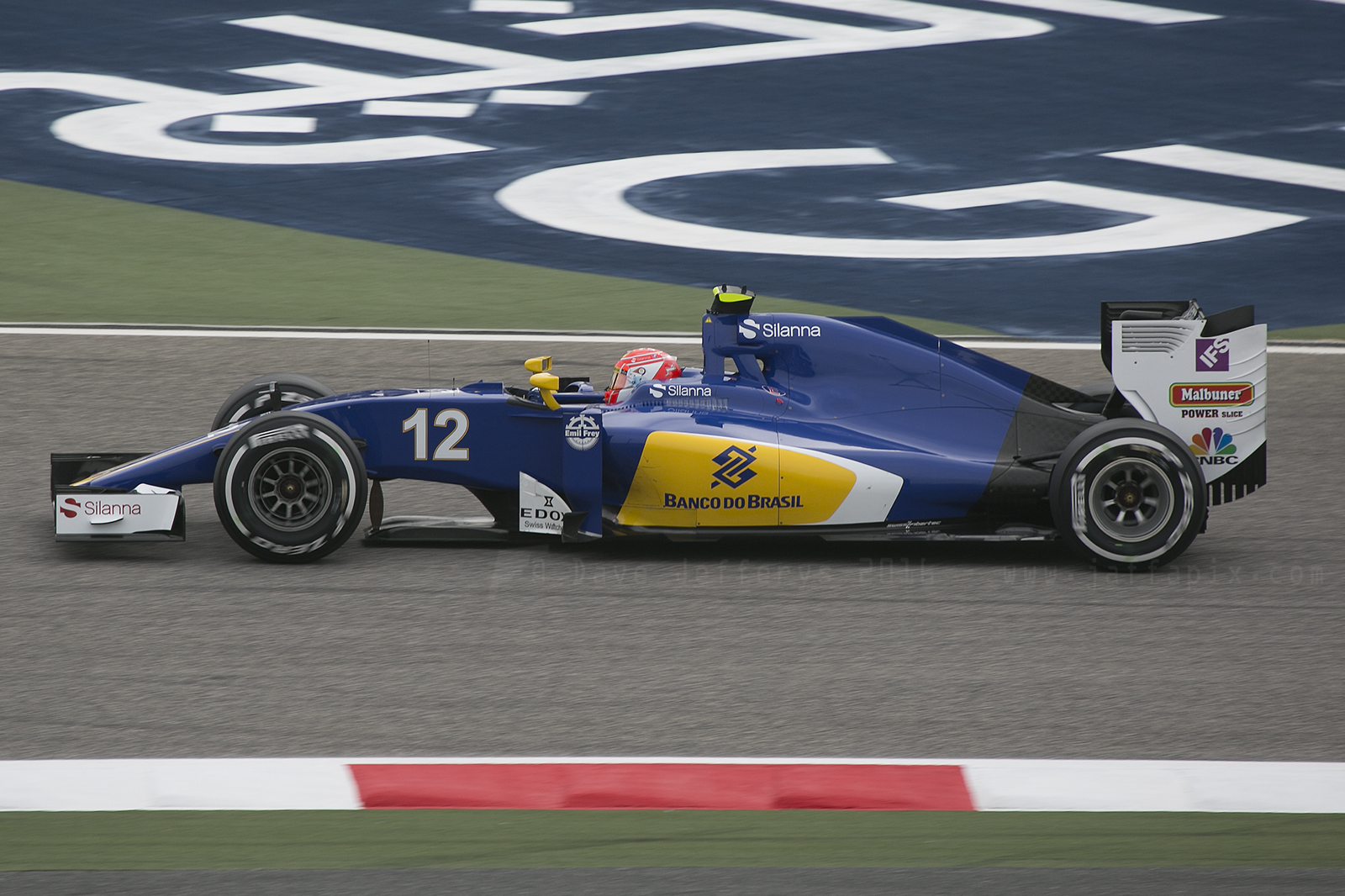
The Banco do Brasil logo on Nasr's Sauber C35

Banco do Brasil is an official sponsor of the Brazil national volleyball team and had a long-running association with Brazilian racing driver Felipe Nasr and were the title sponsor of his team, Sauber. The bank were also previously sponsored by Brawn GP.

Currently, Banco do Brasil sponsors the brothers Enzo Fittipaldi, Formula 2 driver for Charouz, and Pietro Fittipaldi, Haas F1 Team reserve driver

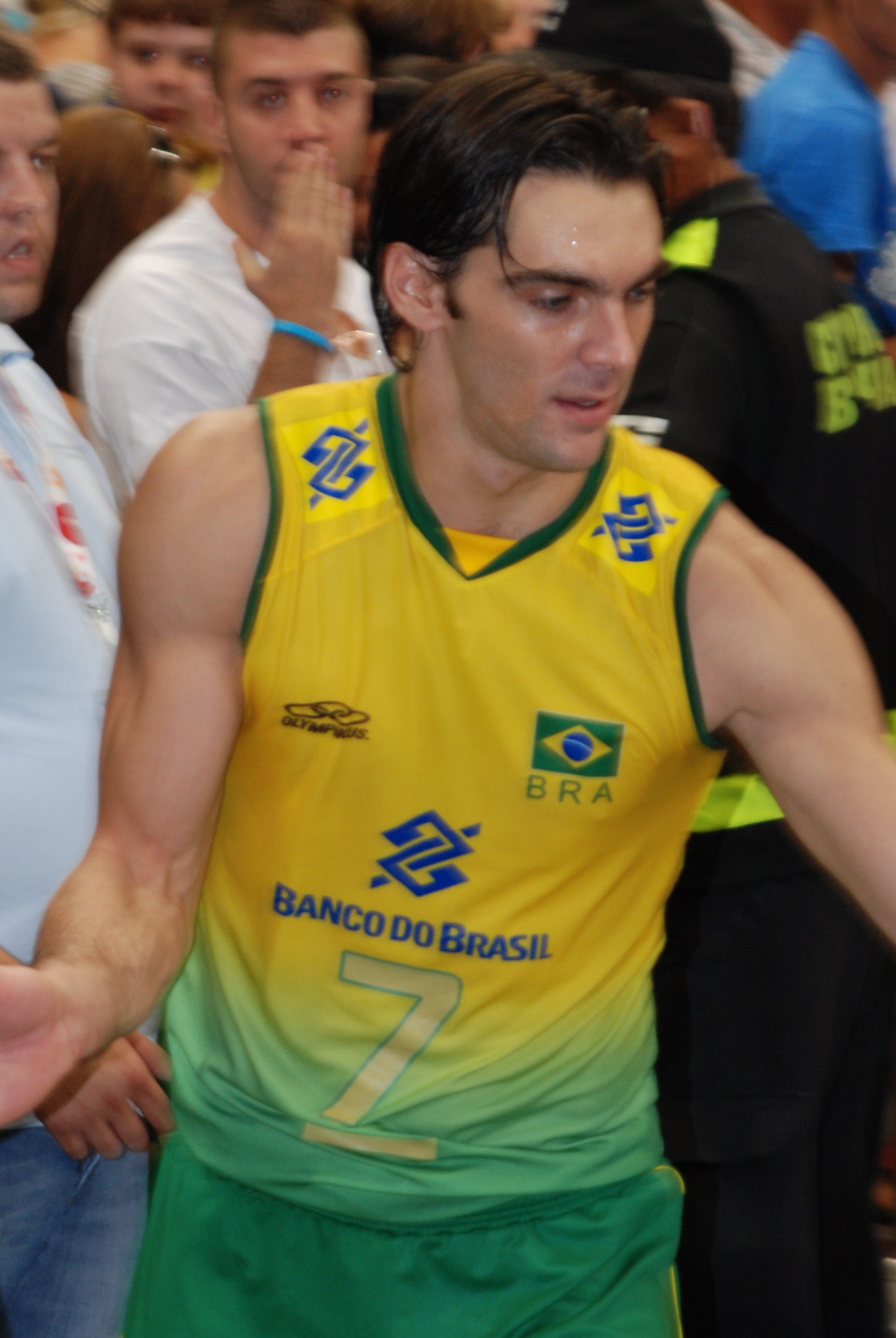
Giba
