= Presidency of Lula da Silva =

Presidency of Lula da Silva may refer to:

- First presidency of Lula da Silva, from 2003 to 2011
- Second presidency of Lula da Silva, since 2023

== See also ==
- Inauguration of Luiz Inácio Lula da Silva
- First cabinet of Lula da Silva
- Second cabinet of Lula da Silva
- List of international presidential trips made by Luiz Inácio Lula da Silva
- List of executive orders by Lula da Silva
- List of ambassadors appointed by Lula da Silva
