= Presidential transition =

Presidential transition may refer to:

- Argentina presidential transition
- Philippines presidential transition
  - Presidential transition of Benigno Aquino III
  - Presidential transition of Rodrigo Duterte
  - Presidential transition of Bongbong Marcos
- Spanish presidential transition
- United States presidential transition
  - Second presidential transition of Donald Trump
  - Presidential transition of Joe Biden
  - First presidential transition of Donald Trump
  - Presidential transition of Barack Obama
  - Planned presidential transition of Mitt Romney
