= Second presidential transition of Luiz Inácio Lula da Silva =

Transfer of presidential power from Jair Bolsonaro to Luiz Inácio Lula da Silva

Second presidential transition of Luiz Inácio Lula da SIlva
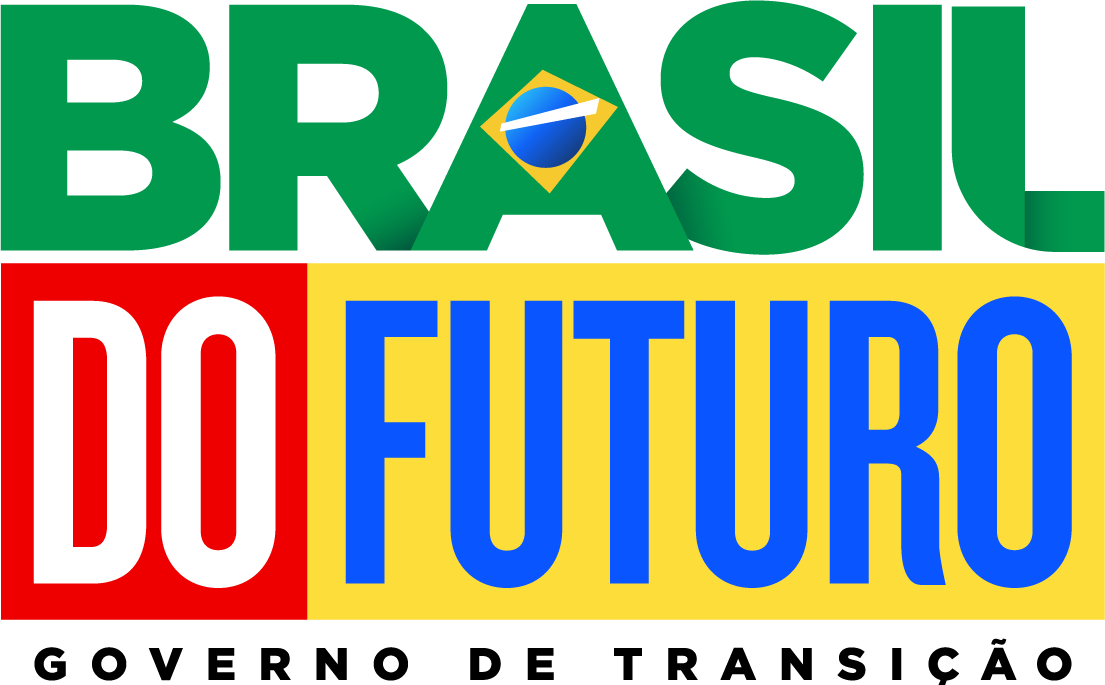
- Formation: November 3, 2022
- Dissolved: January 1, 2023
- Purpose: Presidential transition
- Headquarters: SCES, Trecho 2, Brasília, DF
- Secretary General: Geraldo Alckmin
- Co-chairs: Geraldo Alckmin (since November 1, 2022); Gleisi Hoffmann (since November 1, 2022); Aloizio Mercadante (since November 1, 2022); Floriano Pesaro (since November 5, 2022); Janja da Silva (since November 7, 2022)
- Key people: Luiz Inácio Lula da Silva; Geraldo Alckmin
- Website: brasildofuturo.lula.com.br

The presidential transition of Luiz Inácio Lula da Silva's second presidency officially began on November 3, 2022, and ended with his inauguration on January 1, 2023. Then vice president-elect Geraldo Alckmin was appointed as the chair of Lula's transition team on November 1, 2022.

== Background ==
Following the results of the 2022 Brazilian general election on October 30, president-elect Lula's campaign team expressed concern about incumbent president Jair Bolsonaro's 44-hour delay in recognizing the results of the polls and authorizing the start of the government transition. The green light was given only on November 2 by Bolsonaro's Chief of Staff of the Presidency, Ciro Nogueira.

== Timeline ==
=== Post-election ===
- October 30: Lula is declared the winner of the election.
- October 31: President Bolsonaro refuses to accept the elections results.
- November 1: Vice president-elect Alckmin appointed as the chair of Lula's transition team.
- November 2: Bolsonaro avoids conceding but authorizes the beginning of transition, as pro-Bolsonaro demonstrations blocked access to airports and highways.
- November 3: President Bolsonaro met vice president-elect Alckmin at the Planalto Palace.

=== Establishment of the transition team ===
The transition team was appointed by Lula since the day after the elections with more than fifty Brazilian officials led by some names that will compose the new administration as ministers. The national president of the Workers' Party, Gleisi Hoffmann, and the former minister, Aloizio Mercadante, were chosen as co-chairs of the transition team.

=== Transition team ===
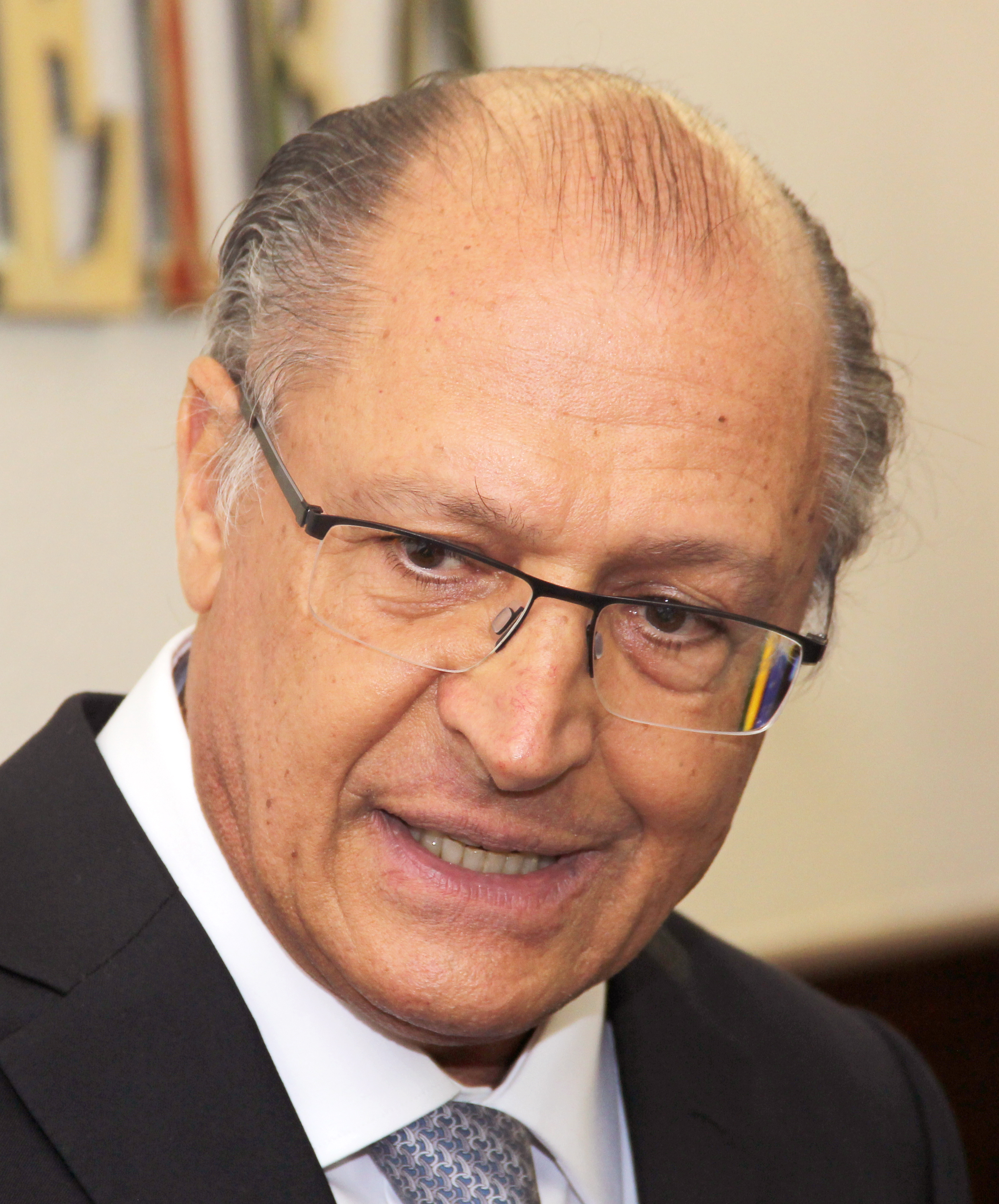
Geraldo Alckmin
Vice president-elect of Brazil (announced November 1)

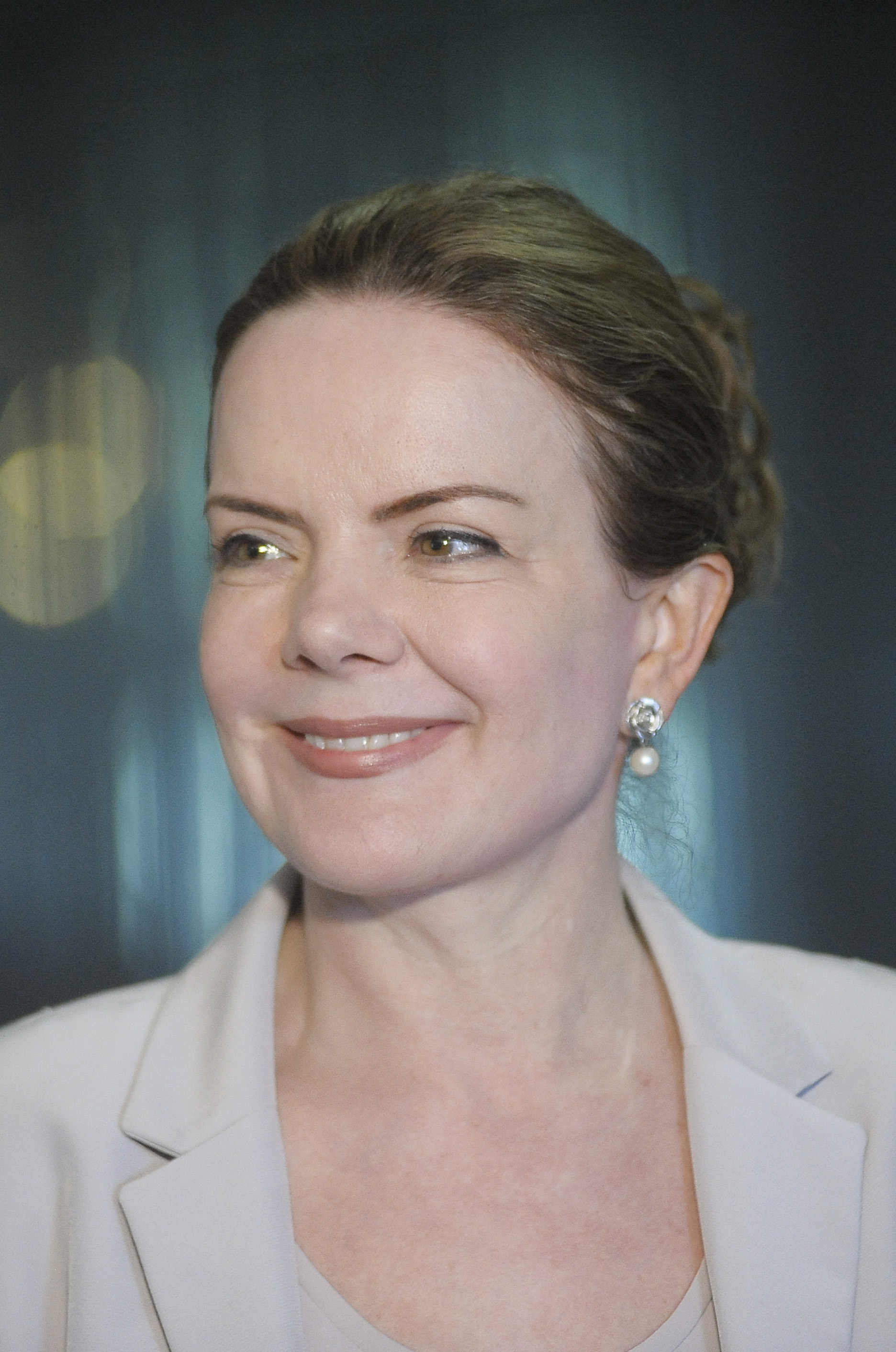
Gleisi Hoffmann
Member of the Chamber of Deputies (announced November 1)

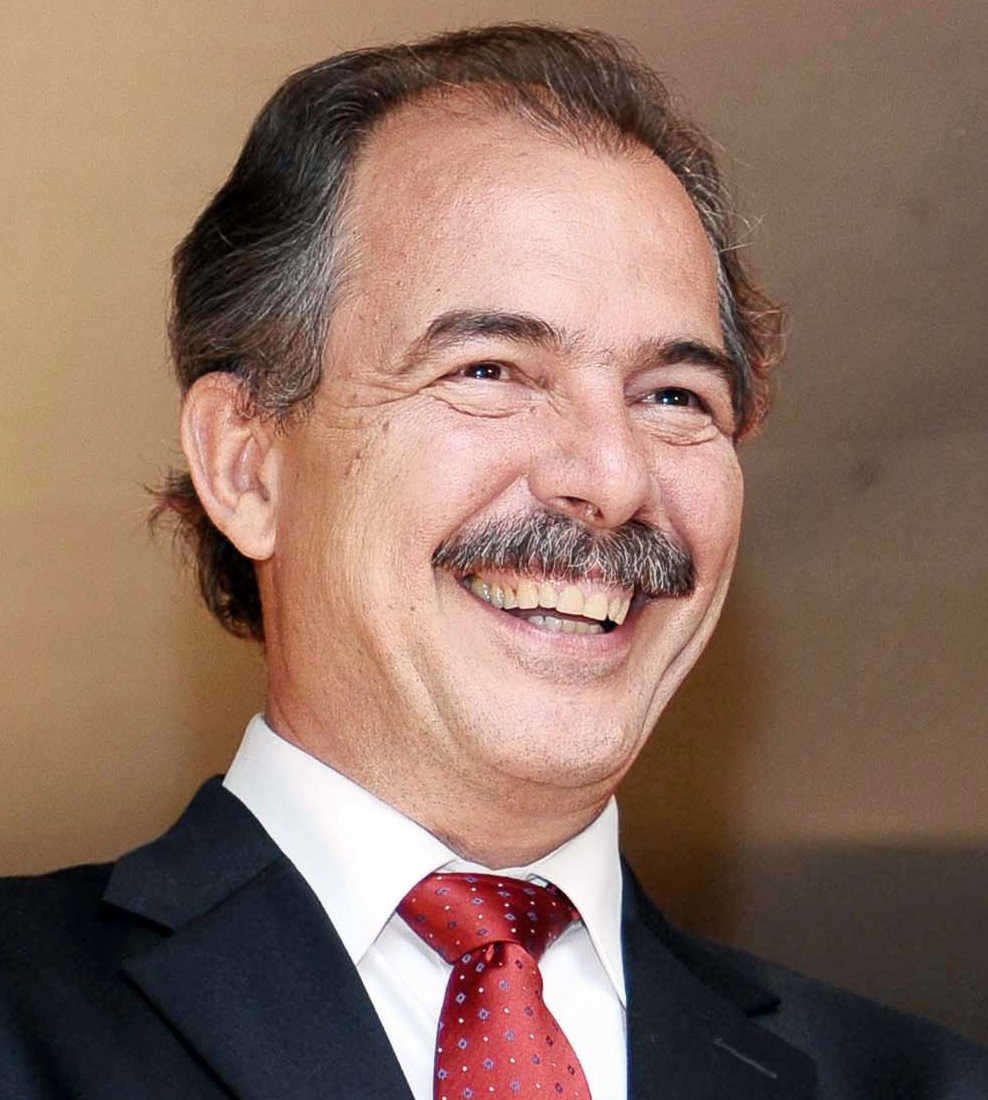
Aloizio Mercadante
Former Minister of Education (announced November 1)

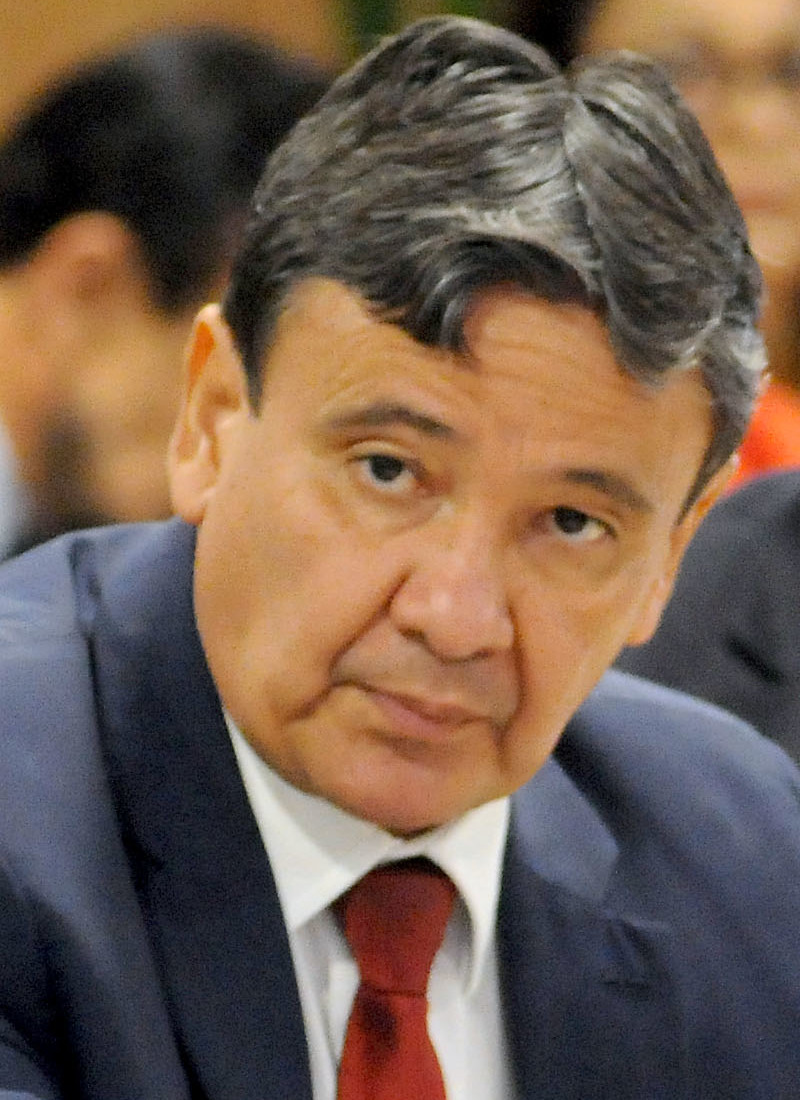
Wellington Dias
Member-elect of the Federal Senate (announced November 1)

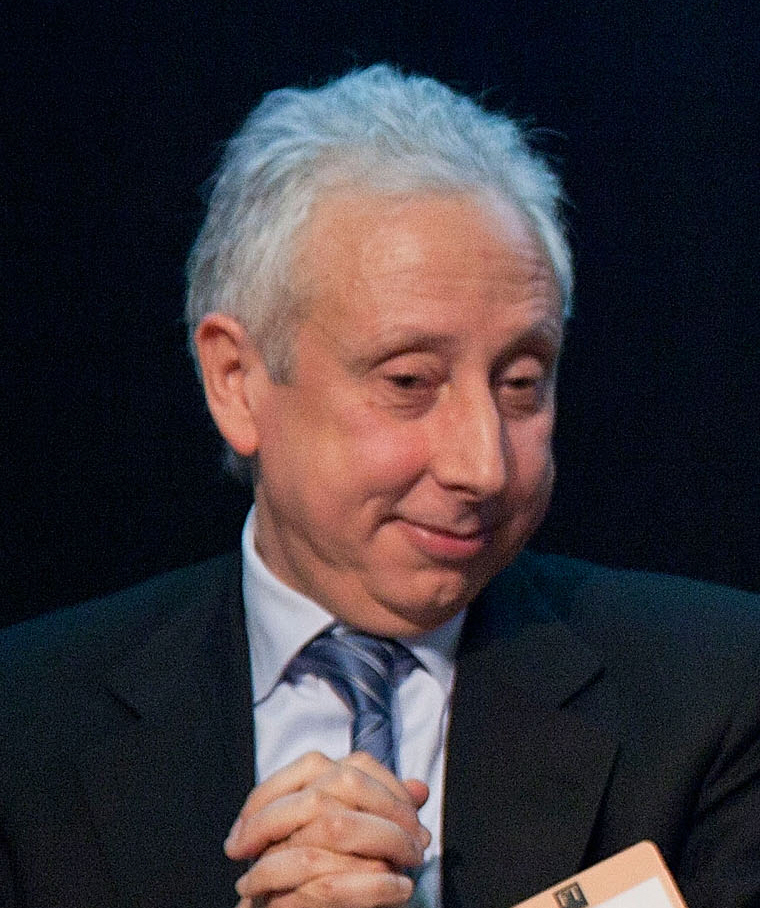
Pérsio Arida
Former President of the Central Bank of Brazil (announced November 5)

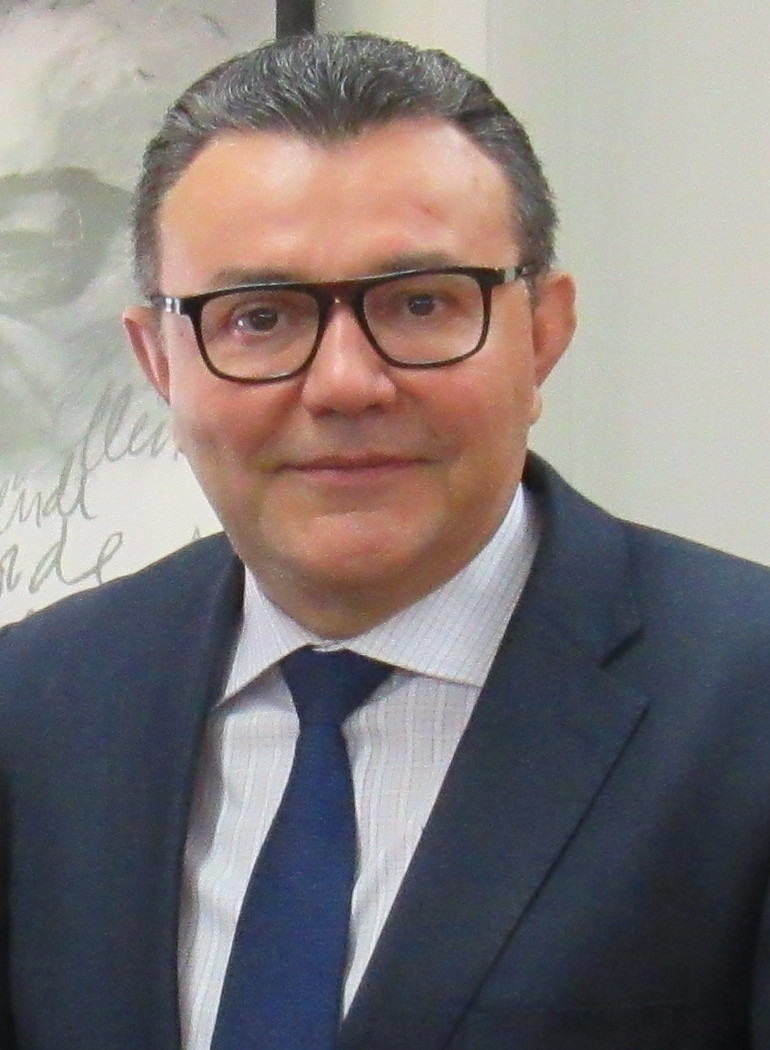
Carlos Siqueira
National President of the Brazilian Socialist Party (announced November 5)

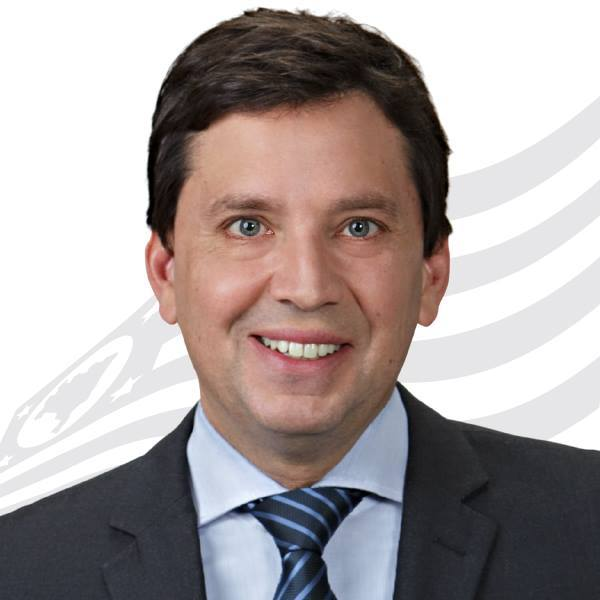
Floriano Pesaro
Former Secretary of Social Development of São Paulo (announced November 5)

==== Other transition team appointments ====
- André Lara Resende, economist
- Guilherme Mello, economist

==== Advisory council ====
The advisory council is composed of several officials who helped to write the Lula's administration program, including:

- Celso Amorim, former Minister of Foreign Affairs
- Fernando Haddad, former Minister of Education
- Jaques Wagner, former Minister of Defence
- Carlos Lupi, former Minister of Labour
- Simone Tebet, member of the Federal Senate
- Marina Silva, former Minister of the Environment
- Luiz Dulci, former Secretary General of the Presidency of the Republic
- Gilberto Carvalho, former Secretary General of the Presidency of the Republic

=== Planned executive decisions ===
Lula's administration planned several decisions reversing those made by Bolsonaro's administration, including:

- Withdraw from the Geneva Consensus Declaration
- Rejoin the Union of South American Nations and the Community of Latin American and Caribbean States
- Restore recognition of Nicolás Maduro as president of Venezuela and reopen the Brazilian embassy in Caracas
- Restore goals of reduction of greenhouse gas emissions according to the Paris Agreement
- Restore monitoring against deforestation of the Amazon rainforest
- Relaunch the Growth Acceleration Program
- Relaunch the Minha Casa, Minha Vida program

== See also ==
- 2022 Brazilian election protests
- Argentina presidential transition
- Spanish presidential transition
- United States presidential transition
