= Inauguration of Luiz Inácio Lula da Silva =

Inauguration of Luiz Inácio Lula da Silva may refer to:

- First inauguration of Luiz Inácio Lula da Silva, 2003, on the start of his first presidency
- Second inauguration of Luiz Inácio Lula da Silva, 2007
- Third inauguration of Luiz Inácio Lula da Silva, 2023, on the start of his second presidency
- Fourth inauguration of Luiz Inácio Lula da Silva, 2027 (upcoming)
