= Ivan Baron =

Ivan Baron may refer to:

- Ivan Baron (tennis) (born 1972), American tennis player
- Ivan Baron (activist) (born 1999), Brazilian influencer
