= Third inauguration of Luiz Inácio Lula da Silva =

2023 presidential inauguration of Luiz Inácio Lula da Silva
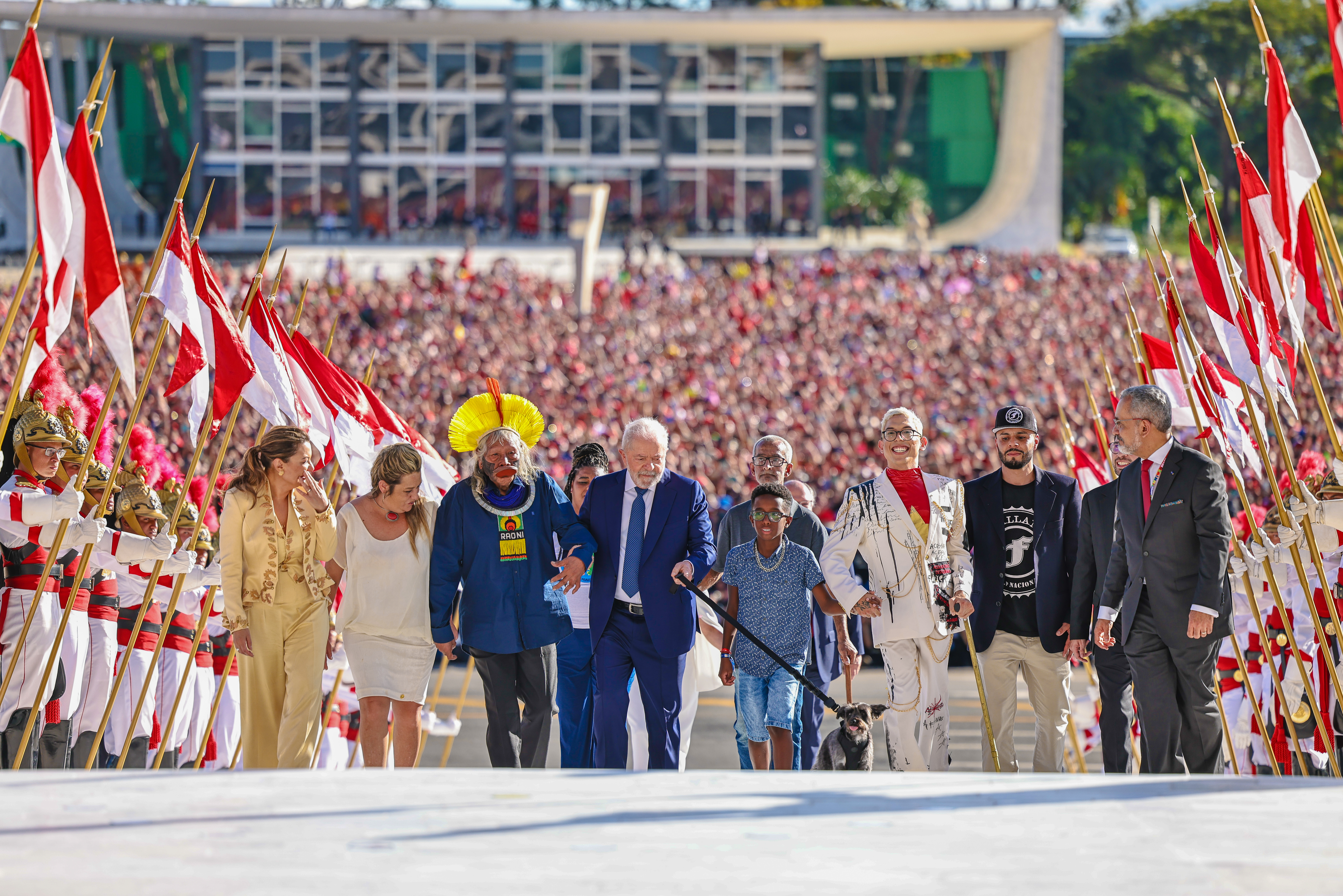
- Date: 1 January 2023; 3 years ago
- Time: 15:00 (BRT, UTC−03:00)
- Location: National Congress of Brazil Brasília, DF
- Participants: Luiz Inácio Lula da Silva; 35th and 39th president of Brazil; — Assuming office; Geraldo Alckmin; 26th vice president of Brazil; — Assuming office; Rodrigo Pacheco; President of the Federal Senate; — Administering oath; Arthur Lira; President of the Chamber of Deputies; — Administering oath; Rosa Weber; President of the Supreme Federal Court; — Administering oath

Luiz Inácio Lula da Silva and Geraldo Alckmin were inaugurated as 39th president of Brazil and 26th vice president, respectively, on 1 January 2023, in a ceremony held in the National Congress in Brasília, beginning the third Lula administration. At the age of 77, Lula became the oldest president-elect to assume office and the only president in Brazilian history to serve two non-consecutive terms in office through the democratic vote.

== Background ==
On 2 October, the day of the first round of voting in the 2022 general election, Lula placed first with 48.43% of the valid votes, with which he qualified for a runoff against incumbent Jair Bolsonaro, who garnered 43.20% of the valid votes. Lula was elected in the second round on 30 October, making him Brazil's first three-term president and the first since Getúlio Vargas to be elected for a non-consecutive term. He was inaugurated on 1 January 2023. In break with tradition, outgoing president Jair Bolsonaro did not attend his successor's inauguration and instead left Brazil for the U.S. state of Florida two days before the ceremony.

== Inaugural events ==
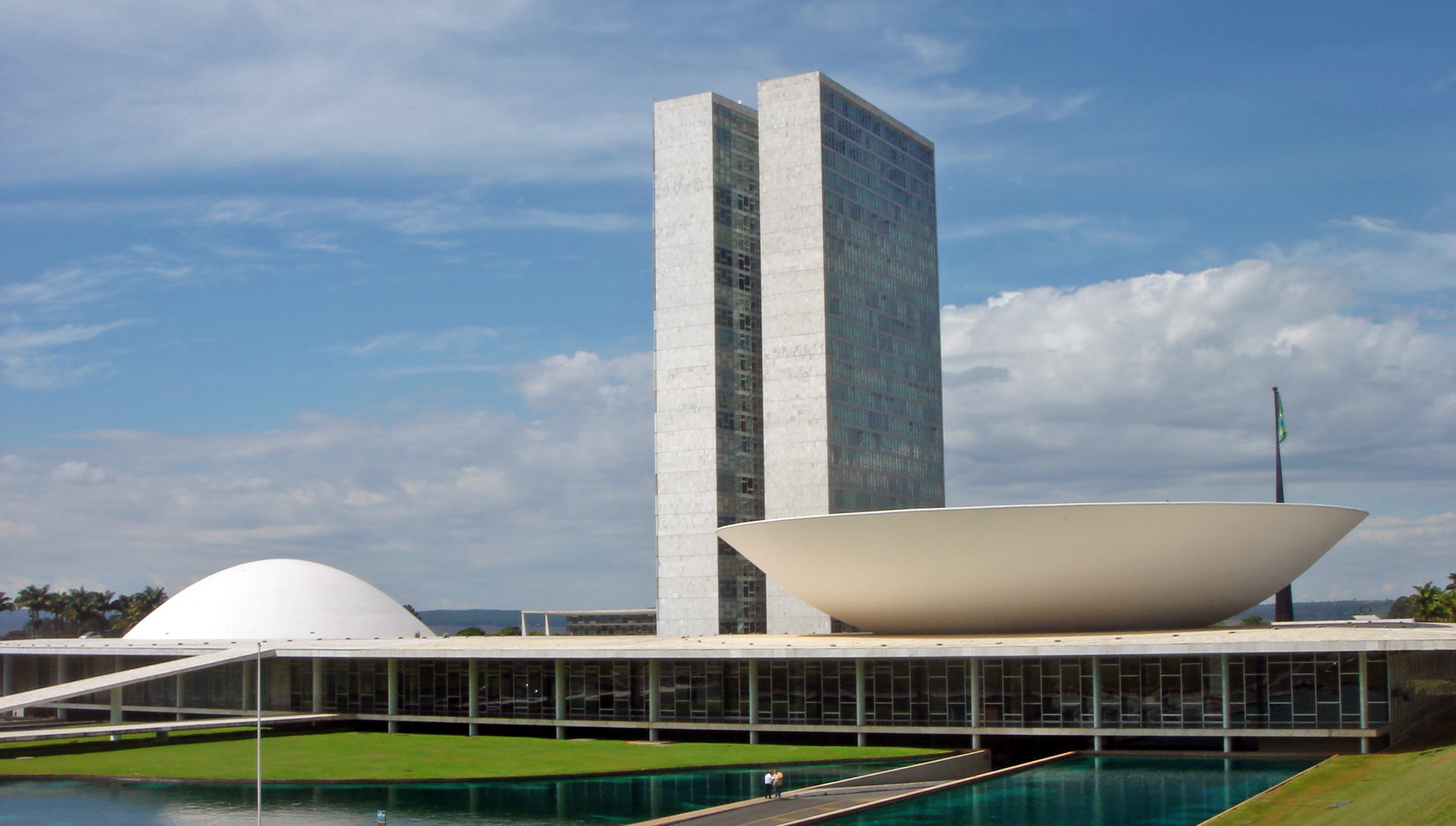
The National Congress of Brazil, where the presidential swearing-in ceremony took place.

The presidential inauguration ceremony took place in and outside the National Congress building. The President-elect and the Vice President-elect paraded in a Rolls-Royce Silver Wraith from the Brasília Cathedral to the Nereu Ramos Palace, where the presidential swearing-in oath took place during the joint congressional session. The Federal Senate TV channel as well as major brazilian TV channels such as TV Globo, Bandeirantes and SBT broadcast the inauguration ceremony.

The session was opened by Senator Rodrigo Pacheco, President of the National Congress (in his capacity as President of the Federal Senate), who declared a moment of silence for Pelé and Pope Benedict XVI, both of whom had died in the week prior. After the playing of the National anthem of Brazil, Lula and Alckmin took their respective oaths of office, after which First Secretary of the Chamber of Deputies Luciano Bivar read out the official record of the election and oaths of office. The record was signed by Lula, Alckmin, Pacheco, Bivar, Arthur Lira (President of the Chamber of Deputies), Minister Rosa Weber (President of the Supreme Federal Court) and Augusto Aras (Prosecutor General). Lula made a speech to accept his inauguration, and Pacheco subsequently spoke to affirm the commitment of Congress to working with the executive branch on key issues, after which he closed the session.

Guests in attendance at the joint session included former presidents José Sarney and Dilma Rousseff, Minister Alexandre de Moraes (President of the Superior Electoral Court), Minister Maria Thereza de Assis Moura (President of the Superior Court of Justice), and Minister Lélio Bentes Corrêa (President of the Superior Labor Court).

After the joint session, Lula, Alckmin and their spouses were paraded to the Palácio do Planalto, where they were joined at the ramp by several individuals selected from among Lula's voters by the presidential transition cabinet to represent the diversity of Brazil:

- Chief Raoni Metuktire, an indigenous leader and an activist for conservation of the Amazon
- Aline Sousa, a 33-year-old garbage collector and member of the National Movement of Waste Pickers (MNCR)
- Francisco Carlos do Nascimento e Silva, a 10-year-old swimmer from the outskirts of São Paulo
- Ivan Baron, a social media personality and a social justice activist from Rio Grande do Norte
- Murilo de Quadros Jesus, a teacher from Curitiba
- Jucimara Fausto dos Santos, a cook for the Association of Employees of the State University of Maringá and a member of the Free Lula movement
- Wesley Viesba Rodrigues Rocha, a metallurgist
- Flávio Pereira, an artisan and a member of the Free Lula movement

As Bolsonaro was not in attendance, the presidential sash was handed among the aforementioned and placed on Lula's shoulder by Sousa. Lula, Alckmin and their spouses then walked to the podium of the palace where Lula spoke to the nation. After the speech, the four then walked inside the building again to receive foreign state delegations. Afterward, Lula publicly signed executive orders rescinding several decrees from the Bolsonaro administration, including re-establishing gun control, restoring the Bolsa Família program, creating an exclusive cabinet for matters involving indigenous and minority affairs, combatting de-forestation in the Amazon and illegal mining, restoring the Amazon Fund and civil society participation in the National Environment Council (Conama).

=== Foreign attendance ===
External videos
- Lula's Presidential Inauguration Ceremony
- via YouTube
- Live: Presidential Inauguration Ceremony 2023 (1 January 2023), by TV Brasil Gov (in Portuguese)

Lula's third inauguration was attended by the largest number of foreign leaders at a presidential inauguration in Brazil's history, beating the then record held by Lula himself in his first inauguration as president back in 2003. Lula's third inauguration was also attended by more foreign leaders, Heads of State and Heads of Government than the Rio Olympic Games in 2016.

The following foreign ministers or higher-ranking officials attended Lula's inauguration:

- Algeria: President of the People's National Assembly Ibrahim Boughali
- Angola: President João Lourenço
- Argentina: President Alberto Fernández
- Azerbaijan: First Deputy Prime Minister Yaqub Eyyubov
- Bolivia: President Luis Arce
- Cameroon: Foreign Minister Lejeune Mbella Mbella
- Cape Verde: President José Maria Neves
- Chile: President Gabriel Boric
- China: Vice President Wang Qishan
- Colombia: President Gustavo Petro
- Costa Rica: Foreign Minister Arnoldo André Tinoco
- Cuba: Vice President Salvador Valdés Mesa
- Dominican Republic: President of the Chamber of Deputies Alfredo Pacheco
- Ecuador: President Guillermo Lasso
- Equatorial Guinea: Senate President Teresa Efua Asangono
- El Salvador: Vice President Félix Ulloa
- France: Minister Delegate in charge of Foreign Trade Olivier Becht
- Gabon: Foreign Minister Michael Moussa Adamo
- Germany: President Frank-Walter Steinmeier
- Guatemala: Foreign Minister Mario Búcaro
- Guinea: Chief of government Bernard Goumou
- Guinea-Bissau: President Umaro Sissoco Embaló
- Guyana: President Irfaan Ali
- Haiti: Foreign Minister Jean Victor Généus
- Honduras: President Xiomara Castro
- Iran: President of the Islamic Consultative Assembly Mohammad Bagher Ghalibaf
- Jamaica: Senate President Tom Tavares-Finson
- Japan: House of Representatives member Yūko Obuchi
- Kenya: Republic of Kenya Chief Minister (Prime Cabinet Secretary) Musalia Mudavadi
- Lesotho: Deputy Prime Minister Nthomeng Majara
- Mali: Chief of government Abdoulaye Maïga
- Mexico: Foreign Secretary Marcelo Ebrard and First Lady Beatriz Gutiérrez Müller
- Morocco: Prime Minister Aziz Akhannouch
- Mozambique: Assembly of the Republic President Esperança Bias
- Nicaragua: Foreign Minister Denis Moncada
- Palestine: Foreign Minister Riyad al-Maliki
- Panama: Vice President José Gabriel Carrizo
- Paraguay: President Mario Abdo Benítez
- Peru: Prime Minister Alberto Otárola
- Portugal: President Marcelo Rebelo de Sousa
- Russia: President of the Federation Council Valentina Matvienko
- Saint Vincent and the Grenadines: Prime Minister Ralph Gonsalves
- Saudi Arabia: Foreign Minister Faisal bin Farhan Al Saud
- Serbia: President of National Assembly Vladimir Orlić
- Singapore: Minister in the Prime Minister's Office Maliki Osman
- Spain: King Felipe VI, Second Deputy Prime Minister Yolanda Díaz and Minister of Foreign Affairs José Manuel Albares
- South Africa: Foreign Minister Naledi Pandor
- South Korea: Leader of the ruling People Power Party Chung Jin-suk
- Suriname: President Chan Santokhi
- Timor-Leste: President José Ramos-Horta
- Togo: President Faure Gnassingbé
- Turkey: Foreign Minister Mevlüt Çavuşoğlu
- Ukraine: Deputy Prime Minister Yulia Svyrydenko
- United Kingdom: Secretary of State for Environment, Food and Rural Affairs Thérèse Coffey
- United States: Secretary of Interior Deb Haaland
- Uruguay: President Luis Lacalle Pou
- Venezuela: National Assembly President Jorge Rodríguez
- Zimbabwe: President Emmerson Mnangagwa

=== International organizations officials ===
In addition to government representatives, the following senior international organizations officials also attended Lula's third inauguration as president:

- Amazon Cooperation Treaty Organization (ACTO) – Secretary General Maria Jacqueline Mendoza Ortega
- Inter-American Development Bank (IDB) – President Ilan Goldfajn
- Latin American Integration Association (ALADI) – Secretary General Alejandro de la Peña
- Community of Portuguese Language Countries – Executive Secretary Zacarias da Costa

== Planning ==
=== Security ===
The inauguration had more reinforced security than previous inaugurations, with approximately 700 federal police, a bomb squad, plainclothes agents and equipment that neutralize the drone signal and prevent overflights in the event area.

=== Pre and post-inaugural events ===
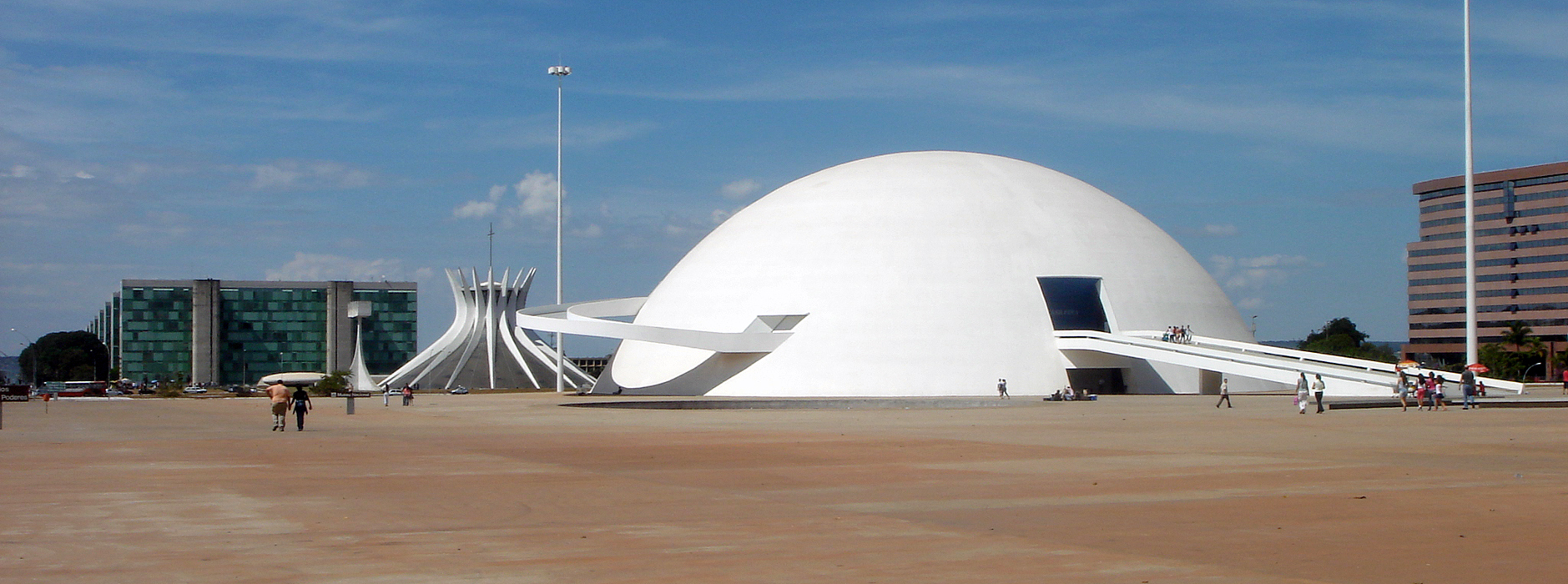
The National Museum of the Republic hosted an art exhibition as part of the Festival of Future events.

The Festival do Futuro (Festival of Future) cultural festival was held in the same location of the Three Powers Plaza from 10:00 Brasília Time (UTC−03:00) on 1 January until the official inaugural events opened (around 13:00). It resumed at 15:30 on the same day when the transfer of power officially ended, and concluded on the next day morning at 04:00. The festival events which included several concerts, an art exhibition featuring Brazilian culture artworks in the National Museum of the Republic and a gastronomy festival displaying the Brazilian cuisine were attended by approximately 300,000 people.

== See also ==
- First inauguration of Luiz Inácio Lula da Silva
- Second inauguration of Luiz Inácio Lula da Silva
