= List of ambassadors appointed by Lula da Silva =

On its Article 61, the Constitution of Brazil defines that the President of Brazil is the high responsible for the country's internal and foreign affairs being, therefore, one of his attributions the appointments of ambassadors and other diplomatic offices. The ambassadors of Brazil are the main representatives of the Brazilian government's interests in diplomatic dealings with other nations and their appointment by the President must be followed by an approval of the Senate Foreign Affairs and National Defense Commission.

In his third presidential term, Luiz Inácio Lula da Silva appointed new ambassadors for many Brazilian diplomatic missions abroad. On 22 March 2023, the Federal Senate formally received the appointment of 7 ambassadors from the Planalto Palace with the prediction that 13 appointments would be sent in a long term.

== Color key ==
- Announced appointees not yet sent to the Senate.
- Appointees pending confirmation by the Senate.
- Appointees confirmed by the Senate.

== Ambassadors to foreign states ==
=== Africa ===
Country	Nominee	Assumed office	Left office
Botswana	João Genésio de Almeida Filho	TBD (Confirmed 4 July 2023)	—
Egypt — Eritrea	Paulino de Carvalho Neto	TBD (Confirmed 17 May 2023)	—
Malawi — Zambia	Arthur Villanova Nogueira	TBD (Confirmed 31 May 2023)	—
Morocco	Alexandre Lopes Parola	TBD (Confirmed 4 July 2023)	—

=== Americas ===
Country	Nominee	Assumed office	Left office
Argentina	Julio Glinternick Bitelli	15 July 2023 (Confirmed 17 May 2023)	—
Canada	Carlos Alberto França	TBD (Confirmed 2 August 2023)	—
Cuba	Christian Vargas	7 July 2023 (Confirmed 23 May 2023)	—
Dominican Republic	Carlos Coutinho Perez	Announced 14 July 2023	—
Peru	Clemente Baena Soares	TBD (Confirmed 24 May 2023)	—
United States	Maria Luiza Ribeiro Viotti	30 June 2023 (Confirmed 17 May 2023)	—

=== Asia ===
Country	Nominee	Assumed office	Left office
Bahrain	Adriano Silva Pucci	September 2023 (Confirmed 4 July 2023)	—
India — Bhutan	Kenneth Haczynski da Nóbrega	21 August 2023 (Confirmed 17 May 2023)	—
Indonesia	George Monteiro Prata	TBD (Confirmed 31 May 2023)	—
Iran	Eduardo Gradilone Neto	Announced 30 May 2023	—
Israel	Frederico Salomão Meyer	TBD (Confirmed 23 May 2023)	—
Myanmar	Gustavo Rocha de Menezes	Announced 20 June 2023	—
Oman	Alfredo Martinho Leoni	Announced 25 May 2023	—
Philippines	Gilberto Guimarães de Moura	Announced 30 June 2023	—
Qatar	Marcelo Loures da Costa	Announced 10 July 2023	—

=== Europe ===
Country	Nominee	Assumed office	Left office
Bosnia and Herzegovina	Maria Clara Duclos Carisio	Announced 5 July 2023	—
Bulgaria — North Macedonia	Paulo Tarrisse da Fontoura	Announced 26 May 2023	—
Croatia	Silvana Polich	TBD (Confirmed 4 July 2023)	—
France — Monaco	Ricardo Neiva Tavares	26 May 2023 (Confirmed 17 May 2023)	—
Greece	Paulo Castilhos França	TBD (Confirmed 24 May 2023)	—
Holy See	Everton Vieira Vargas		—
Italy – Malta – San Marino	Renato Mosca de Souza	TBD (Confirmed 21 June 2023)	—
Netherlands	Fernando Simas Magalhães	6 September 2023 (Confirmed 31 May 2023)	—
Romania	Ricardo Guerra de Araújo	TBD (Confirmed 21 June 2023)	—
United Kingdom	Antonio Patriota	TBD (Confirmed 21 June 2023)	—

=== Oceania ===
Country	Nominee	Assumed office	Left office
Australia — Fiji — Nauru — Papua New Guinea — Solomon Islands — Vanuatu	Claudio de Matos Arruda	TBD (Confirmed 6 July 2023)	—

== Ambassadors to international organizations ==
Country	Nominee	Assumed office	Left office
United Nations	Sérgio França Danese	6 July 2023 (Confirmed 17 May 2023)	—
International Civil Aviation Organization	Michel Arslanian Neto	TBD (Confirmed 24 May 2023)	—
International Atomic Energy Agency	Claudia Vieira Santos	TBD (Confirmed 4 July 2023)	—
World Trade Organization	Guilherme de Aguiar Patriota	TBD (Confirmed 24 May 2023)	—
Organization of American States	Benoni Belli	26 July 2023 (Confirmed 24 May 2023)	—

== See also ==
- Ministry of Foreign Affairs
