= Fourth inauguration of Luiz Inácio Lula da Silva =

2027 presidential inauguration of Luiz Inácio Lula da Silva
- Date: 5 January 2027
- Time: TBA (BRT, UTC−03:00)
- Location: National Congress of Brazil Brasília, DF
- Participants: Luiz Inácio Lula da Silva; 35th and 39th president of Brazil; — Assuming office; Geraldo Alckmin; 26th vice president of Brazil; — Assuming office; Davi Alcolumbre; President of the Federal Senate; — Administering oath; Hugo Motta; President of the Chamber of Deputies; — Administering oath; Edson Fachin; President of the Supreme Federal Court; — Administering oath

Luiz Inácio Lula da Silva and Geraldo Alckmin, re-elected in the 2026 Brazilian presidential election, will be inaugurated as president of Brazil and vice president, respectively, on Tuesday, 5 January 2027, in a ceremony to be held in the Ulysses Guimarães Plenary of the National Congress in Brasília, beginning the fourth Lula administration. Lula will take the oath of office as president that day, and Alckmin will take the oath of office as vice president. At the age of 81, Lula will extend his own record as the oldest person to be inaugurated as president.

== Background ==
In the first round of the 2026 general election, Lula finished second with 45.16% of the valid votes, behind senator Flávio Bolsonaro, who received 47.03%. The two met in a runoff on 25 October, which Lula won with 51.79% of the valid votes. He became Brazil’s first four-term president and the first candidate in the country’s history to win a presidential runoff after finishing second in the first round.

The 2027 inauguration will be the first held under Constitutional Amendment No. 111, promulgated by the National Congress on 28 September 2021, which moved the start of the presidential term from 1 January to 5 January. Since the 1988 Constitution came into force, presidents had always taken office on New Year’s Day, a date that made it difficult for foreign heads of state and other guests to attend. The amendment also moved the inauguration of state governors to 6 January.
