= Ivan Baron (activist) =

Brazilian activist and influencer (born 1999)

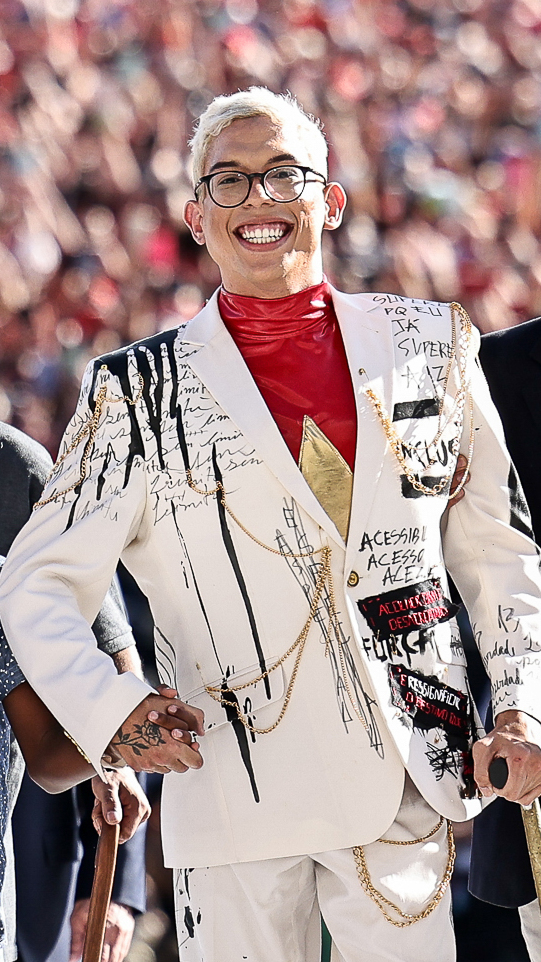
- Born: Ivan Baron; January 23, 1999 (age 27); Rio Grande do Norte, Brazil
- Occupations: Activist; Influencer; Educator

Ivan Baron (born January 23, 1999, Natal) is a influencer and anti-ableist activist from Rio Grande do Norte, with a degree in pedagogy. He became notable for his work on social media advocating and promoting policies for the inclusion of people with disabilities. Baron has cerebral palsy resulting from a viral meningitis he contracted at age 3 due to a case of food poisoning. He began his activism in 2018.

He took part in the delivery of the presidential sash during the inauguration of Luiz Inácio Lula da Silva in 2023. Baron stated that his participation came from an invitation made by the First Lady Rosângela Lula da Silva. In addition, he was an accessibility consultant for the Festival do Futuro at the inauguration celebration. In February, Baron was announced by Ethel Maciel, Secretary of Health Surveillance and Environment of the Ministry of Health, as ambassador of the National Vaccination Campaign.

== Political criticism ==
Although he took part in the inauguration ceremony of President Luiz Inácio Lula da Silva, throughout 2024 Baron voiced harsh criticism of the government, reporting that his administration was making access to the BPC more bureaucratic and difficult. In his words, Baron wrote:

For people to be benefited, or to continue having the right, they practically need to be in situations of misery, because neither they nor their family members can work, and this violates dignity. (Ivan Baron, 2024)

On a previous occasion, Baron had already harshly criticized President Lula for a statement he considered ableist and unnecessary, involving the fact that Lula had linked beauty to not using crutches or walkers.

Baron identifies as pansexual.
