= List of executive orders by Lula da Silva =

The following is a list of executive orders signed by President Luiz Inácio Lula da Silva.

Many of these decrees are called measures (medidas), provisional measures (medidas provisórias) or revocations (revogaços).

== Third presidency (2023–2027) ==
Number	Title	Explanation	Date	Notes
1	Measure which provides for the organization of the presidency of the republic and ministries		1 January 2023	
2	Provisional Measure of R$600 for poor families of Brazil			
3	Provisional Measure for fuel exemption			
4	Armaments Decree			
5	Combating Deforestation			
6	Amazon Fund			
7	Illegal Mining	The President of the Republic revokes the decree that encouraged illegal mining in the Amazon, indigenous lands and Environmental protection areas		
8	Inclusion of people with disabilities in education	The President of the Republic edits the Decree that extinguishes segregation and guarantees the fundamental right of young children and adults with disabilities in education.		
9	Social participation, reinforcing the commitment to participatory democracy	The President of the Republic signs a decree that removes impediments to social participation in the construction and definition of public policies.		
10	Secrecy	The President of the Republic signs an order that determines that the Controller General of the Union reassess decisions made within 30 days that imposed undue secrecy on public administration information and documents.		
11	Privatization	The President of the Republic signs an order that determines that ministers of state withdraw from the privatization process for public companies such as Petrobras, Correios and EBC.		
12	Declaration in honor of the memory of Diogo Santana	The President of the Republic signs an order that determines that the Minister of State, the head of the General Secretariat of the President of the Republic, prepare for the recreation of		
13	CONAMA	The President of the Republic signs an order that determines that the minister of state for environment and climate change should propose new regulations for CONAMA within 45 days to the National Council on the Environment		
