= First inauguration of Luiz Inácio Lula da Silva =

2003 induction of the president of Brazil

2003 presidential inauguration of Luiz Inácio Lula da Silva
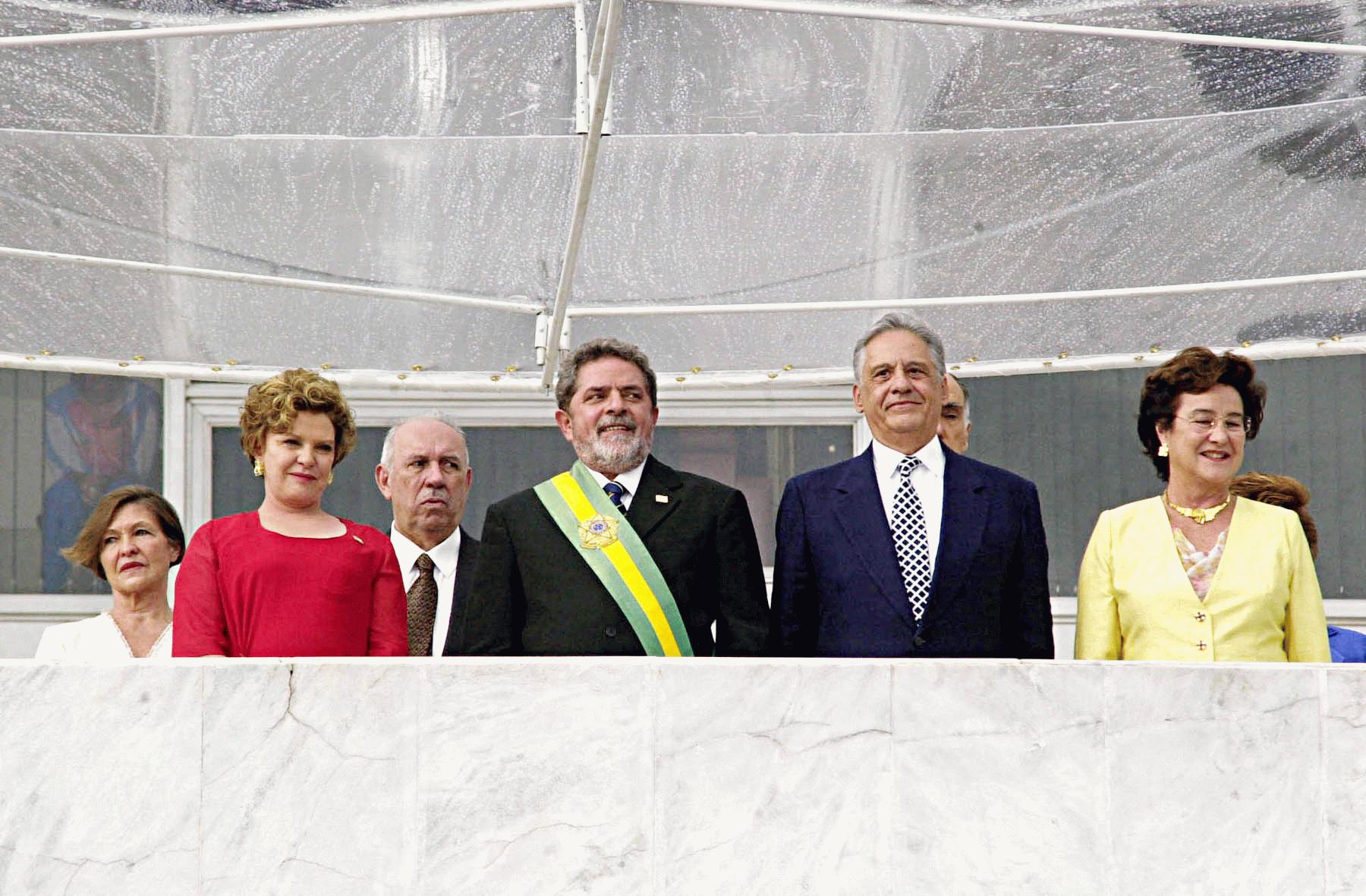
- President Luiz Inácio Lula da Silva and First Lady Marisa Letícia, beside former President Fernando Henrique Cardoso and former First Lady Ruth Cardoso at the Planalto Palace parlatorium in the inauguration on 1 January 2003.
- Date: 1 January 2003; 23 years ago
- Time: 3:00 pm (BRST)
- Location: National Congress of Brazil Brasília, DF
- Participants: Luiz Inácio Lula da Silva; 35th president of Brazil — Assuming office José Alencar; 23rd vice president of Brazil — Assuming office Ramez Tebet; President of the Federal Senate — Administering oath

Luiz Inácio Lula da Silva and José Alencar were inaugurated as 35th president of Brazil and 23rd vice president, respectively, on 1 January 2003, in a ceremony held in the National Congress in Brasília, beginning the new Lula administration. In this occasion, it was the first time since redemocratization in 1985 that a president elect by the direct vote delivered the presidential sash to his successor also elected by the direct vote.

== Foreign attendance ==
The following representatives or higher-rank officials attended Lula's inauguration:

- Argentina – President Eduardo Duhalde
- Bolivia – President Gonzalo Sánchez de Lozada
- Canada – MP for Kingston and the Islands and Speaker of the House of Commons Peter Milliken and MP for Edmonton–Strathcoma Rahim Jaffer
- Chile – President Ricardo Lagos
- Cuba – President Fidel Castro
- Ecuador – President-elect Lucio Gutierrez
- France – Secretary of State for Tourism Léon Bertrand
- Guyana – Prime Minister Sam Hinds
- Guinea-Bissau – Prime Minister Mário Pires
- Mozambique – President Joaquim Chissano
- Paraguay – President Luis González Macchi
- Peru – President Alejandro Toledo
- Portugal – President Jorge Sampaio
- Spain – Heir Prince Felipe VI
- Sweden – Prime Minister Göran Persson
- United States – U.S. Trade Representative Robert Zoellick, Senior Director for Western Hemisphere Affairs John Maisto and U.S. Senator from Wyoming Mike Enzi
- Uruguay – President Jorge Batlle
- Venezuela – President Hugo Chávez
