= Argentina presidential transition =

Argentina has faced several presidential transitions since the return of democracy in 1983.

Reynaldo Bignone, the last military dictator of the National Reorganization Process, gave the presidential sash and staff to the elected president Raúl Alfonsín on December 10, 1983. The ceremony took place at the Casa Rosada.

A big economic crisis caused by an hyperinflation forces Alfonsín to resign during the transition. Carlos Menem, who was scheduled to take office on December 10, 1989, does so on July 8. The ceremony took place in the Casa Rosada. Menem was reelected in 1995, and only made the oath of office at the Congress, already wearing the sash and staff.

Fernando de la Rúa became president in 1999. He made the oath of office in the Congress, and then moved to the Casa Rosada, where Menem gave him the sash and the staff.

De la Rúa resigned in 2001, two years before ending his term, amid a huge economic crisis. The Congress appointed Adolfo Rodríguez Saá, and then Eduardo Duhalde when Rodríguez Saá resigned. The next elected president was Néstor Kirchner, in 2003. The ceremony took place completely in the Congress, as Duhalde had been appointed by it.

Néstor Kirchner refused to run for a re-election, and his wife Cristina Fernández de Kirchner was elected president in 2007. They returned to the standard system: oath of office in the Congress, and exchange of sash and staff in the Casa Rosada. Néstor died in 2010 and she was later reelected the following year. The ceremony took place completely in the Congress. She received the sash and staff from her daughter Florencia Kirchner, who did not held any political office. She made the oath of office in the name of God, the nation and "him", in reference to the late Kirchner.

Mauricio Macri was elected president in 2015. Cristina Fernández de Kirchner wanted to make the ceremony in the Congress, and Macri in the Casa Rosada. Ultimately, she refused to take part in the ceremony, at either place.

== Gallery ==
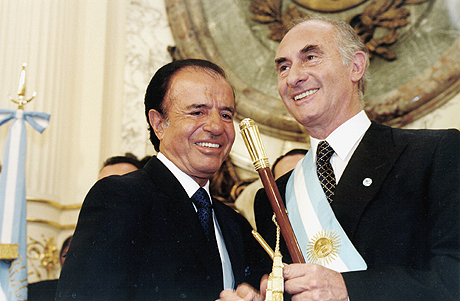
Outgoing President Carlos Menem with President–elect Fernando de la Rúa in 1999

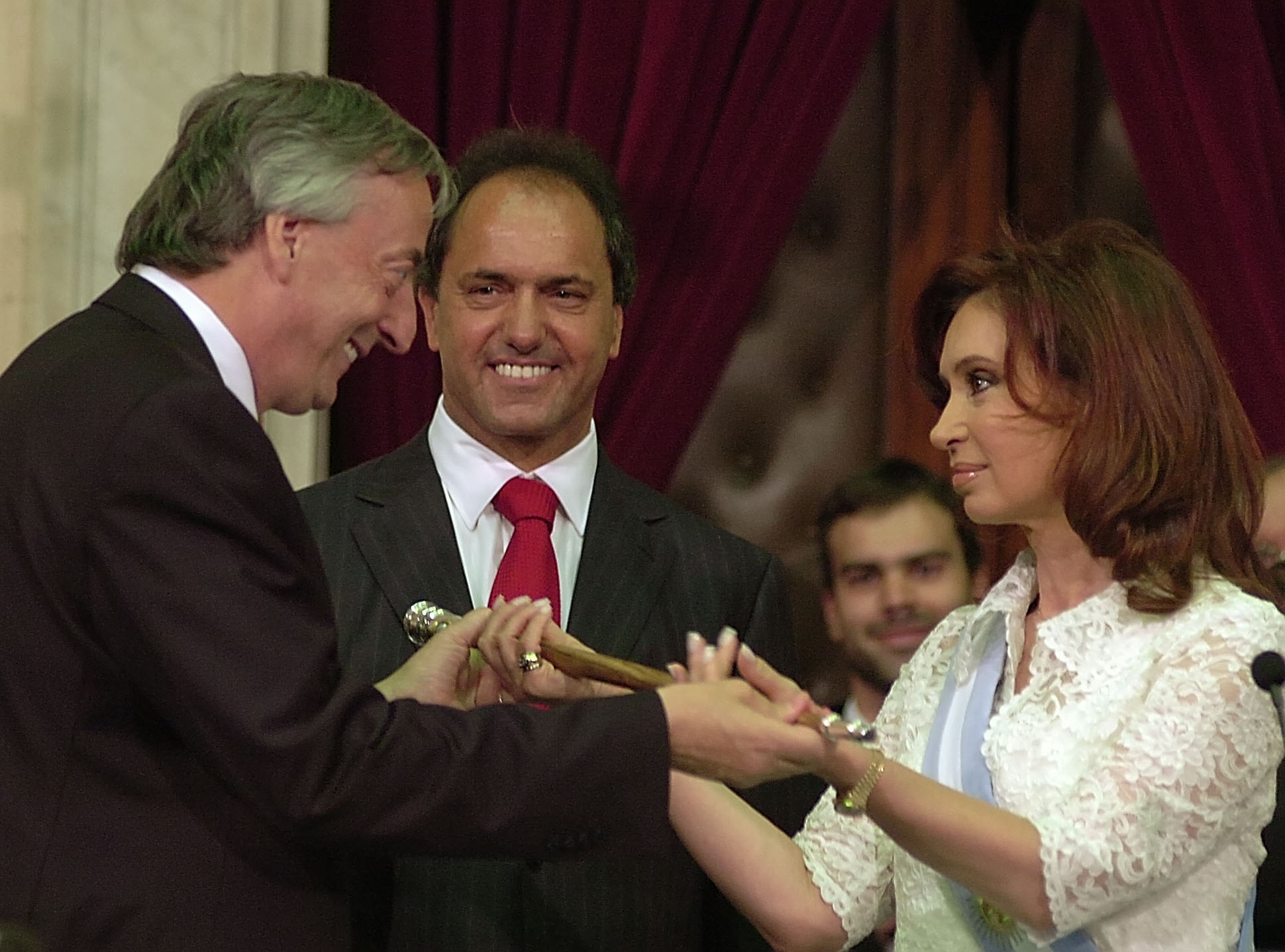
President–elect and outgoing First Lady Cristina Fernández de Kirchner receives the presidential sash and staff from her husband, outgoing president Néstor Kirchner in 2007.

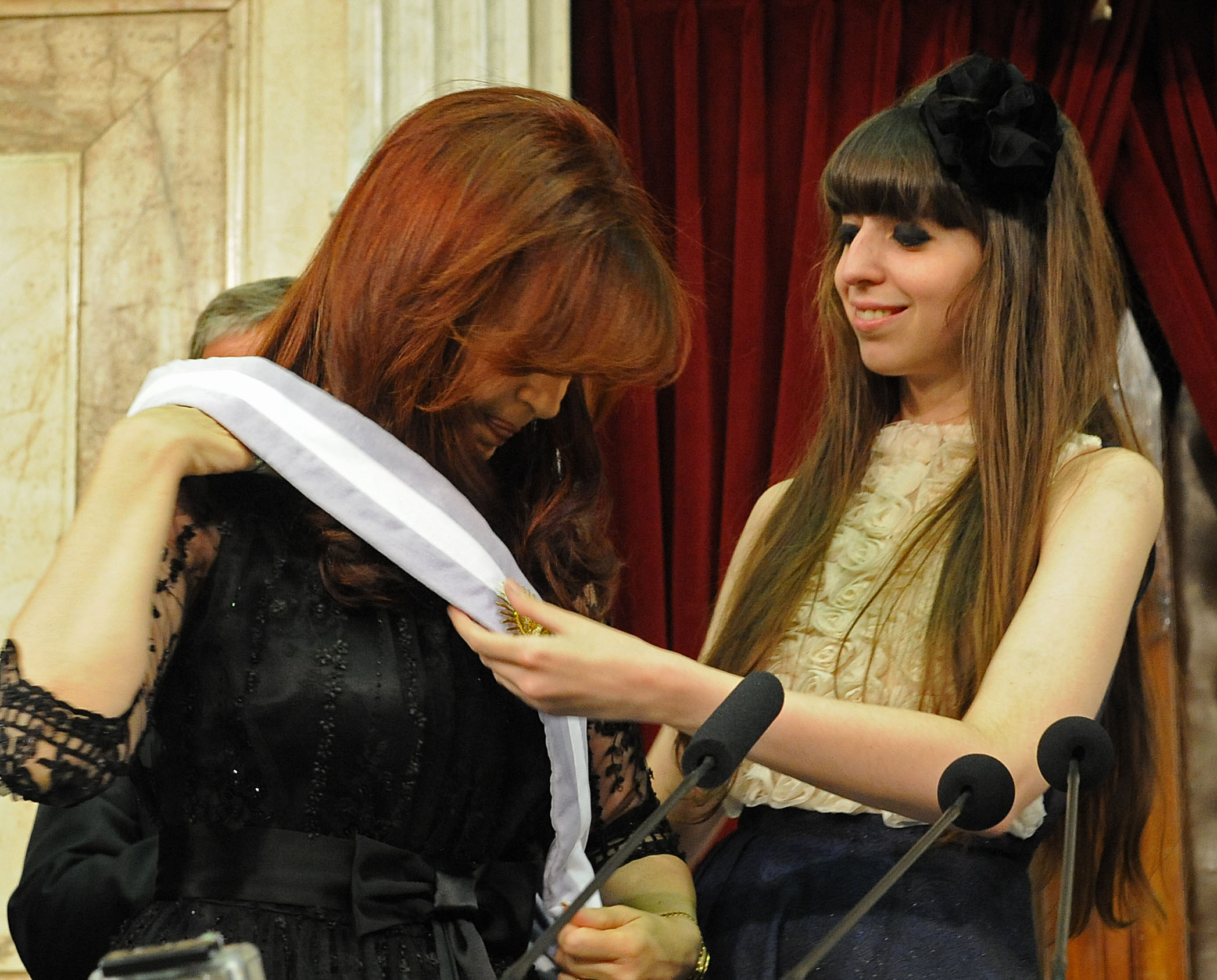
President Cristina Fernández de Kirchner receives the presidential sash from her daughter Florencia (who did not held any political office) in 2011

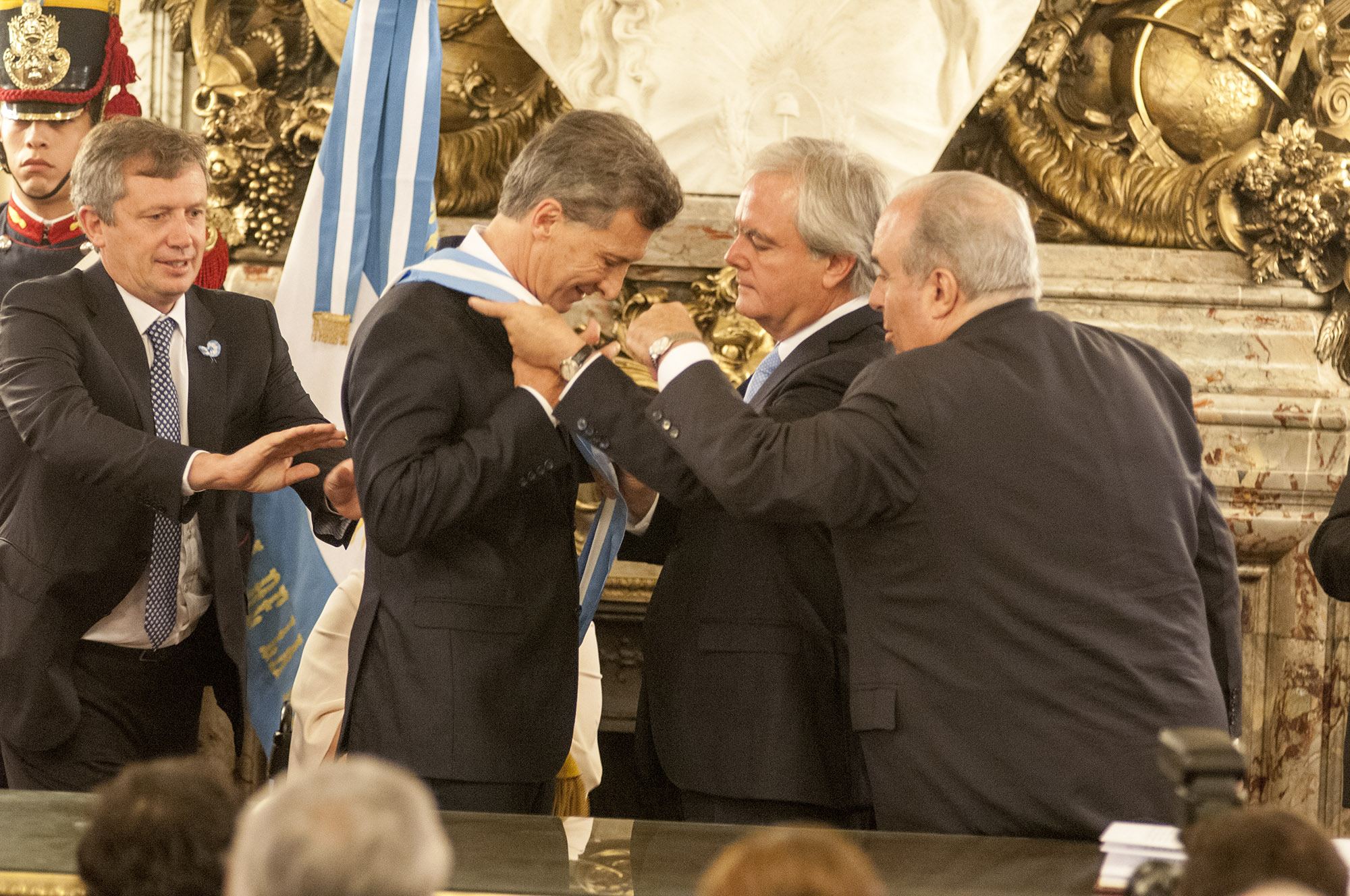
President–elect Mauricio Macri receives the presidential sash and staff from Provisional President of the Senate Federico Pinedo, instead of outgoing president Cristina Fernández de Kirchner in 2015

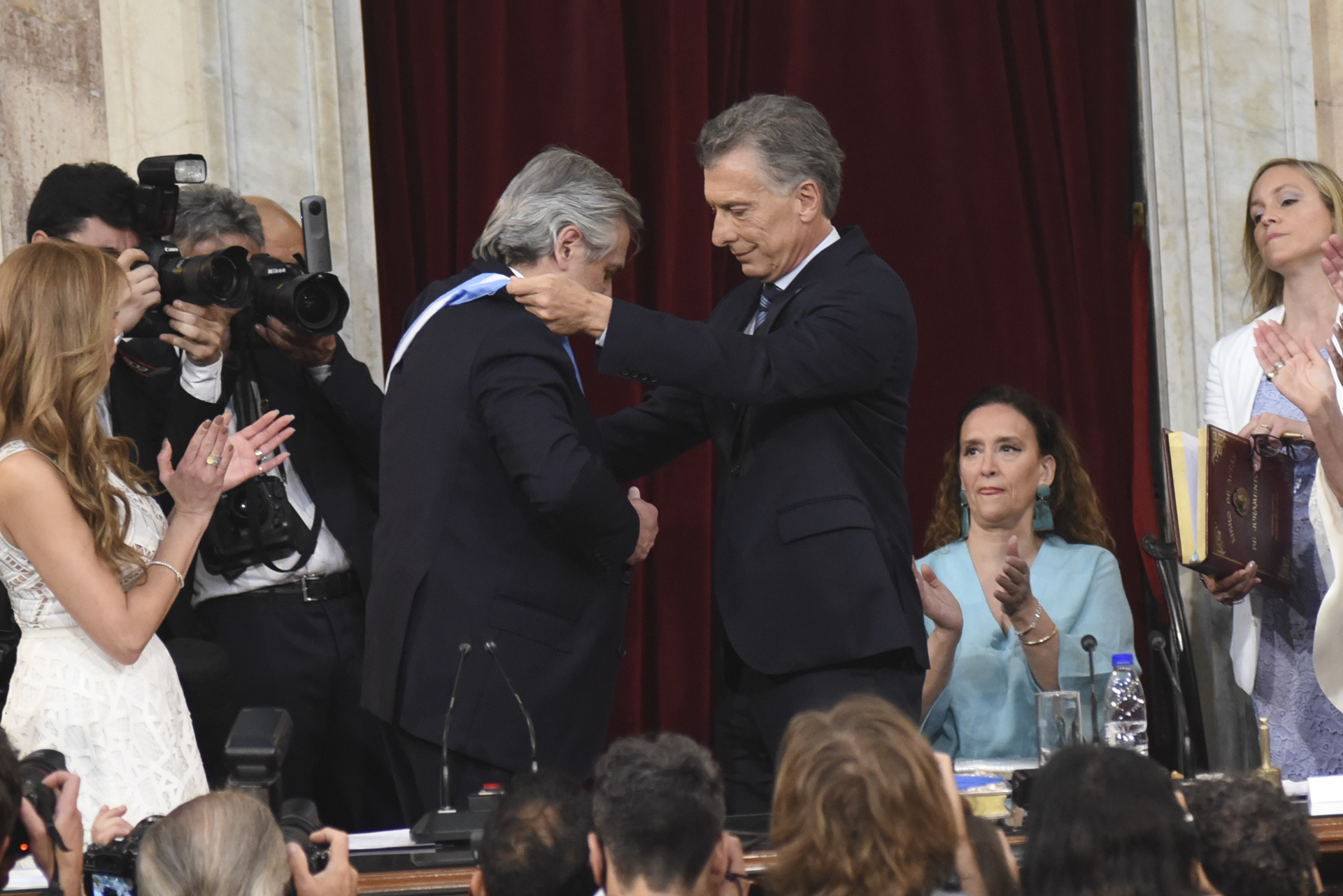
President–elect Alberto Fernández receives the presidential sash and staff from outgoing president Mauricio Macri in 2019

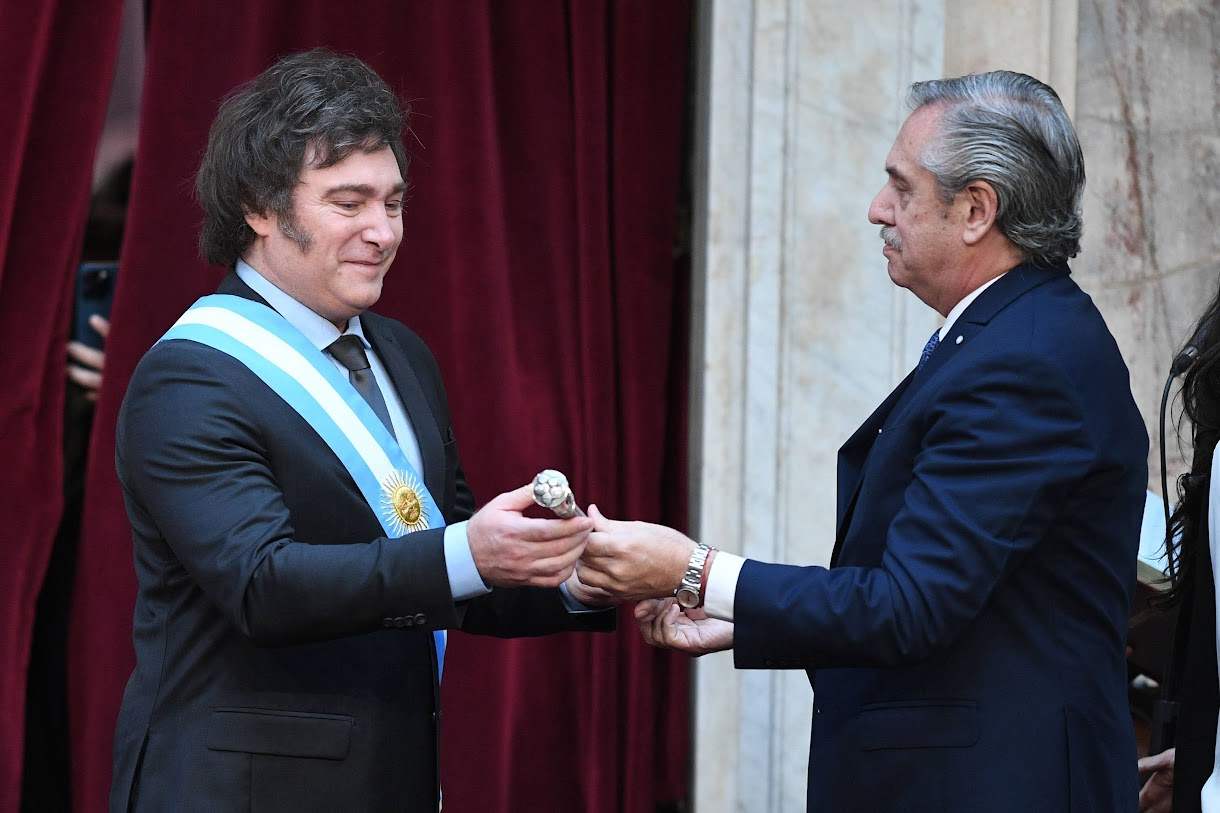
President–elect Javier Milei receives the presidential sash and staff from outgoing president Alberto Fernández in 2023
