= Spanish prime-ministerial transition =

The Spanish prime-ministerial transition is a procedure by which the Prime Minister assumes the role of head of the government. In Spanish politics, the prime minister is officially known as "President of the Government", so, although rarely used due to Spain being a parliamentary monarchy, the term "presidential transition" it would be more appropriate.

As a summary, the procedure is as follows: after a general election, the monarch proposes a candidate to the Congress of Deputies and, if the candidate is able to secure the confidence of the Lower House, the sovereign appoints that person as prime minister.

== Election ==
In Spain, the prime minister is elected not by the people but for the Congress of Deputies. In the general election, the different parties present a closed list of candidates to the Congress and people vote for each party and the full list. Normally, each party has their own candidate to premiership, which is normally the leader of the closed list and the party. When the results come out, each party (if it has enough votes) wins seats (escaños) on the Congress in proportion to the number of votes.

Following the general election of the Cortes Generales, and other circumstances provided for in the Constitution, the monarch meets with and interviews the leaders of the political parties represented in the Congress of Deputies, and then consults with the President of the Congress of Deputies (who represents the whole of the Cortes Generales and it is elected from within the members of parliament) before nominating his candidate for the premiership, according to Section 99 of Title IV of the Spanish Constitution. Often minor parties form part of a larger major party, and through that membership it can be said that the king fulfills his constitutional mandate of consulting with party representatives with Congressional representation.

Title IV Government and Administration Section 99(1) & (2)

- (1) After each renewal of the Congress and the other cases provided for under the Constitution, the King shall, after consultation with the representatives appointed by the political groups with parliamentary representation, and through the Speaker of the Congress, nominate for the Presidency of the Government.
- (2) The candidate nominated in accordance with the provisions of the foregoing subsection shall submit to the Congress the political program of the Government he or she intends to form and shall seek the confidence of the House.

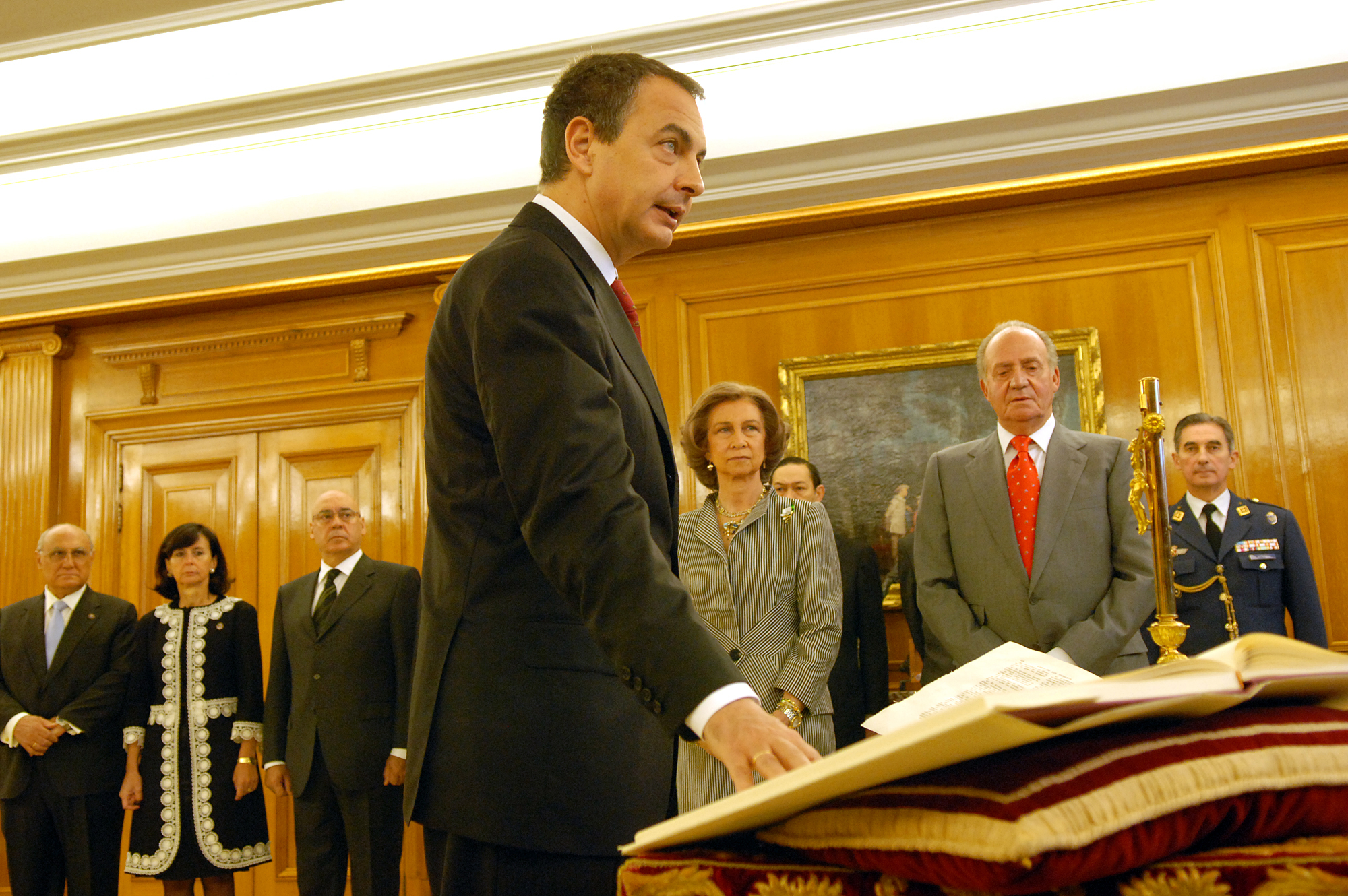
Incoming prime minister Zapatero takes the oath of office in front of King Juan Carlos I.

After the Congress confirmation, the President of the Congress informs the monarch that the candidate has gathered enough votes and therefore has the confidence of Parliament. The monarch then appoints the candidate as the new President of the Government. The sovereing's decree of appointment is countersigned by the President of the Congress. During the inauguration ceremony performed in the presence of the king, customarily at the Salón de Audiencias in the Zarzuela Palace, the prime minister–designate of takes an oath of office over an open Constitution and next to the Bible, although since the reign of Felipe VI, the prime minister–designate has been free to choose whether to swear on religious symbols, something the current prime minister, Pedro Sánchez, has chosen not to do.

== Prime ministers ==
=== Acting prime minister ===
The acting prime minister is the head of government that remains in office until the next prime minister is sworn in or the current acting prime minister is re-elected. The acting prime minister does not have to be an outgoing prime minister, however, its powers are limited by the Constitution.

=== Outgoing prime minister ===
The outgoing prime minister not presenting for re-election remains in office in a caretaker capacity until their successor is sworn in. However, his powers are limited because his official term finished the day that he convoked the general election. In this way, many decisions are reserved for a full-capacity prime minister.

An example of this was the 2011 general election, when outgoing prime minister José Luis Rodríguez Zapatero did not run for re-election and he took care of the office until the newly appointed prime minister, Mariano Rajoy, was sworn in.

=== Prime minister–designate ===
The term "prime minister-elected" is not proper to the parliamentary system because the prime minister is not elected directly by the people but for the Congress. The term can be used unofficial if the biggest party has an absolute majority on the Congress or has the support of other party, which indicates that the candidate, although he has not been directly elected, he will overcome the congressional confirmation (Investidura). The most appropriate it would be "prime minister–designate", because the Congress proposes the king a prime minister.

== Powers transition ==
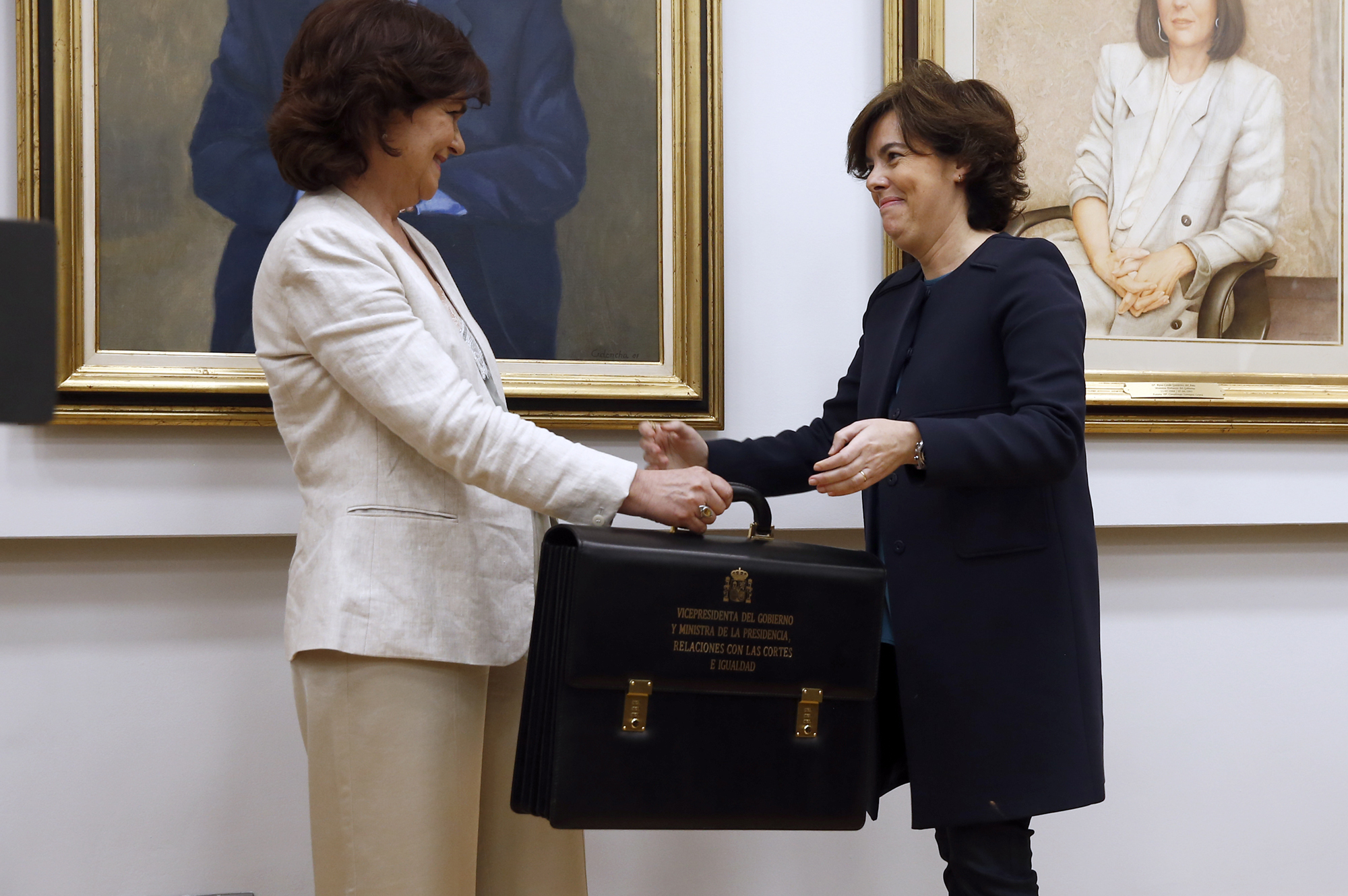
Outgoing Deputy PM Sáenz de Santamaría giving the briefcase to the incoming Deputy PM Calvo.

After the prime minister's confirmation in the Congress, he becomes the official Prime Minister. The powers transition is merely a ceremonial act. The new prime minister normally meets the outgoing prime minister at the Moncloa Palace (prime-ministerial residence and workplace) and after a conversation, they go to the main door in front of the media and the outgoing prime minister gives the new prime minister the presidential briefcase as a symbol of a transition of power. The Ministers of the Crown do the same with their respective briefcases.

== See also ==
- Prime Minister of Spain
- Government of Spain
