= 2000 São Paulo mayoral election =

- October 1, 2000 (first round); October 29, 2000 (second round)
- Turnout: 84.84%
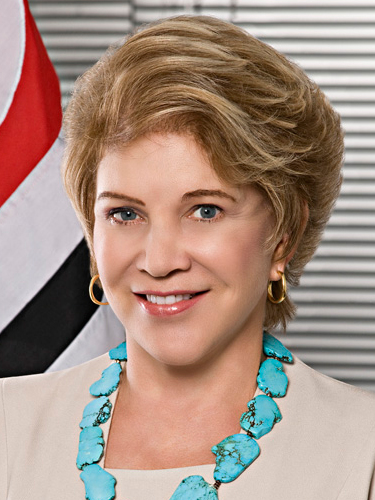

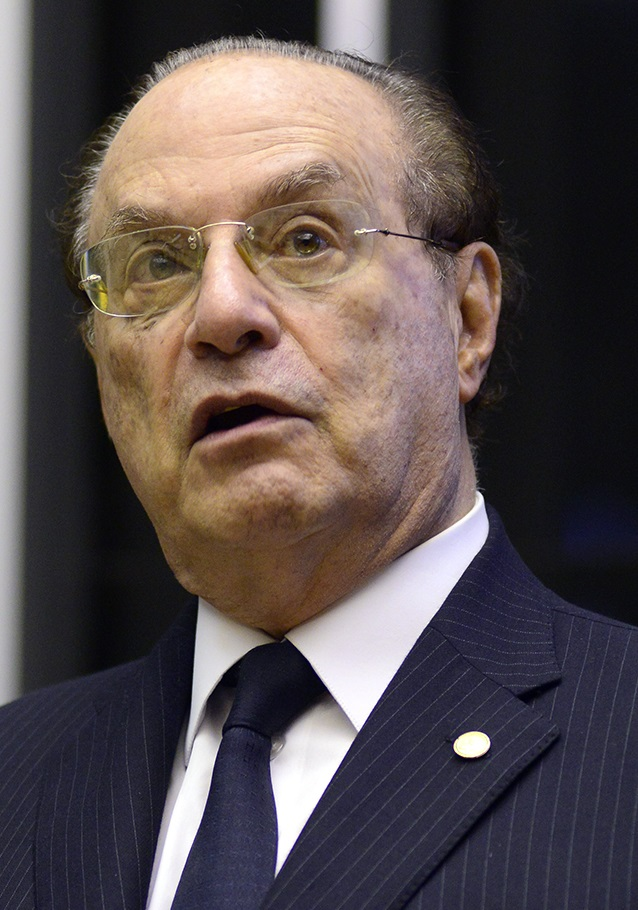
Candidate	Marta Suplicy	Paulo Maluf
Party	PT	PP
Running mate	Hélio Bicudo	Cunha Bueno
Popular vote	3,248,115	2,303,623
Percentage	58.51%	41.49%
- Marta Suplicy
Mayor before election
Celso Pitta
PTN
Elected mayor
Marta Suplicy
PT

The 2000 São Paulo municipal election took place in the city of São Paulo, with the first round taking place on 1 October 2000 and the second round taking place on 29 October 2000. Voters voted to elect the mayor, the vice Mayor, and 55 City Councillors for the administration of the city. The Result was a 2nd round victory for Marta Suplicy of the Worker's Party (PT), winning 3,248,115 votes and a share of 58,51% of the popular vote, defeating Paulo Maluf of the Progressistas (PPB), who took 2,303,623 votes and a share of 41,49% of the popular vote.

== Candidates ==
=== Candidates in runoff ===
#	Party/coalition	Mayoral candidate	Political office(s)	Vice-Mayoral candidate
11	Brazilian Progressive Party (PPB)	Paulo Maluf (PPB)	Mayor of São Paulo 1993–97, 1969–71; Federal Deputy from São Paulo 1983–87; Governor of São Paulo 1979–82; President of the Federal Savings Bank 1967–69	Cunha Bueno (PPB)
13	"Change São Paulo"; PT, PCdoB, PHS, PCB	Marta Suplicy (PT)	Federal Deputy from São Paulo 1995–99	Hélio Bicudo (PT)

=== Candidates failing to make runoff ===
#	Party/coalition	Mayoral candidate	Political office(s)	Vice-Mayoral candidate
16	United Socialist Workers' Party (PSTU)	Fábio Bosco (PSTU)	No prior office	José Geraldo (PSTU)
19	"São Paulo Demands Respect/Voice of the People"; PTN, PST	José Masci de Abreu (PTN)	Federal Deputy from São Paulo 1995–2003	Maria José (PTN)
20	"React São Paulo"; PSC, PTdoB	José Maria Marin (PSC)	Governor of São Paulo 1982–83; Vice Governor of São Paulo 1979–82; State Deputy of São Paulo 1971–79; City Councillor of São Paulo 1964–70	Elaine Prado (PSC)
22	Liberal Party (PL)	Marcos Cintra (PL)	Federal Deputy from São Paulo 1999–2003; City Councillor of São Paulo 1993–97	Vandeval Lima (PL)
25	"Clean Hands"; PFL, PMDB	Romeu Tuma (PFL)	Senator for São Paulo 1995–2010; Director-General of the Federal Police of Brazil 1986–92	Lamartine Posella (PMDB)
26	Party of the Nation's Retirees (PAN)	Osmar Lins (PAN)	No prior office	Ivonete Pasternack (PAN)
27	Christian Social Democratic Party (PSDC)	João Manuel Baptista (PSDC)	No prior office	Edwal Casoni (PSDC)
29	Workers' Cause Party (PCO)	Rui Costa Pimenta (PCO)	No prior office	Cristine Silva (PCO)
30	Workers' General Party (PGT)	Fernando Canindé Pegado (PGT)	No prior office	José Lião (PGT)
36	National Reconstruction Party (PRN)	Ciro Moura (PRN)	No prior office	Singoala Candelo (PRN)
40	"We Are São Paulo"; PSB, PDT, PMN, PPS	Luiza Erundina (PSB)	Federal Deputy from São Paulo since 1999; Secretary of the Federal Administration 1993; Mayor of São Paulo 1989–93; State Deputy of São Paulo 1987–89; City Councillor of São Paulo 1983–86	Emerson Kapaz (PPS)
45	"Respect for São Paulo"; PSDB, PTB, PSD, PRP, PV	Geraldo Alckmin (PSDB)	Vice Governor of São Paulo 1995–2001; Federal Deputy of São Paulo 1987–94; State Deputy of São Paulo 1983–87; Mayor of Pindamonhangaba 1977–82; City Councillor of Pindamonhangaba 1973–77	Campos Machado (PTB)
56	Party of the Reconstruction of the National Order (PRONA)	Enéas Carneiro (PRONA)	No prior office	Paulo Flores Júnior (PRONA)

=== Candidacy denied ===
#	Party/coalition	Mayoral candidate	Political office(s)	Vice-Mayoral candidate	Reason
28	Brazilian Labour Renewal Party (PRTB)	Fernando Collor (PRTB)	President of Brazil 1990–92; Governor of Alagoas 1987–89; Federal Deputy from Alagoas 1983–87; Mayor of Maceió 1979–83	Levy Fidelix (PRTB)	Collor was still banned from running for public offices until 29 December 2000 because of his impeachment. He also didn't declared a permanent residence in São Paulo to the Regional Electoral Court. As a result, his candidacy was impugnated.

== Results ==
=== Mayor ===
Candidate	Running mate	Party	First round		Second round	
Candidate	Running mate	Party	Votes	%	Votes	%
Marta Suplicy	Hélio Bicudo	PT	2,105,013	38.13	3,248,115	58.51
Paulo Maluf	Cunha Bueno	PPB	960,581	17.40	2,303,623	41.49
Geraldo Alckmin	Campos Machado (PTB)	PSDB	952,890	17.26		
Romeu Tuma	Lamartine Posella (PMDB)	PFL	632,658	11.46		
Luiza Erundina	Emerson Capaz (PPS)	PSB	546,766	9.90		
Enéas Carneiro	Paulo Flores Júnior	PRONA	190,844	3.46		
Marcos Cintra	Valdeval Lima	PL	77,827	1.41		
José Masci de Abreu	Maria José Cezar	PTN	21,131	0.38		
José Maria Marin	Elaine Prado	PSC	9,691	0.18		
Francisco Canindé Pegado	José Lião de Almeida	PGT	6,676	0.12		
Fábio Bosco	José Geraldo Corrêa	PSTU	6,394	0.12		
Osmar Lins	Ivonete Pasternack	PAN	5,110	0.09		
João Manuel Baptista	Edwal Casoni	PSDC	2,881	0.05		
Ciro Moura	Singoala Candelo	PRN	1,847	0.03		
Rui Costa Pimenta	Cristine Silva	PCO	870	0.02		
Fernando Collor de Mello	Levy Fidelix	PRTB	0	0.00		
Total			5,521,179	100.00	5,551,738	100.00
Valid votes			5,521,179	90.23	5,551,738	91.71
Invalid votes			348,166	5.69	294,997	4.87
Blank votes			249,970	4.08	206,722	3.41
Total votes			6,119,315	100.00	6,053,457	100.00
Registered voters/turnout			7,134,821	85.77	7,134,821	84.84
PT gain from PTN						

Popular vote (first round)
Suplicy	34.40%
Maluf	17.40%
Alckmin	17.26%
Tuma	11.46%
Erundina	9.90%
Others	5.84%

Popular vote (second round)
Suplicy	58.51%
Maluf	41.49%

=== City Councillors ===
Candidate	Party	Voting	
Candidate	Party	Percentage	Total
José Eduardo Cardozo	PT	4.24%	229,494
Havanir Nimtz	PRONA	1.61%	87,358
Dr. Farhat	PSD	1.18%	63,620
Arselino Tatto	PT	0.84%	45,541
Devanir Ribeiro	PT	0.75%	40,798
Reginaldo Tripoli	PSDB	0.75%	40,629
Carlos Neder	PT	0.74%	39,968
Milton Leite	PMDB	0.73%	39,716
Vicente Cândido	PT	0.71%	38,654
José Mentor	PT	0.68%	36,728
Bishop Atílio	PTB	0.67%	36,159
Dalton Silvano	PSDB	0.66%	35,850
Italo Cardoso	PT	0.65%	34,987
Claudio Fonseca	PCdoB	0.64%	34,614
Gilson Barreto	PSDB	0.63%	33,845
Pastor Vanderlei de Jesus	PL	0.60%	32,432
Marcos Zerbini	PSDB	0.57%	30,748
Adriano Diogo	PT	0.56%	30,221
José Olímpio	PMDB	0.56%	30,095
Carlos Apolinário	PMDB	0.55%	29,523
Estima	PPB	0.54%	29,132
Ricardo Montoro	PSDB	0.53%	28,774
Dr. Calvo	PSB	0.52%	28,032
Goulart	PMDB	0.51%	27,582
Aldaíza Sposati	PT	0.51%	27,497
Celso Cardoso	PPB	0.51%	27,394
João Antônio	PT	0.51%	27,336
William Woo	PSDB	0.50%	27,101
Myryam Athie	PMDB	0.49%	26,543
Carlos Alberto Jr.	PSDB	0.49%	26,480
Gilberto Natalini	PSDB	0.48%	26,210
Toninho Paiva	PFL	0.48%	25,729
Ana Martins	PCdoB	0.47%	25,194
Carlos Giannazi	PT	0.46%	24,992
Beto	PT	0.46%	24,880
Jooji Hato	PMDB	0.45%	24,018
Dissei	PPB	0.44%	23,874
Antonio Erasmo Dias	PPB	0.44%	23,860
Wadih Mutran	PPB	0.42%	22,570
Lucila	PT	0.41%	22,252
Paulo Frange	PTB	0.41%	22,120
Curiati	PPB	0.40%	21,419
Humberto Martins	PDT	0.39%	21,220
Celso Jatene	PTB	0.39%	21,002
Antonio Carlos Rodrigues	PL	0.39%	20,962
Nabil Bonduki	PT	0.38%	20,737
Viviani Ferraz	PL	0.37%	20,114
Laurindo	PT	0.37%	19,783
Augusto Campos	PT	0.35%	18,880
Amazonas	PCdoB	0.34%	18,498
Toninho Força São Paulo	PSB	0.32%	17,284
Raul Cortez	PPS	0.31%	16,645
Eliseu Gabriel	PDT	0.29%	15,520
Dr. Roger Lin	PPS	0.20%	10,679
Baratão	PRONA	0.04%	2,023
