= Esquerdinha (footballer, born 1990) =

Brazilian footballer

Personal information
- Full name: Francisco Lisvaldo Daniel Duarte
- Date of birth: 16 November 1990 (age 35)
- Place of birth: Uiraúna, Brazil
- Height: 1.81 m (5 ft 11 in)
- Position: Left midfielder

Team information
- Current team: Nacional-PB
- Number: 10

Youth career
- 2010–2011: Sousa

Senior career*
Years	Team	Apps	(Gls)
2011–2012	Sousa	10	(2)
2012–2013	Boa Esporte	1	(0)
2013–2014	Treze	10	(2)
2014–2015	Bragantino	18	(1)
2015–2016	Skënderbeu	31	(2)
2016–2017	Marítimo	6	(0)
2017	Madureira	6	(0)
2018	Sousa	10	(2)
2018–2019	Ferroviário	20	(1)
2018	→ Juventude (loan)	5	(0)
2019	→ Alebrijes de Oaxaca (loan)	3	(0)
2020	Guarany	11	(4)
2020	Sousa	4	(1)
2020	Guarany	7	(4)
2021	Icasa	5	(2)
2021	4 de Julho	10	(4)
2021	América-RN	17	(5)
2022	Sousa	27	(3)
2022	Floresta	0	(0)
2023–	Nacional-PB	18	(3)
- * Club domestic league appearances and goals as of 20:17, 20 June 2023 (UTC)

Francisco Lisvaldo Daniel Duarte (born 16 November 1990 in Uiraúna), Brazil, commonly known as Esquerdinha, is a Brazilian professional footballer who plays as a left midfielder for Nacional-PB.

== Career statistics ==
As of 6 August 2015

Club	Season	League			Cup		Europe		Other		Total	
Club	Season	Division	Apps	Goals	Apps	Goals	Apps	Goals	Apps	Goals	Apps	Goals
Sousa EC	2012	Série D	10	2	—		—		—		10	2
Sousa EC	Total		10	2	—		—		—		10	2
Boa Esporte	2012	Série B	1	0	—		—		—		1	0
Boa Esporte	Total		1	0	—		—		—		1	0
Treze	2014	Série C	5	0	4	2	—		4	2	13	4
Treze	Total		5	0	4	2	—		4	2	13	4
Bragantino	2014	Série B	9	0	—		—		—		9	0
Bragantino	2015	Série B	0	0	1	0	—		9	1	10	1
Bragantino	Total		9	0	1	0	—		9	1	19	1
Skënderbeu Korçë	2015–16	Albanian Superliga	0	0	0	0	4	0	0	0	0	0
Skënderbeu Korçë	Total		0	0	0	0	4	0	0	0	0	0
Career total			25	2	5	2	4	0	13	3	47	7
