= Eduardo Suplicy =

Brazilian politician (born 1941)

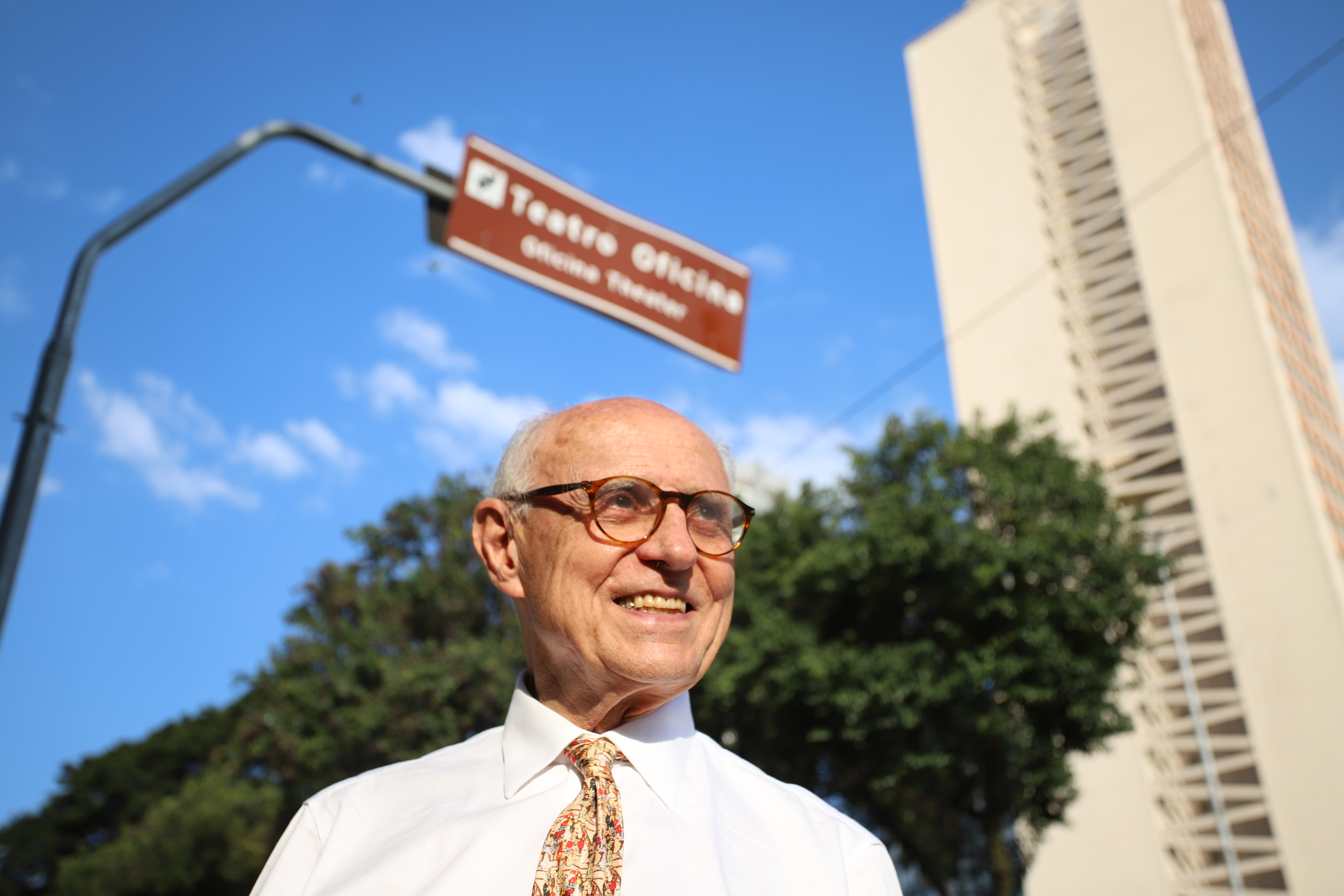
- Suplicy in 2023

State Deputy of São Paulo
- Incumbent
- Assumed office 15 March 2023
- Constituency: At-large
- In office 15 March 1979 – 31 December 1982
- Constituency: At-large

Councillor of São Paulo
- In office 1 January 2017 – 15 March 2023
- Constituency: At-large
- In office 1 January 1989 – 31 March 1990
- Constituency: At-large

First Gentleman of São Paulo
- In office 1 January 2001 – 16 April 2001
- Mayor: Marta Suplicy
- Preceded by: Nicéia Pitta
- Succeeded by: Luis Favre

Senator for São Paulo
- In office 1 February 1991 – 1 February 2015
- Preceded by: Severo Gomes
- Succeeded by: José Serra

Federal Deputy for São Paulo
- In office 1 February 1983 – 31 January 1987
- Constituency: At-large

Personal details
- Born: 21 June 1941 (age 85) São Paulo, Brazil
- Party: PT (1980–present)
- Other political affiliations: MDB (1979–80)
- Spouse: Marta Suplicy (m. 1964; div. 2001)
- Children: Supla; João Suplicy; André Suplicy
- Education: Fundação Getulio Vargas (BBA); Michigan State University (MEc)
- Profession: Economist, professor

Eduardo Matarazzo Suplicy (born 21 June 1941) is a Brazilian politician, economist and professor. He is one of the founders and main political figures of the left-wing Workers Party of Brazil (PT). In the municipal elections of São Paulo in 2016, he was consecrated as the most voted city councilor in the history of Brazil.

Suplicy is primarily known for being an early supporter of universal basic income. Suplicy was a candidate for President of Brazil in the 2002 election, losing the Workers' Party (PT) nomination to Luiz Inácio Lula da Silva. Suplicy was previously married to Marta Suplicy, the former Mayor of São Paulo.

== Biography ==
Son of coffee grower Paulo Cochrane Suplicy and Filomena Matarazzo, he is an heir of the well-known coffee company Suplicy Cafés, besides belonging to the traditional Italian Brazilian Matarazzo family. His mother is a granddaughter of Francesco Matarazzo, known for having created the largest industrial complex in Latin America in the early 20th century.

Suplicy has a degree in business management from the Fundação Getúlio Vargas' School of Business Administration, where he is currently a professor, and a degree in economics from Michigan State University.

On 1964, Suplicy married Marta Teresa Smith de Vasconcelos, better known as Marta Suplicy, and had three sons with her: João, André, and Eduardo. They were one of the most famous couples of Brazilian politics until their divorce in 2001. Currently, Eduardo has a new partner, journalist Monica Dallari.

In 1966, he became professor of the Economics Department of the School of Business Administration of the Fundação Getúlio Vargas in São Paulo, where he still works until today. In 1968, he obtained his master's degree at the Michigan State University. In 1973, Suplicy concluded his PhD at Michigan State University with the thesis "The Effects of Mini devaluation in the Brazilian Economy", published in 1975 by the Fundação Getúlio Vargas. He later did a post-doctorate at Stanford University.

Eduardo Suplicy is the author of "The Effect of Mini devaluations in the Brazilian Economy" (Published by Fundação Getúlio Vargas - 1975); "International and Brazilian Economic Policies" (Published by Vozes ed. - 1977); "Commitment" (Published by Editora Brasiliense - 1978); "Investigating the Coroa-Brastel Case" (edited by the House of Representatives - 1985); "From the Distribution of Income to the Rights of Citizenship" (published by Editora Brasiliense - 1988) and "The Program of Guaranteed Minimum Income" (edited by the Federal Senate - 1992).

On the second of February 2016, he is made doctor honoris causa from the University of Louvain (UCLouvain).

== Political career ==
Suplicy managed to be first elected senator in the history of the Brazilian Labour Party (PT). His political performance is the result of a public life constructed throughout almost 20 years, when he was elected for his first mandate as State Deputy (1979/1983). He is one of the founders of Workers Party of Brazil (PT) and member of the Executive and the National Directory of the Party.

Elected Senator of the Republic for the mandate 1991/99, with 4,229,706 votes, Eduardo Suplicy occupied the position of leader of PT in the Federal Senate for three times. Since 1991, Suplicy acts as a Senator for the state of São Paulo. That year, he became the first member of the Workers' Party to take office as Senator. In the 1998 elections for the Federal Senate, Eduardo Suplicy conquered the biggest poll for this position in the Country and the second greatest of the history of São Paulo, with 6,718,463 votes.

On July 25, 2016, Suplicy was detained for three hours in the 75th Police District by the São Paulo Military Police for civil disobedience for lying in the street during a protest against a repossession in the West Zone of São Paulo.

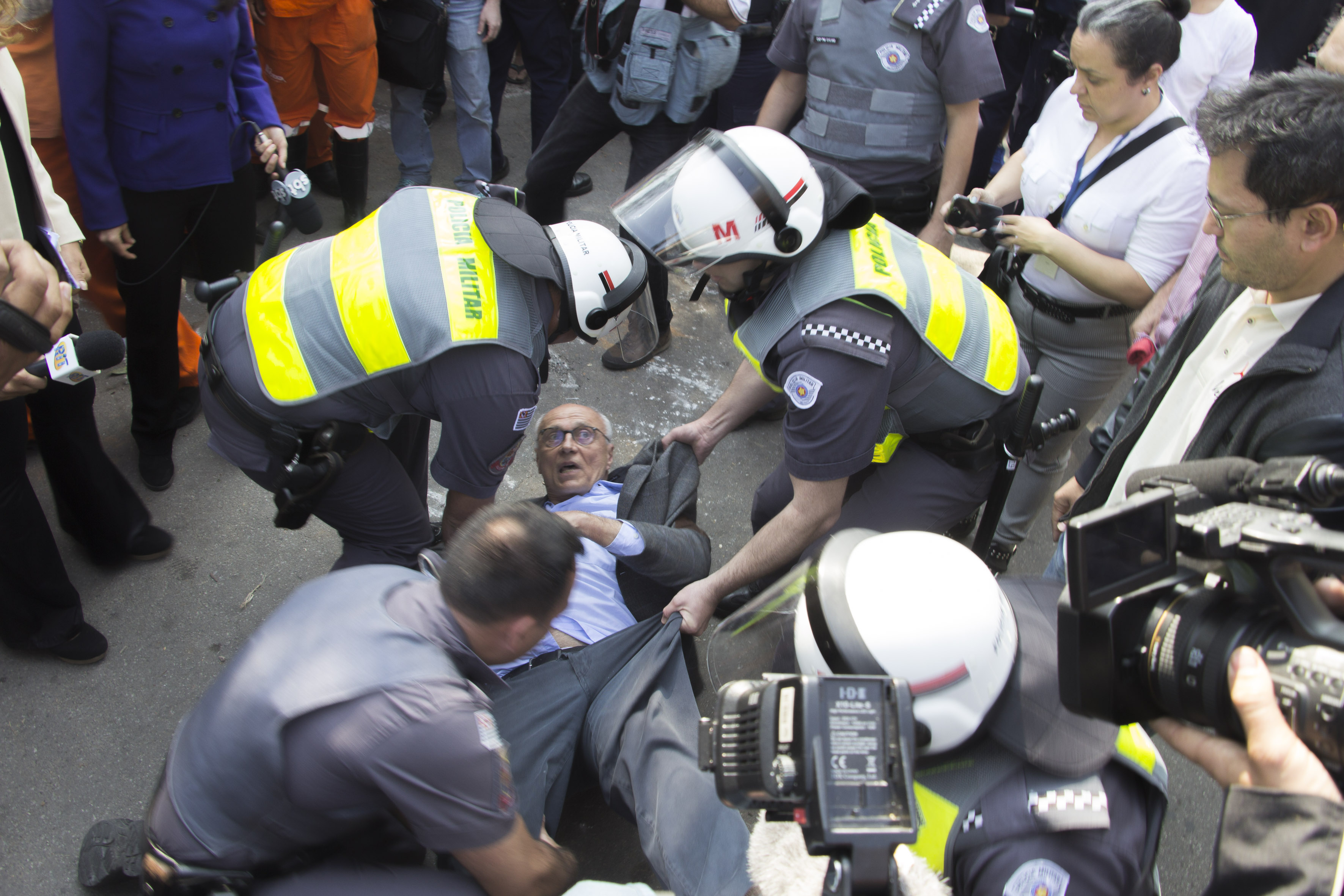
Suplicy is detained during repossession in Cidade Educandário, near Raposo Tavares, on July 25, 2016, after a demonstration by residents against the action of the Military Police.

== Political agenda ==
One of the most important Bill of Law presented by Suplicy institutes in Brazil the Program of Guaranteed Basic Income. Approved in the Senate in December 1991, it waited for seven years to be voted in the Commission of Finances and Taxation of the House of Representatives.

Suplicy also presented Bills of Law requiring the knowledgement of the main debtors to the Federal Budget, to the Labour Ministry, to the Social Security and Federal Government Saving Bank; creating the structure of the National Co-operative Society System; granting amnesty to the labor union representatives due to political motivations; instituting direct elections for substitutes of candidates to the Federal Senate and authorizing the Executive Power to create the Brazilian Citizenship Fund, among others. To fulfill his campaign promises, Suplicy tried to present a proposition to reduce the senators’ mandate for four years.

== Electoral history ==
Election	Party	Office	Coalition	Running mate	First Round		Second Round		Result
Election	Party	Office	Coalition	Running mate	Votes	%	Votes	%	Result
1978 São Paulo State Election	Brazilian Democratic Movement (MDB)	State deputy	—N/a	—N/a	70,377	(#4)	—N/a	—N/a	Elected
1982 São Paulo State Election	Worker's Party (PT)	Federal deputy	—N/a	—N/a	83,189	0.72 (#27)	—N/a	—N/a	Elected
1985 São Paulo Mayoral Election	Worker's Party (PT)	Mayor	—N/a	Luiza Erundina (PT)	827,452	20.70 (#3)	—N/a	—N/a	Lost
1986 São Paulo State Election	Worker's Party (PT)	Governor	—N/a	Paulo Otavio de Azevedo Júnior (PT)	1,508,589	11.03 (#4)	—N/a	—N/a	Lost
1988 São Paulo Mayoral Election	Worker's Party (PT)	City councilor	People's Parties (PT, PCdoB, PC)	—N/a	201,549	3.92 (#1)	—N/a	—N/a	Elected
1990 São Paulo State Election	Worker's Party (PT)	Senator	Popular Democratic Union (PT, PSB, PCB, PCdoB))	—N/a	4,229,867	35.46 (#1)	—N/a	—N/a	Elected
1992 São Paulo Mayoral Election	Worker's Party (PT)	Mayor	People's Parties (PT, PSB, PCdoB, PC)	Gumercindo Milhomem (PT)	1,279,231	30.68 (#2)	2,024,957	41.92 (#2)	Lost
1998 São Paulo State Election	Worker's Party (PT)	Senator	To Renew São Paulo (PT, PCdoB, PCB, PPS, PMN)	—N/a	6,718,463	43.13 (#1)	—N/a	—N/a	Elected
2006 São Paulo State Election	Worker's Party (PT)	Senator	Better for São Paulo (PT, PCdoB, PL, PRB)	—N/a	8,986,803	47.82 (1#)	—N/a	—N/a	Elected
2014 São Paulo State Election	Worker's Party (PT)	Senator	To Really Change (PT, PCdoB, PR, PPL)	—N/a	6,176,499	32.21 (#2)	—N/a	—N/a	Lost
2016 São Paulo Mayoral Election	Worker's Party (PT)	City councilor	More São Paulo (PT, PCdoB, PDT e PROS)	—N/a	301,446	5.62 (1#)	—N/a	—N/a	Elected
2018 São Paulo State Election	Worker's Party (PT)	Senator	São Paulo of Work and Opportunities (PT, PCdoB)	—N/a	4,667,565	13.32 (#3)	—N/a	—N/a	Lost
2020 São Paulo Mayoral Election	Worker's Party (PT)	City councilor	—N/a	—N/a	167,552	3.28 (1#)	—N/a	—N/a	Elected
2022 São Paulo State Election	Worker's Party (PT)	State deputy	Together for São Paulo (PT, PCdoB, PV, PSOL, Rede, PSB, Agir)	—N/a	807,015	3.46 (1#)	—N/a	—N/a	Elected

== See also ==
- Universal basic income in Brazil

== Citations ==
Honorary titles
Preceded by Nicéia Pitta	First Gentleman of São Paulo; 2001	Succeeded by Luis Favre
