= Nabil Bonduki =

Brazilian architect and urban planner

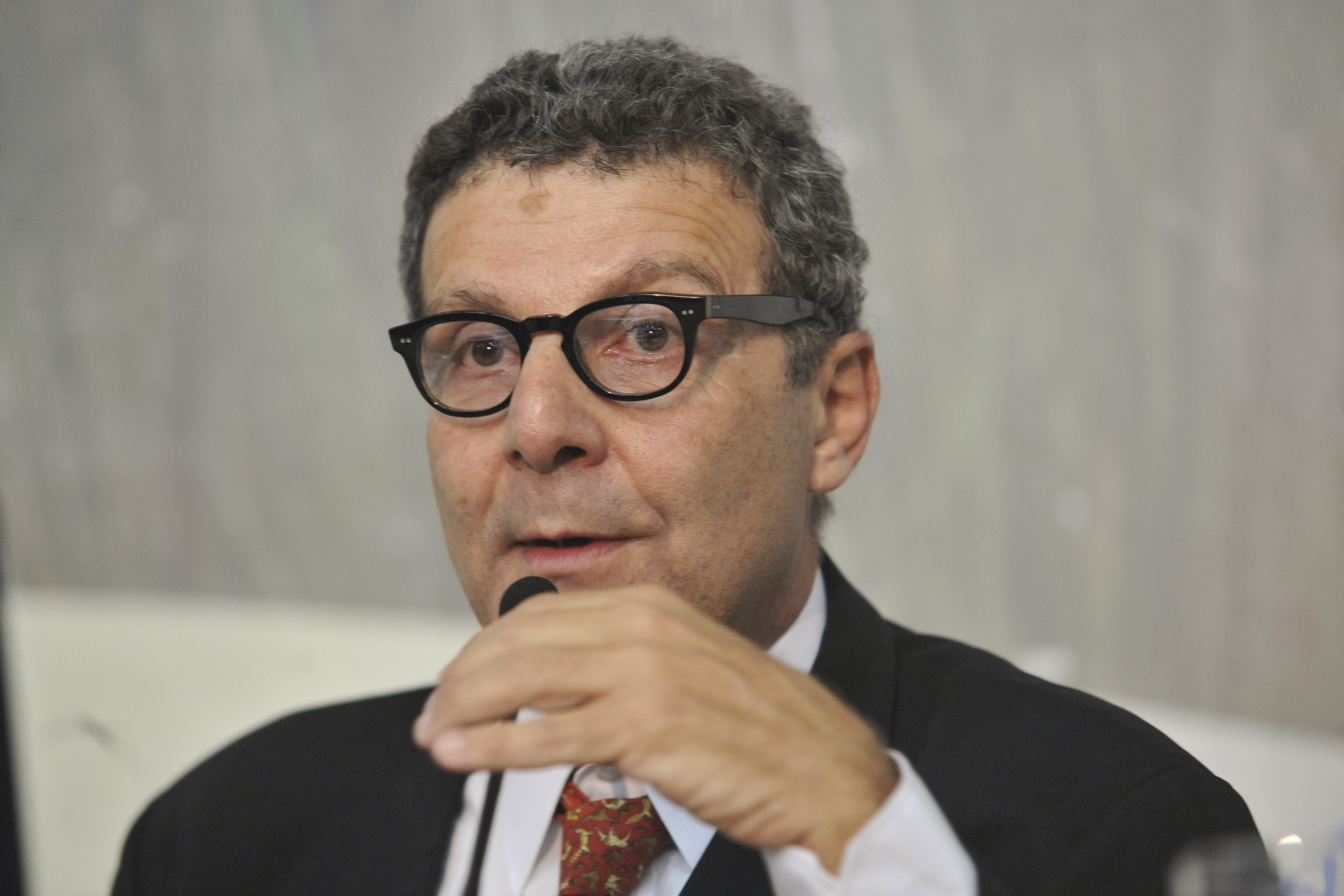
- Bonduki in 2011

Councillor of São Paulo
- Incumbent
- Assumed office 1 January 2025
- Constituency: At-large
- In office 1 January 2013 – 1 January 2017
- Constituency: At-large
- In office 1 January 2001 – 1 January 2005
- Constituency: At-large

Municipal Secretary of Culture of São Paulo
- In office 3 February 2015 – 4 April 2016
- Mayor: Fernando Haddad
- Preceded by: Juca Ferreira
- Succeeded by: Maria do Rosário Ramalho

Personal details
- Born: Nabil Georges Bonduki; 4 February 1955 (age 71) São Paulo, Brazil
- Party: PT (since 1986)
- Education: Faculty of Architecture and Urbanism, University of São Paulo
- Awards: Jabuti Award (2015)

Nabil Georges Bonduki (4 February 1955) is a Brazilian architect, urban planner, university professor, author, and politician. He holds the position of Full Professor of Urban Planning at the University of São Paulo (USP) and serves as a visiting professor at the University of California, Berkeley.

He served as a councilor in the Municipal Chamber of São Paulo from 2001 to 2004 and from 2013 to 2016 as a member of the Workers' Party (PT), playing a crucial role in crafting the Strategic Master Plan of São Paulo in 2002 and 2014. He also served as the Municipal Secretary of Culture in São Paulo and has contributed as a columnist to media outlets such as CartaCapital since 2010, Folha de S.Paulo since 2017, and Radio USP since 2019.

== Biography ==
=== Early years ===
Nabil was born in the city of São Paulo in the year 1955 and is a descendant of Syrian immigrants who originated from the city of Homs.

=== Academic formation ===
Bonduki's academic career began at the School of Architecture and Urbanism (FAU) at the University of São Paulo (USP), where he enrolled in the Architecture program and successfully graduated in the year 1978. In the year 1987, he completed his master's degree at the same university with a dissertation titled "Housing & Self-Management: Constructing Territories of Utopia," under the guidance of sociologist Gabriel Bolaffi.

In the year 1995, he attained his doctoral degree, also from FAU, with a thesis titled "Origins of Social Housing in Brazil: Modern Architecture, Tenancy Laws, and the Diffusion of Homeownership" (1998). In this work, Bonduki presents a historical overview of the housing development in the country and its gradual expansion up to the Brazilian military dictatorship era.

Bonduki initiated his teaching career in the year 1975, imparting lessons at Colégio Objetivo, and became a professor at USP in 1986. Since 2003, he has served as a faculty member in the Department of Design at the School of Architecture and Urbanism at the University of São Paulo. In 2013, he participated in a selection process and was granted the position of Full Professor of Urban Planning at the same institution. In 2011, he successfully obtained his Livre-Docência qualification in the field of urban planning. In the year 2018, he held a position as a visiting professor at the University of California, Berkeley.

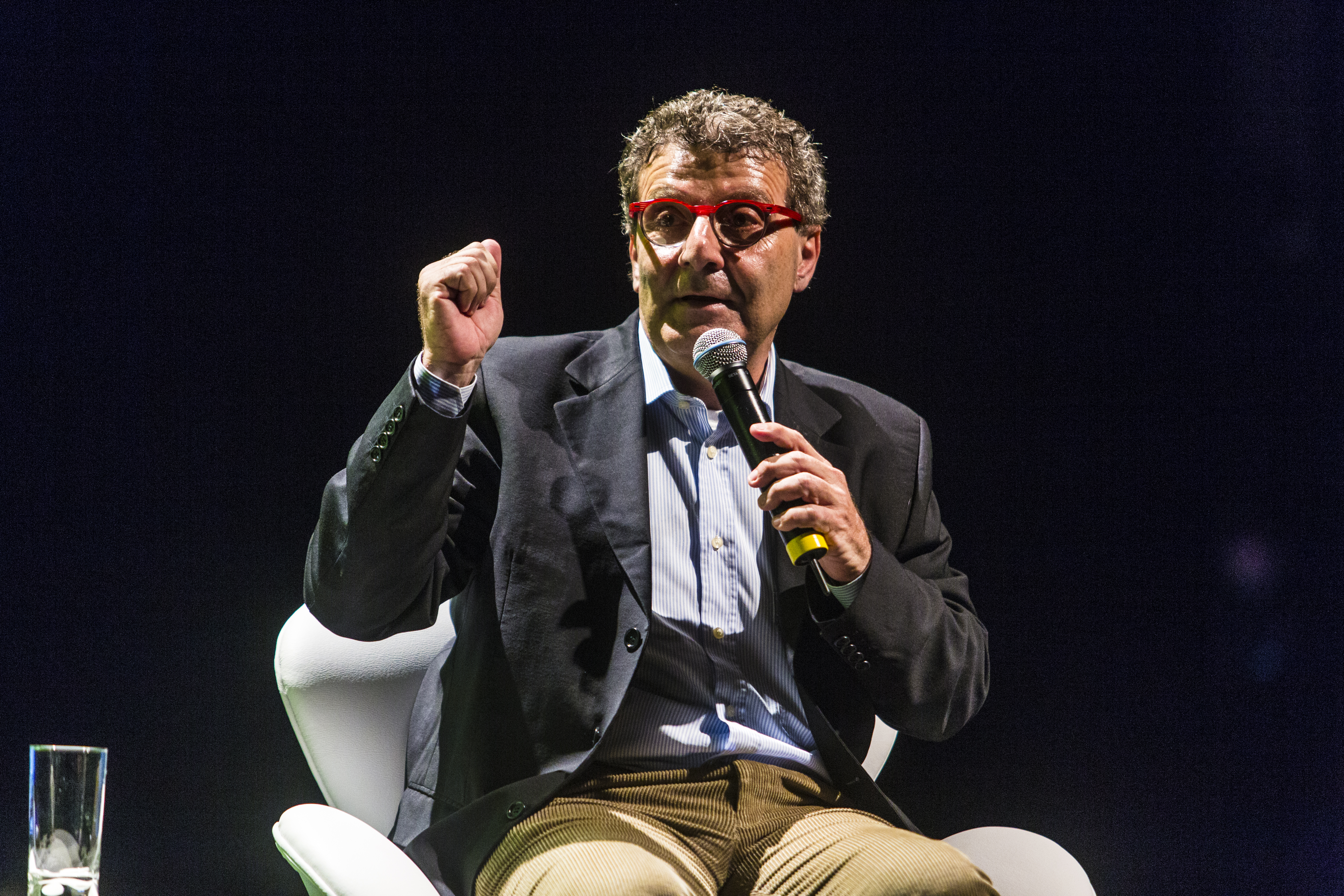
Nabil Bonkudi during the Virada Sustentável event of 2015.

=== Production ===
As a researcher in urbanism and architectural history, Bonduki has authored twelve books. Notably, his work "Pioneiros da Habitação Social" ("Pioneers of Social Housing", Co-published by Editora Unesp and SESC) garnered significant recognition. In 2015, this book was awarded the Jabuti Prize for Literature in the category of "Architecture, Urbanism, Arts, and Photography." He is the author of hundreds of academic articles, as well as contributions to specialized and general press outlets. Since 2010, he has been a columnist for CartaCapital magazine.

Since the year 2017, he has also been a columnist for Folha de S. Paulo newspaper. Starting from 2019, he has been the author of the "Cotidiano na Metrópole" column on Radio USP.

== Politics ==
Nabil held the position of Superintendent of Popular Housing for the city of São Paulo during the administration of Luiza Erundina (PT) from 1989 to 1992. In this role, he oversaw the implementation of the Municipality's Social Housing Program.

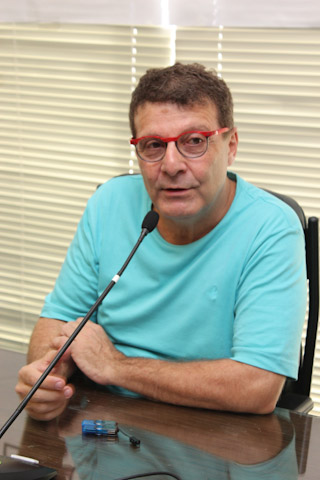
Nabil Bonduki during a lecture.

In the year 2000, he was elected as a City Councilor of São Paulo (2001–2004) with 20,737 votes. During his tenure, he spearheaded the formulation of the revised version of the Strategic Master Plan for the City of São Paulo, as well as the Regional Plans for the city's 31 sub-municipalities. He provided consultancy services for numerous municipalities in the development of master plans and housing strategies. Some of the places he offered his expertise include Franca, Ipatinga, Taboão da Serra, Nova Iguaçu, São Paulo, Salvador, and the Federal District.

He played a pivotal role in coordinating the consultancy for the creation of the National Housing Plan (2007/8). He served as a consultant for the formulation of the National Housing Policy of Mozambique (2009) and the National Housing Plan of Cape Verde (2010). In 2011 and 2012, he held the position of National Secretary for Water Resources and Urban Environment at the Brazilian Ministry of the Environment, where he oversaw the implementation of the National Solid Waste Law and was responsible for organizing the urban sustainability agenda within the ministry.

In the year 2012, he was once again elected as a City Councilor of São Paulo, representing the Workers' Party (PT), with a total of 42,411 votes. Also in 2012, he served as the coordinator of the urban development program for the then mayoral candidate of São Paulo, Fernando Haddad. During his tenure as a City Councilor of São Paulo (2013–2016), he held the role of rapporteur and author of the Revised Strategic Master Plan of São Paulo (2014). This achievement earned him recognition from the United Nations (UN).

He crafted numerous bills in various domains such as urbanism, culture, environment, mobility, housing, and human rights. Many of his authored laws are currently in effect within the city, including the legislation that gave rise to VAI 1 and VAI 2 (Cultural Initiatives Valorization Program), aimed at supporting cultural projects by youth in the city's peripheries, as well as the Dance Promotion law; the Participatory Management of Public Squares; the requirement to register housing promoted by the municipality in the name of women; the Open Streets Program; the mandate for organic products to be included in school meals; and the exemption of Property Tax (IPTU) for theaters and cinemas located in buildings adjacent to streets, among others.

In the early months of 2015, he was appointed by Mayor Fernando Haddad as the Municipal Secretary of Culture of São Paulo, succeeding Juca Ferreira, who had taken up the role of Minister of Culture. During his tenure at the Culture Department, he introduced several initiatives, including the establishment of SPCine, a city-owned entity dedicated to the audiovisual sector, the Street Carnival, the Municipal Cultural Circuit, and the enhancement of the network of cultural centers under the department's purview. He left his position and was succeeded by Maria do Rosário Ramalho.

In April 2016, he resumed his role as a City Councilor and ran for re-election in the legislative elections held in October of the same year. However, he was not successful in securing a seat, garnering over 23,269 votes and ending up as the first alternate.

== Awards ==
He was awarded the Architect of the Year prize by the National Federation of Architects in the Public category in 2009.

He won the Jabuti Award, the most prestigious literary award in Brazil, in 2015 with his book "Pioneiros da Habitação Social" in the category of "Architecture, Urbanism, Arts, and Photography."

== Published works ==
- Periferias: ocupação do espaço e reprodução da força de trabalho. São Paulo: Cadernos de Estudos e Pesquisa Prodeur - FAU-USP, 1978, 130 p. (coauthored with Raquel Rolnik).
- Habitação & Autogestão: construindo territórios de utopia. Rio de Janeiro: Fase, 1992, 181 p.
- Arquitetura & Habitação Social em São Paulo 1989-1992. Catalogue for the exposition at the II Bienal Internacional de Arquitetura de São Paulo. São Paulo: Escola de Engenharia de São Carlos da Universidade de São Paulo, 1993. 96 p.
- Habitat: As práticas bem sucedidas em habitação, meio ambiente e gestão urbana nas cidades brasileiras. São Paulo: Studio Nobel, 1996, 256 p. (2nd ed. 1999).
- Origens da Habitação Social no Brasil. São Paulo: Estação Liberdade, 1998, 344 p. (2ª ed., 1999, 3ª ed., 2001, 4ª ed., 2004, 5ª ed. 2007; 6ª ed. 2012, 7ª ed. 2016).(Premio Melhor Livro ANPUR 1999).
- Affonso Eduardo Reidy. Lisboa: Blau/Instituto Lina Bo and P.M. Bardi, 1999, 216 p. Port./Inglês. 2000.
- Habitar São Paulo – Reflexões sobre a gestão urbana. 1ª edição, São Paulo: Estação Liberdade, 2000, 168 p. ISBN 85-7448-032-0.
- Plano Municipal de Habitação de Salvador, 2008–2025. Salvador: Prefeitura Municipal de Salvador, 2008. (coauthored with Rossella Rossetto).
- Procedimentos inovadores em gestão habitacional, 1st edition, Porto Alegre: ANTAC, v.1, 2009, 216 p.(coorganized with Adauto Cardoso).
- Expansão urbana em questão: instrumentos para ordenar o crescimento das cidades. São Paulo, Instituto Polis, 2010. (coauthored with Paula Santoro)
- Intervenções urbanas em núcleos históricos. Brasília: Iphan, 2012.
- Pioneiros da Habitação Social (Volume 1) – Cem anos de políticas públicas no Brasil. São Paulo: Editora da Unesp e Editora Sesc, 2014, 387p.(Jabuti Prize of 2015).
- Pioneiros da Habitação Social (Volume 2) – Inventário da produção habitacional (1930-1964). São Paulo: Editora da Unesp e Editora Sesc, 2014, 499 p..(coauthored with Ana Paula Koury).
- Pioneiros da Habitação Social (Volume 3) – Onze modos de morar no Brasil moderno . São Paulo: Editora da Unesp and Editora Sesc, 2014, 287p.
- A luta pela Reforma Urbana no Brasil. São Paulo: Casa da Cidade Edições, 2018.
