= Tiago Dimas =

Brazilian politician (born 1988)

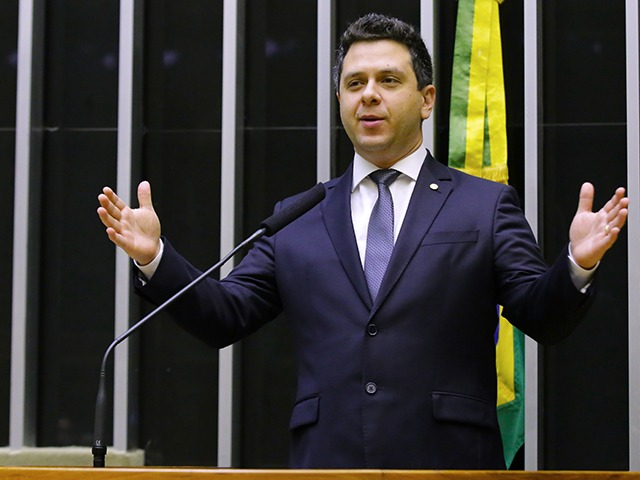
- Dimas in 2021

Member of the Chamber of Deputies
- Incumbent
- Assumed office 31 July 2025
- Preceded by: Lázaro Botelho
- Constituency: Tocantins
- In office 1 February 2019 – 31 January 2023
- Constituency: Tocantins

Personal details
- Born: 4 August 1988 (age 37)
- Party: Podemos (since 2022)
- Parent: Ronaldo Dimas (father)

Tiago Braga Pereira (born 4 August 1988), better known as Tiago Dimas, is a Brazilian politician. He has been a member of the Chamber of Deputies since 2025, having previously served from 2019 to 2023. He is the son of Ronaldo Dimas.
