= Sargento Portugal =

Brazilian politician (born 1976)

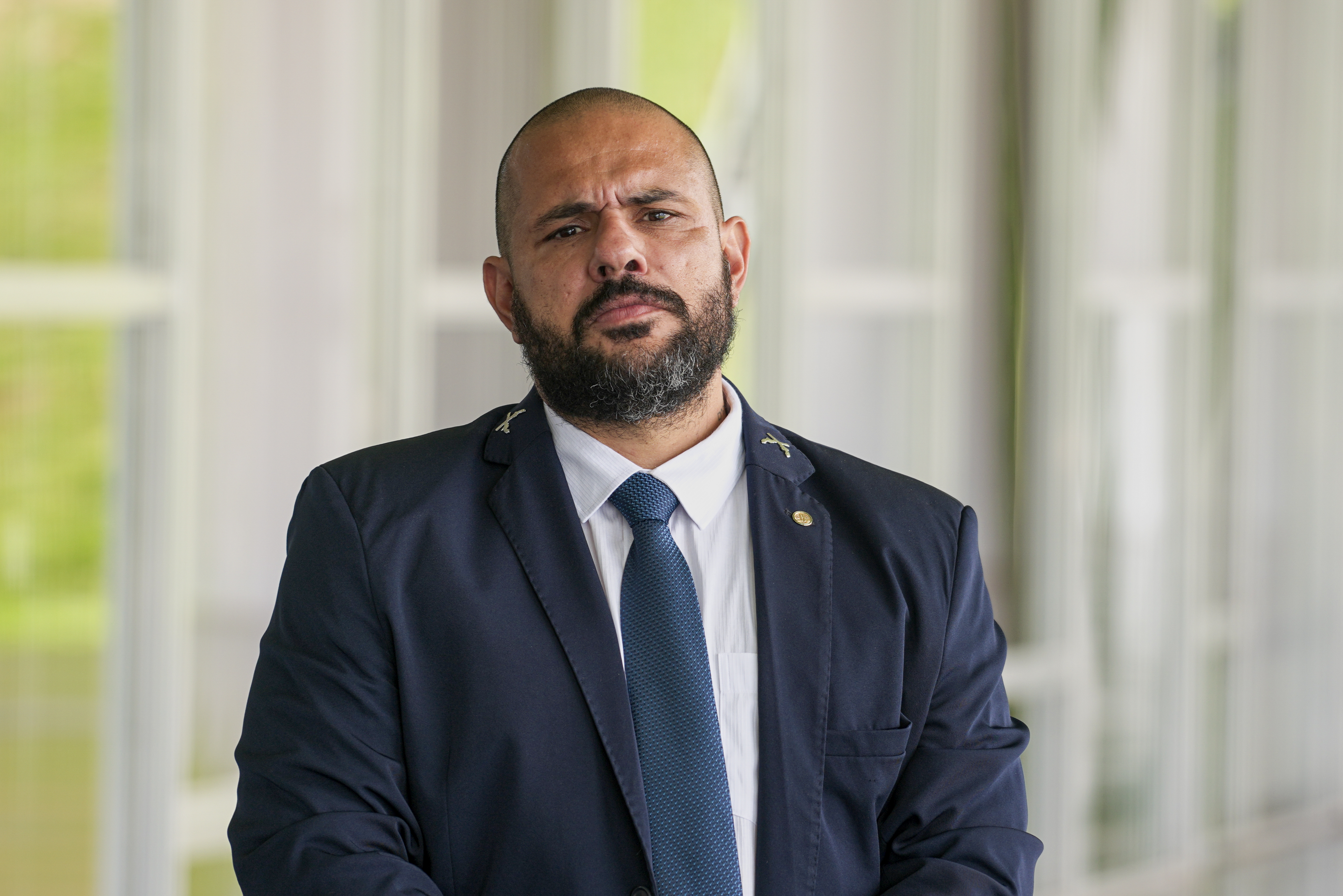
- Portugal in 2023

Member of the Chamber of Deputies
- Incumbent
- Assumed office 1 February 2023
- Constituency: Rio de Janeiro

Personal details
- Born: 26 August 1976 (age 49)
- Party: Podemos (since 2022)

José Portugal Neto (born 26 August 1976), better known as Sargento Portugal, is a Brazilian politician serving as a member of the Chamber of Deputies since 2023. From 2000 to 2022, he was a sergeant of the Military Police of Rio de Janeiro State.
