= Inês Bonduki =

Brazilian photographer (born 1984)

- Born: 1984
- Education: Faculty of Architecture and Urbanism of the University of São Paulo, Escola de Comunicações e Artes da Universidade de São Paulo
- Known for: Photography
- Awards: Conrad Wessel Award, Foto em Pauta, Prêmio Militão de Augusto Azevedo
- Website: https://www.inesbonduki.com/

Inês Bonduki (born 1984) is a Brazilian documentarist and essayist photographer based in São Paulo. She has won the Conrad Wessel Award in 2015 and Foto in Pauta Award in 2016 for the "Linha Vermelha" photographic essay which depicts the human flux at São Paulo's Line 3 (São Paulo Metro) as well as the Militão de Augusto Azevedo Prize in 2022 for the "Origem-Destino" project, a collaborative project which depicts the commuting journey of 60+ women in São Paulo as informed by statistical surveys.

== Publications ==
- 2023: Origem-Destino, exhibition catalog
- 2022: Mancha Urbana
- 2020: De noite penso no dia, de dia penso na noite
- 2017: Linha Vermelha
- 2010: São Paulo Corpo-a-Corpo

== Exhibitions ==
- 2023: "Sobre Prata, Tinta e Papel, Espaço as Artes (EdA), São Paulo
- 2022: "Mais de Um é Multidão", Oficina Cultural Oswald de Andrade, São Paulo
- 2021: "Novas aquisições do Instituto PIPA" - Paço Imperial, Rio de Janeiro
- 2020: "Foto-Texto" - Casa Contemporânea, São Paulo
- 2019: "De noite penso no dia, de dia penso na noite", with Yukie Hori Brazil´s Embassy in Tokyo, Japan (solo)
- 2019: "Paisagem e Arte" - FAU-USP, São Paulo
- 2018: "Bienal de Fotografia de Tucuman", Museu Nacional de Tucuman (MUNT), Argentina
- 2016: "Pós Poéticas" - Espaço das Artes (EdA), Cidade Universitária, São Paulo
- 2016: "Internacional Festival of Contact Improvisation of São Paulo", São Paulo
- 2015: “Linha Vermelha”. Visual Studies Workshop - Rochester, New York (solo)
- 2015: “Expanded Cinema at Visual Studies Workshop”, Rochester, New York

== Awards and Grants ==
- 2022: Militão de Augusto Azevedo Prize, Museu da Cidade de São Paulo
- 2022: Imaginária Festival Prize (finalist)
- 2017-22: Visual Art´s PhD Grant - CAPES
- 2017: Gabrielle Basílico Prize (finalist)
- 2016: Foto em Pauta Festival Prize
- 2016: ZUM Magazine - Best Photography Books of 2016
- 2015: Conrado Wessel Prize
- 2015: International Research Grant - FAPESP
- 2013-2015: Visual Art´s Master Degree Grant - FAPESP

== Collections ==
- PIPA Institute Rio de Janeiro - De noite penso no dia, de dia penso na noite
- Arquivo Municipal de Lisboa, (Portugal), Linha Vermelha
- Museu Nacional de Tucumán (Argentina), Linha Vermelha
- Instituto Moreira Salles Library (IMS), São Paulo, Linha Vermelha
- Visual Studies Workshop Library (Rochester, NY, USA), Linha Vermelha
- Thomas J. Watson Library (Metropolitan Museum of Art - NY, USA)), Linha Vermelha
- International Center of Photography Library (ICP - NY), Linha Vermelha
- New York Public Library (NY, USA), Linha Vermelha
- University of Rochester (NY, USA), Linha Vermelha
- School of the Art Institut of Chicago (SAIC), Linha Vermelha
- Wallacy Library (RIT, EUA), Linha Vermelha
- Yale University Library (NH, USA), Linha Vermelha
- University of North Caroline at Chapel Hill Library (USA), Linha Vermelha
- Acervo Coleção de Livros de Artista da UFMG, Belo Horizonte, Linha Vermelha
- Biblioteca UFPA, Belém, Linha Vermelha
- Biblioteca UFRGS, Porto Alegre, Linha Vermelha
- Biblioteca ECA-USP, São Paulo, Linha Vermelha
