= Luiza Erundina =

Brazilian politician (born 1934)

- Erundina in 2022

Federal Deputy from São Paulo
- Incumbent
- Assumed office 1 February 1999

Secretary of the Federal Administration
- In office 28 February 1993 – 20 May 1993
- President: Itamar Franco
- Preceded by: Osiris de Azevedo Lopes Filho
- Succeeded by: Romildo Canhim

Mayor of São Paulo
- In office 1 January 1989 – 1 January 1993
- Vice Mayor: Luiz Eduardo Greenhalgh
- Preceded by: Jânio Quadros
- Succeeded by: Paulo Maluf

State Deputy of São Paulo
- In office 15 March 1987 – 1 January 1989

City Councillor of São Paulo
- In office 15 March 1983 – 15 March 1986

Personal details
- Born: Luiza Erundina de Sousa; 30 November 1934 (age 91) Uiraúna, Paraíba, Brazil
- Party: PSOL (since 2016)
- Other political affiliations: PT (1980–1998); PSB (1998–2016)
- Education: Federal University of Paraíba
- Profession: Social worker

Luiza Erundina de Sousa (Brazilian Portuguese pronunciation: [luˈizɐ eɾũˈdʒinɐ dʒi ˈsowzɐ]; November 30, 1934) is a Brazilian politician, born in Uiraúna, a small city in the interior of the Brazilian state of Paraíba.

== Biography ==
Luiza Erundina was raised a Catholic in a poor family in Paraíba. She was a social worker before entering politics as a member of the PT in 1980. Erundina pursued a Bachelor's degree in Social Service from Federal University of Paraíba. She also holds a Master's degree in Sociology from University of São Paulo. She served on the São Paulo city council from 1983 to 1987. From 1987 to 1988, she was a state deputy for the state of São Paulo. Erundina was chosen as the PT's mayoral candidate through an internal party election, although her more middle-class rival Plínio de Arruda Sampaio enjoyed greater support from the party leadership.

She succeeded in becoming the city's first female mayor after defeating the far-right Paulo Maluf in the 1988 municipal elections. In office from 1989 to 1992, her mayoral administration increased social spending by almost ten percentage points compared to the preceding fifteen years, which was funded by property taxes and improved tax collection. According to analyst Andre Pagliarini, "Erundina's tenure helped solidify the PT's reputation as a party capable of implementing progressive policies and managing complex urban issues". However, business groups attempted to fight her administration's property tax in court. While these groups lost their court case, they managed to stall the tax reform until after the PT left power. Additionally, Erundina's administration went through a crisis in 1992 when it decided to lay off striking bus drivers and conductors. Lula criticized her (alongside other PT mayors) for her handling of the crisis. Erundina achieved some successes in increasing participative decision making, although this policy also "got bogged down" in internal disputes and faced strong opposition from other political parties; it was dismantled by her successors. She was re-elected in 2002, 2006, 2010, 2014 and 2018.

From 1980 to 1997, Erundina was affiliated with the PT. However, she came into conflict with the party leadership on a number of occasions, often tied to her attempts to gain more autonomy from the central leadership. In 1989, Lula even said that Erundina "gives me a pain in the ass". These tensions came to a head in 1994 when she decided to join the Itamar Franco administration, contrary to the party line of the PT; subsequently, the party considered expelling her. In 1997, she changed to the PSB party. Due to disagreements within PSB that decided to support the impeachment process against president Dilma Rousseff, Erundina switched to the PSOL in March 2016.

In the 2020 São Paulo mayoral election, Erundina ran as the vice mayoral candidate of Guilherme Boulos, also of PSOL.

Political offices
Preceded by Jânio Quadros	Mayor of São Paulo; 1989–1992	Succeeded by Paulo Maluf
Preceded by Osiris de Azevedo Lopes Filho	Secretary of the Federal Administration; 1993	Succeeded by Romildo Canhim
Party political offices
Preceded by Eduardo Suplicy	PT nominee for Mayor of São Paulo; 1988, 1996	Succeeded by Eduardo Suplicy
Preceded by Eduardo Suplicy	PT nominee for Mayor of São Paulo; 1988, 1996	Succeeded by Marta Suplicy
New political party	PSB nominee for Mayor of São Paulo; 2000, 2004	Succeeded by Márcio França
Preceded by Carlos Giannazi	PSOL nominee for Mayor of São Paulo; 2016	Succeeded by Guilherme Boulos
Preceded by Ivan Valente	PSOL nominee for Vice Mayor of São Paulo; 2020	Most recent
