= List of senators of São Paulo =

The federal senators of São Paulo are the representatives of the state of São Paulo in the Federal Senate of Brazil. São Paulo is represented by three senators in the upper house of the National Congress of Brazil.

== Federal senators ==
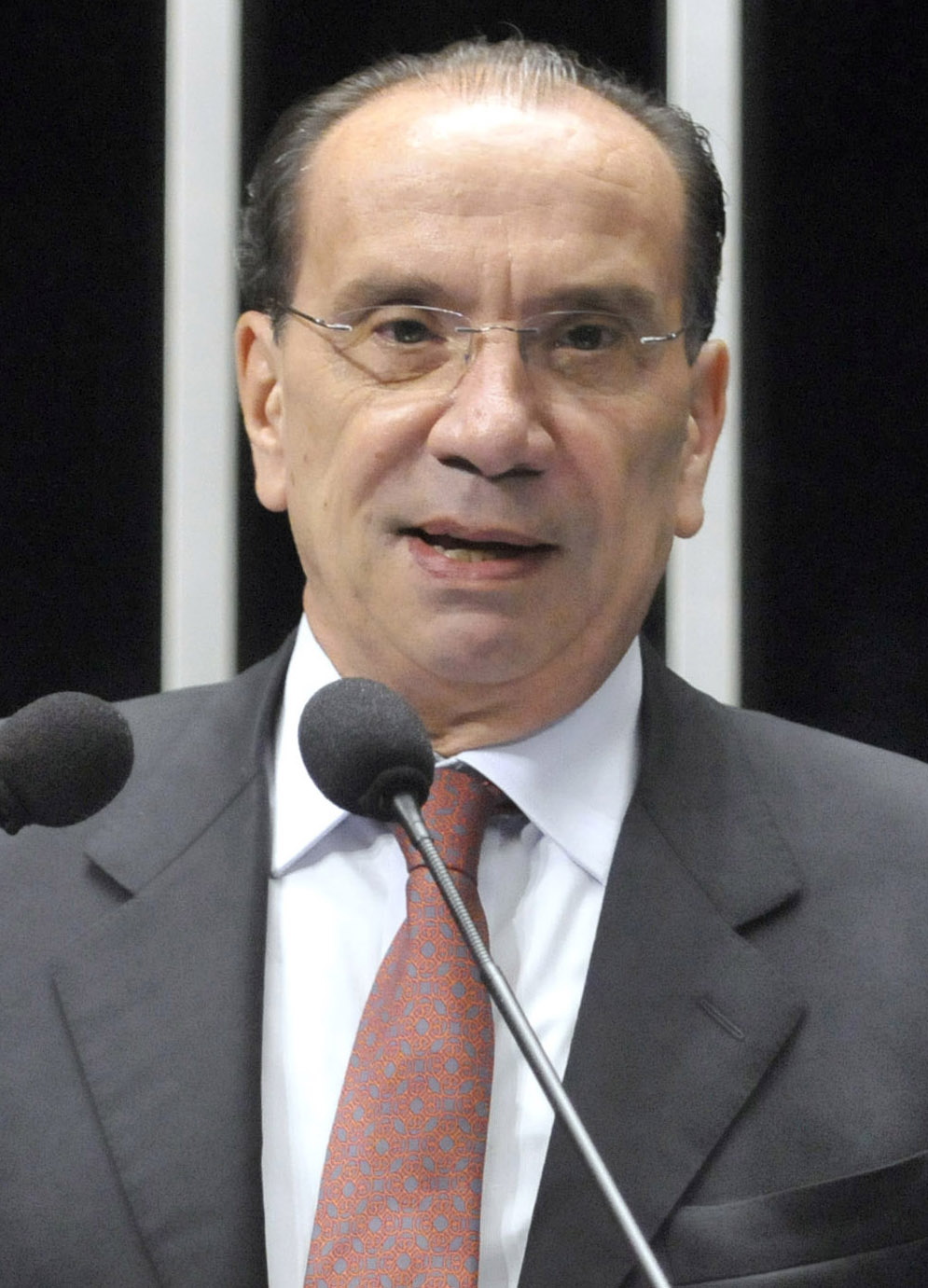
Aloysio Nunes.

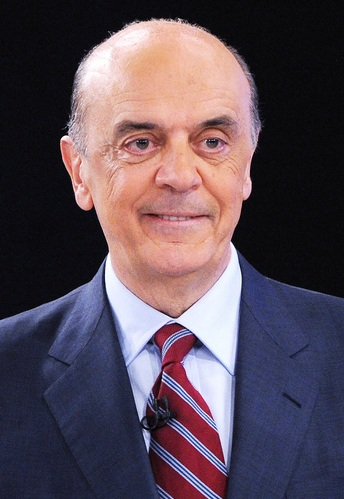
José Serra.

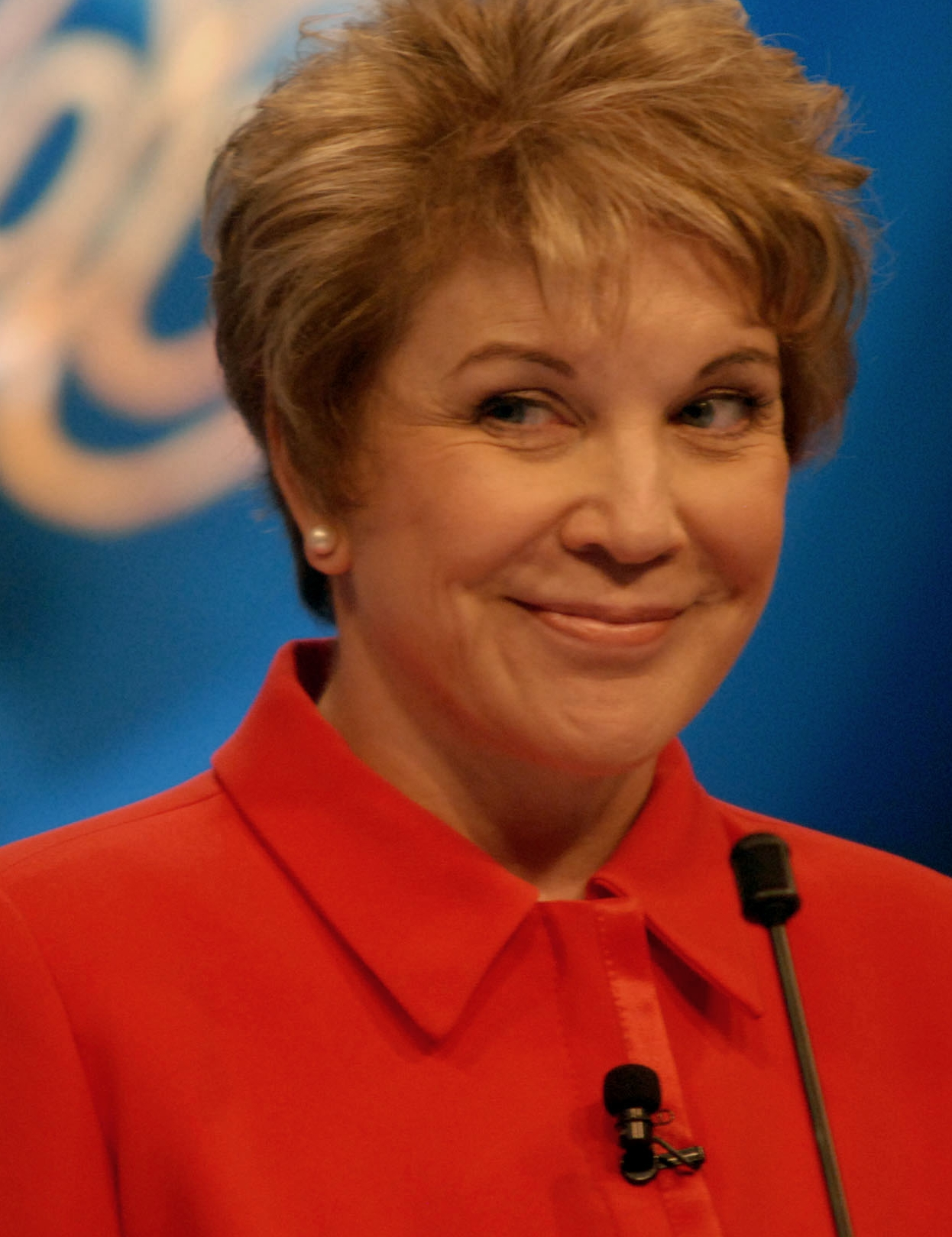
Marta Suplicy.

- Aloysio Nunes - PSDB (Brazilian Social Democracy Party)
- José Serra - PSDB (Brazilian Social Democracy Party)
- Marta Suplicy - PMDB (Brazilian Democratic Movement Party)
