= José de Abreu (politician) =

Brazilian businessman and politician (1944–2022)

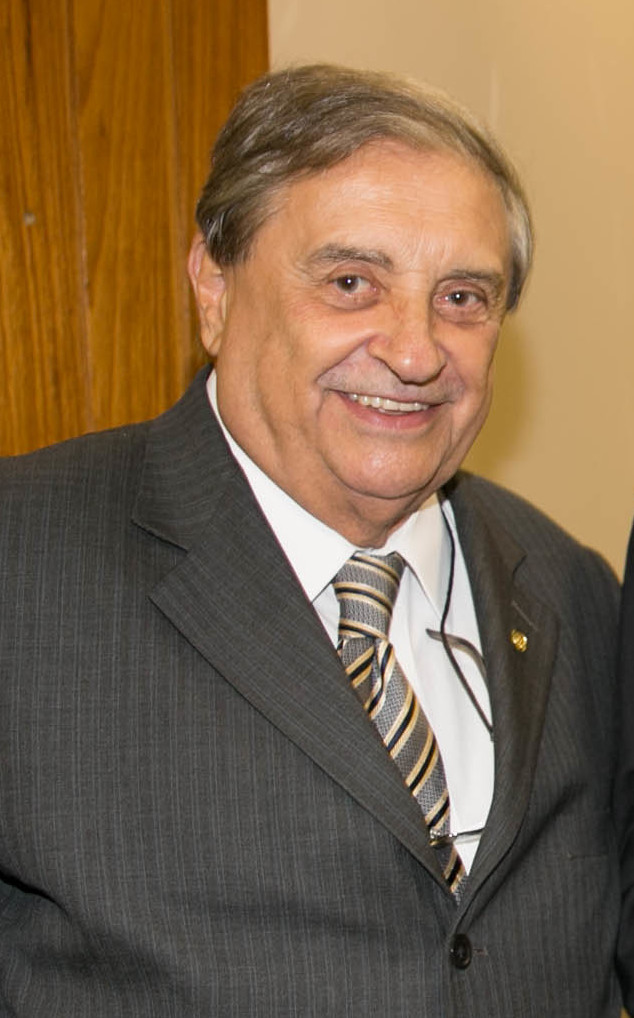
- de Abreu in 2015

Member of the Chamber of Deputies of Brazil
- In office 1 February 1995 – 1 February 2003
- Constituency: São Paulo

Personal details
- Born: José Masci de Abreu; 8 December 1944 São Paulo, Brazil
- Died: 3 June 2022 (aged 77) São Paulo, Brazil
- Party: PMDB (1980–1993); PSDB (1993–1999); PODE (1999–2022)
- Occupation: Businessman

José Masci de Abreu (8 December 1944 – 3 June 2022) was a Brazilian politician. A member of the Brazilian Social Democracy Party and later Podemos, he served in the Chamber of Deputies from 1995 to 2003.

He died in São Paulo on 3 June 2022, at the age of 77.
