= Janismo =

Political ideology of Jânio Quadros

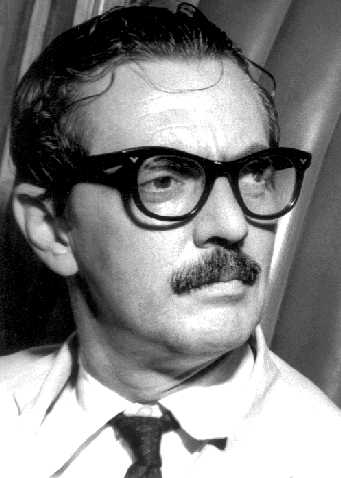
Jânio Quadros, after whom Janismo is named

Janismo is a political behavior and ideology often attributed to Jânio Quadros, the 22nd President of Brazil. It consisted of a conservative populism that aimed to mobilize the lower class, mainly composed of the working class, against the political elite.

== Background ==
During the term of former president Juscelino Kubitschek, the Brazilian government adopted a policy of developmentalism. It constructed the city of Brasília under the promise of development in national industry within 5 years.

== Main tenets ==
Janismo is defined by the electoral campaign promises and government actions under Jânio Quadros' presidency. The main goal of the ideology is to combat corruption. It is characterized as right-wing populism making opposition to Getulismo and Peronism. The difference between Jânismo and Vargas' Getulismo was in the way their policies targeted the lower class. While Vargas appealed to the working class for his promises of better living conditions, Jânio appealed to the same class using promises of bringing corrupt government officials to justice.

Other characteristics of Janismo include:

- Anti-communism and right-wing populism
- Non-alignment: Jânio refused to follow the viewpoints of his political coalition; he kept relations with Eastern-Bloc countries despite his party's conservative ideology. He also appointed ministers that were rivals of his political base in the Brazilian Congress.
- Anti-parliamentarian: After Jânio lost the support of the Brazilian Congress, he wrote a letter to the public declaring that the parliament was dominated by political elites who were trying to boycott his government. Jânio hoped to govern above the will of the legislative branch through gaining popular support.
- Anti-corruption: Jânio spread anti-corruption propaganda throughout his election campaign.
- Anti-Getulism: Janismo appealed to the labor class differently.
- Non-partisan politics: Jânio never compromised with any party, but "only with the masses", who he wanted to have trust in his leadership. According to historians Lilia Schwarcz and Heloísa Starling, Jânio made it clear that he was above all parties and traditional politicians.
- Jânio appealed to the public as a new kind of politician who opposed mainstream politics.

== Jan–Jan Movement ==
During the 1960 Brazilian presidential election, dissatisfied with the candidacy of Henrique Teixeira Lott (supported by the Brazilian Labour Party), syndicalists supported Jânio Quadros's candidacy for president, and that of João "Jango" Goulart, his rival, for vice-president. This non-formal coalition was named the "Jan–Jan Movement." For the first time in decades, a vice-president who ran in opposition was elected (Goulart was an ally of Jânio's main rival Kubitschek). Despite the disagreement between the leaders, Jânio was the favorite candidate of the working class.

== In modern days ==
Some modern right-wing politicians like Levy Fidelix and Fernando Chiarelli have made attacking the corruption of the Brazilian state in the Janismo fashion the main tenet of their campaign platforms. Some parties that generally follow the principles of Janismo are:

- Renewal Labour Movement: Created by Fernando Ferrari, a former member of the Brazilian Labour Party.
- National Labour Party: The first party inspired by Jânio, founded after his death.
- Brazilian Labour Renewal Party: The political party of Hamilton Mourão.
