= Uiraúna =

Coordinates: 06°31′04″S 38°24′43″W

- Municipality
- The Municipality of Uirauna
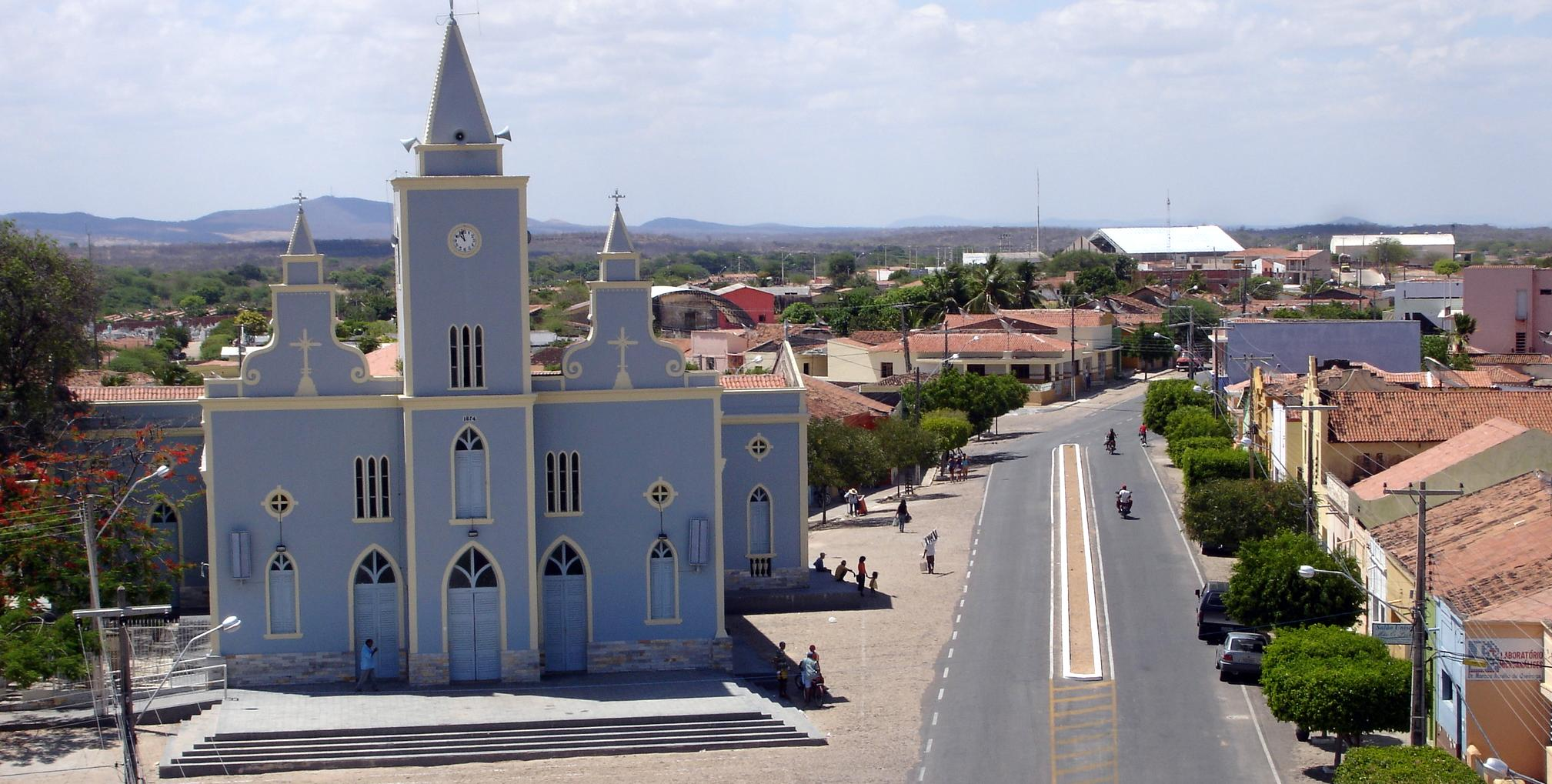
- Church of Jesus, Maria and José

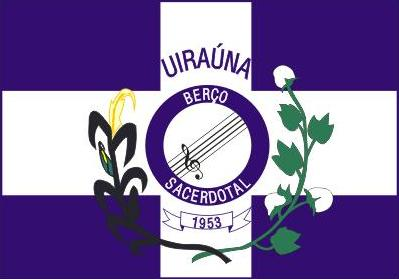
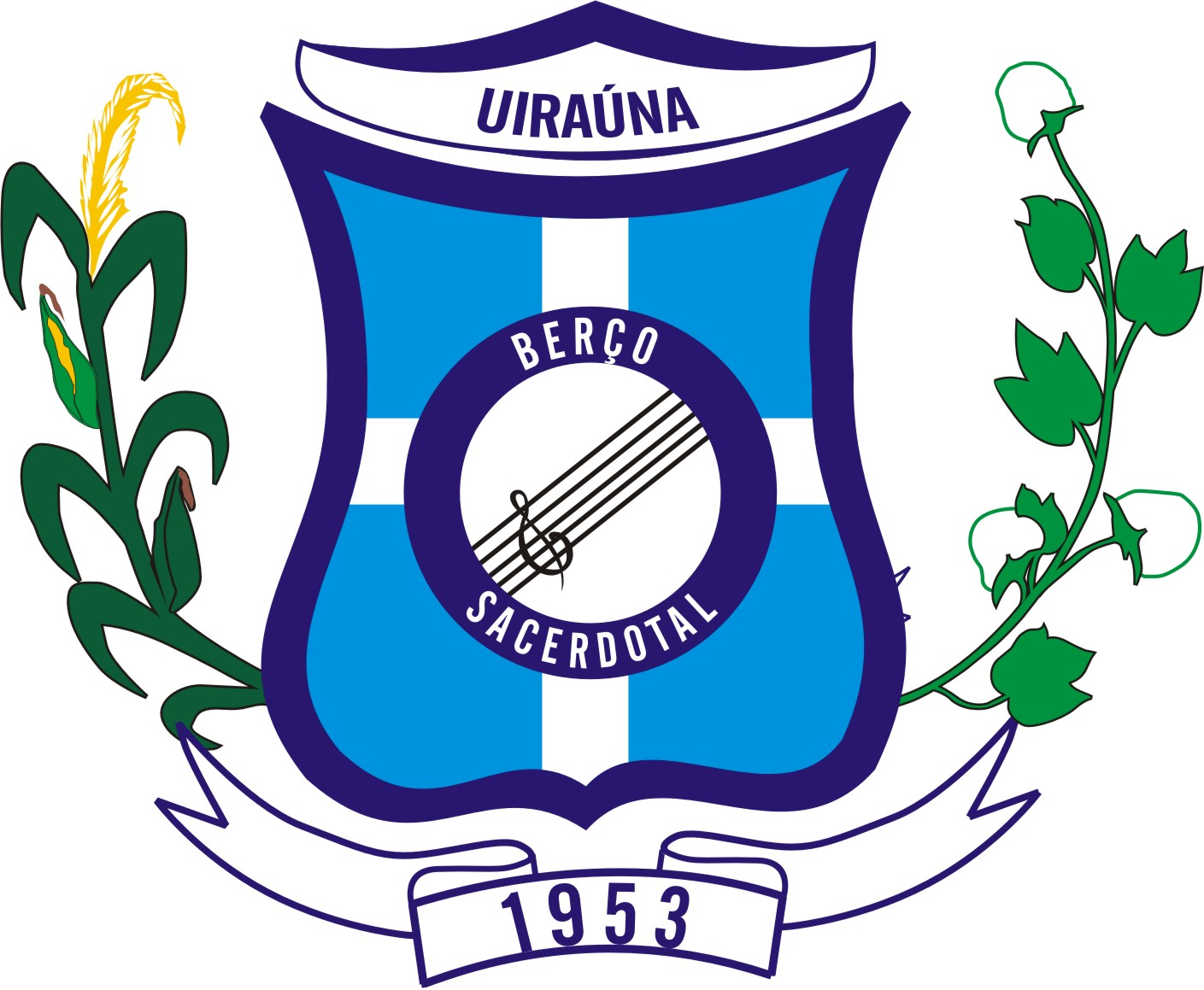
- Flag Coat of arms
- Nickname: Land of musicians and priests
- Location of Uirauna in the State of Paraíba

- Country: Brazil
- Region: Northeast
- State: Paraíba
- Founded: December 2, 1953

Government
  - Mayor: Maria Sulene Dantas Sarmento (MDB)

Area
  - Total: 294.495 km^{2} (113.705 sq mi)
- Elevation: 320 m (1,050 ft)

Population (2020)
  - Total: 15,300
  - Density: 49.1/km^{2} (127/sq mi)
- Time zone: UTC−3 (BRT)
- HDI (2000): 0.646 – medium
- Website: Uiraúna, Paraíba

Uiraúna is a municipality located in the Brazilian state of Paraíba.

== History ==
It is said that the town starts with the Indians Icós, branch of the tribe of Cariris Old, who chose the region that today is Uiraúna by the presence of fish from the river, which at the time was the main means of survival.

Around 1768 was donated to Alferes Moreira and Joao Nunes Leitão sesmaria of the number 323, in the colonial period, specifically at the time of capitanias hereditary. Following this, cattle farmers settled in the region, where they developed their business. The coming of creators had as the main reason the sugar competition with the West, who made several captains and colonels clearing the sertão go in search of the area for planting, but instead plant began to encourage more livestock and the front door would be of entry for the expansion of cotton growing.

Also in the period of slavery was born in Brazil, especially in the states of the Northeast and South, a new class of workers, the tropeiros, which had role of extreme importance to the towns and cities of the interior, because in the absence of trucks (which was invented in 1896, but for having very high cost only came to Brazil decades later) they were going in the conduct of troops of mules in other cities seek products that the interior needed. The tropeiros uiraunenses were known as "Tropeiros of the Hinterland" and generally went to Mossoró in search of rapadura, cotton and flour.

Following a jump in time and arrive in a period known as Old Republic is Bethlehem, land already well developed in that era was the scene of two major rebellions famous until today, they are the Coluna Prestes and Lampião. Coluna Miguel Costa-Prestes, better known by Coluna Prestes, was a politico-military movement that preached the dissatisfaction with the Old Republic, the requirement of secret ballots and the defense of public education, led by Luis Carlos Prestes rebellion passing through the land of Father France, first by the community of Aparecida, shortly after arriving at Luis Gomes and then returning to the land uiraunenses vai d'Water Dry Eye, then to Santa Umbelina and also to Quixaba, when part toward the city of Vieirópolis. Lampião was the most famous cangaceiro the history of Brazil, in Uiraúna their visits (1927) were considerably faster and both the first and second did the same path. A curious fact is the comment that was from the rearward of Lampião in the region which began to lose in their battles until eleven years later was dead.

Also in the corresponding period the Old Republic was a fact that influenced the formation of the city, this event was the uprising of Juazeiro, which was an armed confrontation between the oligarchies cearenses and the federal government caused by interference from the central power in state politics, or in 1911 the mayor of Juazeiro do Norte, Padre Cícero, decided not to accept some orders of the federal government, in response the government sent troops establishing a genuine internal conflict throughout cearense, so many people with fear of what could happen if refuge in other cities, thus four musicians from the town of Old Mission in Uiraúna stop and came in search of employment sought Father Costa that together had the idea of teaching music to uiraunenses thus was born in 1914 in Banda Costa Correia, which today is called Banda Jesus, Mary and Joseph and gives the council the title of land of musicians.

You cannot stop speaking in that rescue the past, cotton, as it had said before were the cattle farmers of the nineteenth century that gave great contribution to its development in these lands. The "white gold" as it was formerly called if adequou perfectly to the ground and uiraunense Paraíba, and as there were several high yield cotton plants came to Uiraúna, as SAMBRA and ALGASA. The city lived on cotton and its development came through it by bringing the PARAIBAN as banks, Caixa Economica Federal and Bradesco, but an insect from Central America, the bicudo, infested the entire Brazil bringing very high losses for the city as the prime example end of all these companies mentioned above and the loss of all production, leading Uiraúna and all Brazil to a serious crisis.

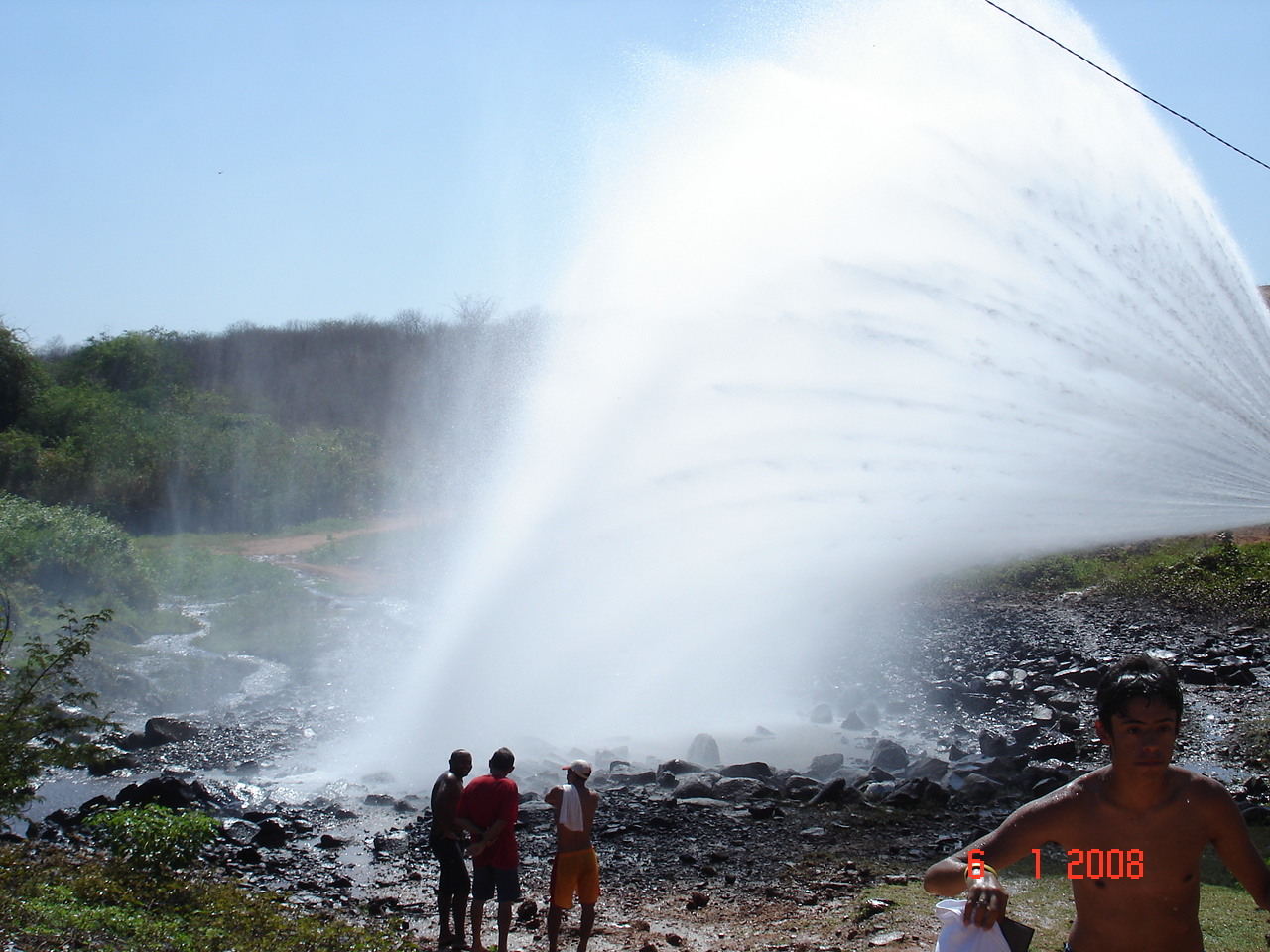
Point in the tourist area of rural Uiraúna - The dam of Capivara

Chegando in 1953, he seo former district, now emancipated and new name - Uiraúna - the first being appointed mayor by the governor of Paraiba, at the time, Joao Fernandes de Lima. The first elections were to happen was born in 1955 when the first parties and their respective lideranças.Comandado by Osvaldo Bezerra Cascudo the Social Democratic Party (PSD) was characterised on the national level, for its broad representation throughout Brazil and to be formed by politicians Conservatives associated with Getúlio Vargas, because the National Democratic Union (UDN) was led by Olinto Pinheiro which was characterised by the representation of the opposition in the city and also in Brazil. In a similar policy between the Brazilian and uiraunense, it is noted that both had similar characteristics, as in the period from 1945 to 1960 in Brazil only won the party linked to Vargas (PSD and PTB) and only by his populism in 1961 Jânio Quadros ( the UDN) was elected, also Uiraúna, from 1956 to 1963 it won only candidates linked to the PSD of Cascudo in 1964 and only the opposition Joaquim Moreira (UDN) is also elected by his populism and his innovative ideas.

In 1964 Brazil was through enormous transformations generated by the coup, leading to military dictatorship, which shook the nation and brought profound changes. Because at the time a city of small, the impact of the scheme were not as large in area, only on the wheels of society was discussed the matter and some students and teachers protested what was happening, but not entusiasmaram to rebel. The changes were small, only the PSD of Cascudo has been called MDB and UDN, Olinto became the ARENA.

== Emancipation policy ==
The struggle for political autonomy began around 1942, and completed only on December 2, 1953, under State Law, number 972. Signed by the then governor of Paraiba, João Fernandes de Lima, the law provided for the official installation of the municipality of December 27 of that year. On this date was sworn the first mayor Adolfo Rodrigues.

The main supporter of autonomy was Osvaldo Bezerra Cascudo, with the contribution of the state then Mr Fernando Carrilho Milanez.

== Geography ==
According to the IBGE (IBGE) in the year 2020 the population was estimated at 15,300 inhabitants. Territorial area of 295 square km. It had in recent years a great economic growth influenced mainly by trade, which is their main activity.

=== Topography ===
Land plans casualties and little Highlighting the most high - Mastruço Peak, located in the town of Quixaba de Cima.

=== Hydrography ===
The rainfall on average is approximately 300 to 500 ml per year. The council has no rivers importance, only there is the River of fish - temporary, whose source is in Sierra council's Tank, draining the area of the town of Fazenda Nova (Buenos Aires) following towards city of St. John of the Rio Fish. It noted that the city's water supply is from the Açude Public Arrojado.

=== Economy ===
The large contingent rural farming has low technology as the main means of existence, since the primary economy has significant share in GDP township. In this perspective, it is agricultural activity in the polyculture of beans, maize, rice, sugar cane-of-ácuçar and cultivation of cassava and banana and coconut in the regions of land roxa. A livestock, is operated through the creation of extensive cattle, sheep, goats and pigs.

In the secondary sector, activity that turns crude into products subject to consumption, it is small indútrias that make use of low-tech and manufacturing atersanal to produce materials for cleaning, seasonings, soy milk and solar cooker. As there is an exception factory processing of maize, which is used for advanced technology.

Most of the urban population is connected tertiary activities. The movement of goods in recent years took a step forward both internally and externally given the expectations surrounding municipalities of becoming a major commercial center with great influence from the states of Ceara and Rio Grande do Norte.

== Famous people ==
- Luiza Erundina - Ex-mayor of São Paulo
