= Renata Abreu =

Brazilian politician (born 1982)

- Official portrait, 2023

Member of the Chamber of Deputies
- Incumbent
- Assumed office 1 February 2015
- Constituency: São Paulo

Podemos National President
- Incumbent
- Assumed office 1 July 2017

Personal details
- Born: Renata Hellmeister de Abreu; 15 April 1982 (age 44) São Paulo, Brazil
- Party: PODE (2001–present)
- Children: 2
- Education: Mackenzie Presbyterian University
- Website: www.renataabreuoficial.com.br

Renata Hellmeister de Abreu (born 15 April 1982) is a Brazilian politician. She is a federal deputy for the state of São Paulo and president of the political party Podemos.

== Personal life ==
Abreu is the daughter of the founder of the Podemos party José Masci de Abreu and niece of the co-founder Dorival de Abreu. Her mother is Cristina Hellmeister de Abreu, and she is married to Gabriel Melo and has two children. Abreu is an alumna of the Mackenzie Presbyterian University.

== Political career ==
Since her time as president of Podemos, Abreu has been successful in persuading other politicians to join her party. Only 8 politicians from the Podemos party were elected to the federal chamber of deputies in the 2014 election, but in April 2018 Abrue managed to persuade a further 14 politicians to switch parties, boosting the number of Podemos in the legislature to 22.

Abreu voted in favor of the impeachment of then-president Dilma Rousseff. Abreu voted in favor of the 2017 Brazilian labor reform, and would vote in favor of a corruption investigation into Rousseff's successor Michel Temer.

Party political offices
New political party	National President of Podemos; 2017–present	Incumbent
