= Luis Favre =

Argentine-born Brazilian journalist and political activist (born 1949)

First Gentleman of São Paulo
- In office 20 September 2003 – 1 January 2005
- Mayor: Marta Suplicy
- Preceded by: Eduardo Suplicy
- Succeeded by: Mónica Serra (as First Lady)

Personal details
- Born: Felipe Belisario Wermus; 1949 (age 76–77) Buenos Aires, Argentina
- Party: PT (since 1986)
- Spouse: Marta Suplicy (m. 2003; div. 2009)
- Children: 2
- Relatives: Jorge Altamira (brother)

Luis Favre (born in Buenos Aires, Argentina 1949) is the pseudonym of Argentine-born Brazilian journalist and political activist Felipe Belisario Wermus. Favre joined the political party Politica Obrera as a young man. Later, he moved to France and became a member of the Internationalist Communist Organisation (ICO), working especially in its international department. He moved to Brazil and became a critic of Pierre Lambert during the Fourth International tendency within ICO. He would later leave the party to become a member of the Partido dos Trabalhadores (PT). He is known to a broader public in Brazil as the second husband of Marta Smith de Vasconcelos Suplicy, former congresswoman and mayor of São Paulo through PT. Since 1986 he has been an aide to the National Secretariat of International Relations of PT, attending various international events on its behalf. He is linked to a group of former Trotskyists within PT known colloquially as the "Libelu" (named after their tendency, "Liberdade e Luta" or "Freedom and Fight"), which supports Luiz Inácio Lula da Silva's wing.

His brother, José Saul Wermus (best known as Jorge Altamira), is the main leader of Partido Obrero (Politica Obrera's successor). His other siblings are also active within that party in Argentina.

Honorary titles
Preceded by Eduardo Suplicy	First Gentleman of São Paulo; 2003–2005	Succeeded by Mónica Serra as First Lady
