= Marta Suplicy =

Brazilian politician and psychologist

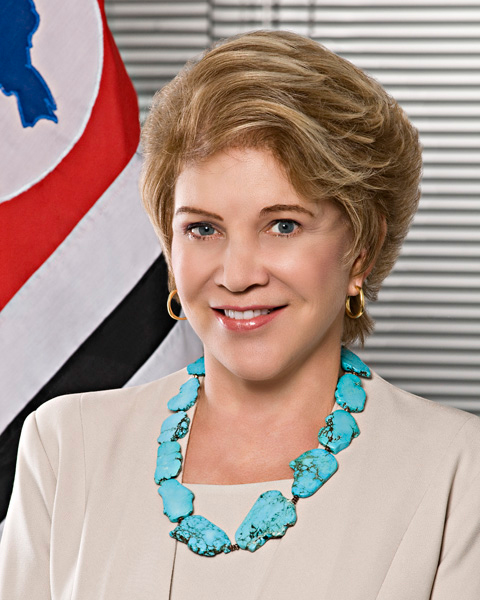

Secretary of International Relations of São Paulo
- In office 1 January 2021 – 9 January 2024
- Mayor: Bruno Covas; Ricardo Nunes
- Preceded by: Luiz Aguiar de Menezes
- Succeeded by: Aldo Rebelo

Senator for São Paulo
- In office 1 February 2011 – 1 February 2019
- Preceded by: Alfredo Cotait
- Succeeded by: Mara Gabrilli

Minister of Culture
- In office 13 September 2012 – 11 November 2014
- President: Dilma Rousseff
- Preceded by: Ana de Hollanda
- Succeeded by: Ana Cristina Wanzeler

Minister of Tourism
- In office 23 March 2007 – 3 June 2008
- President: Luiz Inácio Lula da Silva
- Preceded by: Walfrido dos Mares Guia
- Succeeded by: Luis Barreto Filho

Mayor of São Paulo
- In office 1 January 2001 – 1 January 2005
- Deputy: Hélio Bicudo
- Preceded by: Celso Pitta
- Succeeded by: José Serra

Member of the Chamber of Deputies
- In office 1 February 1995 – 1 February 1999
- Constituency: São Paulo

Personal details
- Born: Marta Teresa Smith de Vasconcellos; 18 March 1945 (age 81) São Paulo, São Paulo, Brazil
- Party: PT (since 2024)
- Other political affiliations: PT (1981–2015); MDB (2015–18); Solidariedade (2020); Independent (2020–24)
- Spouses: Eduardo Suplicy (m. 1964; div. 2001) Luis Favre (m. 2003; div. 2009) Márcio Toledo (m. 2013)
- Children: 3, including Supla
- Education: Pontifical Catholic University of São Paulo (PUC-SP); Stanford University
- Profession: Politician, psychologist, psychoanalyst
- Website: www.martasuplicy.com.br

Marta Teresa Smith de Vasconcellos Suplicy (Portuguese pronunciation: [ˈmaʁtɐ supliˈsi]; born 18 March 1945) is a Brazilian politician, sexologist and psychologist. She was Mayor of São Paulo from 2001 to 2004. She later served as the Brazilian Minister of Tourism between 14 March 2007, and 4 June 2008, when she resigned to run again for the mayoralty of São Paulo. In 2015, she left the Brazilian Workers' Party (PT), but she returned to the party in January 2024 in order to be the running mate of Guilherme Boulos in the 2024 São Paulo mayoral election.

== Career ==
Marta Suplicy attended Michigan State University (1966–68), and Pontifícia Universidade Católica de São Paulo (1969–75); she did graduate work at Stanford University (1973). Suplicy started her career as a TV anchorwoman, providing sex advice on a popular show named TV Mulher (Woman TV), broadcast by Rede Globo.

=== PT ===
While serving as Congresswoman, she proposed a gay civil unions act. After running for governor of São Paulo and losing to Mário Covas of the Brazilian Social Democracy Party (PSDB) in 1998, she was elected mayor of the state capital, São Paulo, in 2000.

==== Mayor of São Paulo ====
Her administration of the city is marked by the changes she made to the city's bus system, creating a ticket that is valid for a period of two hours, called bilhete único. In the public educational system she created large schools and cultural centers, called "CEU", which were built in the poorest districts of the city. Towards the end of her administration, she began the construction of several underpasses which alleviated traffic in certain points of the city. She also increased many existing municipal taxes as well as creating new ones. In 2004, she ran for a second term, but was unseated by former PSDB presidential candidate José Serra.

==== National Politics ====
On 14 March 2007, Suplicy accepted the Luiz Inácio Lula da Silva's invitation to become the new Minister of Tourism. Later that same year, on 13 June 2007, when interviewed about the 2006–2007 Brazilian aviation crisis, Suplicy suggested that users of the Congonhas Airport in São Paulo who suffered long delays while heading for vacation should "relax and enjoy because they will forget the troubles afterwards" (Portuguese: "relaxa e goza porque você vai esquecer dos transtornos."). Her speech included a double entendre, as the word she used for "enjoy" can also refer to an orgasm.

On 3 October 2010, Suplicy was elected for the Federal Senate of Brazil, becoming the top voted female Senator ever, receiving over 8.3 million votes. She is also the first female ever elected Senator from São Paulo, the most populous state of Brazil. She promised to fight for the approval of PLC 122, a bill criminalizing homophobia, and also reintroduced the same-sex civil unions bill. The latter received its first victory in the Senate Human Rights Committee on 24 May 2012.

=== MDB ===
In 2016, after leaving the PT and joining the PMDB, Suplicy vigorously supported Vice President Michel Temer and President of Congress Eduardo Cunha in the move to impeach her former political party colleague President Dilma Rousseff. Suplicy's decision was deemed divisive by many, including her son, Supla, who proclaimed, "Minha mãe é golpista, meu pai é petista e eu sou anarquista. Momentos políticos difíceis, né" ("My mother is a coup-plotter, my father is a member of the PT, and I am an anarchist. Difficult times, huh?").

== Family ==
Suplicy has three sons, one of whom is the musician Supla. From 1965 to 2001, she was married to Eduardo Suplicy, a PT Brazilian senator from the state of São Paulo who is the father of her children. Later, she married Luis Favre, whom she divorced after a relationship of nearly eight years. She currently dates Márcio Toledo, ex-president of the Jockey Club of São Paulo.

== Electoral history ==
Year	Election	Party	Office	Coalition	Partners	Party	Votes	Percent	Result
1994	State Elections of São Paulo	PT	Federal Deputy	Popular Brazil Front SP (PT, PSB, PPS, PCdoB, PCB, PMN, PSTU)	—N/a		76,132	0.41%	Elected
1998	State Elections of São Paulo	PT	Governor	To Renew São Paulo (PT, PCdoB, PCB, PPS, PMN)	Newton Lima	PT	3,738,750	22.51%	Not elected
2000	Municipal Election of São Paulo	PT	Mayor	Change São Paulo (PT, PCdoB, PCB, PHS)	Hélio Bicudo	PT	2,205,013	34.40%	Runoff
2000	Municipal Election of São Paulo	PT	Mayor	Change São Paulo (PT, PCdoB, PCB, PHS)	Hélio Bicudo	PT	3,247,900	58.51%	Elected
2004	Municipal Election of São Paulo	PT	Mayor	Union for São Paulo (PT, PCdoB, PRTB, PTN, PSL, PTB, PL)	Rui Falcão	PT	2,209,264	35.82%	Runoff
2004	Municipal Election of São Paulo	PT	Mayor	Union for São Paulo (PT, PCdoB, PRTB, PTN, PSL, PTB, PL)	Rui Falcão	PT	2,270,152	45.14%	Not elected
2008	Municipal Election of São Paulo	PT	Mayor	A New Attitude for São Paulo (PT, PCdoB, PDT, PTN, PRB, PSB)	Aldo Rebelo	PCdoB	2,088,329	32.79%	Runoff
2008	Municipal Election of São Paulo	PT	Mayor	A New Attitude for São Paulo (PT, PCdoB, PDT, PTN, PRB, PSB)	Aldo Rebelo	PCdoB	2,452,527	39.28%	Not elected
2010	State Elections of São Paulo	PT	Senator	Union to Change (PT, PDT, PR, PCdoB, PRB, PSDC, PRP, PRTB, PTN, PTdoB)	Antonio Carlos Rodrigues	PR	8,314,027	22.61%	Elected
2010	State Elections of São Paulo	PT	Senator	Union to Change (PT, PDT, PR, PCdoB, PRB, PSDC, PRP, PRTB, PTN, PTdoB)	Paulo Frateschi	PT	8,314,027	22.61%	Elected
2016	Municipal Election of São Paulo	MDB	Mayor	Union for São Paulo (PMDB, PSD)	Andrea Matarazzo	PSD	587,220	10.14%	Not elected
2024	Municipal Election of São Paulo	PT	Vice Mayor	Love for São Paulo (PSOL REDE Fed., FE Brasil, PDT, PMB, PCB)	Guilherme Boulos	PSOL	1,776,127	29.07%	Runoff
2024	Municipal Election of São Paulo	PT	Vice Mayor	Love for São Paulo (PSOL REDE Fed., FE Brasil, PDT, PMB, PCB)	Guilherme Boulos	PSOL	2,323,901	40.65%	Not elected

Political offices
Preceded by Celso Pitta	Mayor of São Paulo; 2001–2004	Succeeded by José Serra
Preceded by Walfrido dos Mares Guia	Minister of Tourism; 2007–2008	Succeeded by Luis Barreto Filho
Preceded by Ana de Hollanda	Minister of Culture; 2012–2014	Succeeded by Ana Cristina Wanzeler
Preceded by Luiz Aguiar de Menezes	Municipal Secretary of International Relations of São Paulo; 2021–2024	Succeeded by Aldo Rebelo
Party political offices
Preceded by Aloizio Mercadante	PT nominee for Mayor of São Paulo; 2000, 2004, 2008	Succeeded by Fernando Haddad
Preceded by Gabriel Chalita	PMDB nominee for Mayor of São Paulo; 2016	Succeeded by Ricardo Nunes (2024)
Preceded by Carlos Zarattini	PT nominee for Vice Mayor of São Paulo; 2024	Most recent
