= Faculty of Architecture and Urbanism, University of São Paulo =

Coordinates: 23°33′36″S 46°43′47″W

Faculdade de Arquitetura e Urbanismo da Universidade de São Paulo
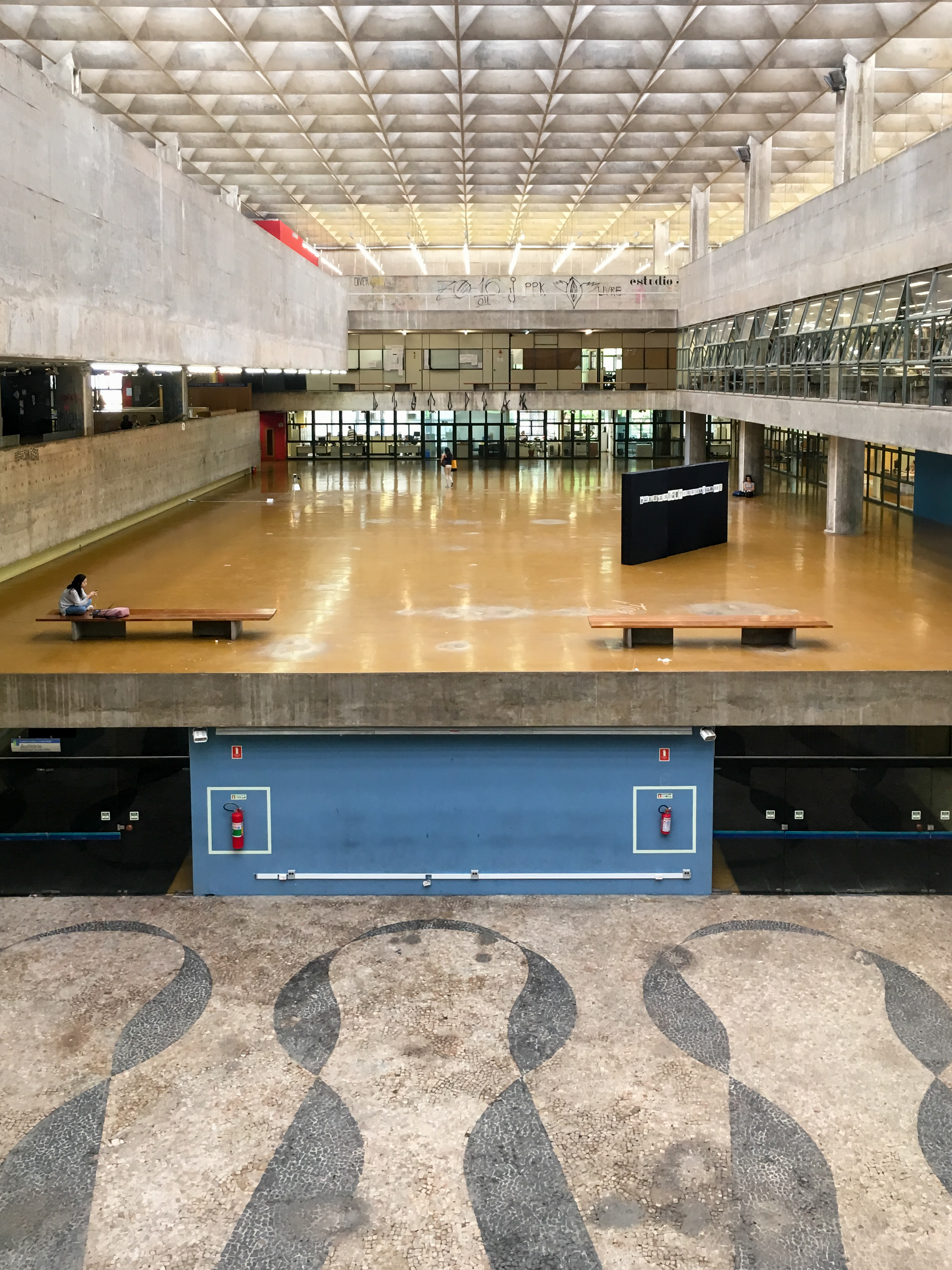
- Type: Public
- Established: 1948
- Location: São Paulo, São Paulo State, Brazil
- Website: www.fau.usp.br

The Architecture and Urbanism College, University of São Paulo (Portuguese: Faculdade de Arquitetura e Urbanismo da Universidade de São Paulo) (usually called FAU, or FAUUSP) is an architecture and design school in the University of São Paulo in Brazil. It was founded in 1948 by a group of teachers from Polytechnic School of the University of São Paulo.

The current school building was designed by João Batista Vilanova Artigas. It contains a central atrium representing the power of collaboration, with a main ramp up through the building, and skylights. The atrium was designed both to host political and cultural events, and to foster conversation. Classrooms are around the outside edge of the building. It was built in 1968, and designed to reflect austerity rather than consumerism. It was inaugurated in 1969 and is considered one of the main representatives of architectural modernism in Brazil.

Vilanova Artigas was a faculty member of the school, and also helped create the original school's curriculum, a Bauhaus-style program giving equal footing to technical skills, history, and design. During the early 2000s, there were internal discussions in the University that led to the creation of the Design course in 2006.
