= Podemos (Brazil) =

Brazilian political party

We Can Podemos
- Abbreviation: PODE
- President: Renata Abreu
- Secretary-General: Luiz Cláudio França
- Vice President: Everaldo Pereira
- Founded: 1 May 1995
- Split from: Brazilian Labour Party
- Headquarters: SHIS QI 9, Conj. 6, Casa 7 – Lago Sul, Brasília, Brazil
- Think tank: Fundação Podemos
- Youth wing: Podemos Jovem
- Women's wing: Podemos Mulher
- LGBT wing: Podemos Diversidade
- Black wing: Podemos Afro
- Membership (2022): 404,107
- Ideology: Economic liberalism; Anti-corruption; Direct democracy; Historically: Labourism; Janismo
- Political position: Centre-right
- Colors: Green; Blue
- Slogan: 'Together we can'
- TSE Identification Number: 20 (since 2024); 19 (1995–2024)
- Chamber of Deputies: 15 / 513
- Federal Senate: 6 / 81

Website
- podemos.org.br

Podemos (PODE, [poˈdemus], lit. 'We can'), previously known as the National Labour Party (Portuguese: Partido Trabalhista Nacional, PTN) is a centre-right Brazilian political party. Historically labourist and Janist, since 2016 the party shifted its focus to support anti-corruption policies and direct democracy.

Led by the Abreu family (José Masci de Abreu, Dorival de Abreu, and Renata Abreu) since its foundation in 1995, the PTN claimed lineage with the original National Labour Party, the party of former President of Brazil Jânio Quadros, which was banned in 1965, and his ideology of Janism. In 2016, PTN changed its name to Podemos (lit. 'We can'), claiming that the inspiration for its name was the slogan of Barack Obama's campaign slogan "Yes, we can", claiming a new program based on greater citizen participation, transparency in politics, and direct democracy. However, most political scientists classify it as a member of the Centrão, a bloc of centrist and center-right parties known for their pragmatic alliances and support for the government in exchange for political influence and resources. With the change of name and program, Podemos grew rapidly, achieving a large bench of the Chamber of Deputies and Federal Senate.

In 2018, the party chose Senator Alvaro Dias as its candidate for the presidency of Brazil.

In 2018, the Humanist Party of Solidarity merged into Podemos. In 2022, the Social Christian Party announced plans to merge into Podemos. In 2023, the merge was approved by the Superior Electoral Court.

== History ==
=== National Labour Party (1995–2016) ===
Originally, PTN used the same logo as Jânio Quadros' original PTN

The logo used until 2016

The PTN was founded in May 1995, gaining provisional registration in the same year. In 1996, led by former congressman Dorival de Abreu, the party obtained its definitive registration. After the death of Dorival, the party was led by his brother and former congressman José de Abreu. In the presidential election of 1998 the PTN chose its secretary-general Thereza Ruiz as its candidate; she obtained 166,053 votes.

In the 2014 elections, the PTN elected four congressmen—Bacelar, Renata Abreu (daughter of José de Abreu, and currently the national president of the party), Christiane de Souza Yared and Delegate Edson Moreira—and 14 state deputies. In 2016, several politicians changed their party and some of them joined the PTN, which now has 18 congressmen and 5 senators.

The PTN was the party that had the greatest proportional growth in the local elections of 2016.

=== Podemos (2016–present) ===
Logo used before the 2023 merger with the Social Christian Party in 2023 led to the change in the electoral number of the party from 19 to 20.

In December 2016, the then National Labour Party changed its name and was renamed Podemos. Based on research and consulting studies, the organization was renamed inspired in the chant "Yes, we can" from the 2008 Barack Obama campaign to the presidency. According to the party's leadership, Podemos was inspired by an international line of movements that propose to listen to people, defend causes of collective interest and together decide the future of the nation, a model that claims to leave the old dispute between left or right and chooses to go forward, every day dividing more the country's decisions with the population. Podemos believes it is the answer to a generation that understands that it is not the youth who does not want to know about politics, but this politics that does not know how to talk to the youth. The leadership of Podemos also understands that the party is part of a society that today is mobilized through causes related to people's daily life, contrary to what they consider as stagnant political parties in outmoded models that seek only to remain in power. Podemos arose in a historical context in which the vast majority of Brazilians have no party preference and do not believe in the old political parties and the old politics.

After the JBS plea bargain, Podemos was the first party to leave the allied base of the Michel Temer government on 18 May 2017, also leaving the party bloc of which it integrated alongside Progressive (PP) and Labour Party of Brazil (PTdoB) parties and then declaring independence in relation to government. Podemos became represented in the Federal Senate with the affiliation of Alvaro Dias (ex Green) and Romário, who left the Social Democratic Party at the end of June. In August, the party received the affiliation of José Medeiros (ex Social Democrat), senator by Mato Grosso. In November, Podemos expelled state congressmen who voted to free Jorge Picciani, the president of Alerj, Paulo Melo and Edson Albertassi from the prison, who were the target of Operação Cadeia Velha. After this episode, Podemos also expelled a congressman that accepted the position of Minister of the Cities in President Michel Temer's cabinet.

In July 2017, the party made an online poll to decide how congresswoman Renata Abreu should vote regarding the complaint of passive corruption against President Temer in the Commission of Constitution and Justice. Later, Podemos made other online polls to decide how their parliament members should vote on welfare reform and the end of legal immunity.

In the 2018 general election, Podemos formed a coalition with the Social Christian Party, the Christian Labour Party and the Progressive Republican Party in support of the candidacy of Alvaro Dias for president. Dias obtained 859,601 votes (0.80%); the party performed well in parliamentary election, electing 11 deputies and one senator. Dias endorsed Bolsonaro in the second round.

On 21 December 2018, the Humanist Party of Solidarity merged into Podemos, increasing its parliamentary representation to 17 deputies and seven senators and turning Podemos into the third group in the Senate. Podemos later joined Bolsonaro's majority.

== Ideology ==
According to the party's president Renata Abreu, Podemos is not about left and right, but forward, with more democracy to decide the future of the country together. In the classical analysis of the political sciences, Podemos is defined as the center, with liberal proposals in the economy as well as distribution and income, when it comes to social development. This ideology, which is based on defending causes, results in three principles, namely transparency, popular participation and direct democracy, to jointly decide the future of Brazil. In this line, Podemos intends to give voice to people who do not feel represented by the current Brazilian political parties.

Podemos believes that the Brazilian people need to know well who they voted for, what they stand for and their decisions. For Podemos, transparency means the right of the population to know what happens in the country and thus avoid corruption. Podemos believes that Brazil needs more popular participation in politics, such as people being part of the governments, in the decisions of their neighborhoods, consultations to help the mayor, suggestions for their cities or collaborating to improve their states and country. The party is known for making online consultations on topics under discussion in the Congress and for committing to present projects that have the signature of at least 20,000 voters. For Podemos, a country is made with the participation of the people, day by day, every day. Among the projects and proposals defended in the agenda, the party presented through its president PEC 185-2015, authored by Renata Abreu, which turns to law the right of access to the internet for each Brazilian citizen, guaranteeing access to information and the possibility of participating in decisions. Podemos also believes that the true definition of the word democracy is to gradually share decision making with the people. The party defends more mechanisms of direct democracy in Brazil, either through plebiscites, referendums like the PEC 330/2017 authored by Renata Abreu who proposes that in each election the people can vote in more than candidates, but also in important subjects of interest of most people, popular referendums as advocated by PEC 331/2017, also by congresswoman Renata Abreu, to include in the constitution the right of the people to veto laws that have already been approved, or recall as proposed by the projects of candidate for the presidency Alvaro Dias (PEC 37/2016) and Renata Abreu (PEC 332/2017), so that the citizen can participate in the decision making, asserting his right to participate directly in the whole democratic process.

After pastor Marco Feliciano and pastor Cabo Daciolo (the latter of whom advocated the transformation of Brazil into a theocracy) entered PODE in 2018, the party shifted toward a more social conservative direction, although both would leave a few years later to join other parties.

== Policies ==
- End of legal Immunity and other privileges: end to privileges and corruption, reinforced by the bill PEC 333/2017 by Senator Alvaro Dias which aims to end the legal immunity.
- Ensure imprisonment after second instance: against impunity in the country, legitimize the imprisonment in second instance as in the bill filed by Senator Alvaro Dias.
- Transparency in all the public accounts: disclose all government accounts in a transparency portal, including your spending, contracts and budgets, so anyone can see.
- End to compulsory voting: adopt the optional vote in Brazil as proposed by the bill PEC 11/2015, authored by Senator Alvaro Dias.
- Recall Elections: adopt the recall system to revoke the mandate of bad rulers as proposed by Renata Abreu and Alvaro Dias in PEC 37/2016.
- Open a public debt audit of the country: open an application for a public debt audit in Brazil to know the exact financial situation of the country.
- Population guide the vote of its parliament members: create a law so that the voters can decide the votes of the parliamentarians on more important projects.
- Include plebiscites and referendums to each election: at each election include to vote plebiscites or referendums on important issues as proposed by Alvaro Dias on the reduction of the criminal majority.
- Internet access as a right to all the Brazilians: make the internet a right for every Brazilian citizen as proposed by the bill PEC 185-2015, authored by Renata Abreu.
- Defend the population's interest in causes: open to vote the most important causes for the population, so that they can define the priorities of the government.

== Leadership ==
List of current party leaders including House of Representatives and Senate members:

- Renata Abreu, congresswoman and president of Podemos
- Alvaro Dias, senator
- Oriovisto Guimarães, senator
- Adail Carneiro, congressman
- Cajar Nardes, congressman
- Dâmina Pereira, congresswoman
- Dr. Sinval Malheiros, congressman
- Ezequiel Cortaz Teixeira, congressman
- Francisco Chapadinha, congressman
- Jozi Araújo, congresswoman
- Laudivio Carvalho, congressman
- Marcelo Ortiz, congressman
- Ricardo Teobaldo, congressman

== Plan for Brazil ==
Podemos states thats its policies on transparency, more participation and direct democracy are intended to pass legislation, elect new leaders and change the country's political system. The party's platform includes street-level activism, proposed legislation in Congress and the use of mobile-phone voting technology along with backing Álavro Dias as a presidential candidate. According to Podemos, these measures are intended to gradually replace the existing political system which the party describes as marked by corruption. The party has set ten years time frame for this process, stating its desire to transform Brazil into a more correct, fair and transparent nation that truly represents its population.

== Electoral results ==
=== Presidential elections ===
Year	Image	Candidate	Vice presidential candidate	Political alliance	Votes	%	Placing
1998		Thereza Ruiz (PTN)	Eduardo Gomes (PTN)	No coalition	166,138	0.25	10th
2018		Alvaro Dias (PODE)	Paulo Rabello de Castro (PSC)	PODE, PSC, PTC, PRP	859,574	0.8	9th
2022		Simone Tebet (MDB)	Mara Gabrilli (PSDB)	MDB, PSDB, Cidadania, PODE	4,915,423	4.16	3rd

=== Legislative elections ===
Election	Chamber of Deputies				Federal Senate				Role in government
Election	Votes	%	Seats	+/–	Votes	%	Seats	+/–	Role in government
1998	64,712	0.10%	0 / 513	New	42,042	0.07%	0 / 81	New	Extra-parliamentary
2002	118,471	0.14%	0 / 513	0	107,122	0.07%	0 / 81	0	Extra-parliamentary
2006	149,809	0.16%	0 / 513	0	11,063	0.01%	0 / 81	0	Extra-parliamentary
2010	182,926	0.19%	0 / 513	0	6,013	0.00%	0 / 81	0	Extra-parliamentary
2014	723,182	0.74%	4 / 513	▲4	2,741	0.00%	0 / 81	0	Opposition (2014–2016)
2014	723,182	0.74%	4 / 513	▲4	2,741	0.00%	0 / 81	0	Independent (2016–2018)
2018	2,243,320	2.28%	11 / 513	▲7	5,494,125	3.21%	5 / 81	▲5	Independent
2022	3,614,581	3.28%	12 / 513	▲1	1,776,283	1.75%	6 / 81	▲1	Opposition (2022–2023)
2022	3,614,581	3.28%	12 / 513	▲1	1,776,283	1.75%	6 / 81	▲1	Independent (2023–2024)
2022	3,614,581	3.28%	12 / 513	▲1	1,776,283	1.75%	6 / 81	▲1	Opposition (2024–present)
2026	5,887,427	5.17%	27 / 513	▲15	3,951,521	1.91%	2 / 81	▼4	TBA

Preceded by 18 - NETWORK (REDE)	Numbers of Brazilian Official Political Parties; 20 - PODE	Succeeded by 21 – BCP (PCB)
