= List of mayors of São Paulo =

Mayor of São Paulo
- Prefeito de São Paulo
- Coat of arms of São Paulo

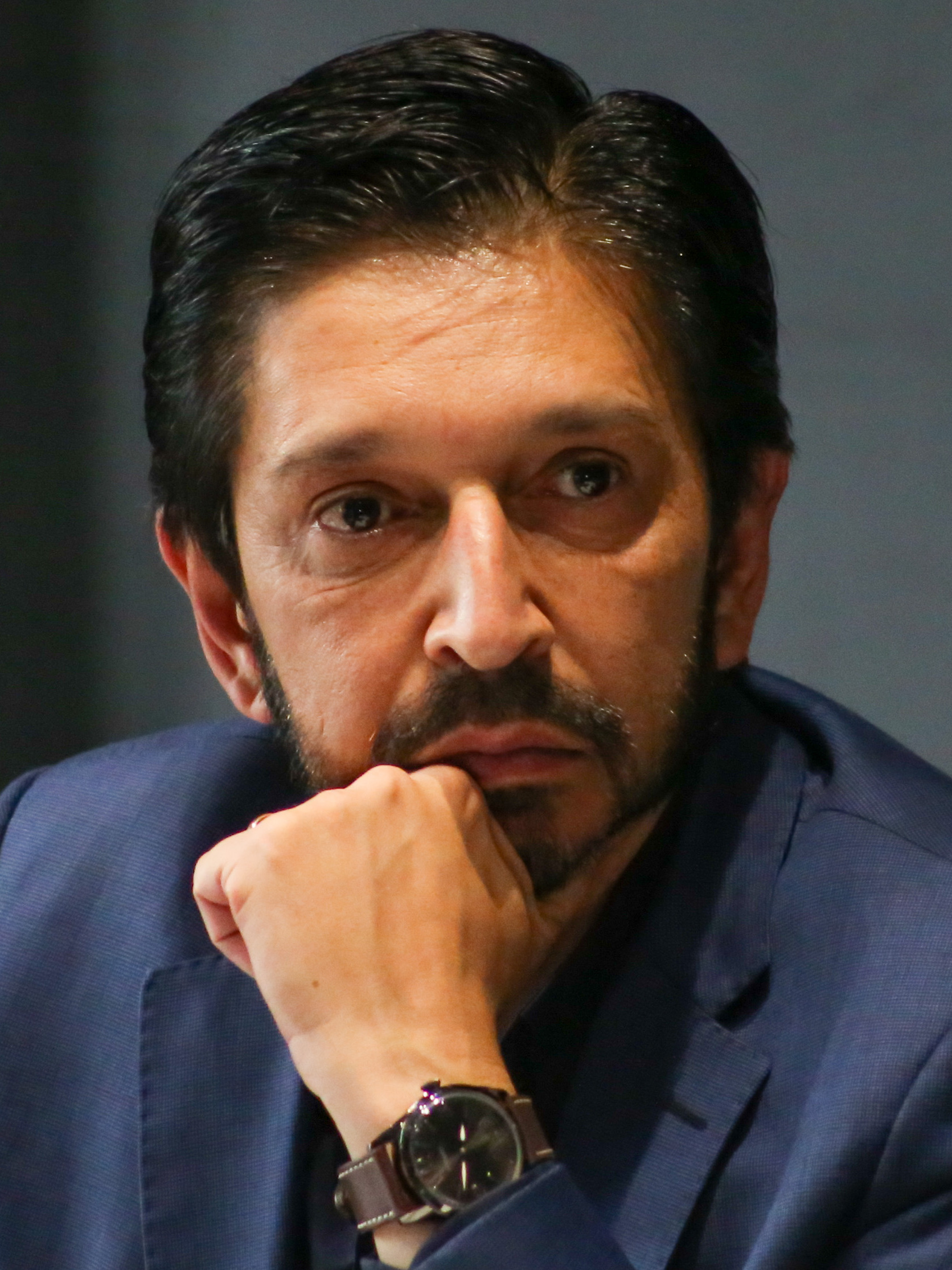
- Incumbent; Ricardo Nunes since 16 May 2021
- São Paulo Municipal Government
- Seat: Matarazzo Building, São Paulo
- Term length: Four years, renewable once consecutively
- Constituting instrument: Organic Law of São Paulo
- Inaugural holder: Antônio da Silva Prado
- Formation: 7 January 1899; 127 years ago
- Deputy: Vice Mayor of São Paulo
- Salary: R$ 35,462
- Website: www.capital.sp.gov.br

This is a listing of all those that have served as the mayor of the city of São Paulo, Brazil.

== First Republic (1899–1930) ==
Portrait	Mayor	Took office	Left office	Time in office	Party	Election	Vice Mayor
Antônio da Silva Prado	Antônio da Silva Prado (1840–1929)	7 January 1899	15 January 1911	12 years, 8 days	Independent	1899–1907; 1907	Pedro Vicente de Azevedo (PRP); Asdrúbal Augusto do Nascimento (PRP)
Raimundo da Silva Duprat	Raimundo da Silva Duprat (1863–1926)	15 January 1911	15 January 1914	3 years, 0 days	PRP	1911–1913	João de Sampaio Viana (PRP)
Washington Luís	Washington Luís (1869–1957)	15 January 1914	15 August 1919	5 years, 212 days	PRP	1914; 1916	João de Sampaio Viana (PRP); João de Sampaio Viana (PRP); Álvaro Gomes Azevedo (PRP)
Álvaro Gomes Azevedo	Álvaro Gomes Azevedo (1864–1942)	15 August 1919	15 January 1920	153 days	PRP	–	Vacant
Firmiano de Morais Pinto	Firmiano de Morais Pinto (1861–1938)	15 January 1920	15 January 1926	6 years, 0 days	PRP	1919; 1922	Álvaro Gomes Azevedo (PRP); Henrique de Sousa Queirós (PRP); Luís Pereira de Queirós (PRP); Luciano Gualberto (PRP)
José Pires do Rio	José Pires do Rio (1880–1950)	15 January 1926	24 October 1930	4 years, 282 days	PRP	1925; 1928	Luciano Gualberto (PRP); Ulisses Pereira Coutinho (PRP)

== Vargas Era and Fourth Republic (1930–1953) ==
Portrait	Mayor	Took office	Left office	Time in office	Party	Appointer
José Joaquim Cardoso de Melo Neto	José Joaquim Cardoso de Melo Neto (1883–1965)	24 October 1930	6 December 1930	43 days	PD	Hastínfilo de Moura
Luís Inácio de Anhaia Melo	Luís Inácio de Anhaia Melo (1891–1974)	6 December 1930	26 July 1931	232 days	PD	João Alberto
Francisco Machado de Campos	Francisco Machado de Campos (1879–1957)	26 July 1931	15 November 1931	112 days	PD	Laudo de Camargo
Luís Inácio de Anhaia Melo	Luís Inácio de Anhaia Melo (1891–1974)	15 November 1931	5 December 1931	20 days	PD	Manuel Rabelo
Henrique Jorge Guedes	Henrique Jorge Guedes (1887–1973)	5 December 1931	24 May 1932	171 days	PRP	Manuel Rabelo
Gofredo Teles	Gofredo Teles (1888–1980)	24 May 1932	3 October 1932	132 days	PRP	Pedro Manuel de Toledo
Artur Saboia	Artur Saboia (1875–1952)	3 October 1932	29 December 1932	87 days	Independent	None
Teodoro Augusto Ramos	Teodoro Augusto Ramos (1895–1937)	29 December 1932	2 April 1933	94 days	Independent	Valdomiro Castilho de Lima
Artur Saboia	Artur Saboia (1875–1952)	2 April 1933	24 May 1933	52 days	Independent	None
Osvaldo Gomes da Costa	Osvaldo Gomes da Costa (1878–1943)	24 May 1933	31 July 1933	68 days	Independent	Valdomiro Castilho de Lima
Carlos dos Santos Gomes	Carlos dos Santos Gomes	31 July 1933	22 August 1933	22 days	Independent	Manuel Daltro Filho
Antônio Carlos de Assunção	Antônio Carlos de Assunção (1872–1952)	22 August 1933	7 September 1934	1 year, 16 days	Independent	Armando de Sales Oliveira
Fábio da Silva Prado	Fábio da Silva Prado (1887–1963)	7 September 1934	1 May 1938	3 years, 236 days	Independent	Armando de Sales Oliveira
Prestes Maia	Prestes Maia (1896–1965)	1 May 1938	11 November 1945	7 years, 194 days	Independent	Adhemar de Barros
Abraão Ribeiro	Abraão Ribeiro (1883–1957)	11 November 1945	15 March 1947	1 year, 124 days	Independent	José Macedo Soares
Cristiano Stockler das Neves	Cristiano Stockler das Neves (1889–1982)	15 March 1947	29 August 1947	167 days	PSP	Adhemar de Barros (PSP)
Paulo Lauro	Paulo Lauro (1907–1983)	29 August 1947	26 August 1948	363 days	PSP	Adhemar de Barros (PSP)
Milton Improta	Milton Improta (1910–1984)	26 August 1948	4 January 1949	131 days	Independent	None
Asdrúbal da Cunha	Asdrúbal da Cunha (1899–1971)	4 January 1949	28 February 1950	1 year, 55 days	PSP	Adhemar de Barros (PSP)
Lineu Prestes	Lineu Prestes (1896–1958)	28 February 1950	1 February 1951	338 days	PSP	Adhemar de Barros (PSP)
Armando de Arruda Pereira	Armando de Arruda Pereira (1889–1955)	1 February 1951	7 April 1953	2 years, 65 days	PSP	Lucas Nogueira Garcez (PSP)

== Fourth Republic direct elections and Military Coup (1953–1969) ==
Portrait	Mayor	Took office	Left office	Time in office	Party	Election	Vice Mayor
Jânio Quadros	Jânio Quadros (1917–1992)	7 April 1953	31 January 1955	1 year, 299 days	PDC	1953	Porfírio da Paz (PTB)
William Salem	William Salem (1921–2010)	31 January 1955	21 June 1955	141 days	PSP	–	Vacant
Juvenal Lino de Matos	Juvenal Lino de Matos (1904–1991)	21 June 1955	13 April 1956	297 days	PSP	1955	Vladimir de Toledo Piza (PTB)
Vladimir de Toledo Piza	Vladimir de Toledo Piza (1905–1999)	13 April 1956	8 April 1957	360 days	PTB	–	Vacant
Adhemar de Barros	Adhemar de Barros (1901–1969)	8 April 1957	8 April 1961	4 years, 0 days	PSP	1957	Cantídio Nogueira Sampaio (PSP)
Prestes Maia	Prestes Maia (1896–1965)	8 April 1961	8 April 1965	4 years, 0 days	UDN	1961	José Freitas Nobre (PSB)
José Vicente Faria Lima	José Vicente Faria Lima (1909–1969)	8 April 1965	8 April 1969	4 years, 0 days	ARENA	1965	Leôncio Ferraz Júnior (ARENA)

== Military Dictatorship: appointed mayors (1969–1986) ==
Portrait	Mayor	Took office	Left office	Time in office	Party	Appointer
Paulo Maluf	Paulo Maluf (born 1931)	8 April 1969	8 April 1971	2 years, 0 days	ARENA	Abreu Sodré (ARENA)
Figueiredo Ferraz	Figueiredo Ferraz (1918–1994)	8 April 1971	22 August 1973	2 years, 136 days	Independent	Laudo Natel (ARENA)
Brasil Vita	Brasil Vita (1922–2017)	22 August 1973	28 August 1973	6 days	ARENA	None
Miguel Colasuonno	Miguel Colasuonno (1939–2013)	28 August 1973	17 August 1975	1 year, 354 days	ARENA	Laudo Natel (ARENA)
Olavo Setúbal	Olavo Setúbal (1923–2008)	17 August 1975	11 July 1979	3 years, 328 days	ARENA	Paulo Egydio Martins (ARENA)
Reynaldo de Barros	Reynaldo de Barros (1931–2011)	11 July 1979	15 May 1982	2 years, 308 days	ARENA; PDS	Paulo Maluf (ARENA)
Antônio Salim Curiati	Antônio Salim Curiati (1928–2026)	15 May 1982	15 March 1983	304 days	PDS	Paulo Maluf (PDS)
Francisco Altino Lima	Francisco Altino Lima (1924–1989)	15 March 1983	10 May 1983	56 days	MDB	None
Mário Covas	Mário Covas (1930–2001)	10 May 1983	1 January 1986	2 years, 236 days	MDB	Franco Montoro (MDB)

== Sixth Republic (1986–present) ==
Portrait	Mayor	Took office	Left office	Time in office	Party	Election	Vice Mayor
Jânio Quadros	Jânio Quadros (1917–1992)	1 January 1986	1 January 1989	3 years, 0 days	PTB	1985	Arthur Alves Pinto (PFL)
Luiza Erundina	Luiza Erundina (born 1934)	1 January 1989	1 January 1993	4 years, 0 days	PT	1988	Luiz Eduardo Greenhalgh (PT)
Paulo Maluf	Paulo Maluf (born 1931)	1 January 1993	1 January 1997	4 years, 0 days	PDS; PPR; PP	1992	Sólon Borges (PTB)
Celso Pitta	Celso Pitta (1946–2009)	1 January 1997	1 January 2001	4 years, 0 days	PP; PTN	1996	Régis de Oliveira (PFL)
Marta Suplicy	Marta Suplicy (born 1945)	1 January 2001	1 January 2005	4 years, 0 days	PT	2000	Hélio Bicudo (PT)
José Serra	José Serra (born 1942)	1 January 2005	31 March 2006	1 year, 89 days	PSDB	2004	Gilberto Kassab (PFL)
Gilberto Kassab	Gilberto Kassab (born 1960)	31 March 2006	1 January 2013	6 years, 276 days	PFL; DEM; PSD	– 2008	Vacant; Alda Marco Antônio (MDB)
Fernando Haddad	Fernando Haddad (born 1963)	1 January 2013	1 January 2017	4 years, 0 days	PT	2012	Nádia Campeão (PCdoB)
João Doria	João Doria (born 1957)	1 January 2017	6 April 2018	1 year, 95 days	PSDB	2016	Bruno Covas (PSDB)
Bruno Covas	Bruno Covas (1980–2021)	6 April 2018	16 May 2021	3 years, 40 days	PSDB	– 2020	Vacant; Ricardo Nunes (MDB)
Ricardo Nunes	Ricardo Nunes (born 1967)	16 May 2021	Incumbent	5 years, 114 days	MDB	– 2024	Vacant; Mello Araújo (PL)

== See also ==
- Politics of São Paulo (in Portuguese)
- Mayors in Brazil
- List of mayors of largest cities in Brazil (in Portuguese)
- List of mayors of capitals of Brazil (in Portuguese)
