= Estado Novo (Brazil) =

Historical period of Brazil (1937–1945)

Republic of the United States of Brazil República dos Estados Unidos do Brasil
- 1937–1946
- Flag Coat of arms
- Motto: "Ordem e Progresso" "Order and Progress"
- Anthem: Hino Nacional Brasileiro (English: "Brazilian National Anthem")
- Brazil's territorial extension
- Capital: Rio de Janeiro
- Government: Federal presidential republic under an authoritarian corporatist dictatorship
- President
  - 1937–1945: Getúlio Vargas
  - 1945–1946: José Linhares
- Historical era: Vargas era • World War II
  - 1937 coup d'état: 10 November 1937
  - Entry into WWII: 22 August 1942
  - Member of UN: 24 October 1945
  - 1945 coup d'état: 29 October 1945
  - Inauguration of Gaspar Dutra: 31 January 1946

Population
  - 1940 estimate: 41,200,000
- Currency: Brazilian real (until 1942); Cruzeiro (after 1942)
Preceded by	Succeeded by
Second Brazilian Republic	Fourth Brazilian Republic

The Estado Novo (lit. 'New State'), or Third Brazilian Republic, began on 10 November 1937, and consolidated Getúlio Vargas' power. Vargas had assumed leadership of Brazil following the 1930 revolution that ended the First Republic. The Estado Novo ended politically on 29 October 1945, and officially on 31 January 1946. It was characterized by Brazilian nationalism, centralized power, anti-communism and authoritarianism.

It was part of the period known as the Vargas era that began with the Second Brazilian Republic. Vargas first took power as provisional president in 1930 following the revolution that ended the First Republic and launched the Second Brazilian Republic. Several ensuing coup attempts failed to depose him, until he granted himself new powers under the Third Brazilian Republic or Estado Novo. In early 1932, the Constitutionalist Revolution led by the Democratic Party of São Paulo, had failed due to a lack of unity within the alliance. As head of the provisional government (1930–1934), Vargas governed by decree until the Constituent Assembly of 1933–1934 adopted a new Brazilian Constitution, alongside a democratically elected legislature.

The Estado Novo period (1937–1945) began when, in order to perpetuate his rule, Vargas imposed a new, dictatorial Constitution and shut down the Legislature to rule Brazil as a dictator.

Getúlio Vargas took power on 10 November 1937, and in a radio broadcast told the nation that his regime intended to "readjust the political organism to the economic needs of the country".

The 1937 Constitution consolidated his power and allowed him to censor the press and spread propaganda coordinated by the Department of Press and Propaganda (DIP). The National Security Law made it possible to suppress Communism and prevent movements such as the Communist Uprising of 1935. Centralization of power and an import substitution policy helped to fund the industrialization of Brazil, and created institutions to carry it out such as the Companhia Siderúrgica Nacional and the Companhia Vale do Rio Doce.

The Estado Novo is considered a precursor to the military dictatorship in Brazil that began with the 1964 coup, although the two regimes differed on several levels.

== History ==
=== Background ===
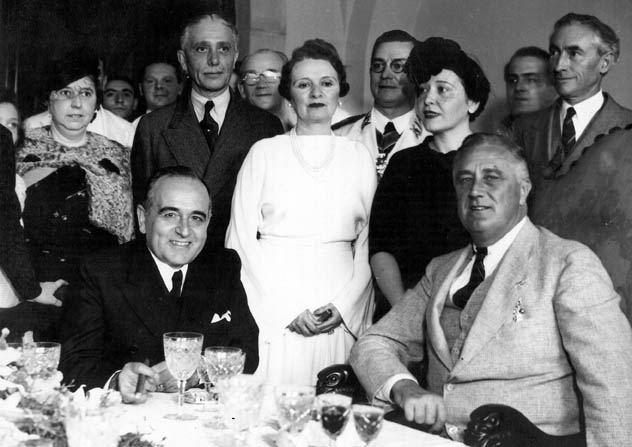
Getúlio Vargas and Franklin Roosevelt meeting in Rio de Janeiro in 1936.

José Américo de Almeida and Armando de Sales Oliveira, who supported the Revolution of 1930, were running for presidency in the 1937 Brazilian elections, as well as the fascist-aligned integralist Plínio Salgado. The Vargas government, on 30 September 1937, made public an alleged communist plan aiming to seize the central government, later dubbed the Cohen Plan. The National Congress declared martial law the next day, 1 October.

The integralists (right wing) denied participation, however, and blamed General Góis Monteiro, then head of the Army General Staff. Captain Olímpio Mourão Filho, an integralist, was accused but acquitted eighteen years later by the Brazilian Army's Council of Justification (requested on 26 December 1956). He later initiated the 1964 coup d'état.

On 19 October, Rio Grande do Sul governor José Flores da Cunha lost control of the state's Military Brigade, which Vargas had subordinated to the Brazilian Army. Surrounded by General Góis Monteiro's men, Flores da Cunha left office and went into exile in Uruguay. He had bought a large quantity of arms into Europe and been the last possible military resistance to the Vargas coup attempt. Armando de Sales might have opposed the coup, but he had already left his position in the São Paulo government to run for presidency in the 1937 election. His successor, José de Melo Neto, promised Vargas that "São Paulo would not have another revolution".

Just as in 1930, São Paulo was divided; the Constitutionalist Party of Armando Sales, heir to the Democratic Party, and the Republican Party of São Paulo (PRP), were unable to cooperate because the PRP had not agreed to support Armando Sales' candidacy.

=== 1937 coup d'état ===
On 10 November 1937, Vargas took office through a coup, stating on the radio that the regime intended to "readjust the political organism to the economic needs of the country". Vargas also stated that "when political disputes threaten to degenerate into civil war, it is a sign that the constitutional regime has lost its practical value, existing only as an abstraction".

He promulgated a new constitution the same day that gave him absolute control of the country and the power to appoint federal intervenors (interventores) with autonomy to replace the states' governors. All governors had already been replaced after Vargas assumed power following the 1930 revolution, with the exception of Minas Gerais, whose governor, Olegário Maciel, was kept in office. Vargas had also appointed tenentist revolutionary leaders for the other states, such as Flores da Cunha in Rio Grande do Sul, Carlos de Lima Cavalcanti in Pernambuco, and João Alberto Lins de Barros in São Paulo.

=== Consolidation ===
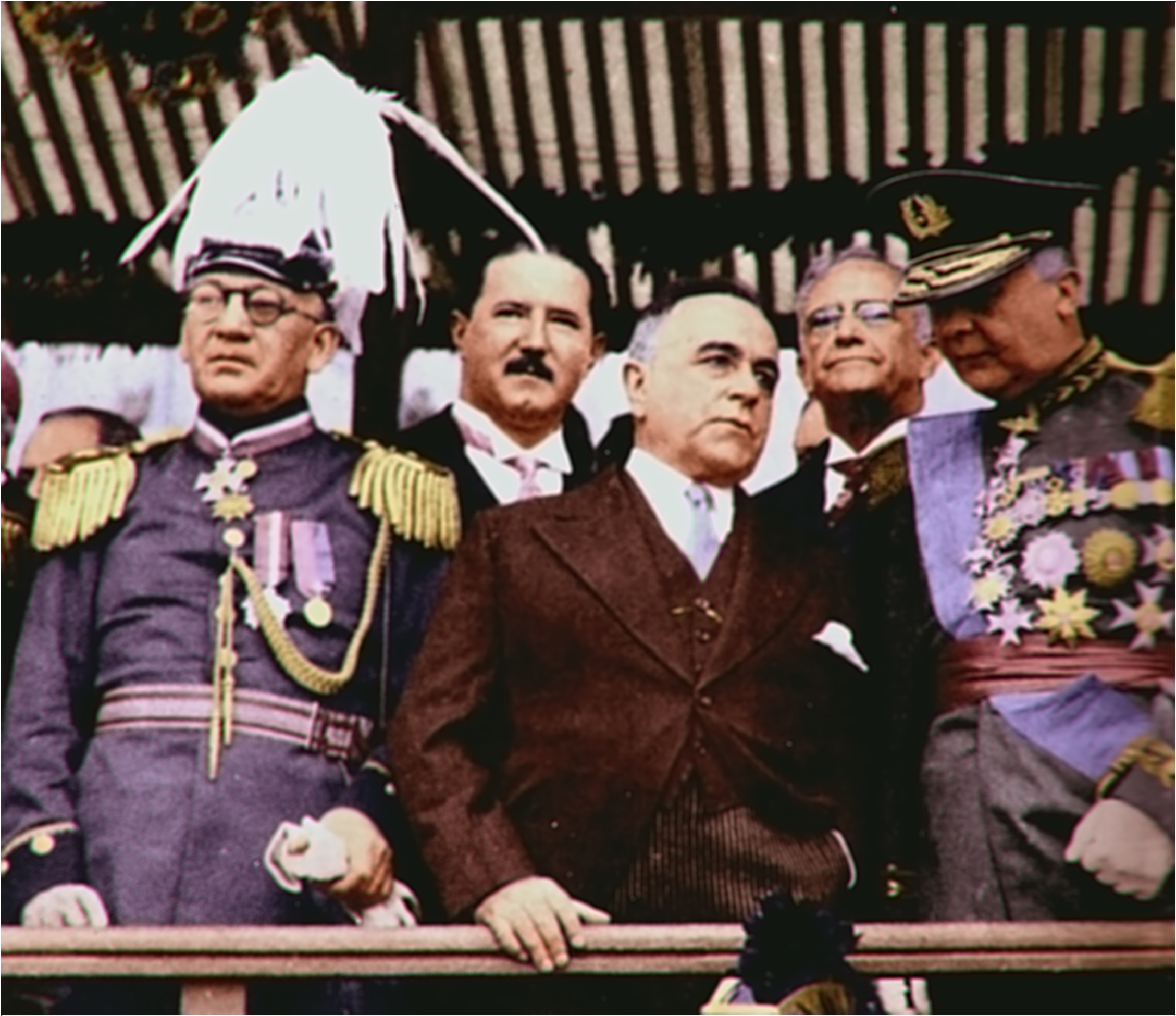
15 November 1939: 50th anniversary of the Proclamation of the Republic

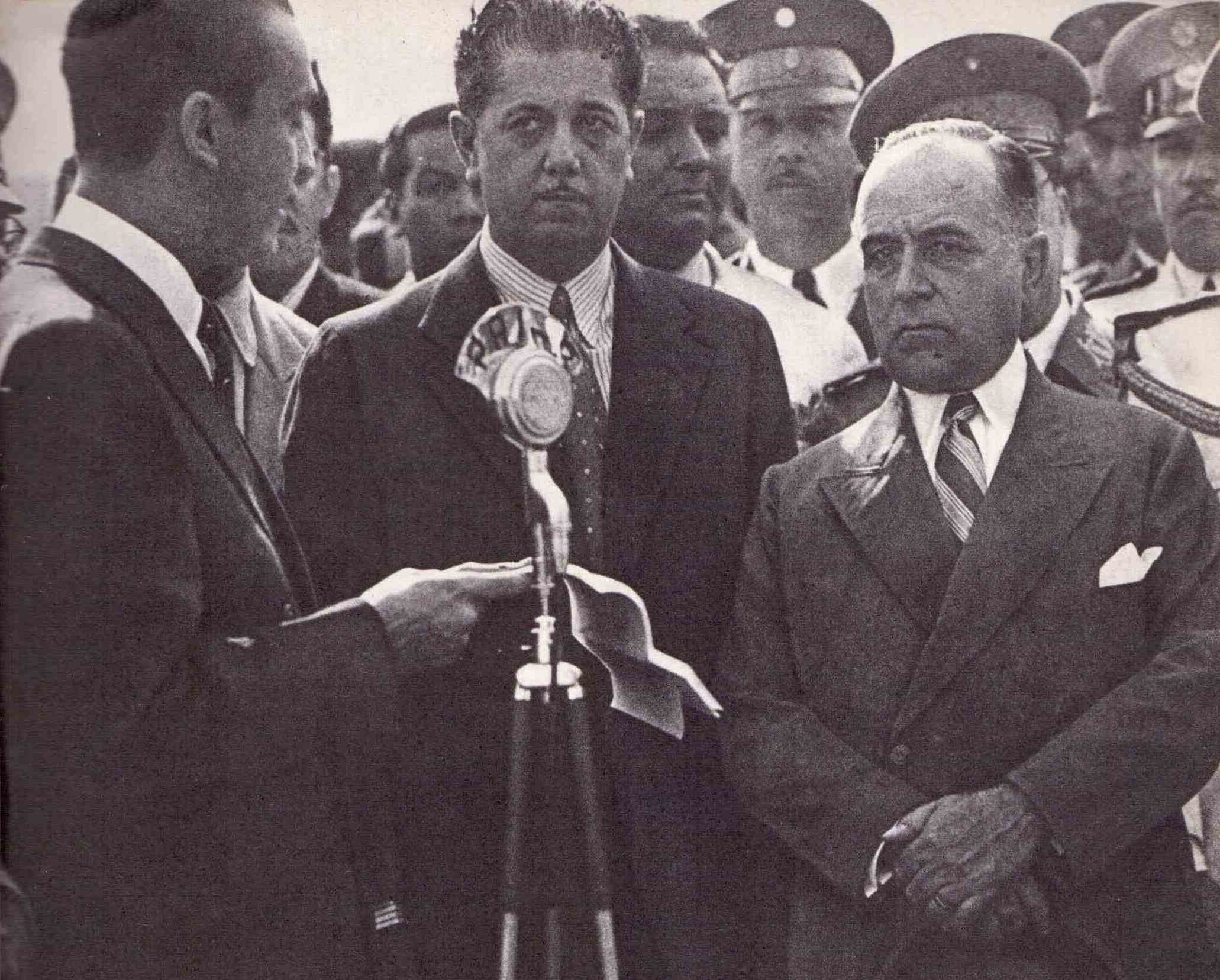
Vargas on 12 May 1940 at the inauguration of Avenida do Contorno with Benedito Valadares, governor of Minas Gerais, and then-mayor of Belo Horizonte Juscelino Kubitschek

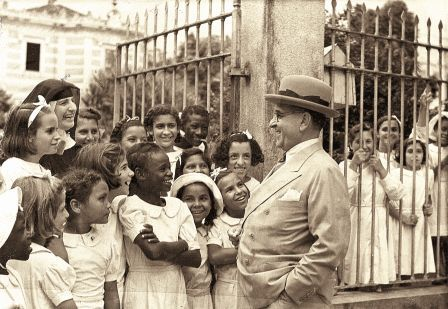
Vargas visiting Porto Velho in 1940

The 1937 constitution, entirely drafted by Francisco Campos, became known as "Polaca" (Portuguese demonym for the Polish), because it was inspired by the April Constitution of Poland. It shut down the Congress, state and municipal legislatures, and abolished universal suffrage. The constitution also provided for a new legislature and a plebiscite, which did not take place. No elections were held in the Estado Novo period, although the judiciary did preserve its autonomy. The preamble of the constitution explained the establishment of the dictatorship by describing pre-civil war Brazil.

Decree-Law No. 37 of 2 December 1937 abolished political parties, including two that were critical of the then-political system, and preached "direct contact with the masses":

Considering that the electoral system then in force...encouraged the proliferation of parties, with the sole and exclusive aim of giving candidacies and elective positions the appearance of legitimacy, and:...the new regime... must be in direct contact with the people, overriding partisan struggles of any kind, independent of the consultation of groupings, parties or organizations, ostensibly or disguisedly aimed at conquering public power.

Vargas opposed political parties and one-party models:

We must have no illusions. Given our customs and the low level of our political culture, addicted to oligarchic and personalist practices, this single party will soon begin to subdivide into factions and needlessly agitate and disrupt the life of the country.

What was urgent, he said, was "to speed up the process of our development and strengthen the creative energies of progress." The issue of a single-party system then "closed for good".

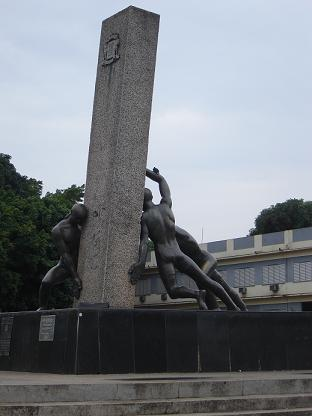
The inauguration of Goiânia in 1942 was the start of a "march to the west" that culminated with the construction of Brasília many years later.

The Estado Novo also opposed regionalism. Flags of the federal states, which were forbidden to bear any symbols, were burned on 4 December in a civic ceremony on the Russel Esplanade in Rio de Janeiro."We no longer have regional problems," Getúlio had said in 1939, "they are all national, and of interest to the whole of Brazil".

The government censored the press through the Department of Press and Propaganda (DIP), created by Decree-Law No. 1,915 of 27 December 1939. Vargas said in a speech to the Federal Senate on 13 December 1946 regarding the creation of the DIP:

...I shouldn't solve our problems according to the convenience of international propaganda, but on the basis of the convenience of Brazil and America... The excessive diligence of British propaganda repeatedly disrupted my actions. But to a certain extent it was useful, because it led to measures that guaranteed our impeccable neutrality (in the early years of the World War II).

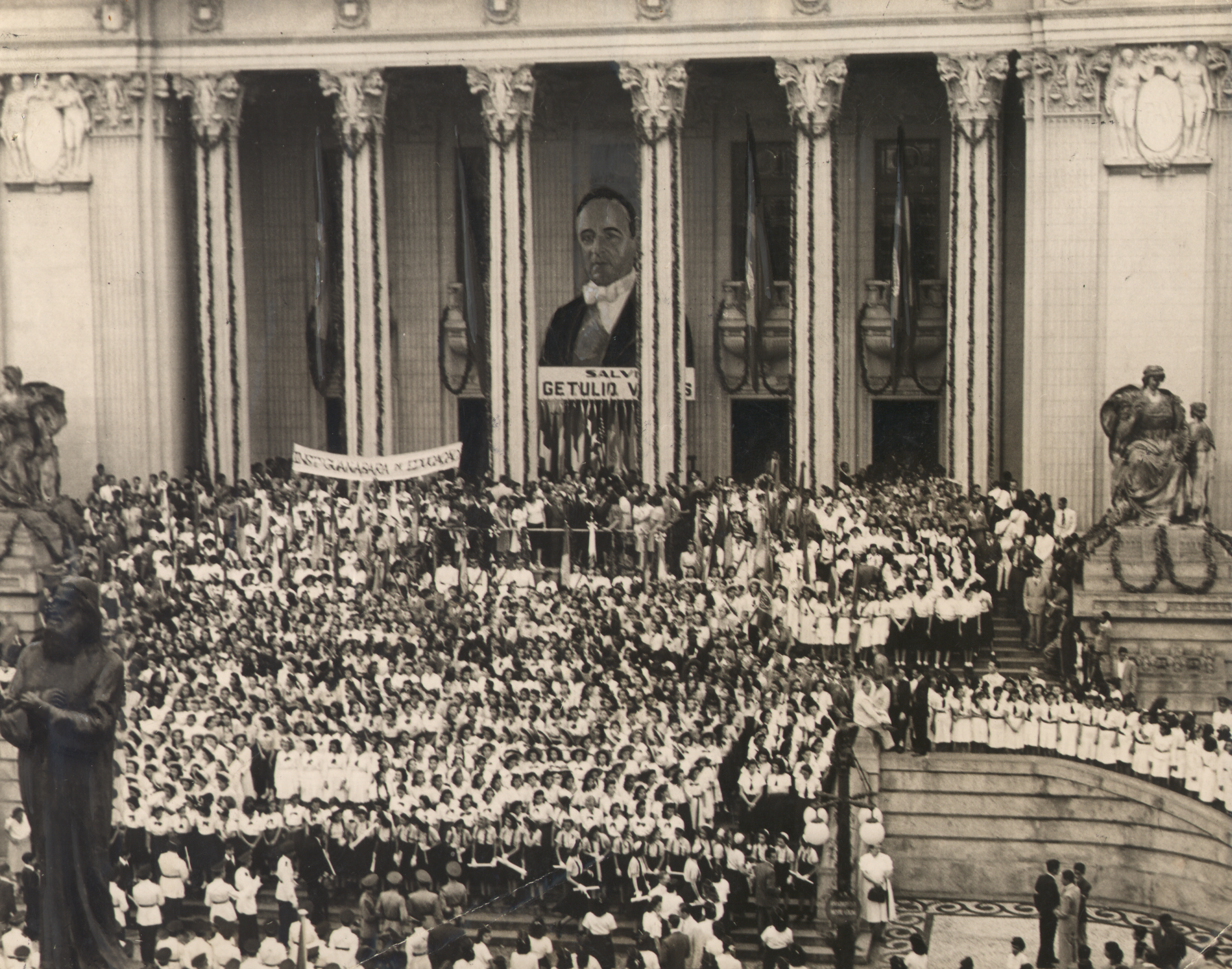
Demonstration in support of Getúlio Vargas before the Chamber of Deputies, 19 April 1942. National Archives

Vargas' cabinet was relatively stable. His ministers of Finance, War, the Navy and Education remained in office throughout the period. The Integralist Uprising on 8 May 1938, which attacked the Guanabara Palace, attempting to depose Vargas, was the only response to the coup. It led him to appoint a personal guard, which the people called the "Black Guard".

Vargas said in a Revista do Globo interview that the 1938 Integralist coup attempt: "...was organized by the German embassy. The Brazilians served only as instruments in a plan to hand the country over to the German government. Naturally, if it hadn't been for the help of German agents, they would never have carried it out, because they didn't have the capacity or the courage to do so."

=== Political repression and torture ===
The preamble to the 1937 Constitution stated that the Estado Novo was installed to meet "the legitimate aspirations of the Brazilian people for political and social peace, deeply disturbed by notorious factors of disorder... tending, by their natural development, to resolve themselves in terms of violence, placing the nation under the ominous imminence of civil war due to communist infiltration..."

The Estado Novo rigorously repressed communism, backed by the National Security Law, which prevented revolutionary movements such as the Communist uprising of 1935. However, Brazil had no federal police force, and state police forces remained under the command of the federal intervenors. The Brazilian Civil Code of 1916 remained in force, and a new, more liberal penal code was adopted.

Torture at the Rio de Janeiro Police headquarters in Filinto Müller's administration was reported. and some critics of the Estado Novo claim that torture occurred throughout Brazil.

On 3 October 1931, Vargas said that due to his changes to the Civil Police of the Federal District in his first year in office, the Civil Police of the Federal District "Under the revolutionary government, the Civil Police of the Federal District redeemed itself in the eyes of public opinion; it was, in fact, one of the departments that had fallen the lowest in the country's general opinion. This department had long since ceased to be an apparatus of order, but had been transformed into a terrorist organization, whose fame had already spread, with the prestige of sinister things, beyond our borders." These reforms followed the suggestions of the Civil Police Reform Commission of the Federal District under Police Chief João Batista Luzardo.

Decree-Law No. 5,504 of May 20, 1943 created the Federal District Police Inspectorate to supervise the Civil Police of the Federal District. The bad reputation of Civil Police of Rio de Janeiro dated back to the Old Republic, and was mocked in the first samba recorded in Brazil, Pelo Telefone, by Donga in 1917: "Over the phone, the Chief of Police tells me that in Carioca there's a roulette wheel to play".

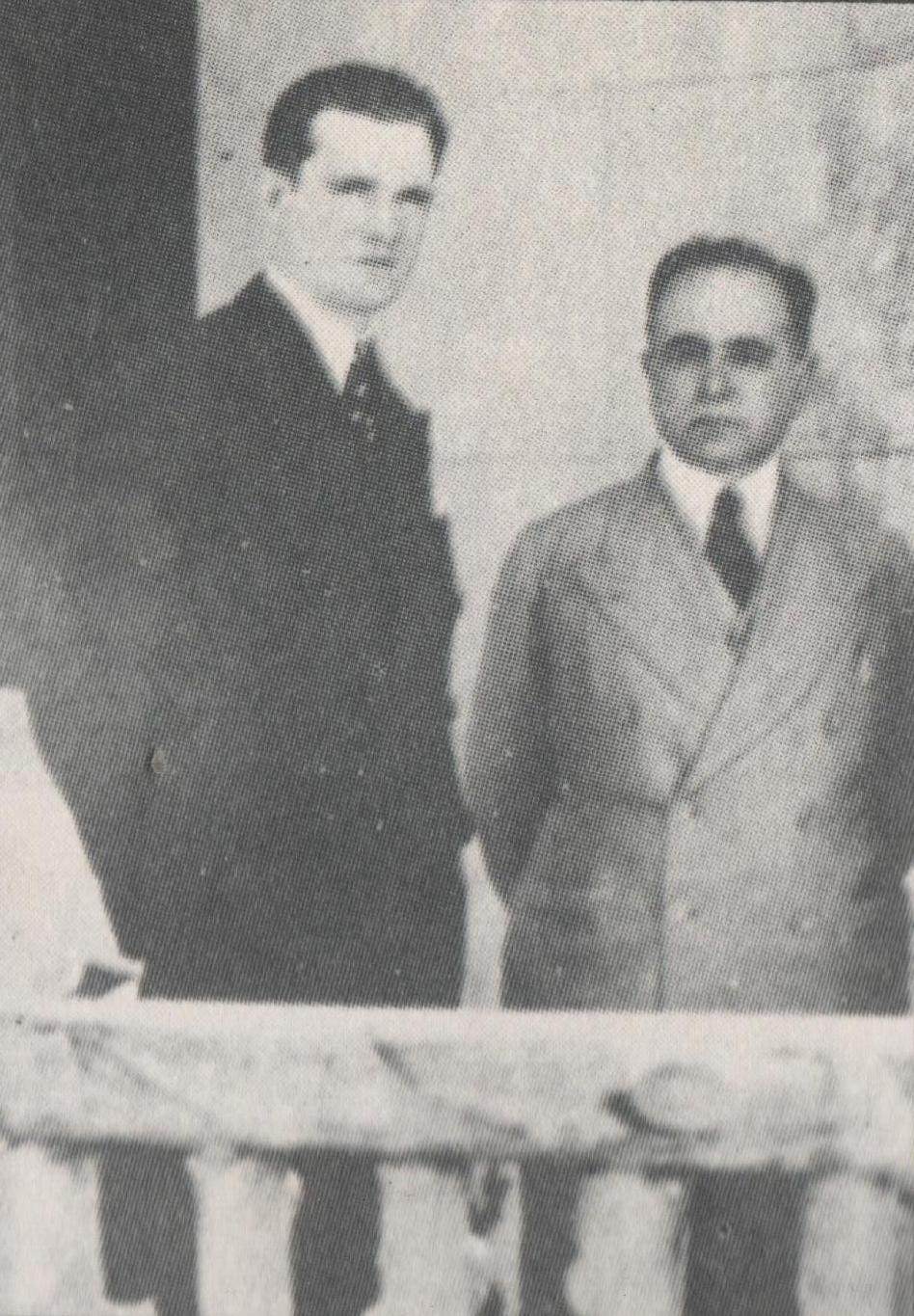
Vargas with future general and president of Brazil Ernesto Geisel (Recife, 1940).

Several autobiographies reported imprisonment and torture, without claiming Vargas' direct involvement, examples being Pagu, Carlos Marighella, and Joaquim Câmara Ferreira, who lost his fingernails in prison. Several artists did directly accuse Vargas of restricting individual rights, and he replied on 23 July 1938: "The Estado Novo does not recognize the rights of individuals against the community. Individuals don't have rights, they have duties! Rights belong to the community! The state, overriding the struggle of interests, guarantees the rights of the community and enforces its duties towards it."

"The Vargas regime's relentless persecution of its opponents (real and imagined), whose methods heavily involved the use of torture, violence, deportation and murder," said UOL, was just one of the facets, perhaps the best known, of this period."

Lawyer Marina Pasquini Toffolli has called the Estado Nova "a dictatorship that spread terror and built barbarism throughout its territory, suppressing all individual guarantees" and noted the dismissal of the federal, state and municipal parliaments, censorship of the press and repression. The first civilian to examine the secret police archives in Rio de Janeiro, American researcher R.S.Rose, collected material in his book One of the Forgotten Things: Getúlio Vargas and Brazilian social control – 1930–1954, published in 2001 by Companhia das Letras. Rose saw the Estado Novo as an unpopular regime that needed to "coerce the people" to survive:

"During Vargas' rule, the quality and quantity of human rights abuses reached unprecedented levels. Violence, as a means of coercing the people, was evident in all sectors of the security apparatus... The nation's police forces redefined and in some cases reinvented the torture that had already taken place in Brazil since colonial times. The cruelty of their methods was matched only by the fervor with which this example was followed by subsequent generations."

However, an October 1954 special edition of the magazine O Mundo Ilustrado said that Vargas enjoyed his greatest popularity in the dictatorial period: "The popular prestige of President Vargas grew even more after the proclamation of the Estado Novo. Never before has a head of state been so loved by his people in our country. His prestige never waned, and Vargas remained beloved until his tragic death."

Journalist David Nasser lists some of the more common forms of torture in his Falta Alguém em Nuremberg: Torturas da Polícia de Felinto Strubling Müller. and the 1952 novel The Bowels of Liberty by Jorge Amado, who went into exile in 1948, relate "details of the repression of the Brazilian Communist Party, censorship, torture and imprisonment" under the Estado Novo, He was arrested in 1936 and 1937 for subversion based on his involvement with the Communist Uprising. In 1937, his books were burned in a public square in Salvador. In his book Tancredo Fala de Getúlio, on the other hand, Tancredo Neves, Minister of Justice from 1953 to 1954, wrote that: "He tried hard to project himself in history as a unique dictator, because he was a progressive dictator, a humanitarian dictator. Despite one or two accusations of violence, the people don't accept Getúlio as a violent dictator".

=== World War II ===
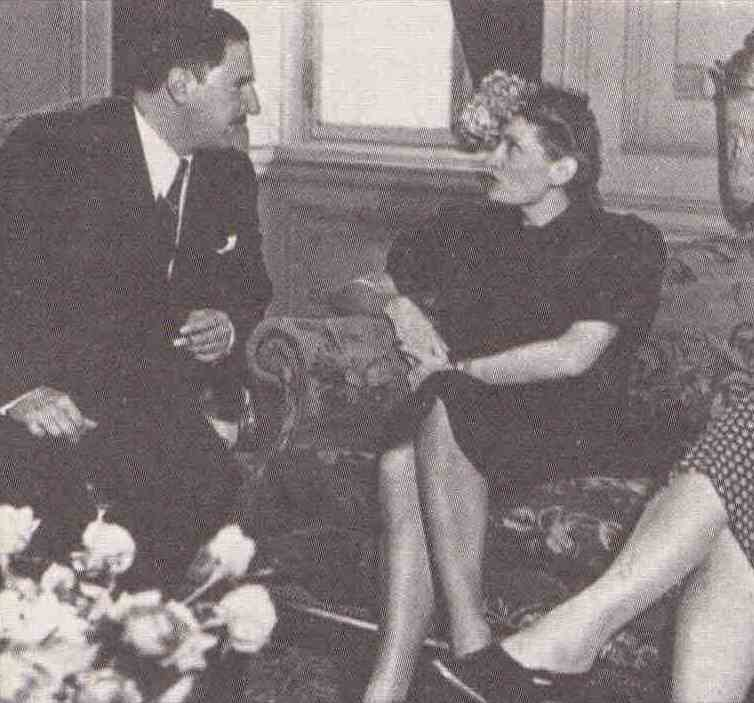
Edda Mussolini, daughter of Benito Mussolini, is greeted by Adhemar de Barros during her visit to São Paulo in 1939.

Vargas and the military maintained a neutral stance from September 1939 to 1941. Public opinion was divided. Many immigrants from the Axis powers sympathized with those countries but the majority of Afro-descendants and communists, especially after the June 1941 invasion of the USSR (aligned with the Allies), and had great mobilization power and influence in the press. During this period, Vargas wrote in his diary: "It seems to me that the Americans want to drag us into the war, without it being of any use to us or to them!"

At the January 1942 Pan-American Conference in Rio de Janeiro, most countries on the continent condemned the attack on Pearl Harbor on 7 December 1941, and broke off diplomatic relations with the Axis countries on 21 January 1942. Nazi espionage in Brazil was active during the war, both as networks and individual actions.

The United States created Plan Rubber to invade the northeastern region of Brazil if Vargas did not agree to airbases, which would compromise the country's neutrality. However, the plan was necessary because, with or without Vargas' knowledge, the Brazilian military had since 1934 already reached a "cautious alignment" with the US in the event of another world conflict. Furthermore, the planned blockade by the British navy on Germany and Italy made large-scale trade with them impossible.

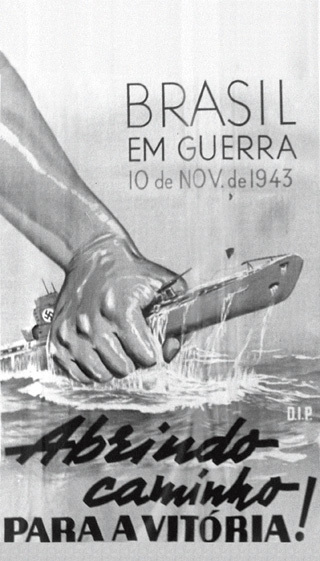
Brazilian propaganda poster announcing the declaration of war on the Axis powers on 10 November 1943. The caption reads: "Brazil at war...Opening the road to victory!"

After extensive negotiation, Brazil and the United States signed an agreement in which the US committed to finance the construction of a large Brazilian steel plant (Companhia Siderúrgica Nacional) in Volta Redonda, Rio de Janeiro, in exchange for permission to set up military bases and airports in the north and northeast of the country. The German navy extended submarine warfare to Brazilian-flagged merchant ships, and the Italian navy followed suit. However, Vargas did not declare war until 22 August, seven months after the attacks.

The Allies needed rubber because the Japanese occupation of Southeast Asia meant they could no longer depend on a supply from that region. This resulted in a large migration of northeastern Brazilians to the Amazon rainforest, in order to fulfill the latex demand. This revived the area's economy, which had stagnated since the end of the first rubber cycle decades earlier.

On 28 January 1943, Vargas and US President Franklin D. Roosevelt agreed at the Natal Conference, to create the Brazilian Expeditionary Force (FEB) in August, a year after the declaration of war. The pracinhas, as FEB soldiers became known, were 25,000 in 1945, of an estimated 200,000. They fought in Italy in July 1944, and served from September to the end of the European conflict on 8 May 1945. The US and the UK invited Brazil to join the occupation of Austria, but Brazil refused.

=== Decline ===
Among the FEB soldiers were eight law students from the University of São Paulo, who took part in peaceful demonstrations against Vargas such as the Silent March in which they paraded with black gags to symbolize the lack of freedom of expression. "We were called up as a punishment – as if it could be a punishment to serve Brazil!" wrote one student, Geraldo Vidigal. The role of these students in the war was to disarm landmines before the tanks got through.

Vargas expressed concern about the future of the Estado Novo in his diary on 27 January 1942:

I have to confess that I feel sad. A large part of those who applaud this attitude (breaking diplomatic relations with Germany), a few who even slander me, are opponents of the regime I founded (the Estado Novo), and I even doubt that I will be able to consolidate it in order to pass the government on to my replacement.

On 24 October 1943, the first organized protest against the Estado Novo occurred in Minas Gerais, a letter called Manifesto dos Mineiros signed by the state's elite, including many influential political leaders, such as Pedro Aleixo, Afonso Arinos de Melo Franco, Mendes Pimentel, Bueno Brandão and José de Magalhães Pinto. 50 thousand copies were clandestinely printed and distributed. The government reacted and many of the manifeto's signatories were removed from their public offices or fired from their jobs due to government pressure.

An opponent of the Estado Novo, writer Monteiro Lobato, was imprisoned after accusing Vargas of not allowing Brazilians to search for oil. As World War II ended in 1945, pressures grew for redemocratization. José Américo de Almeida's interview with Carlos Lacerda on 22 February 1945, published in Rio de Janeiro's Correio da Manhã, symbolized the end of press censorship under the Estado Novo and the weakening and fall of the regime.

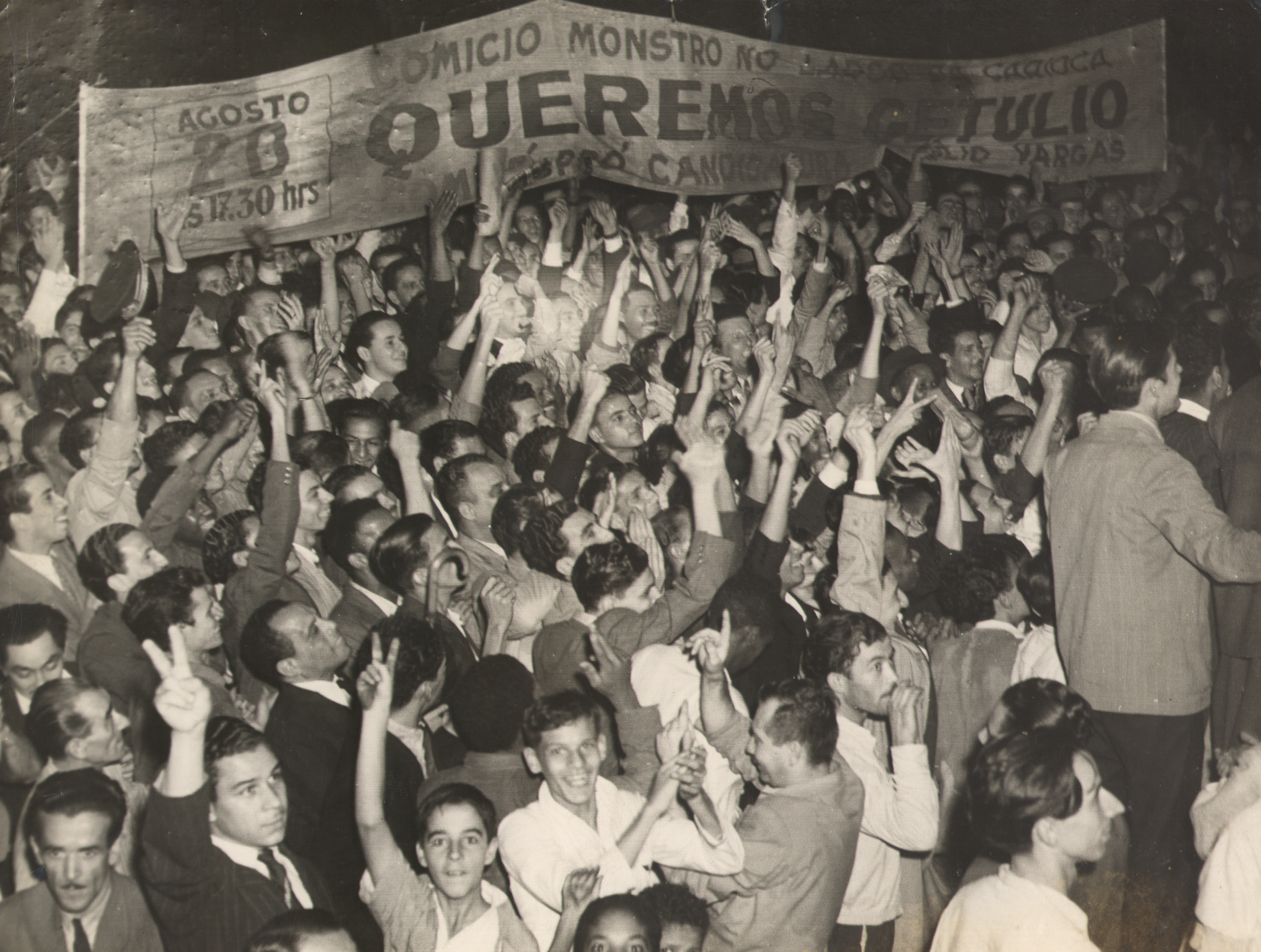
Demonstration in favor of Getúlio Vargas at the end of the Estado Novo, on 21 August 1945. National Archives

Despite measures like setting a date for presidential elections on 28 May 1945 (2 December), amnesty for Luís Carlos Prestes and other political prisoners, freedom of party organization and a commitment to elect a new Constituent Assembly, pressure for Getúlio to resign remained strong.

Led by businessman Hugo Borghi, a movement nicknamed Queremismo emerged in support of Vargas until a new constitution was promulgated, which never happened.

Vargas was deposed on 29 October 1945 by a military movement led by generals from his own ministry. He formally resigned as president of the republic and was replaced by the president of the Federal Supreme Court, José Linhares, since there was no vice-president in the 1937 Constitution. The trigger for the military action was the appointment of Getúlio's brother, Benjamim Vargas, as chief of police in Rio de Janeiro.

=== José Linhares' term ===
Linhares stayed in office for three months before handing over power to president-elect Eurico Gaspar Dutra. A valuable contribution to Eurico Dutra's electoral victory came from Hugo Borghi, who distributed thousands of pamphlets accusing candidate Eduardo Gomes of saying: "I don't need the votes of the marmiteiros". In fact, what Eduardo said, at the Municipal Theater in Rio de Janeiro on 19 November, was: "I don't need the votes of these unemployed people who support the dictator to elect me president of the Republic".

Linhares prepared the country for the return of the democratic order, replacing the stakeholders in the states by judiciary members, giving the new parliament constitution-making powers, extinguishing the Court of National Security, abolishing the state of emergency, provided in the 1937 Constitution, among other measures. Besides such transition measures, he sought to fight inflation and revoked anti-trust legislation (which were key on deposing Vargas). In December 1945, elections were held for the presidency and the National Constituent Assembly.

== Economy and infrastructure ==
During the Estado Novo, the National Petroleum Council and the Administrative Department of Public Service were created by Decree-Law No. 579 of 30 July 1938, with the objective of reorganizing public administration, which was abolished by Decree No. 93,211 of 3 September 1986. In his speech inaugurating the works of the Companhia Siderúrgica Nacional (CSN), Getúlio described this operation as a game-changer for the Brazilian economy and said: "The basic problem of our economy will soon be under a new sign. The semi-colonial, agrarian country, importer of manufactures and exporter of raw materials, will be able to shoulder the responsibilities of an autonomous industrial life, providing for its urgent defense and equipment needs."

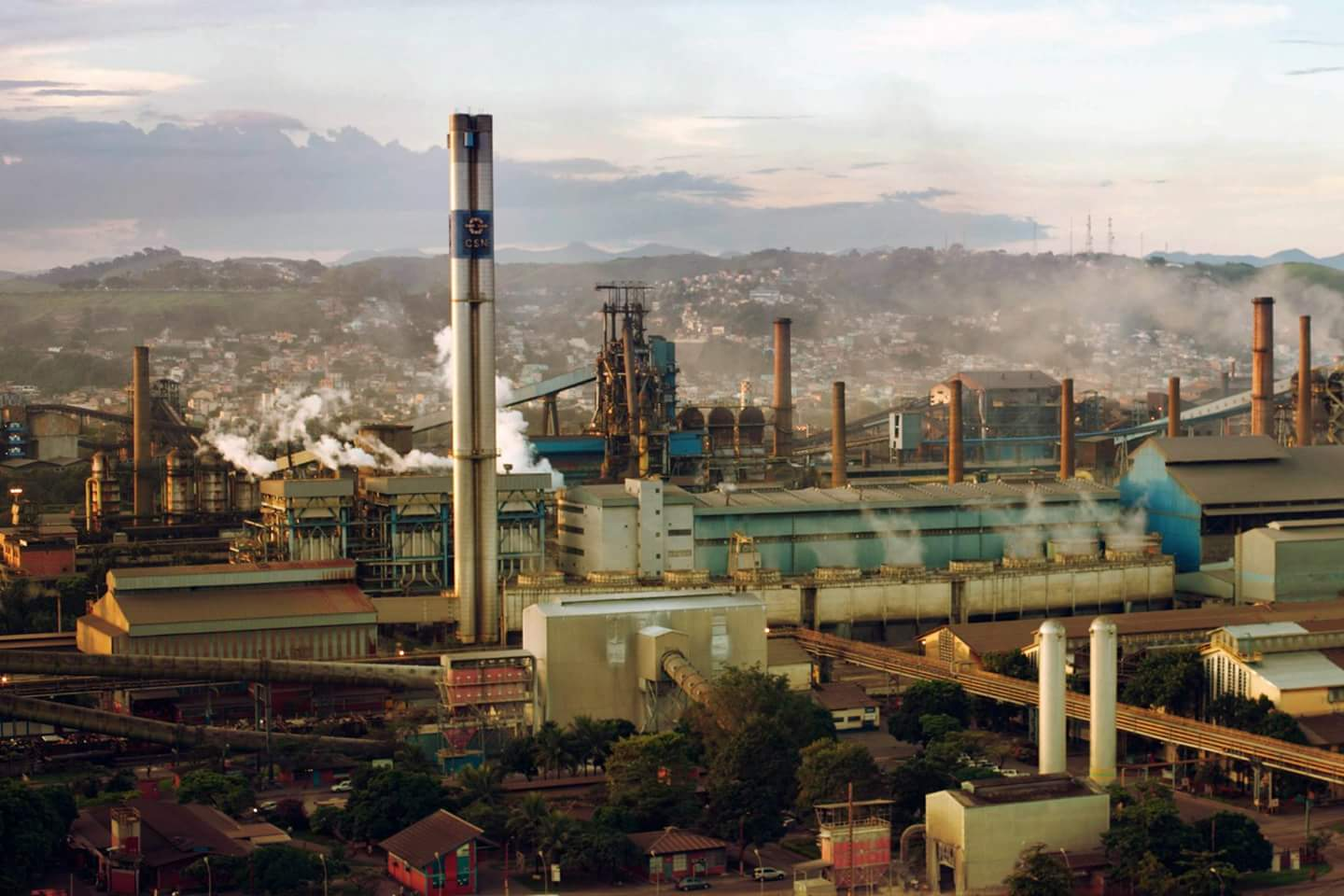
Partial view of CSN in Volta Redonda.

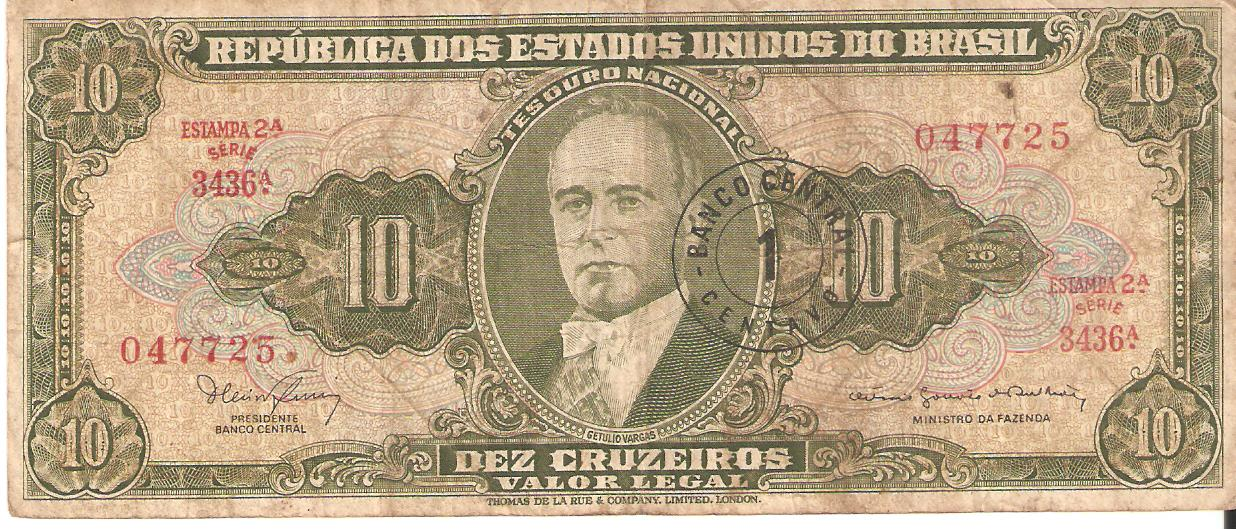
Effigy on the ten cruzeiros banknote in 1942.

Vargas created the Companhia Nacional de Álcalis via Decree-Law No. 5.684 of 20 July 1943; the Companhia Vale do Rio Doce via Decree-Law No. 4.352 of 1 June 1942; and the Instituto de Resseguros do Brasil via Decree-Law No. 1. 186, of 3 April 1939. The São Francisco's Hydroelectric Company, the Federal Council for Foreign Trade, the law on joint-stock companies and the Estrada de Ferro Central do Brasil were reorganized as autarchies and their functions expanded, through Decree-Law No. 306 of 24 May 1941.

Getúlio was a pioneer of the Brazilian aeronautical industry, creating the Fábrica Nacional de Motores (FNM), initially planned to be an aircraft factory, but later producing tractors and the FNM truck. Since 1933, he had also been personally involved in creating the Lagoa Santa Airplane Factory, in Minas Gerais, which faced difficulties due to the World War II and technical issues. It produced a few units of the T-6 aircraft and was closed in 1951.

The Companhia Siderúrgica Nacional was created by Vargas after a diplomatic agreement, called the Washington Accords, between the Brazilian and US governments, which planned to build a steel mill that could supply the Allies with steel during the World War II. The agreements also established mutual cooperation with the United Kingdom in the war effort, with Brazil receiving loans and expanding exports of minerals and rubber. Decree-Law No. 4,523 of 25 July 1942, created the Commission for the Control of the Washington Agreements.

The modernization of the armed forces included the creation of the Ministry of Aeronautics and the FAB, the construction of a new army headquarters, new barracks and military villages, the new military school in Resende (AMAN), the development of arms factories to reduce external dependence and new laws on the organization of the army, promotions, education, pension funds and the Code of Military Justice. The army of the time had eugenic criteria for selecting those who would do compulsory military service.

The National Gasogen Commission encouraged the use of gasogen equipment to produce lean gas, which fueled Brazilian cars during the World War II, when imports of oil and derivatives were restricted. A new currency was created, the cruzeiro, which had been planned when Getúlio was Washington Luís' finance minister. Decree-Law of 14 September 25, 1937, created the Technical Council of Economy and Finance (CTEF) which, according to the newspaper Valor Econômico, was the "result of an exercise to supervise the country's financial conditions, carried out since the beginning of Getúlio Vargas' government".

Decree-Law No. 395 of 29 April 1938, declared the national oil supply a public utility, granted the federal government exclusive competence to regulate the oil industry and created the National Petroleum Council. In 1939, in Lobato, Bahia, oil was extracted for the first time in Brazil. Decree-Law No. 311 of 2 March 1938, established rules on the territorial division of the country and, in Article 3, established that all municipal seats would have the category of cities.

The Rio-Bahia highway, the first road link between central-southern and northeastern Brazil, was built. It extended as far as Feira de Santana and, from this city to Fortaleza, Getúlio constructed the Transnordestina Highway, now BR-116. About this road, Getúlio declared in the 1950 presidential campaign:

In the first ten years following the 1930 Revolution, the road network in the Northeast almost doubled in length. The main routes linking the state capitals and the largest cities were almost all completed during my government. At the beginning of 1945, 1,234 kilometers of the great Transnordestina highway, which connects Fortaleza to Salvador and crosses the richest economic regions of Ceará, Pernambuco and the north of Bahia, were handed over to traffic.

These roads greatly increased the migration of northeasterners to the center-south of Brazil, most of them coming in trucks nicknamed "paus-de-arara"; before their existence, journeys to the north were mainly made on ships called "itas". About the reservoirs Vargas built in the Northeast of Brazil, at a rally in Fortaleza on 12 January 1947, he said: "For almost half a century (from 1877 to 1930) only 650 million cubic meters of water were dammed to fight the drought. In 14 years, my government dammed almost three billion cubic meters of water and left works ready for another four billion cubic meters. In just over a decade, 10 times more than in half a century."

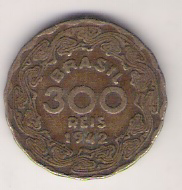
In 1942, the réis (R$) stopped circulating and gave way to the cruzeiro (Cr$).

The occupation of the Amazon by Brazilians from other regions, especially the Northeast, was stimulated by the extraction of rubber for export to the United States, which had lost its supply from Southeast Asia as a result of World War II. These migrants, who became known as the "Rubber Soldiers", were inscribed in the Book of National Heroes by Law No. 12,447 of 15 July 2011.

In 1944, Brazil took part in the Bretton Woods Conference, which resulted in the creation of the IMF and the World Bank. Decree-law 6.378, of 28 March 1944, transformed the Civil Police of Rio de Janeiro into the Federal Department of Public Security (DFSP), that in 1964 began to operate nationwide and in 1967 was renamed the Federal Police. Decree-Law 7.293 of 2 February 1945, created the Superintendence of Currency and Credit (SUMOC), stating in Article 1: "The Superintendence of Currency and Credit is created, directly subordinated to the Minister of Finance, with the immediate objective of exercising control over the monetary market and preparing the organization of the Central Bank." SUMOC exercised this function of currency control until the creation of the Central Bank of Brazil in 1964.

== Politics ==
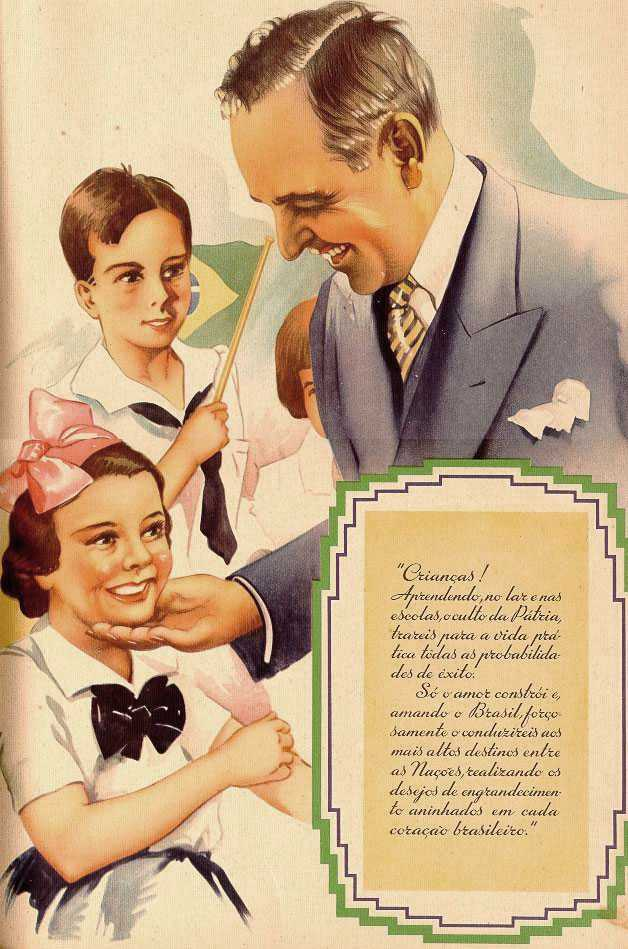
Propaganda for the Estado Novo showing Getúlio Vargas next to children, symbols of Brazil's future.

Vargas dissolved the National Congress and abolished political parties, and implemented a new constitution giving him total control of the executive power and allowing him to appoint intervenors in the states, to whom Getúlio gave wide autonomy. It provided for a new legislature, but elections were not held in the Estado Novo.

Vargas ruled by decree and never called for a plebiscite. It replaced the 1934 Constitution, which Vargas disliked. On the 10th anniversary of the 1930 revolution, in a speech on 11 November 1940, he commented:

A hasty constitutionalization, out of time, presented as a solution to all ills, resulted in a political organization tailored to personal influences and factional partisanship, divorced from existing realities. It repeated the mistakes of the 1891 Constitution and aggravated them with provisions of pure legal invention, some retrograde and others nodding to exotic ideologies.

Francisco Campos, who drafted the document, thought that Vargas' mistake was in not installing the legislative branch and legitimizing himself by plebiscite. Francisco Campos said he started drafting the new constitution in 1936, so the decision to carry out a coup d'état may have been taken shortly after the Communist Uprising, in November 1935.

The Estado Novo promoted large patriotic, civic and nationalist demonstrations, encouraged by the Department of Press and Propaganda (DIP). The judiciary was not significantly interfered with during the Estado Novo.

Communist leader Luís Carlos Prestes remained imprisoned throughout the Estado Novo; due to his relationship with the Comintern, he defended the continuation of Getúlio Vargas' government during his speech at the São Januário Stadium in Rio de Janeiro in 1945, based on the progress achieved during his administration. The writer Monteiro Lobato was arrested for sending a letter to Getúlio criticizing his policy on Brazilian oil: he wanted the government to exploit this natural resource for the country's development.

However, the Estado Novo was dependent on foreign investment in research. Faced with this situation, Getúlio Vargas created the National Petroleum Council (CNP) and Petrobras.

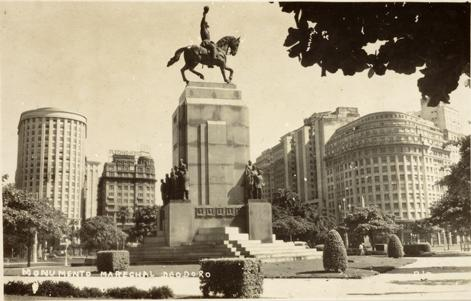
A monument-tomb to Marshal Deodoro, the proclaimer of the Republic in Brazil, inaugurated in Paris Square in Rio de Janeiro in 1937. It was important to exalt republican symbols in order to strengthen the government of Getulio Vargas.

During the regime, both militants from the National Liberation Alliance (ANL), a progressive and anti-fascist political group, and members of the Brazilian Integralist Action (AIB), a group inspired by Italian Fascism, were imprisoned. Important intellectuals were also arrested, such as writer Graciliano Ramos and journalist Barão de Itararé; some were not even oppositionists, but were victims of hateful accusations. The book Memórias do Cárcere by Ramos relates his experiences when he was imprisoned on Ilha Grande, accused of having links with the Communist Party (PCB).

The press was censored. The morning newspaper O Estado de S. Paulo, which had a liberal ideology and supported the 1930 Revolution, was taken over from the Mesquita family by Adhemar Pereira de Barros. The newspaper's owner, Júlio de Mesquita Filho, went into exile in Argentina, and until today the journal does not count the years under Getulio's intervention in its official history; the company was returned to the Mesquitas in 1945. The nationalization campaign was also launched to integrate immigrants and their culture into the national reality, reducing their influence and seeking their integration into the Brazilian population. During this period, teaching in a foreign language, which was very common in places of German colonization, was banned, and even the name of the Palestra Itália soccer club had to be replaced by Palmeiras.

Decree-Law No. 483 of 8 June 1938, created the Brazilian Air Code to regulate air transport, which was in force until 1966, when it was replaced by another law of the same name. Brazil's first comprehensive code on narcotics was created via Decree-Law No. 891 of 25 November 1938. There was a grammar reform in 1943, which simplified the spelling of the Portuguese language, based on Decree-Law No. 292 of 23 February 1938. The Imperial Museum was created in Petrópolis through Decree-Law No. 2,096 of 20 March 1940.

=== Socio-cultural policy ===
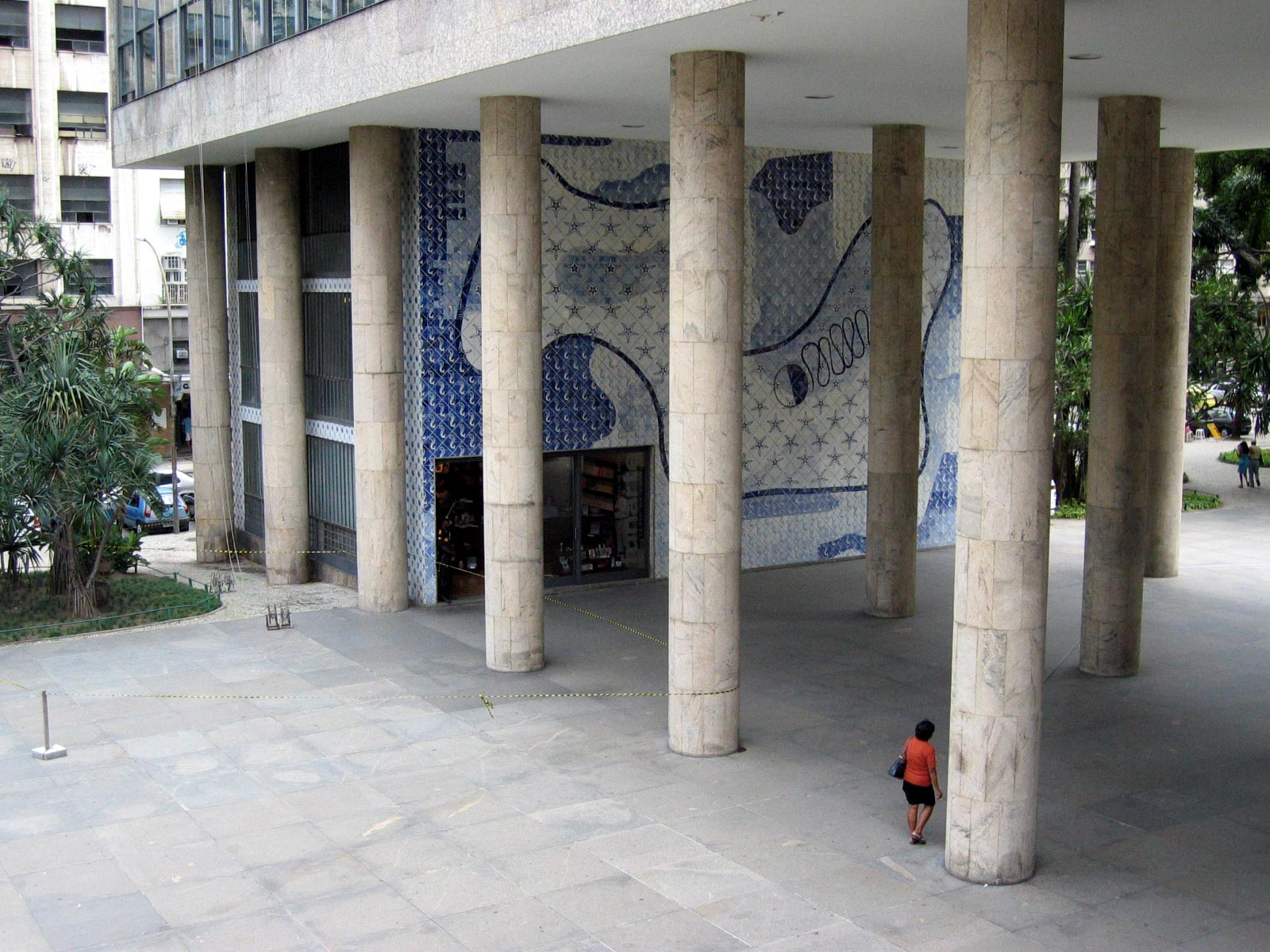
Entrance to the former headquarters of the Ministry of Education and Health, built during the Estado Novo and a landmark of modern architecture in Brazil.

Some of the Estado Novo's characteristics resemble Castilhism, of which Getúlio was a supporter. It had three basic principles valued by the Estado Novo: the choice of rulers based on their moral purity and not on their popular representativeness; in politics, political party disputes should be eliminated, valuing only virtue; the ruler should regenerate society, and the state should lead the transformation and modernization of society.

In line with the national political tradition, Vargas and several members of his government were inspired by European fascism, from which they borrowed the contempt for political parties and the concern to efficiently control the press and education. For this purpose, the Department of Press and Propaganda (DIP) was created, which censored newspapers and produced propaganda on behalf of the government, trying to turn Getúlio Vargas into a myth, as the "father of the poor".

Like the Italian fascists, the Brazilian Estado Novo denied the class struggle, claiming that economic growth was on the side of businessmen and workers. Vargas appeased the workers by creating the Consolidation of Labor Laws (CLT) and setting up official unions, while he pleased the businessmen by creating infrastructure for the growth of industry. Due to his closeness to the lower classes, meeting their demands for certain rights, Getúlio Vargas was considered a populist.

On the other hand, the Estado Novo sought a national identity for the first time in Brazil's history. The concept of "cultural anthropophagy" manifested by the Modern Art Week in São Paulo in 1922 was expanded during the Estado Novo through SPHAN, an institution planned by Mário de Andrade and with intellectual collaborators such as Carlos Drummond de Andrade, Oscar Niemeyer, Lúcio Costa and Cândido Portinari. The idea that there is an authentic Brazilian culture, created by the fusion of indigenous, African and European culture, was consolidated. Not just the three cultures, but the three peoples would live in harmony, creating a united people capable of modernizing the country.

=== Civil and labor law ===
The Estado Novo promulgated the Brazilian Penal Code, the Law of Criminal Contraventions, the Brazilian Code of Criminal Procedure, and CLT, all still in effect. The Code of Civil Procedure represented many advances and was the first modern procedural legislation in Brazil. It was abolished and replaced by the 1973 Code of Civil Procedure, under Law 5.869 of 11 January 1973. Decree-Law No. 1.985 of 29 January 1940 established the Mines Code, in effect until 1967, when the Mining Code replaced it. Decree-Law 7.661 of June 21, 1945 established the Bankruptcy Law, in effect until 2005. Decree-Law No. 2.994, soon replaced by Decree-Law No. 3.651 created the Brazilian Traffic Code.

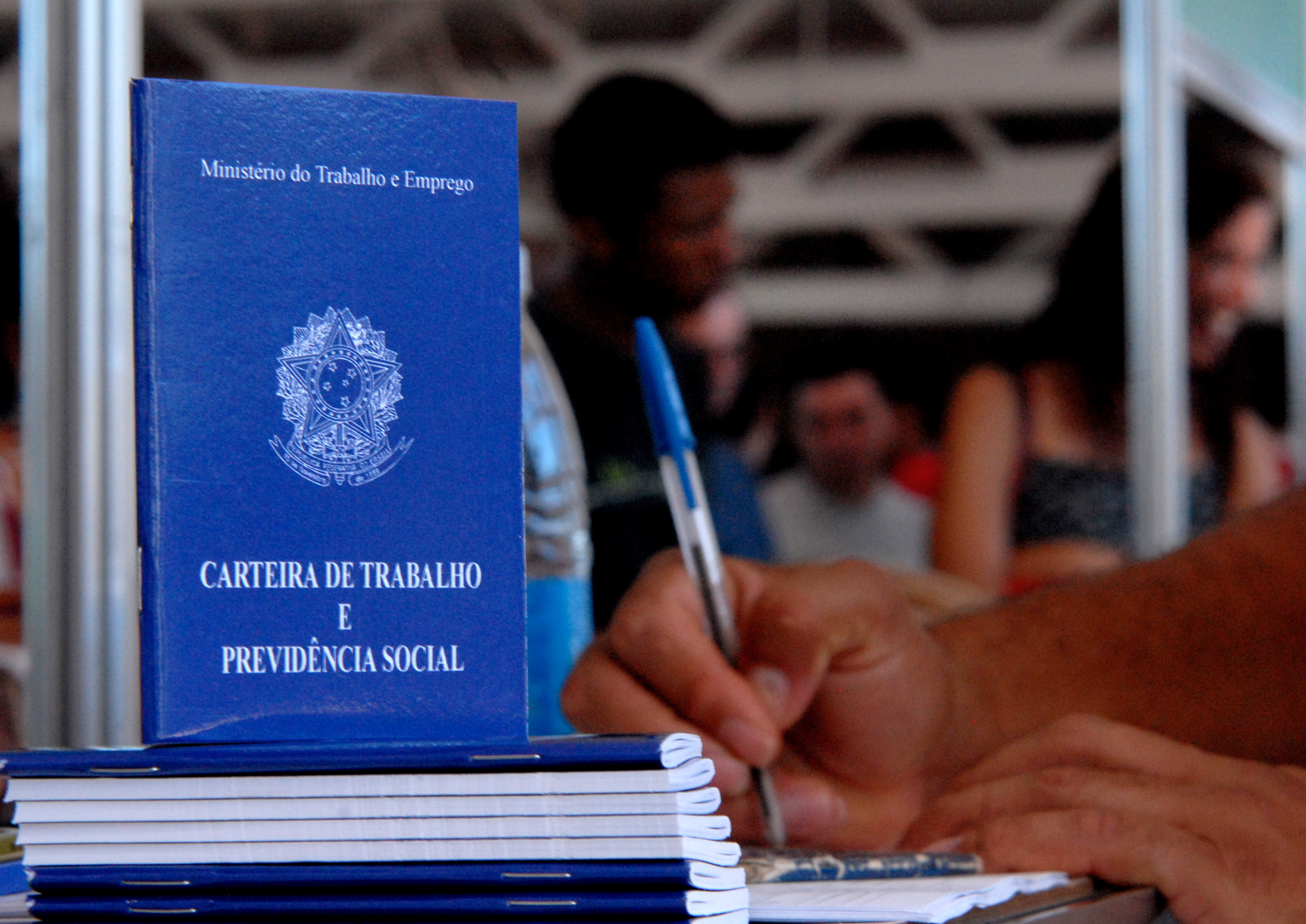
Vargas made the work permit compulsory to consolidate labor rights.

Vargas created the Labor Court on 1 May 1939, established by Decree-Law 1,237 which implemented the minimum wage and granted workers job stability after ten years of employment. On 28 November 1940, Brazil and 13 other coffee-producing countries, plus the United States signed the Inter-American Coffee Agreement in Washington D.C., regulating coffee prices and international trade.

In 1942, Brazil created the territory of Fernando de Noronha, and the Federal Territory of Guaporé (now Rondônia), the Federal Territory of Rio Branco (now Roraima) and the Federal Territory of Amapá. The federal territories of Iguaçu and Ponta Porã were also founded, but did not prosper. Vargas created them after visiting the Central-West of Brazil, when, he writes in his diary, was impressed by the population vacuum in the region. He considered the old Central Brazil "a vast, untapped solitude". In the process he created indigenous reserves for the Guarani Kaiowá, to remove them and facilitate this expansion.

The north of Paraná, previously unpopulated, was colonized and settled with people in a major colonization project carried out by the private sector, especially by Companhia de Terras do Norte do Paraná (Cianorte). Vargas called his effort to occupy the interior of Brazil the "March to the West"; in 1940, Cassiano Ricardo published a book with this title. Mining entrepreneur Jorge Abdalla Chamma, in his book Por um Brasil Melhor, details the Estado Novo's efforts to set up a steel plant in Corumbá. In his electoral campaign when he later ran for president of the republic, Getúlio made a speech 10 September 1950 in Uberaba attributing the development of the Triângulo Mineiro and Central Brazil to zebu cattle breeders:

Fighting against opinions that opposed the introduction of zebu cattle in Brazil, the farmers of the Triângulo Mineiro, supported exclusively by their own work and their own resources, endured all the hardships of the tremendous struggle that was waged, and which, in the end, gave them an undisputed victory. Since then, Central Brazil has become economically significant, transforming it from the vast, untapped loneliness it was then into the large, economically active stronghold it is today.

Decree-Law No 5941 of 28 October 1943 established the Dourados National Agricultural Colony, which made it possible to expand agriculture in the south of what is now Mato Grosso do Sul. Decree-Law No 6882 of 19 February 1941 established the National Agricultural Colony of Goiás.

=== Foreign policy ===
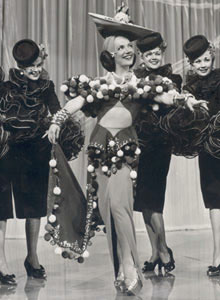
Carmen Miranda was a symbol of the "Good Neighbor policy" between the United States and Brazil.

When Vargas took office in Brazil in 1930, he recognized and complied with all the commitments made by Brazil abroad, which made diplomatic recognition of the Provisional Government easier for foreign governments.

The Vargas government mediated the re-establishment of diplomatic relations between Peru and Uruguay. It received a visit in 1931 from Italian aviators and British princes and in 1934 signed the Protocol of Friendship between Peru and Colombia, ending the Leticia Question. It demarcated 4,535 kilometers of borders between 1930 and 1940 and promoted conciliation between Bolivia and Paraguay, putting an end to the Chaco War, including forgiveness for the Paraguayan debt. Through US President Franklin Roosevelt Brazil obtained a loan from the Export and Import Bank, which it used for public works and purchases for Lloyd Brasileiro and the Estrada de Ferro Central do Brasil. It set up the Inter-American Neutrality Commission in Rio de Janeiro in 1940, signed 86 international acts and 122 bilateral agreements and created the Federal Foreign Trade Council in 1934, the Immigration and Colonization Council in 1938 and the National Economy Defense Council in 1939.

Vargas' policies toward the Axis and the Allies were ambiguous. At first Brazil seemed to be entering the Axis orbit even before the Estado Novo was established. Between 1933 and 1938, Nazi Germany became a primary market for Brazilian cotton, and the second largest importer of Brazilian coffee and cocoa. The rapid increase in civilian and military trade between Brazil and Nazi Germany made US officials question Vargas' international alignment. Furthermore, Varga's ideology was also close to that of the Fascist nations. Although not in Varga's initial intentions, Brazil joined the Allies due to political and economic pressures and necessities such as the funding for infrastructure projects in Brazil, and the geographical proximity with the United States, which had implemented the Good Neighbor Policy.

The Estado Novo sheltered many Jews persecuted by fascist regimes in Europe; João Guimarães Rosa, Brazil's consul in Germany, was posthumously honored by the Israeli government in the 1980s. Brazil was the only South American nation among the founders of the League of Nations (1918) and the UN (1945), and maintained its traditional foreign policy of favoring negotiated resolutions to conflicts.

== See also ==
- Vargas era
- Estado Novo (Portugal)
- Military dictatorship in Brazil
- Nationalization campaign
