= List of governors of São Paulo =

List of political leaders

Governor of São Paulo
- Standard of the governor

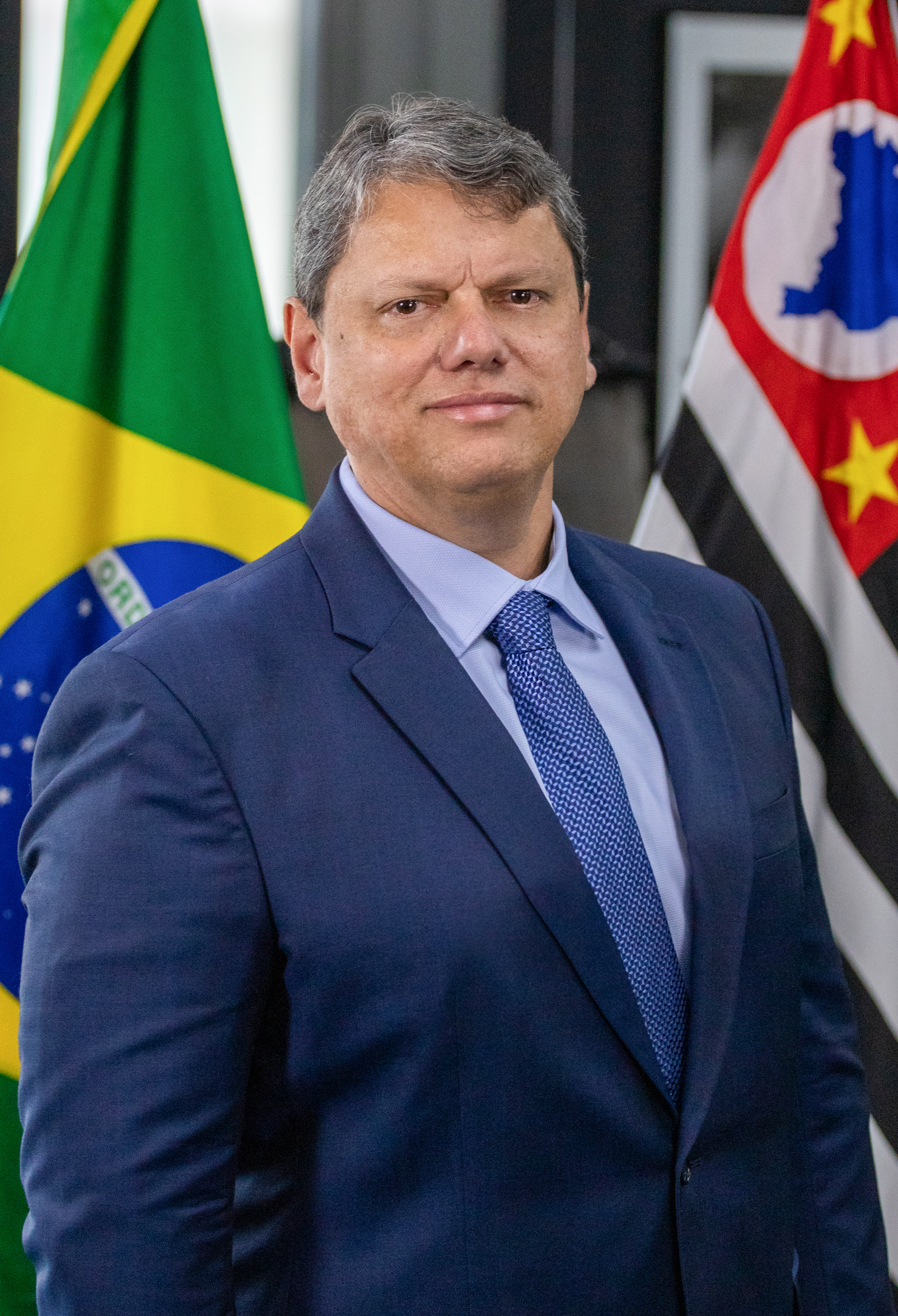
- Incumbent; Tarcísio de Freitas since 1 January 2023
- Style: Mr. Governor or even simply Governor (informal); Most Excellent Mr. Governor (formal); His Excellency (alternative formal, diplomatic)
- Status: Head of government
- Residence: Palácio dos Bandeirantes
- Appointer: Popular vote
- Term length: Four years, renewable once consecutively
- Constituting instrument: 1989 State Constitution
- Precursor: President of São Paulo Province
- Inaugural holder: Prudente de Moraes
- Formation: 14 December 1889; 136 years ago
- Succession: Line of succession
- Deputy: Vice Governor of São Paulo
- Salary: R$ 34,572.89 monthly (US$ 10,283)
- Website: www.saopaulo.sp.gov.br

The Governor of São Paulo is the position of the head of government of São Paulo, Brazil.

== Line of succession ==
According to Article 40 of the State Constitution, the line of succession is as follows:

1. Vice-Governor
2. President of the Legislative Assembly
3. President of the State Court of Justice

== First Republic (1889–1930) ==
No.	Portrait	Governor	Took office	Left office	Time in office	Party	Election	Vice Governor
–	Provisional Governative Junta	Provisional Governative Junta; Acting	15 November 1889	14 December 1889	29 days	Republican Party of São Paulo	–	None
1	Prudente de Morais	Prudente de Morais (1841–1902)	14 December 1889	18 October 1890	308 days	Republican Party of São Paulo	–	Francisco Glicério (Republican Party of São Paulo); Luís Pereira Barreto (Republican Party of São Paulo)
2	Jorge Tibiriçá	Jorge Tibiriçá (1855–1928)	18 October 1890	7 March 1891	140 days	Republican Party of São Paulo	–	Francisco Glicério (Republican Party of São Paulo); Luís Pereira Barreto (Republican Party of São Paulo)
3	Américo Brasiliense	Américo Brasiliense (1833–1896)	7 March 1891	15 December 1891	283 days	Republican Party of São Paulo	– 1891	Francisco Glicério (Republican Party of São Paulo); Luís Pereira Barreto (Republican Party of São Paulo); Cerqueira César (Republican Party of São Paulo)
4	Sérgio Castelo Branco	Sérgio Castelo Branco (1844–1894)	15 December 1891	16 December 1891	1 day	Republican Party of São Paulo	–	None
5	Cerqueira César	Cerqueira César (1835–1911)	16 December 1891	23 August 1892	251 days	Republican Party of São Paulo	–	None
6	Bernardino de Campos	Bernardino de Campos (1841–1915)	23 August 1892	15 April 1896	3 years, 236 days	Republican Party of São Paulo	1892	Cerqueira César (Republican Party of São Paulo)
7	Peixoto Gomide	Peixoto Gomide (1849–1906)	15 April 1896	1 May 1896	16 days	Republican Party of São Paulo	–	Cerqueira César (Republican Party of São Paulo)
8	Campos Sales	Campos Sales (1841–1913)	1 May 1896	31 October 1897	1 year, 183 days	Republican Party of São Paulo	1896	Peixoto Gomide (Republican Party of São Paulo)
9	Peixoto Gomide	Peixoto Gomide (1849–1906)	31 October 1897	10 November 1898	1 year, 10 days	Republican Party of São Paulo	–	Vacant
10	Fernando Prestes	Fernando Prestes (1855–1937)	10 November 1898	1 May 1900	1 year, 172 days	Republican Party of São Paulo	1898	Peixoto Gomide (Republican Party of São Paulo)
11	Rodrigues Alves	Rodrigues Alves (1848–1919)	1 May 1900	13 February 1902	1 year, 288 days	Republican Party of São Paulo	1900	Domingos de Morais (Republican Party of São Paulo)
12	Domingos de Morais	Domingos de Morais (1851–1917)	13 February 1902	3 July 1902	140 days	Republican Party of São Paulo	–	Vacant
13	Bernardino de Campos	Bernardino de Campos (1841–1915)	3 July 1902	1 May 1904	1 year, 303 days	Republican Party of São Paulo	1902	Domingos de Morais (Republican Party of São Paulo)
14	Jorge Tibiriçá	Jorge Tibiriçá (1855–1928)	1 May 1904	1 May 1908	4 years, 0 days	Republican Party of São Paulo	1904	João Baptista de Mello Oliveira (Republican Party of São Paulo)
15	Albuquerque Lins	Albuquerque Lins (1852–1926)	1 May 1908	1 May 1912	4 years, 0 days	Republican Party of São Paulo	1908	Francisco Prestes (Republican Party of São Paulo)
16	Rodrigues Alves	Rodrigues Alves (1848–1919)	1 May 1912	1 May 1916	4 years, 0 days	Republican Party of São Paulo	1912	Carlos Augusto Pereira Guimarães (Republican Party of São Paulo)
17	Altino Arantes	Altino Arantes (1876–1965)	1 May 1916	1 May 1920	4 years, 0 days	Republican Party of São Paulo	1916	Antônio Cândido Rodrigues (Republican Party of São Paulo)
18	Washington Luís	Washington Luís (1869–1957)	1 May 1920	1 May 1924	4 years, 0 days	Republican Party of São Paulo	1920	Virgílio Rodrigues Alves (Republican Party of São Paulo); Vacant
19	Carlos de Campos	Carlos de Campos (1866–1927)	1 May 1924	27 April 1927	2 years, 361 days	Republican Party of São Paulo	1924	Fernando Prestes (Republican Party of São Paulo)
20	Antônio Dino Bueno	Antônio Dino Bueno (1854–1931)	27 April 1927	14 July 1927	78 days	Republican Party of São Paulo	–	Vacant
21	Júlio Prestes	Júlio Prestes (1882–1946)	14 July 1927	21 May 1930	2 years, 311 days	Republican Party of São Paulo	1927	Heitor Penteado (Republican Party of São Paulo)
22	Heitor Penteado	Heitor Penteado (1878–1947)	21 May 1930	24 October 1930	156 days	Republican Party of São Paulo	–	Vacant

== Second and Third Republic "Vargas Era" (1930–1945) ==
No.	Portrait	Governor	Took office	Left office	Time in office	Party
23	Hastínfilo de Moura	Hastínfilo de Moura (1865–1956)	24 October 1930	28 October 1930	4 days	PD
24	José Maria Whitaker	José Maria Whitaker (1879–1971)	28 October 1930	4 November 1930	7 days	PD
25	Plínio Barreto	Plínio Barreto (1882–1958)	4 November 1930	25 November 1930	21 days	PD
26	João Alberto de Barros	João Alberto de Barros (1897–1955)	25 November 1930	25 July 1931	242 days	UDR
27	Laudo Camargo	Laudo Camargo (1881–1963)	25 July 1931	13 November 1931	111 days	PP
28	Manuel Rabelo	Manuel Rabelo (1873–1945)	13 November 1931	7 March 1932	115 days	PP
29	Pedro Toledo	Pedro Toledo (1860–1935)	7 March 1932	2 October 1932	209 days	PP
30	Herculano de Carvalho e Silva	Herculano de Carvalho e Silva (1892–1963)	2 October 1932	6 October 1932	4 days	Republican Party of São Paulo
31	Valdomiro Castilho de Lima	Valdomiro Castilho de Lima (1873–1938)	6 October 1932	27 July 1933	294 days	Republican Party of São Paulo
32	Manuel Daltro Filho	Manuel Daltro Filho (1882–1938)	27 July 1933	21 August 1933	25 days	Republican Party of São Paulo
33	Armando Sales	Armando Sales (1887–1945)	21 August 1933	29 December 1936	3 years, 130 days	PCSP; UDB
34	Henrique Smith Bayma	Henrique Smith Bayma (1891–1974)	29 December 1936	5 January 1937	7 days	PCSP
35	José Cardoso de Melo Neto	José Cardoso de Melo Neto (1883–1965)	5 January 1937	25 April 1938	1 year, 110 days	UDB
36	Francisco da Silva Júnior	Francisco da Silva Júnior (1879–1948)	25 April 1938	27 April 1938	2 days	Independent
37	Adhemar de Barros	Adhemar de Barros (1901–1969)	27 April 1938	4 June 1941	3 years, 38 days	Independent
38	Fernando de Sousa Costa	Fernando de Sousa Costa (1886–1946)	4 June 1941	27 October 1945	4 years, 145 days	Independent
39	Sebastião Nogueira de Lima	Sebastião Nogueira de Lima (1881–1964)	27 October 1945	7 November 1945	11 days	Independent

== Fourth Republic (1945–1964) ==
No.	Portrait	Governor	Took office	Left office	Time in office	Party	Election	Vice Governor
40	José Macedo Soares	José Macedo Soares (1883–1968)	7 November 1945	14 March 1947	1 year, 127 days	PDC	–	Vacant
41	Adhemar de Barros	Adhemar de Barros (1901–1969)	14 March 1947	31 January 1951	3 years, 323 days	PSP	1947	Luís Novelli Júnior (PSP)
42	Lucas Nogueira Garcez	Lucas Nogueira Garcez (1913–1982)	31 January 1951	31 January 1955	4 years, 0 days	PSP	1950	Erlindo Salzano (PSP)
43	Jânio Quadros	Jânio Quadros (1917–1992)	31 January 1955	31 January 1959	4 years, 0 days	PTN	1954	Porfírio da Paz (PTN)
44	Carvalho Pinto	Carvalho Pinto (1910–1987)	31 January 1959	31 January 1963	4 years, 0 days	PDC	1958	Porfírio da Paz (PTN)
45	Adhemar de Barros	Adhemar de Barros (1901–1969)	31 January 1963	6 June 1966	3 years, 126 days	PSP	1962	Laudo Natel (PR)

== Fifth Republic "Military Dictatorship" (1964–1985) ==
No.	Portrait	Governor	Took office	Left office	Time in office	Party	Election	Vice Governor
46	Laudo Natel	Laudo Natel (1920–2020)	6 June 1966	31 January 1967	239 days	ARENA	–	Vacant
47	Abreu Sodré	Abreu Sodré (1917–1999)	31 January 1967	15 March 1971	4 years, 43 days	ARENA	1966	Hilário Torloni (ARENA)
48	Laudo Natel	Laudo Natel (1920–2020)	15 March 1971	15 March 1975	4 years, 0 days	ARENA	1970	Antônio Rodrigues Filho (ARENA)
49	Paulo Egydio Martins	Paulo Egydio Martins (1928–2021)	15 March 1975	15 March 1979	4 years, 0 days	ARENA	1974	Ferreira Filho (ARENA)
50	Paulo Maluf	Paulo Maluf (born 1931)	15 March 1979	14 May 1982	3 years, 60 days	PDS	1978	José Maria Marin (PDS)
51	José Maria Marin	José Maria Marin (1932–2025)	14 May 1982	15 March 1983	305 days	PDS	–	Vacant
52	Franco Montoro	Franco Montoro (1916–1999)	15 March 1983	15 March 1987	4 years, 0 days	MDB	1982	Orestes Quércia (MDB); Vacant

== Sixth Republic (1985–present) ==
No.	Portrait	Governor	Took office	Left office	Time in office	Party	Election	Vice Governor
53	Orestes Quércia	Orestes Quércia (1938–2010)	15 March 1987	15 March 1991	4 years, 0 days	MDB	1986	Almino Afonso (MDB); Vacant
54	Luiz Antônio Fleury Filho	Luiz Antônio Fleury Filho (1949–2022)	15 March 1991	1 January 1995	3 years, 292 days	MDB	1990	Aloysio Nunes (MDB)
55	Mário Covas	Mário Covas (1930–2001)	1 January 1995	6 March 2001	6 years, 64 days	PSDB	1994; 1998	Geraldo Alckmin (PSDB)
56	Geraldo Alckmin	Geraldo Alckmin (born 1952)	6 March 2001	31 March 2006	5 years, 25 days	PSDB	– 2002	Vacant; Cláudio Lembo (PFL)
57	Cláudio Lembo	Cláudio Lembo (1934–2025)	31 March 2006	1 January 2007	276 days	PFL	–	Vacant
58	José Serra	José Serra (born 1942)	1 January 2007	2 April 2010	3 years, 91 days	PSDB	2006	Alberto Goldman (PSDB)
59	Alberto Goldman	Alberto Goldman (1937–2019)	2 April 2010	1 January 2011	274 days	PSDB	–	Vacant
60	Geraldo Alckmin	Geraldo Alckmin (born 1952)	1 January 2011	6 April 2018	7 years, 95 days	PSDB	2010; 2014	Guilherme Afif Domingos (DEM); Márcio França (PSB)
61	Márcio França	Márcio França (born 1963)	6 April 2018	1 January 2019	270 days	PSB	–	Vacant
62	João Doria	João Doria (born 1957)	1 January 2019	1 April 2022	3 years, 90 days	PSDB	2018	Rodrigo Garcia (DEM)
63	Rodrigo Garcia	Rodrigo Garcia (born 1974)	1 April 2022	1 January 2023	275 days	PSDB	–	Vacant
64	Tarcísio de Freitas	Tarcísio de Freitas (born 1975)	1 January 2023	Incumbent	3 years, 290 days	Republicanos	2022	Felicio Ramuth (PSD)
