= Valdomiro Castilho de Lima =

Brazilian soldier and politician

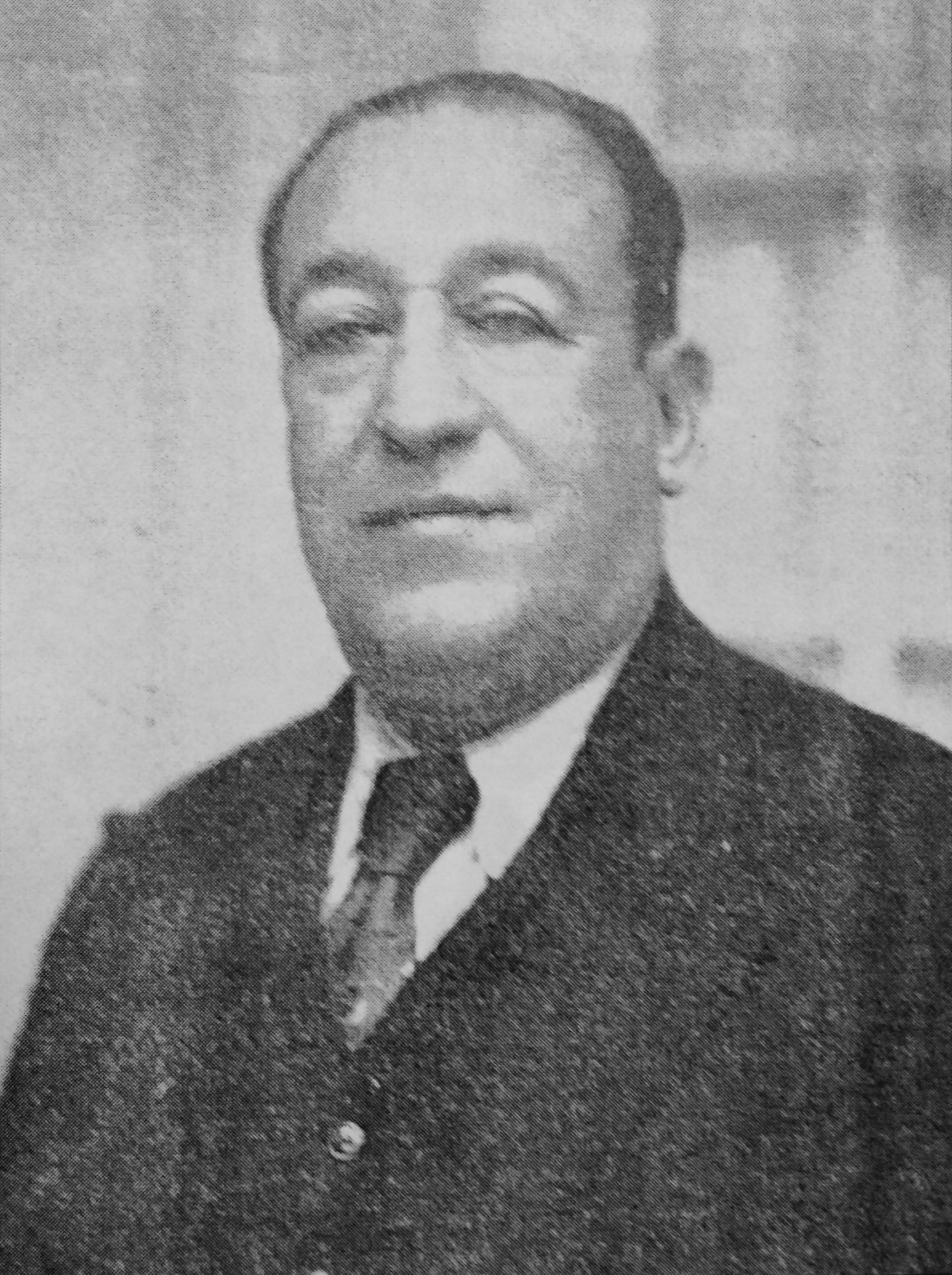

Federal Interventor of São Paulo
- In office 6 October 1932 – 27 July 1933
- Preceded by: Herculano de Carvalho e Silva
- Succeeded by: Manuel Daltro Filho

State Deputy of Rio Grande do Sul
- In office 1904–1913
- Constituency: At-large

Personal details
- Born: 15 January 1873 Rio Grande do Sul, Brazil
- Died: 12 February 1938 (aged 65) Petrópolis, Rio de Janeiro, Brazil

Military service
- Allegiance: Brazil
- Branch/service: Brazilian Army
- Years of service: 1890–1938
- Rank: Divisional general
- Commands: 3rd Artillery Regiment; 2nd Military Region; 1st Military Region
- Battles/wars: Federalist Revolution; Tenentism; Revolution of 1930; Constitutionalist Revolution; Battle of Praça da Sé

Valdomiro Castilho de Lima (15 January 1873 – 12 February 1938) was a Brazilian soldier and politician.

== Biography ==
He was born in Rio Grande do Sul. He began his military career in the regiment of the border Garrison of missions in 1890. Later, he attended the School of Shooting and Tactics of Rio Pardo. He participated in the Federalist Revolution of 1893 alongside loyalist forces, and in 1898, he joined the military school of Red Beach in Rio de Janeiro.

In 1904, he was elected State representative for Rio Grande do Sul and consecutively reelected until 1913. After his tenure in the Legislative Council, he returned to the army. In 1920, he enrolled in the School of Staff of the Army.

Taking command of the 3rd Infantry Regiment in Red Beach, he arrived to quell the first tenentistas of the 1920 uprisings. However, he became sympathetic to the cause, was reformed and arrested, and remained in this position from 1923 to 1925. In 1929, he joined the Liberal Alliance. In the Revolution of 1930, he held a command post in the revolutionary troops who invaded the headquarters of the 3rd military region in Porto Alegre. Additionally, he led a column of 4000 soldiers out of Rio Grande do Sul and reached Paraná. For his services, he was re-incorporated into active duty in the army as a general of Division under Delaware General Corporation law. In 1932, he fought against the Paulistas in the Constitutionalist Revolution. With the victory, he was appointed by Getúlio Vargas as the federal intervenor in the State of São Paulo. He held office from October 1932 to July 27, 1933. During this period, he also served as the Commander of the second military region. He lost the 1933 Constitutional Assembly election and was replaced by Armando de Sales Oliveira as federal intervenor of São Paulo.

In 1935, he participated in a group of observers sent by Brazil to watch the Second Italo-Ethiopian War, where he was impressed by the CV-33 Italian tankettes. As a result, Brazil acquired several dozens of them. In 1936, he assumed command of the 1st military region but was removed from this post in June 1937 due to political divergence with General Góes Monteiro. He died in Petropolis.

== See also ==
- Politics of Brazil

Government offices
Preceded by Pedro de Toledo	Governor of São Paulo; 1932–1933	Succeeded by Armando de Sales Oliveira
