= José Joaquim Cardoso de Melo Neto =

José de Melo Neto
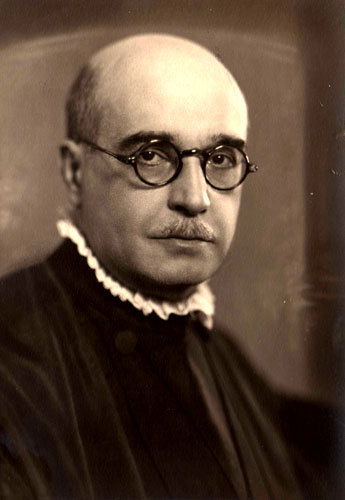
- Melo Neto, c. 1937

President of São Paulo
- In office 5 January 1937 – 10 November 1937
- Preceded by: Henrique Smith Bayma
- Succeeded by: Francisco da Silva Júnior

Mayor of São Paulo
- In office 24 October 1930 – 5 December 1930
- Preceded by: José Pires do Rio
- Succeeded by: Anhaia Melo

Personal details
- Born: 19 July 1883 São Paulo, São Paulo, Empire of Brazil
- Died: 20 July 1965 (aged 82) São Paulo, São Paulo, Brazil

José Joaquim Cardoso de Melo Neto (19 July 1883 – 20 July 1965) was a Brazilian lawyer, professor and politician.

== Education ==
Cardoso de Melo Neto did his preparatory courses at Escola Complementar, an appendix to Escola Normal de São Paulo. In 1901, he enrolled at the traditional Faculdade de Direito do Largo de São Francisco, getting his bachelor on Law School in August 1906. During his studies, Cardoso occupied the presidency of the Círculo Jurídico Acadêmico.

Four years later, in 1910, he became president of the Sociedade Anônima Elétrica Rio Claro, a notorious company on the field of electric energy in the State of São Paulo, where he remained until 1934.

In October 1917, as a substitute professor, Cardoso got his title at the fifth section of the Administrative Law, Administration Science, Economic Politics and Finance Science chair. In 1920, he would be entitled a professor of the last two. Afterwards, in 1941, he became the director of the school he once studied at. Thus, in November 1953, Cardoso received the title of emeritus professor of the school.

Cardoso was also one of the founders of Liga Nacionalista, created in 1917 as an ideia from Rui Barbosa and the poet Olavo Bilac. The goal was to adopt the practice of secret voting and the obligatoriness of the military service. In 1926, he would help the founding of the Partido Democrático (Democratic Party) of São Paulo.

Besides remaining as the head of Mercantil Bank, Carsoso was also a part of Comercial Bank of the State of São Paulo's (Banco Comercial do Estado de São Paulo), Rodrigues Alves Agricultural Company's (Companhia Agrícola Rodrigues Alves) and Piraçununga's Wiring and Weaving's (Fiação e Tecelagem de Piraçununga) Administrative Council.

== Democratic Party (Partido Democrático - PD) ==
One of the Democratic Party's first achievements was to urge to the February 1928's state campaign, which resulted in the election of several deputies. Cardoso de Melo Neto, for instance, was elected from the fifth district of São Paulo. However, as many other candidates from his party, he didn't get his election legitimized.

In the beginning of 1929, the Democratic Party joined the Liberal Alliance, a coalition of politic forces in opposition to the Washington Luís's government that introduced the candidacy of Getúlio Vargas and João Pessoa to the Brazilian presidency and vice-presidency. Cardoso de Melo Neto, as the representative chosen, was part of the Liberal Alliance's convention which validated the opposition's candidacy pleas.

== Political life ==
The win by the Liberal Alliance made even stronger the ties from its various areas, including the Democratic Party. The process of preparing an armed movement got intensified after the murder of João Pessoa, which took place on July 26, 1930. On October 24, it took place Washington Luís's deposition in Rio de Janeiro, leaving the govern to be composed by three official-generals from the army, whom which decided to give the post to general Hastínfilo de Moura, commanding officer of the second Military Region. Having governed provisionally the state for only four days, (until October 28, 1930), the general composed sort of a council, of which members of the Democratic Party were part of. During this period, which became known as "the 40 days government", general Hastínfilo de Moura got replaced by José Maria Whitaker, Plínio Barreto and, finally, captain João Alberto Lins de Barros. Cardoso de Melo Neto became the mayor of São Paulo, capital of the state of São Paulo.

Cardoso also represented the Democratic Party on the negotiations for the creation of the Chapa Única por São Paulo Unido (Single Party to unite São Paulo). The plate, which mixed the Democratic Party, the Paulista's Republican Party, the Catholic Electoral League and the Volunteer's Federation, was fighting for liberal and federalist characteristics, going against the politic and economic centralization organized by the federal government, then ruled by general Valdomiro Lima.

In February 1924, Cardoso de Melo joined the new Constitutionalist Party, the result of the merge between the Democratic Party, the Republican's National Act and the Volunteers Federation, guided by Armando de Sales Oliveira. Elected as federal deputy on the same year, Cardoso got to join the Mixed Commission of Economic-Finance Reform, and accumulated his parliamentary roles to the presidency of São Paulo's Mercantil Bank and the lighting company Jundiaí's Strength.

== Personal life ==
Cardoso de Melo Neto died in 1965, in São Paulo. Through his lifetime, he was married to Celina Rodrigues Alves Cardoso de Melo (former president Francisco de Paula Rodrigues Alves's daughter) with whom he had two kids.

Preceded by José Pires do Rio	Mayor of Sao Paulo; 1930	Succeeded by Luís Inácio de Anhaia Melo
Preceded by Henrique Smith Bayma	Governor of Sao Paulo; 1937–1938	Succeeded by
