= Laudo Natel =

Brazilian politician

Governor of São Paulo
- In office 15 March 1971 – 15 March 1975
- Vice Governor: Antônio José Rodrigues Filho
- Preceded by: Abreu Sodré
- Succeeded by: Paulo Egydio Martins
- In office 6 June 1966 – 31 January 1967
- Vice Governor: None
- Preceded by: Adhemar de Barros
- Succeeded by: Abreu Sodré

Vice Governor of São Paulo
- In office 31 January 1963 – 6 June 1966
- Governor: Adhemar de Barros
- Preceded by: Porfírio da Paz
- Succeeded by: Hilário Torloni
Other offices
President of São Paulo FC
In office 30 April 1958 – 15 March 1971
Preceded by	Cícero Pompeu de Toledo
Succeeded by	Henri Aidar

Personal details
- Born: 14 September 1920 São Manuel, Brazil
- Died: 18 May 2020 (aged 99) São Paulo, Brazil
- Party: PR (1945–1965); ARENA (1965–1979); PDS (1980–1993); PPR (1993–1995); PP (1995–2020)
- Spouse: Maria Zilda Natel
- Profession: Businessman

Laudo Natel (14 September 1920 – 18 May 2020) was a Brazilian politician, businessman and sports executive.

== Early life and career ==
Son of Bento Alves Natel and Albertina Barone, Natel studied in the cities of Mirassol and Araraquara. After graduating, he began a career in the banking sector, holding a wide range of positions. He was an employee at Banco Noroeste, where he was a colleague of Amador Aguiar, which would later take him to the Banco Brasileiro de Descontos, currently Bradesco. Natel followed his friend, being for a long time his right-hand man, becoming director of the bank. He was also director of the São Paulo Commercial Association, director of the São Paulo Banks Union and president of the banking committee of the National Monetary Council.

Elected treasurer of São Paulo FC in 1952, he grew politically at the club, reaching the offices of financial director and later president. He became a patron of the club, thanks to his work in prospecting for resources to enable the construction of the Estádio do Morumbi.

== Political career ==
In 1962, with an electoral campaign organized by Osvaldo Moles, he was elected vice-governor, running on his own accord — in the electoral system at the time, the vote for vice-governor was separate of that for governor. He was therefore elected on a ticket different from that composed by the elected governor, Adhemar de Barros. In 1965, Natel ran for mayor of the city of São Paulo, but lost the elections to Brigadeiro Faria Lima.

Natel taking office as governor of São Paulo in 1971

Laudo Natel was governor of São Paulo twice. The first, between 6 June 1966 and 31 January 1967, occurred when, as vice-governor, he replaced the then-governor Ademar de Barros after he was removed from office by the Brazilian military government. To take office, he took a leave of absence from the position of president of São Paulo FC, to which he had been elected two months earlier. In his first term in government, continuing a project by Ademar, Natel unified the eleven hydroelectric plants in São Paulo, creating the Companhia Energética de São Paulo (CESP) and modernized the state finance system, through his secretary Antônio Delfim Netto.

The second term, between 15 March 1971 and 15 March 1975, occurred when he was elected indirectly by the electoral college. During this period of government, he emphasized the development of the interior, with the Development Interiorization Road Plan (PROINDE), unifying the entire São Paulo railway network around the FEPASA (Ferrovia Paulista S/A), construction of the ascending runway of the Rodovia dos Imigrantes, created Sabesp and Cetesb, opened the first metro stations and prepared a plan for the development of the Vale do Ribeira.

During his term, he fired mayor of São Paulo José Carlos de Figueiredo Ferraz by letter due to numerous administrative disagreements. To justify this, he alleged that Figueiredo Ferraz had a "lack of harmony" with the State and the Union. The most accepted version is that Figueiredo Ferraz was fired for saying that São Paulo had to "stop growing".

Chosen by Palácio do Planalto, he ran for a third term in 1978, but was defeated at his party's convention (ARENA) by Paulo Maluf, who had been the Secretary of Transport in his second term. He again ran for the state government in 1982, but also lost in the primaries of the party (this time the PDS, the successor of ARENA), now to Reynaldo de Barros, then mayor of São Paulo and linked to Maluf

== Tributes ==
In 2005, he was honored by the São Paulo FC, by having the club's new training center being named after him. Being from the countryside, Natel referred to himself as being a "caipira governor".

The Veterinary Hospital, Auxiliary Unit of the Faculty of Agricultural and Veterinary Sciences (FCAV) - UNESP - Jaboticabal Campus, opened in 1974, also bears his name.

== Death ==
Natel died on 18 May 2020, in São Paulo, four months before turning one hundred years old.
