= Paulo Egydio Martins =

Brazilian businessman and politician (1928-2021)

Governor of São Paulo
- In office March 15, 1975 – March 15, 1979
- Vice Governor: Manoel Gonçalves Ferreira Filho
- Preceded by: Laudo Natel
- Succeeded by: Paulo Maluf

Minister of Development, Industry, Trade and Services
- In office January 13, 1966 – March 15, 1967
- President: Castelo Branco
- Preceded by: Daniel Agostinho Faraco
- Succeeded by: Macedo Soares

Minister of Labour
- In office July 18, 1966 – August 1, 1966
- Preceded by: Walter Peracchi Barcelos
- Succeeded by: Luís Gonzaga do Nascimento e Silva

Personal details
- Born: Paulo Egydio Martins; 2 May 1928 São Paulo, Brazil
- Died: 12 February 2021 (aged 92) São Paulo, Brazil
- Party: ARENA (1966-1979); PP (1980-1981); PDS (1983-1984); MDB (1984-1988); PSDB (2005–2021)
- Spouse: Brasília Martins
- Children: 7
- Parent(s): Mother: Júlia Machado Martins; Father: Paulo César Gomes Martins
- Occupation: Businessman and politician

Paulo Egydio Martins (May 2, 1928 – February 12, 2021) was a Brazilian businessman and politician affiliated with the Brazilian Social Democracy Party (PSDB). He was governor of the state of São Paulo between 1975 and 1979 during Brazil's military dictatorship.

== Biography ==
Son of Paulo César Gomes Martins and Júlia Machado, Paulo graduated from the National School of Engineering at the University of Brazil (now Polytechnic School of Federal University of Rio de Janeiro) in Rio de Janeiro in 1951. He was superintendent of the Engineering Department and general manager of Byington & Cia. In 2007, Paulo launched the book Paulo Egydio conta, which was published by the Official Press of the State of São Paulo and the Getúlio Vargas Foundation.

== Political career ==
=== Ministerial positions ===
Paulo Egydio began his political career in 1966, when he became Minister of Industry and Commerce under the government of President Humberto Castelo Branco. He was a major shareholder in Banco Comind and CEO of Itaucorp S/A. In 1966, Paulo temporarily replaced Colonel Valter Peracchi Barcelos, the Minister of Labour, who had been chosen by ARENA to run in the indirect elections for the government of Rio Grande do Sul, scheduled for September 1966.

=== Governor of São Paulo ===
Paulo Egydio governed the state of São Paulo between 1975 and 1979. He was indirectly elected during Ernesto Geisel's government by the electoral college of the Legislative Assembly. At the time, he was affiliated with the National Renewal Alliance (ARENA). At the beginning of his administration, Paulo faced the epidemics of meningococcal meningitis and the first encephalitis pandemics in the state, including Greater São Paulo and the South Coast.

Paulo Egydio Martins when he was Minister of Development, Industry, Trade and Services.

In 1975, journalist Vladimir Herzog, director of journalism at TV Cultura, a television channel owned by the Padre Anchieta Foundation, was tortured and murdered in the DOI-CODI. Metalworker Manoel Fiel Filho was also murdered in the DOI-CODI in 1976. José Mindlin, Secretary of Culture, left the government after the episode. In 1977, the violent repression of the student demonstration at PUC, under the orders of Colonel Erasmo Dias, also happened during his administration.

During his government, Paulo Egydio inaugurated important infrastructure projects, such as the Rodovia dos Bandeirantes and the ascending lane of the Rodovia dos Imigrantes. He also signed the agreement between the Ministry of Aeronautics and the state government on May 4, 1976, which led to the construction of São Paulo-Guarulhos International Airport in the 1980s.

In the health sector, Paulo Egydio built the outpatient clinic building, the Heart Institute and the Children's Institute at the University of São Paulo School of Medicine Teaching Hospital, as well as 67 research laboratories. He built the University Hospital of the University of São Paulo and the Ribeirão Preto Teaching Hospital, and inaugurated the São Paulo State University (UNESP). He renovated the São Carlos bus station and the highway linking Rodovia Dutra to Campos do Jordão, and built the Claudio Santoro Auditorium in Campos do Jordão.

== See also ==
- São Paulo State Government
