= Abreu Sodré =

Brazilian politician

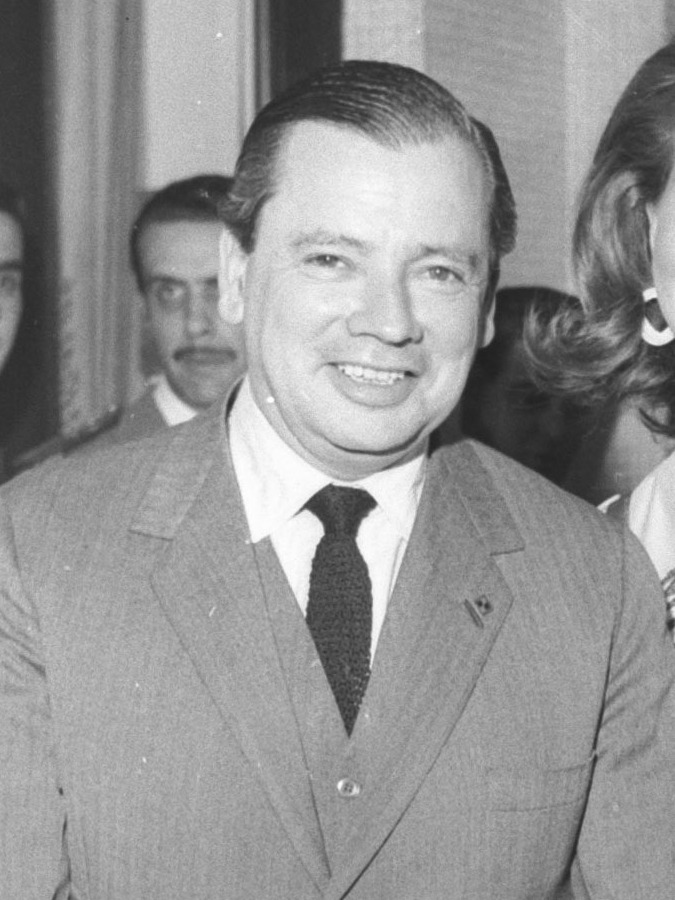

Minister of Foreign Affairs
- In office 14 February 1986 – 15 March 1990
- President: José Sarney
- Preceded by: Olavo Setúbal
- Succeeded by: Francisco Rezek

Governor of São Paulo
- In office 31 January 1967 – 15 March 1971
- Vice Governor: Hilário Torloni
- Preceded by: Laudo Natel
- Succeeded by: Laudo Natel

Personal details
- Born: Roberto Costa de Abreu Sodré; 21 June 1917 São Paulo, Brazil
- Died: 14 September 1999 (aged 82) São Paulo, Brazil
- Party: UDN; ARENA; PDS; PFL
- Spouse: Maria do Carmo Mellão de Abreu Sodré
- Profession: Lawyer, businessman

Roberto Costa de Abreu Sodré (21 June 1917 — 14 September 1999) was a Brazilian lawyer, businessman and politician. He was a state deputy, governor of the State of São Paulo and Minister of Foreign Affairs of Brazil.

He was one of the founders of the National Democratic Union (UDN) in 1945, and later a member of the National Renewal Alliance (ARENA), from 1966. He was indirectly elected to the government of São Paulo, a position he held from 31 January 1967 to 15 March 1971.

He was married to Maria do Carmo Mellão de Abreu Sodré, who died on January 24, 2012, who was president of the Social Solidarity Fund, which she encouraged her husband to create as soon as he took over the São Paulo government in 1967.

His father, Francisco Sodré, was the second mayor of the municipality of Santa Cruz do Rio Pardo and was responsible for the arrival of the Sorocabana Railway tracks. Because of this, one of the districts of Santa Cruz do Rio Pardo was named Sodrélia.

== Governorship ==
Abreu Sodré was the first governor to be indirectly elected, for the period from 1967 to 1971, during the period of the Brazilian military dictatorship.

In energy, he continued with the state's energy plan, implementing the Urubupungá line towards São Paulo. In transport, he completed the first section of the Rodovia do Oeste, whose name was changed to Rodovia Castelo Branco, in honor of the recently deceased president. Abreu Sodré also began the construction of Rodovia dos Imigrantes, as an alternative to Rodovia Anchieta, which was already on the verge of saturation; also began the first excavations for the construction of the São Paulo Metro. His government was also responsible for acquiring the first Boeing 737 in Brazilian civil aviation, provided to VASP.

In basic sanitation, he created the companies Comasp (Companhia Metropolitana de Abastecimento), focused on water production, and Sanesp (Saneamento do Estado de São Paulo), focused on sewage treatment, companies that would later give rise to Sabesp (Companhia de Saneamento Básico do Estado de São Paulo), along with other state-owned companies. During this period, Abreu Sodré began water supply works for the Cantareira System, in the North Zone of the City of São Paulo;

In public security, during this period the state security force, then called Public Force, was renamed the Military Police; in addition to the name, the institution began to receive instructions and apparatus from the Army, DOI-CODI and other institutions linked to the military regime at the time.

In education and culture, he also oversaw the creation of the Fundação Padre Anchieta and the TV broadcasters TV Cultura and Rádio Cultura of São Paulo and also created the CEETEPS (Paula Souza State Center for Technological Education), a state agency linked to the Department of Development, Science and Technology, responsible for ETECs and FATECS, which offer secondary education, technical and higher education courses.

A controversial gesture of his tenure was the gift he distributed to the players of the Brazilian team that won the 1970 FIFA World Cup. Sodré distributed miniatures of the Jules Rimet Trophy made in gold to the players and the coaching staff. The government ordered 50 miniatures, but only distributed 42; it is not known what happened to the other eight miniatures. The value of each one was Cr$2,800; in 2020, it would be equivalent to R$1,750,000.

== President of state-owned company, minister and businessman ==
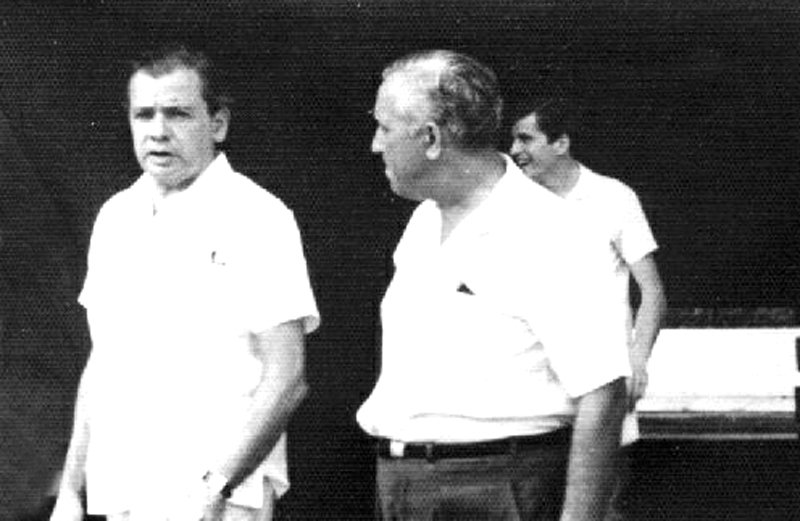
Governor Abreu Sodré (on the left) in Avaré, in the 1960s

In 1980, Abreu Sodré was one of the founders of the Democratic Social Party (PDS), successor to ARENA. Abreu Sodré was also president of Eletropaulo in 1982.

In the Nova República, Abreu Sodré was Minister of Foreign Affairs during most of José Sarney's presidency (1986–1990), being succeeded by Francisco Rezek. During his term as foreign minister, Brazil resumed diplomatic relations with Cuba in 1986, which had been severed since 1964, appointing Ítalo Zappa as ambassador. In 1988, while still a minister and affiliated with the Liberal Front Party (PFL), he supported João Mellão Neto, his nephew, from the Liberal Party (PL), in the municipal elections in São Paulo.

In the last years of his life, he abandoned public life, working as a lawyer and businessman.
