= Pedro Manuel de Toledo =

Brazilian politician

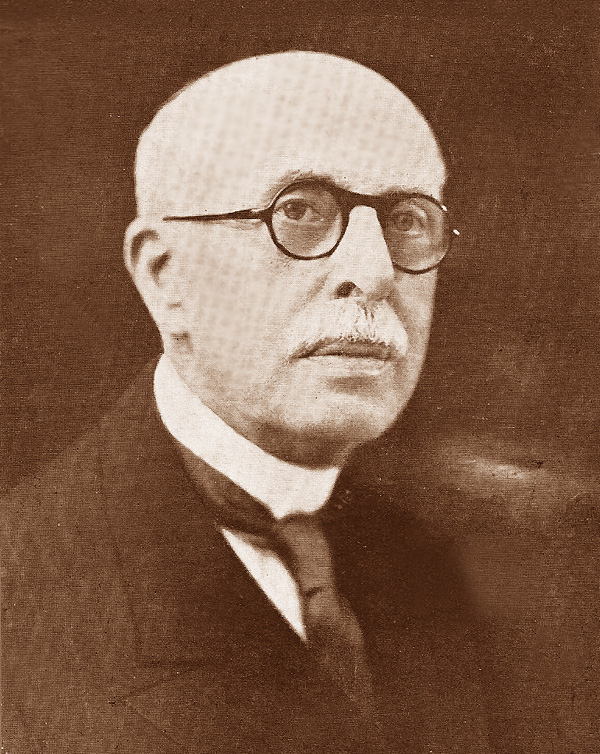
Pedro Manuel de Toledo

Pedro Manuel de Toledo (1860–1935) was a Brazilian politician. He was born in São Paulo. He served in the Cabinet of President Hermes da Fonseca. He died in Rio de Janeiro. Toledo also served as the Governor of São Paulo from March 1932 to October 1932.

Preceded by	Minister of Agriculture of Brazil; 1910–1913	Succeeded by
Preceded by	Minister of Transport of Brazil; 1912	Succeeded by
Preceded by	Governor of São Paulo; 1932	Succeeded by

== See also ==
- Constitutionalist Revolution
