= Democratic Party (Brazil, 1926–1934) =

Political party in Brazil

Democratic Party Partido Democrático
- Founded: February 4, 1926
- Dissolved: January 1, 1934
- Split from: Paulista Republican Party
- Headquarters: São Paulo, Brazil
- Ideology: Republicanism; Federalism; Liberalism
- Political position: Centre-right
- Colors: Blue, White, Red

The Democratic Party (Portuguese: Partido Democrático, PD) was a Brazilian political party, but state character, founded by dissidents of the Paulista Republican Party (PRP) on February 24, 1926, during the Old Republic and was its manifesto signed by 599 signatories. It was a representative organization of the traditional middle class, linked to coffee sectors, but especially the urban.

In May 1926, the Youth Party (Youth Wing of dissenters, who had organized this caption for the federal elections of 1925), also dissident perrepismo, joined the Democratic Party. His most important names were Waldemar Ferreira, José Adriano Marrey Junior, Francisco Morato, Paulo Moraes Barros, Bento de Abreu Sampaio Vidal, Paulo Duarte, Paulo Nogueira Filho, were for the professionals most and young children of coffee farmers, or graduates from traditional families. Few members were industrial.

In the first three months of the legend organization, the party had about 20,000 members; in late 1926, it was possible to compute 50,000. In May 1927, the party had 17 directories in São Paulo and 70 in the interior, high number to 180 in 1927. purposes in July 1927 was created the National Daily official party newspaper, with a circulation of 35,000 copies in December, and 70000 in August 1928.

== Evolution and growing ==
In the 1928 elections, the DP won some seats in the state Assembly and in Congress. For the city of São Paulo, the Party launched the former perrepista José Adriano Marrey Jr., who got 8534 votes against 25,692 for José Pires do Rio, the PRP-government.

In the presidential elections of March 1, 1930, where Vargas is presented as a presidential candidate and Joao Pessoa Paraiba as deputy, in the "Liberal Alliance", which has the support of the São Paulo Democrats. Another major defeat of the Democratic Party, which only gets 10% of São Paulo votes for Vargas.

Mining oligarchies seeking political support after the breakdown of the "coffee with milk" policy, engaged in alliances between oligarchies who were opposed to the political situation. Among these oligarchies that supported Minas Gerais, it can highlight the states of Rio Grande do Sul and Paraíba and some opposition groups from other states, including the Democratic Party, which was active in the "Liberal Alliance".

== Approaching to the PRP and end of the party ==
After the October Revolution, and the disenchantment with Vargas, the PD approached the Paulista Republican Party (PRP), and is a "United Front For São Paulo Kingdom", who served in the campaign for the Constituent Assembly, and became involved with the Revolution constitutionalist 1932, having been many exiled leaders or imprisoned.

In 1933, the college was reorganized and presented joint plate with the Republican Party Paulista and the LEC - Catholic Electoral League, Commercial Association of São Paulo and the Federation of Volunteers to May 3 elections in 1933 to the National Constituent Assembly, called "Single Plate for São Paulo Kingdom", which elected 17 of the 22 deputies, with 80% of votes. The Party of Crop and the Brazilian Socialist Party elected the remaining 5.

The PD elected representatives some jutting out Mr Cardoso de Melo Neto in the constituent work. During the Constituent Assembly, the faction of the National Action PRP old, plus the Democratic Party, and the vast majority of single sheet merged into one acronym: the Constitutionalist Party. In January 1934, the PD IX Congress approved the merger and the end of the party.
