= Armando de Sales Oliveira =

Brazilian politician

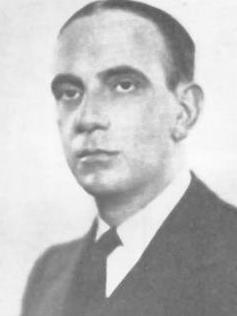
- Oliveira, c. 1933

Governor of São Paulo
- In office 21 August 1933 – 29 December 1936
- Preceded by: Manuel Daltro Filho
- Succeeded by: Henrique Smith Bayma

Personal details
- Born: 24 December 1887
- Died: 17 May 1945 (aged 57) Sao Paulo
- Party: National Democratic Union
- Parent: Fransisco de Oliveira Junior

Armando de Sales Oliveira (24 December 1887 – 17 May 1945) was a Brazilian politician and governor of São Paulo. He was born in São Paulo on 24 December 1887. He was a candidate for the planned election of 1938, though it was never carried out due to the 1937 Brazilian coup d'état. He was later exiled to France in November 1938, and moved to the United States in April 1939. During this time, he published several manifestos against the Estado Novo regime. He moved to Argentina in 1943 and moved back to Brazil when he was granted amnesty by the Brazilian Government in 1945. He was a member of the National Democratic Union for a short time before he died later that year on 17 May in São Paulo.

Preceded by Manuel de Cerqueira Daltro Filho	Governor of São Paulo; 1933–1936	Succeeded by Henrique Smith Bayma
