= João Alberto =

Brazilian politician

João Alberto Lins de Barros
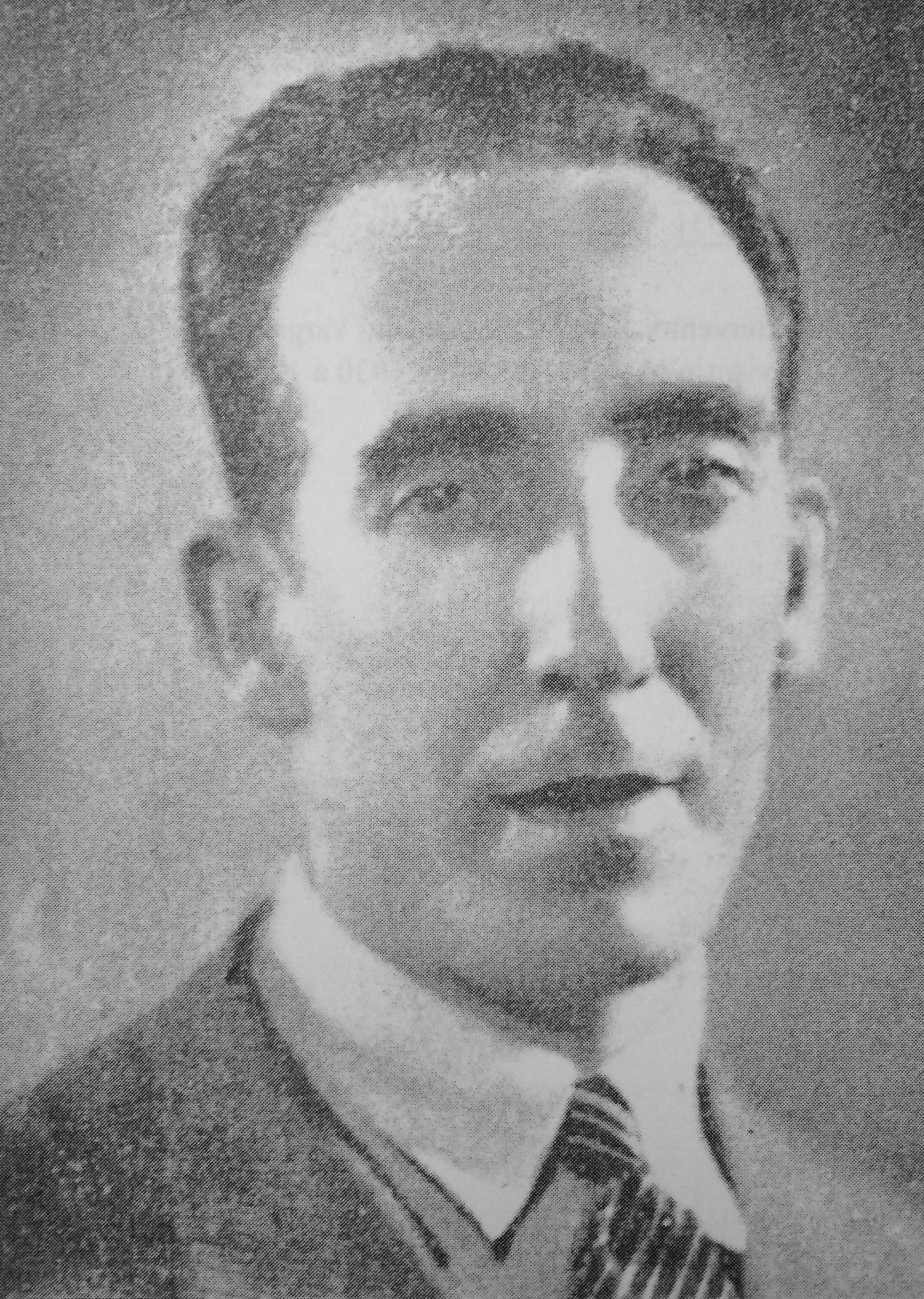

Personal details
- Born: 16 July 1897 Recife, Brazil
- Died: 26 January 1955 (aged 57) Rio de Janeiro, Brazil

João Alberto Lins de Barros (16 July 1897 – 26 January 1955) was a Brazilian politician in the early 20th century. He was appointed by Getúlio Vargas provisional governor in place of the elected governor of São Paulo. Elite paulistas loathed Alberto, resenting his centralization efforts and alarmed by his economic reforms, such as a mere 5% wage increase and some minor distribution of some land to participants in the revolution. Amid threats of revolt, Vargas replaced João Alberto with a civilian from São Paulo, appointed a conservative paulista banker as his minister of finance, and announced a date for the holding of a constituent assembly. The coffee oligarchs were only emboldened, launching the counterrevolutionary revolt in July 1932, which collapsed after some minor, lackadaisical combat.
