= São Paulo Cultural Center =

Public institution in São Paulo, Brazil

- Centro Cultural São Paulo
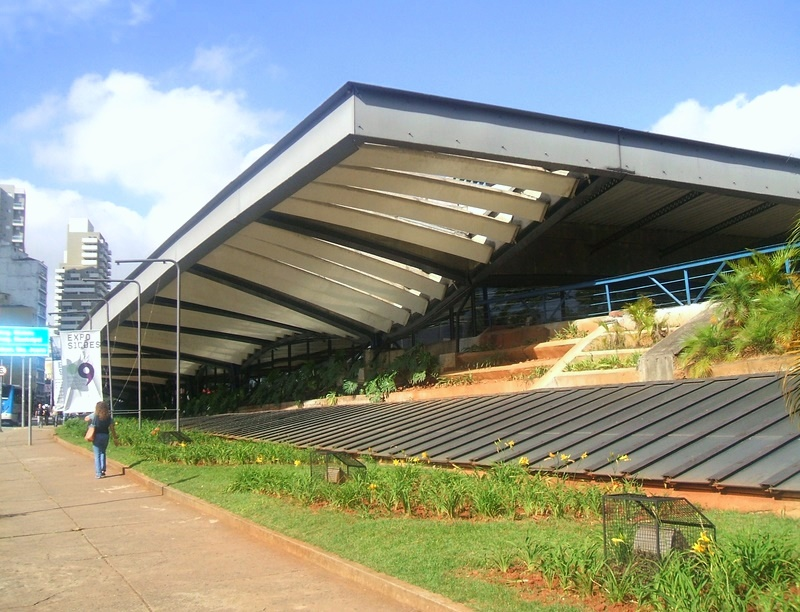
- CCSP seen from Vergueiro street.
- Interactive map of the São Paulo Cultural Center area

General information
- Location: São Paulo, São Paulo; Brazil
- Coordinates: 23°34′15″S 46°38′25″W
- Completed: 1982; 44 years ago

Other information
- Seating capacity: 321

The São Paulo Cultural Center (English: Centro Cultural São Paulo) is a public institution subordinated to the Municipal Department of Culture of São Paulo that includes the Pinacoteca Municipal, the Oneyda Alvarenga Record Collection, the collection of Mário de Andrade's Folklore Research Mission, a set of libraries, exhibition spaces, an area for various courses, theaters and a cinema.

It is considered one of the city's main cultural spaces and one of the first institutions in São Paulo to be considered a "cultural center" in the strict sense of the term. It opened in 1982.

== History ==
=== Background ===
After the creation of the Companhia do Metropolitano de São Paulo in 1968, São Paulo City Hall carried out numerous expropriations for the construction of the North-South Line. Several plots of land were cleared in order to build construction sites and the future Aclimação station (now Vergueiro) through municipal decrees No. 7886 of January 3, 1969 and No. 8656 of February 16, 1970. The METRAG Consortium (made up of Metropolitana, Andrade Gutierrez and Proenge) was hired to build the station and the Operational Control Center. Work began in 1970 and was completed in mid-1974, with the terminal being renamed Vergueiro and inaugurated on February 17, 1975.

=== Nova Vergueiro ===
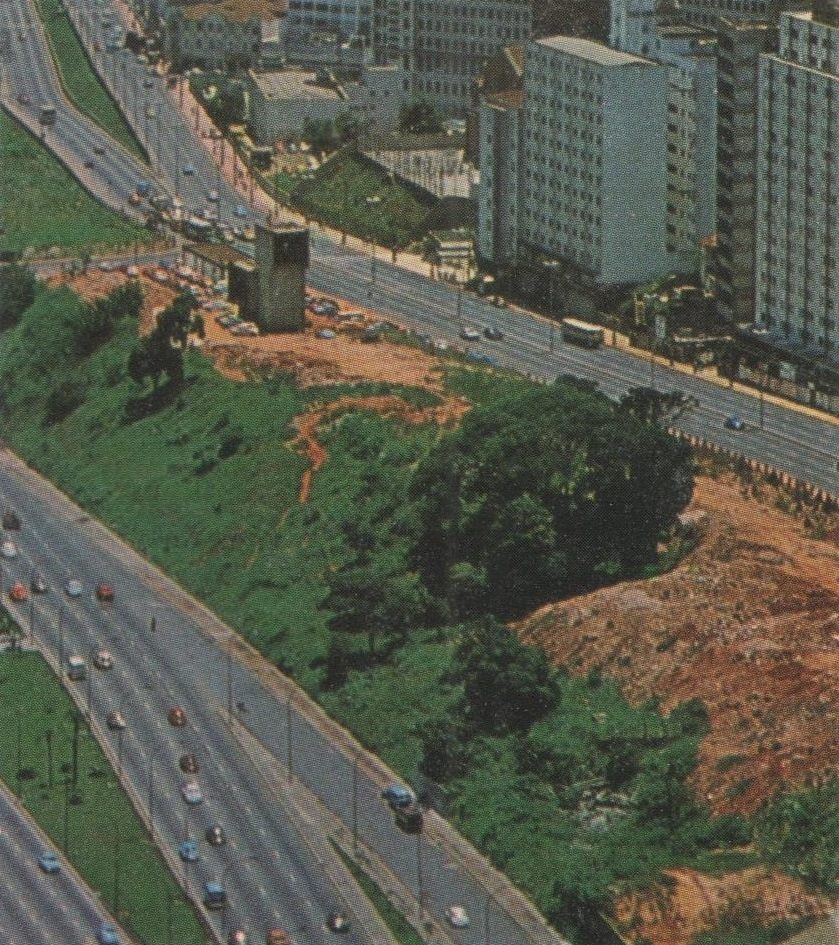
Area of the São Paulo Cultural Center in mid-1978.

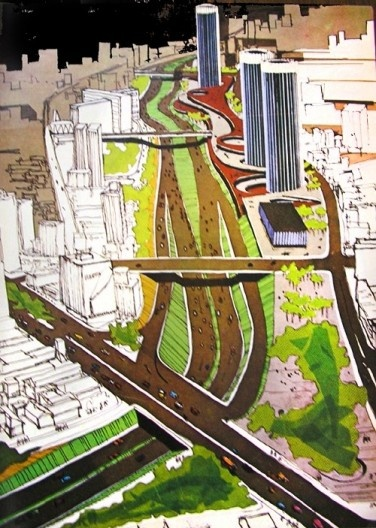
Artistic representation of the Nova Vergueiro project by Emurb technicians, 1974.

During the final stage of construction, the city government began to study a suitable destination for the areas left over from the building sites. As a result, the Empresa Municipal de Urbanização de São Paulo (Emurb) launched a project to redevelop the areas called Nova Vergueiro. In order to implement the idea, Emurb has prepared a proposal for a partnership with the private sector. The municipality would transfer the land for a pre-designed complex and, in exchange, a consortium of companies would detail this project, build public and private premises and green and leisure areas for the community in the same area and operate part of the business for a certain period of time.

In July 1974, Mayor Miguel Colasuonno launched a tender for the construction of two office towers, in which three consortia presented themselves: Construtora Adolfo Lindemberg S/A, CBPO-Formaespaço S/A and Guarantã Servlease S/A - Prourb. After the bids were announced, the winning consortium was Guarantã Servlease S/A - Prourb, which hired architects Roger Zmekhol and Sidinei Rodrigues, who designed two 105-meter-high towers as well as a shopping center, library, hotel and a terrace with landscaped slabs, an underground garage and a footbridge over 23 de Maio Avenue, linking Santo Agostinho Square to the Beneficência Portuguesa de São Paulo. The project had an estimated cost of 700 million cruzeiros and was due to be completed in five years.

Before work had even begun, Colasuonno left the mayor's office and the new mayor, Olavo Setúbal, decided to re-examine the project. After much criticism of the project (which also threatened the expansion of Paulista Avenue), Setúbal annulled the tender on July 2, 1975, alleging breach of contract by the winning consortium. Prourb went to court and the city was forced to compensate them.

=== New Public Library ===
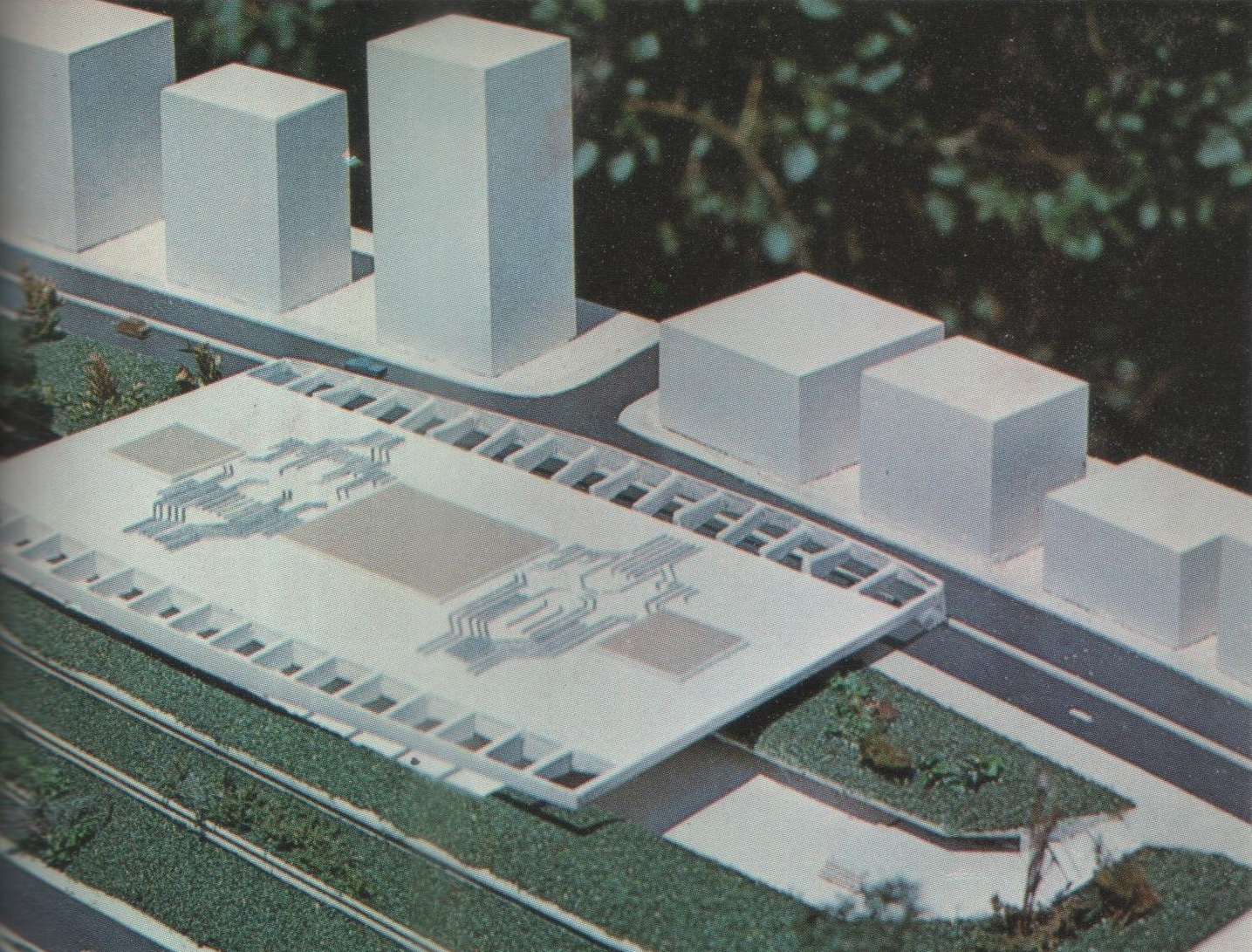
Partial view of the first model of the New Public Library, 1978. The project served as the basis for the future São Paulo Cultural Center.

In the 1970s, the Mário de Andrade Library, the largest and most important in São Paulo, was overcrowded. Without space to store new books, the place declined, transferring part of its collection to neighborhood libraries, such as the one in Santo Amaro. A project to build an extension to the library had been discussed since the beginning of the decade. During the cancellation of the Nova Vergueiro project, the Setúbal administration envisioned a public park for the project area. The park ended up being shelved and, in July 1975, the land was chosen for an extension of the Mário de Andrade Library.

After a competitive bidding process, São Paulo City Hall hired architects Eurico Prado Lopes and Luiz Benedito de Castro Telles to design the new library, using part of the 300,000 square meter area of the now-defunct Nova Vergueiro project, located to the north of the subway station of the same name. The basic idea was to build a space capable of holding 1.5 million books and accommodating up to 1,300 people simultaneously. The project was divided into three stages: 27,000 square meters were to be delivered in 1978, 30,000 square meters in 1983 and completion in 1990.

=== São Paulo Cultural Center ===
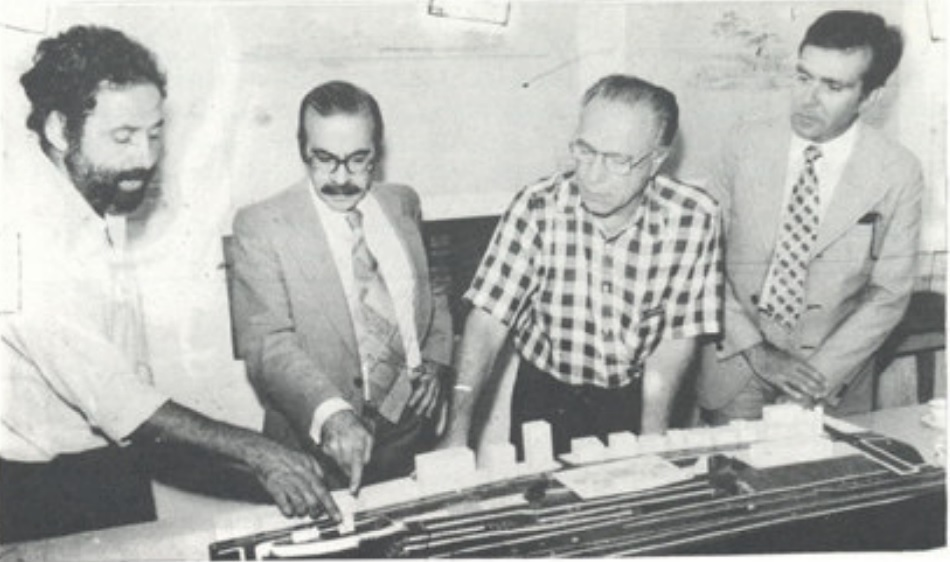
Architect Eurico Prado Lopes (left) presenting the model of the São Paulo Cultural Center to municipal secretaries Mário Chamie (culture) and Paulo Gomes Machado (works), 1979.

Due to budget problems, construction only began in 1978, with the earthworks being carried out. Método, Maubertec and Sul Americana de Engenharia S/A (SADE) were contracted to design and build the premises. After Setúbal's term ended, the city government of São Paulo was assumed by Reynaldo de Barros, who modified the project at the request of his culture secretary Mário Chamie. Instead of concentrating just an extension of the Mário de Andrade Library, the project was redesigned based on the Centre Pompidou in Paris. Construction of the building began in 1981, financed by the Nossa Caixa bank, and its first stage was completed in 1982. The São Paulo Cultural Center was opened on the last day of Reinaldo de Barros' term, unfinished, at noon on May 13, 1982.

The opening was limited because the section of the building facing Vergueiro Street still didn't have a hydrant system, part of the finishing of the light fittings hadn't been installed and there were flaws in the floors and remnants of construction work in some places. Two theaters (one of which was an arena theater), a cinema, an auditorium, a foyer, a pinacoteca with a collection of 1,600 works and an internal garden were delivered. The library, the main facility, was still under construction. In all, a 46,500 square meter building with four floors was constructed at an initial cost of 3 billion cruzeiros.

Despite Secretary Chamie's promises that the library would be inaugurated after a month or two, it only happened on March 6, 1983, by Mayor Antônio Salim Curiati. On the same day, the other facilities were given their names: Adoniran Barbosa (arena theater), Jardel Filho (Italian stage theater), Lima Barreto (cinema) and Paulo Emílio Sales Gomes (auditorium). The Sérgio Milliet Library was the first in the city to have a search and cataloguing system computerized by PRODAM. Initially, the fifty thousand works available could not be borrowed. Moved by the tribute to Sérgio Milliet, his family donated part of his personal library to the institution.

The architect Eurico Prado Lopes, who worked hard to get the project completed, was unable to contemplate it because he died on April 12, 1985, at the age of 45; his memorial service was held in one of the cultural center's libraries. Some time later, Lopes' friends and colleagues contacted the authorities to have the project completed. In 1986, it attracted only 5,000 visitors a day and was still unfinished, with execution problems that architect Telles and the city's technical staff tried to correct. The Alfredo Volpi Library was inaugurated on August 20, 1992, by Mayor Luíza Erundina. Only in 2004, with the construction of the garden, named Eurico Prado Lopes, and access to the Vergueiro metro station, the last facilities were completed.

== Project ==
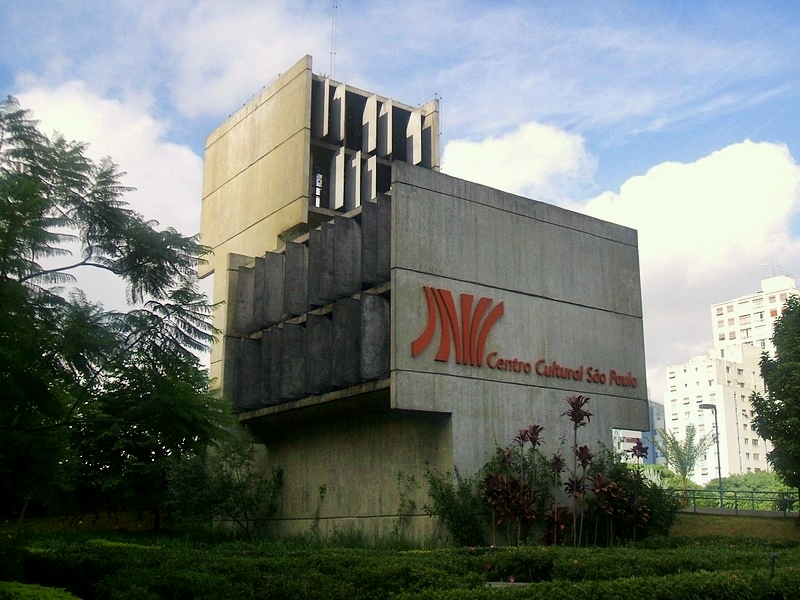
Detail of the reinforced concrete building and logo inspired by the internal metal structure.

The project by Eurico Prado Lopes and Luiz Telles is considered one of the most significant in São Paulo. The structural solution is complex, using reinforced concrete and iron. The architectural design aimed for horizontality, favored the fluidity of the large spaces and included several accesses.

The cultural center's logo was created by visual artist Emilie Chamie, wife of Mário Chamie, inspired by the structure of the building.

== Criticism ==
On September 28, 2014, Folha de S. Paulo published the results of the team's evaluation of the sixty largest theaters in the city of São Paulo. The venue was awarded three stars, a "regular" grade, with the consensus: "In the Jardel Filho room, the space is simple, and the seats are not comfortable. There is sound leakage, which disrupts the performances, and the space for wheelchair users is not well situated. There are good theater and dance productions on the program. The [ticket] prices are attractive (...) The advisory says that the CCSP is working to resolve the two issues: the sound leak and the location of the area for wheelchair users."

== Activities ==
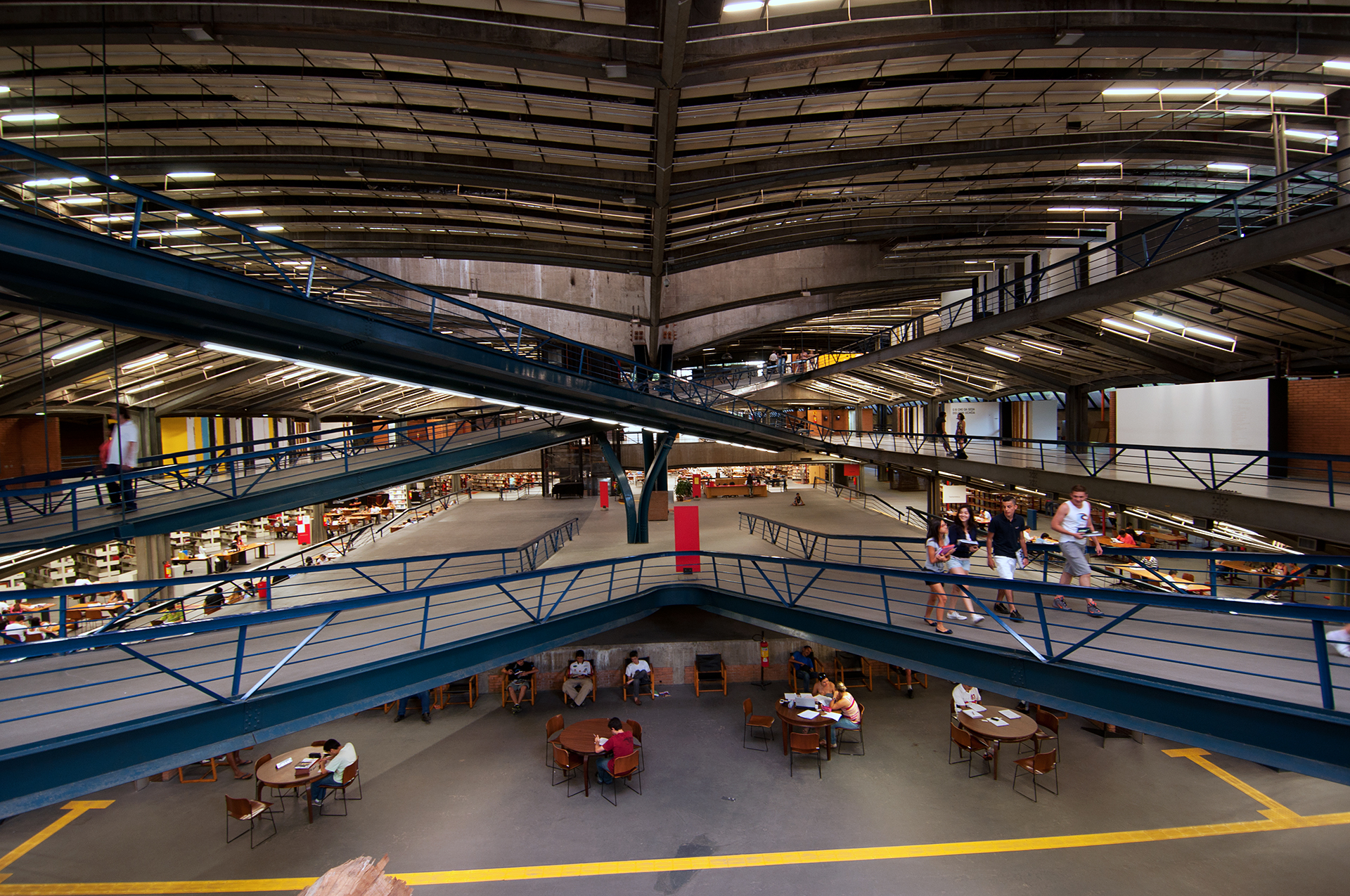
Internal view of the CCSP.

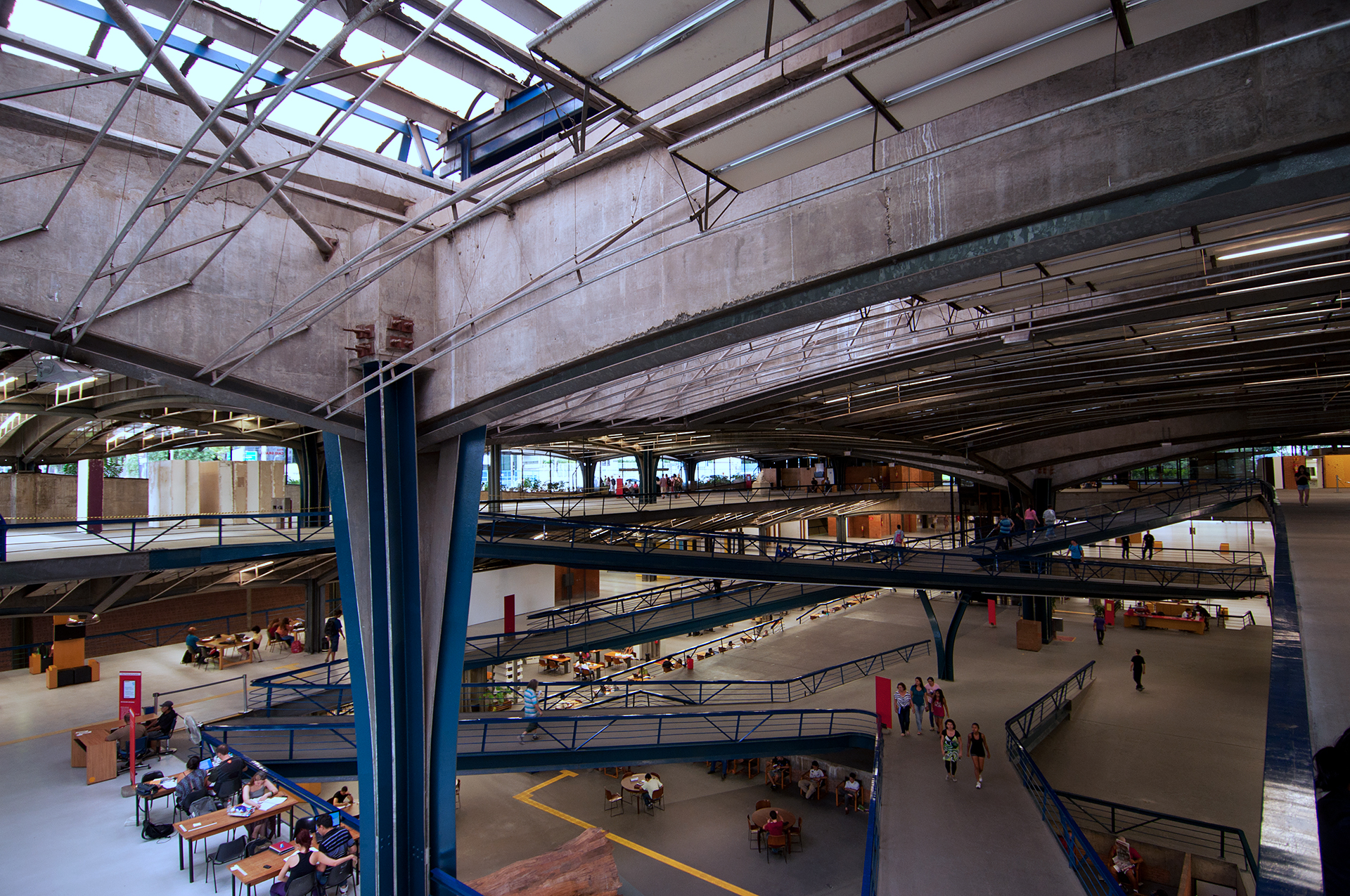
Internal view of the CCSP.

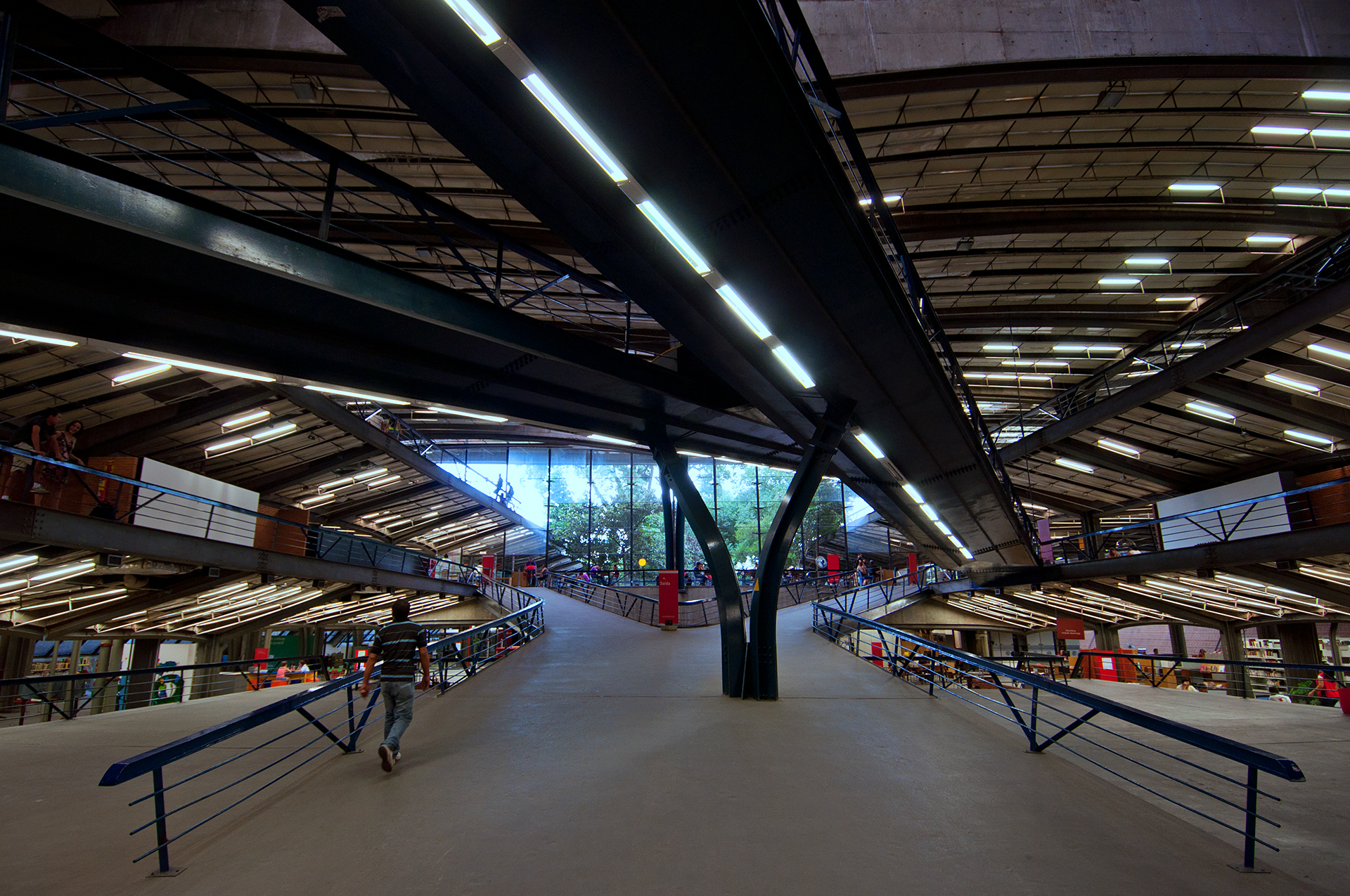
Internal view of the CCSP.

In addition to the libraries, the space offers various cultural activities such as film screenings and theater performances. There is also Dance Week, which brings dance shows to the site for several weeks of the year, and other projects such as concerts of various types of music aimed at bringing culture to the population.

In addition to the activities provided by the cultural center, many young people get together to practice street dance in groups or to study and play board games at the tables outside the library.

== Accessibility ==
The cultural center has a free access program, where people with disabilities and reduced mobility can easily attend all the activities the space provides, since the staff is trained to help them. In addition, the CCSP's facilities are accessible to wheelchair users, the hearing impaired and the visually impaired. The center also provides a place to store bicycles.

== Library ==
The cultural center has several libraries inside: the Sérgio Milliet, the second largest in the city; the Alfredo Volpi, with a catalog on fine arts, photography and architecture; the Gibiteca, which besides comic books offers lectures, exhibitions and comic book workshops; the Louis Braille, accessible to the visually and hearing impaired as it contains audio books and books in braille, as well as computers with braille technology; the Children's Reading Room, with articles on contemporary Brazilian art; and the City Art Collection, which contains works by Tarsila do Amaral.

== See also ==
- Tourism in the city of São Paulo
- Cultural center
- Pinacoteca do Estado de São Paulo
