= Francisco Altino Lima =

Brazilian politician (1924–1989)

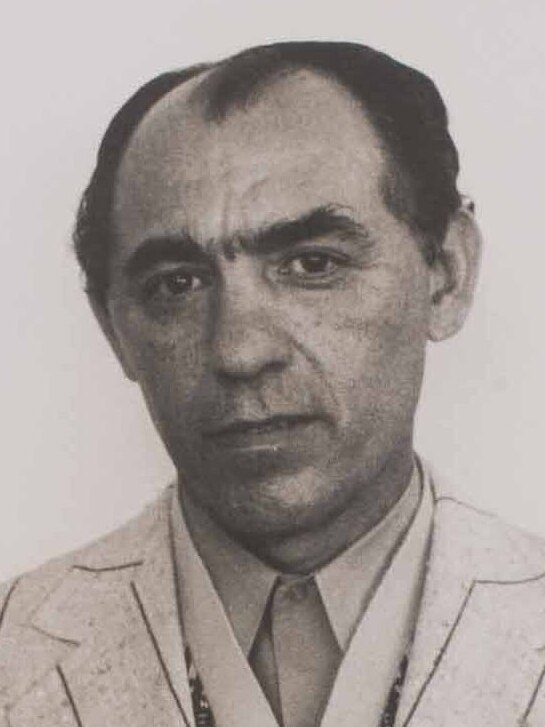
- Lima in the 1970s

Mayor of São Paulo
- Acting
- In office 15 March 1983 – 10 May 1983
- Preceded by: Antônio Salim Curiati
- Succeeded by: Mário Covas

City Councillor of São Paulo
- In office 1982 – 15 May 1989

Personal details
- Born: 29 January 1924 Saboeiro, Ceará, Brazil
- Died: 15 May 1989 (aged 65) São Paulo, Brazil
- Party: PMDB
- Education: Pontifical Catholic University of São Paulo

Francisco Altino Lima (29 January 1924 – 15 May 1989) was a Brazilian politician who was a councilor in the city council of São Paulo, at one point serving as council president. He served as the acting mayor of the city from 15 March to 10 May 1983.

Born in Saboeiro, Ceará, Lima moved to São Paulo as a teenager. He worked at Light S.A. and at Telecomunicações de São Paulo until he retired from the latter. He graduated with a law degree from the Pontifical Catholic University of São Paulo in 1972.

In 1976, he entered the political scene of São Paulo, influenced by city councilmember José Freitas Nobre. He was elected as a city councilor in 1982, at one point becoming council president. He went on to serve as acting mayor for a brief period in 1983 due to the lack of a deputy mayor position, succeeding Antônio Salim Curiati. He was succeeded by Mário Covas. One of the few acts that were enacted during his time as mayor was the renaming of Estrada do Lejeado in the São Miguel Paulista district to Avenida Nordestina. After his term as acting mayor ended, he resumed his position as council president until the end of his mandate in that position on 31 January 1985. He was reelected in 1988, but died while serving his term on 15 May 1989.

Political offices
Preceded by Antônio Salim Curiati	Mayor of São Paulo (acting); 1983	Succeeded by Mário Covas
