= José Vicente Faria Lima =

Brazilian politician (1909–1969)

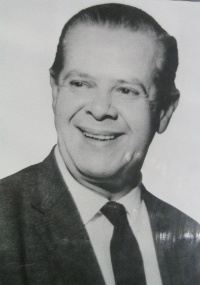

Mayor of São Paulo
- In office 8 April 1965 – 7 April 1969
- Preceded by: Francisco Prestes Maia
- Succeeded by: Paulo Maluf

President of the Brazilian Development Bank
- In office February 1961 – September 1961
- President: Jânio Quadros
- Preceded by: Lúcio Martins Meira
- Succeeded by: Leocádio de Almeida Antunes

Personal details
- Born: 7 October 1909 Rio de Janeiro, Federal District, Brazil
- Died: 4 September 1969 (aged 59) Rio de Janeiro, Guanabara, Brazil
- Party: UDN (Until 1965); ARENA (1965–69)
- Occupation: Military engineer

Military service
- Allegiance: Brazil
- Branch/service: Brazilian Air Force
- Years of service: 1930–1954
- Rank: Lieutenant-brigadier

José Vicente de Faria Lima (7 October 1909 — 4 September 1969) was a Brazilian military engineer and later politician.

== Biography ==
Lima was born in Rio de Janeiro.

At the age of 21 Faria Lima started his military career in the Brazilian Air Force. There, he acquired the experience needed to join the Brazilian Mail Airlines, where he met his companion Eduardo Gomes, with whom he flew across the country. At the Brazilian Air Force, Faria Lima graduated as a military pilot, observer and aeronautical engineer, specializing in engineering at the Superior College of Aeronautics in France. By 1958 he held the rank of Brigadeiro do Ar.

While working as a technical assistant for Minister Salgado Filho, he helped create the Ministry of Aeronautics. Faria Lima was also chief of the Brazilian Aeronautical Commission in the United States and commander of the Campo de Marte in São Paulo. He was also invited by Jânio Quadros to become the president of VASP, a national airline company.

In March 1965, Faria Lima was elected mayor of São Paulo. His administration distinguished itself by the number of construction projects initiated, among the most notable were: Marginais Tietê and Pinheiros, Avenida Sumaré, Radial Leste, 23 de Maio and Rubem Berta. During his administration, the tram service discontinued its operation while the subway system, the "Metrô," was initiated. His term also contributed to improvements in the health system, education, and social services of the city.

Government offices
Preceded by Lúcio Martins Meira	President of the Brazilian Development Bank; 1961	Succeeded by Leocádio de Almeida Antunes
Political offices
Preceded by Francisco Prestes Maia	Mayor of São Paulo; 1965–1969	Succeeded by Paulo Maluf
