= Pacaembu Stadium =

Football stadium in Brazil

- Estádio do Pacaembu
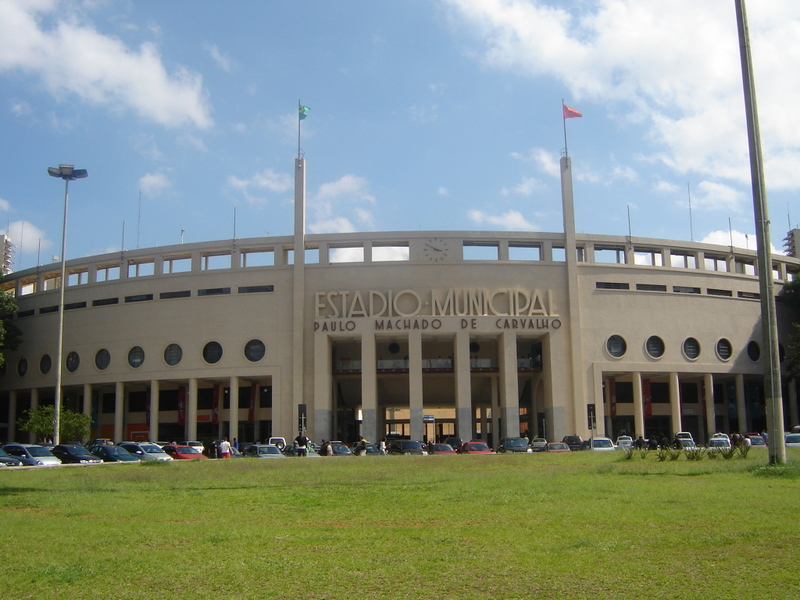
- Sisbrace
- Interactive map of Pacaembu Stadium
- Full name: Mercado Livre Arena Pacaembu
- Former names: Estádio Municipal (1940–1961); Estádio Municipal Paulo Machado de Carvalho (1961–2024)
- Location: São Paulo, SP, Brazil
- Coordinates: 23°32′55.1″S 46°39′54.4″W
- Owner: São Paulo Municipality
- Operator: Allegra Pacaembu
- Capacity: 40,199
- Event: Art Deco
- Surface: Natural grass
- Record attendance: 71,281 (Corinthians 3–3 São Paulo, 24 May 1942)
- Field size: 105 by 68 metres (114.8 yd × 74.4 yd)
- Public transit: Clínicas

Construction
- Groundbreaking: 17 September 1938
- Built: 1938–1940
- Opened: 27 April 1940
- Renovated: 2007, 2021–present
- Expanded: 1958 and 1970
- Architect: Escritório Técnico Ramos de Azevedo - Severo e Villares

Tenants
- Corinthians (1940–2014); Palmeiras (2010–2014)

The Estádio do Pacaembu (Portuguese pronunciation: [isˈtadʒiu du pakaẽˈbu]; lit. 'Pacaembu Stadium', named after the Pacaembu neighbourhood), currently known as Mercado Livre Arena Pacaembu for sponsorship reasons, is an association football stadium in São Paulo, Brazil. Located in the Pacaembu neighbourhood, it is owned by Municipal Prefecture of São Paulo.

The stadium was inaugurated on 27 April 1940, in the presence of the Brazilian President Getúlio Vargas, the interventor Adhemar de Barros and the mayor of São Paulo, Prestes Maia. The stadium used to hold 40,199 people and its pitch dimensions are 104 m of length by 70 m of width, but is currently undergoing a renovation that will reduce capacity.

Pacaembu is frequently used to host home matches of the Big 4 football clubs of the State of São Paulo, of which Corinthians, Palmeiras and São Paulo are based in the capital city itself, and only Santos is based in a different city. This occurs when the clubs must cede their own stadiums for concerts, or when reforms are being made. In the case of Santos, Pacaembu is also used when the club requires a site with a higher seating capacity for a particular match, given the low capacity of their own stadium.

The stadium was listed by the São Paulo state Council for the Defense of Historical, Archaeological, Artistic and Tourist Heritage (CONDEPHAAT) in 1998 due to its Art Deco style, characteristic of the period in which it was built.

== History ==
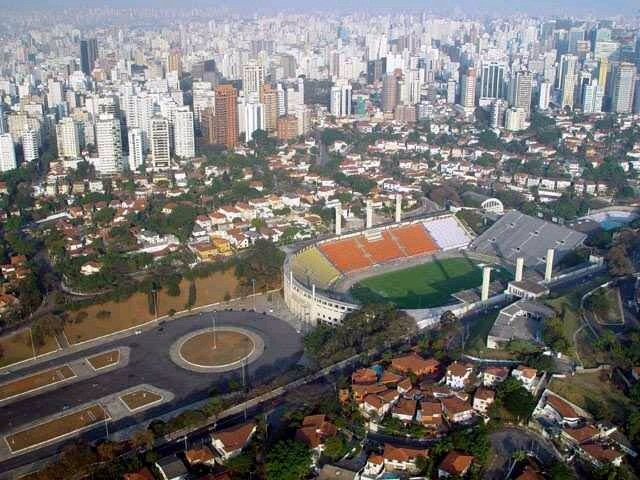
Aerial view of the Stadium and Charles Miller Square

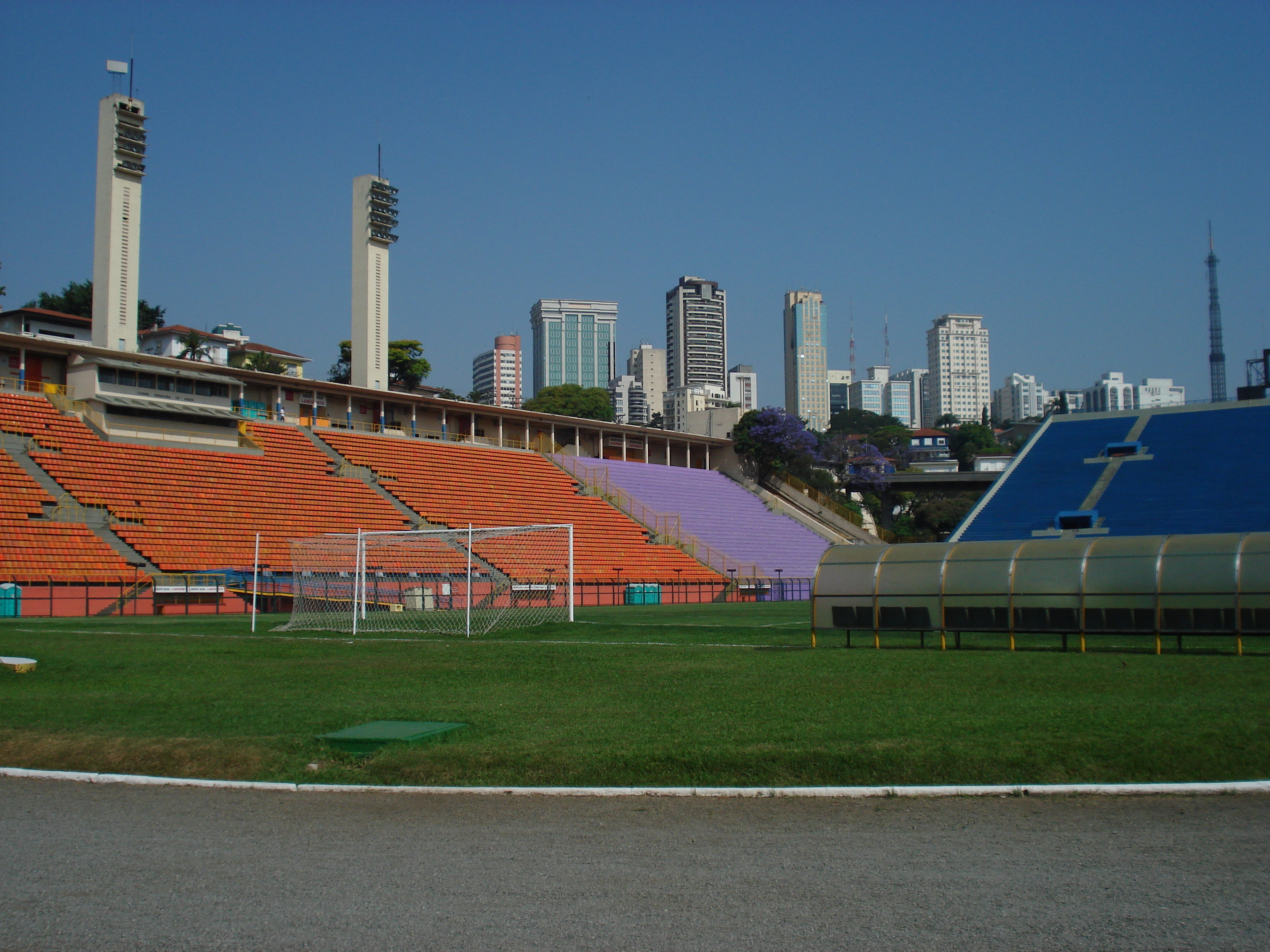
Interior view of the pitch and stands

The first match ever played at Pacaembu Stadium took place on 27 April 1940, when Palestra Itália (now known as SE Palmeiras) defeated Coritiba, 6–2. The first goal in the stadium was scored by Coritiba's Zequinha. Later that day, Corinthians beat Atlético Mineiro 4–2 on the same ground. Both matches were part of the Taça Cidade de São Paulo competition.

On 4 May 1940, the Taça Cidade de São Paulo Final was played at Pacaembu Stadium. Palestra Itália beat Corinthians 2–1, becoming the first club to win a competition at the stadium.

The stadium's attendance record currently stands at 71,281, set on 24 May 1942, when Corinthians and São Paulo drew 3–3.

On 20 September 1942, Palmeiras played its first match after changing its name from Palestra Itália. Palmeiras beat São Paulo 3–1, winning that year's Campeonato Paulista.

In 1945, São Paulo beat Jabaquara 12–1 at Pacaembu Stadium. This remains the highest-scoring match in the stadium's history.

In 2005, the stadium served as the first "Pit Stop" of The Amazing Race 9.

On 11 May 2007, Pope Benedict XVI met with the youth of Brazil at the stadium as a part of his Apostolic Journey to Brazil on the occasion of the Fifth General Conference of the Bishops of Latin America and the Caribbean.

Until the opening of Arena Corinthians in 2014, Corinthians played most of their home matches at Pacaembu, since their original stadium did not meet the requirements for hosting official football matches.

Between July 2010 and November 2014, the stadium was the temporary home ground of Palmeiras while Allianz Parque was under construction.

On 27 January 2025, the stadium reopened to the public after a 40-month renovation. The most notable change to the stadium was with the demolition of the south stand, with a five-story building constructed in its place.

== 1950 FIFA World Cup ==
Six 1950 FIFA World Cup matches were played at Estádio do Pacaembu, which were:

Date	Time	Team #1	Res.	Team #2	Round	Spectators
25 June 1950	15.00	Sweden	3–2	Italy	Group 3	~50,000
28 June 1950	15.00	Brazil	2–2	Switzerland	Group 1	~42,000
2 July 1950	15.00	Italy	2–0	Paraguay	Group 3	~26,000
9 July 1950	15.00	Uruguay	2–2	Spain	Final Round	~44,000
13 July 1950	15.00	Uruguay	3–2	Sweden	Final Round	~8,000
16 July 1950	15.00	Sweden	3–1	Spain	Final Round	~11,000

== Museum ==
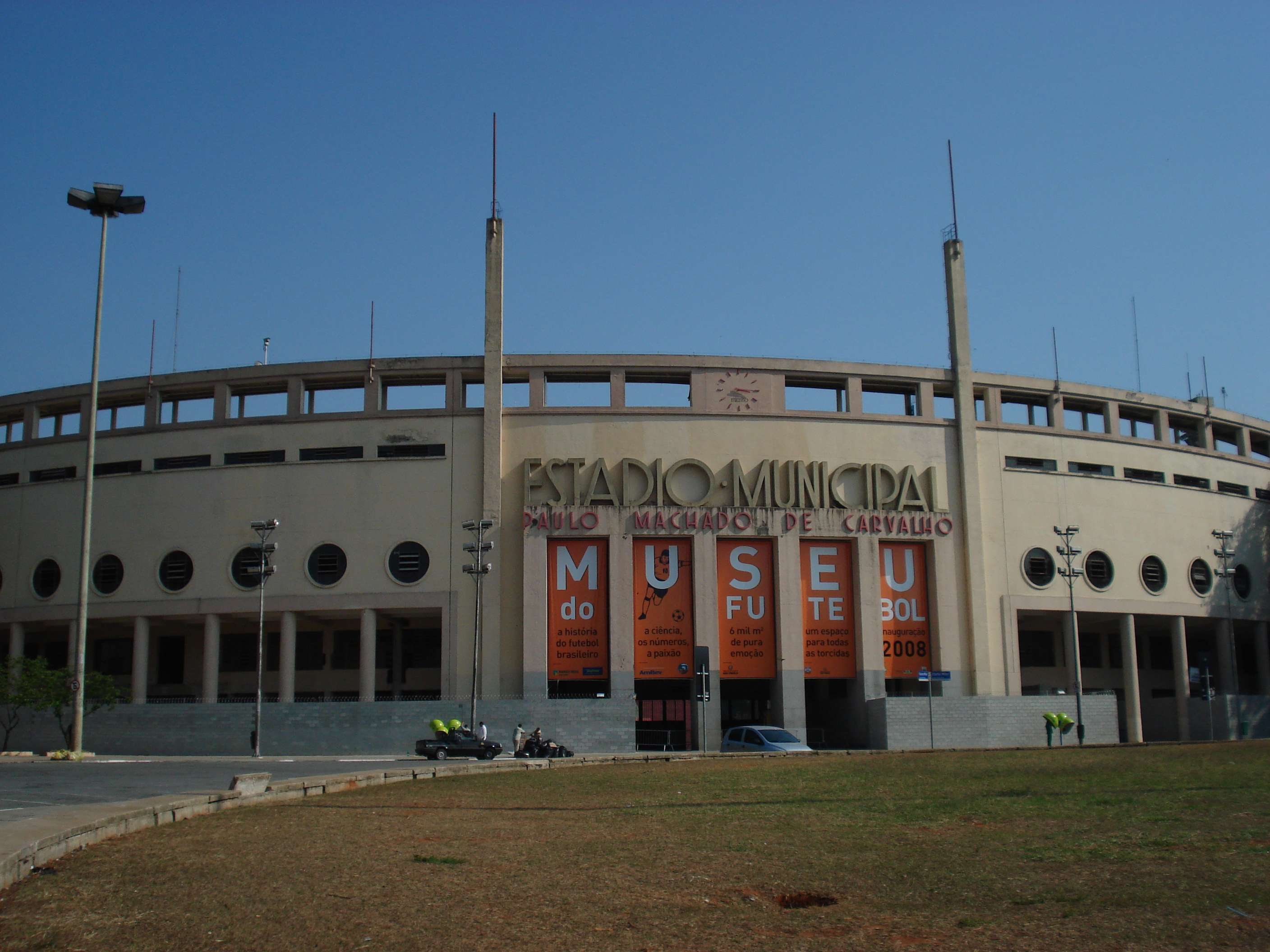
Pacaembu's main entrance displaying the Museum outdoor

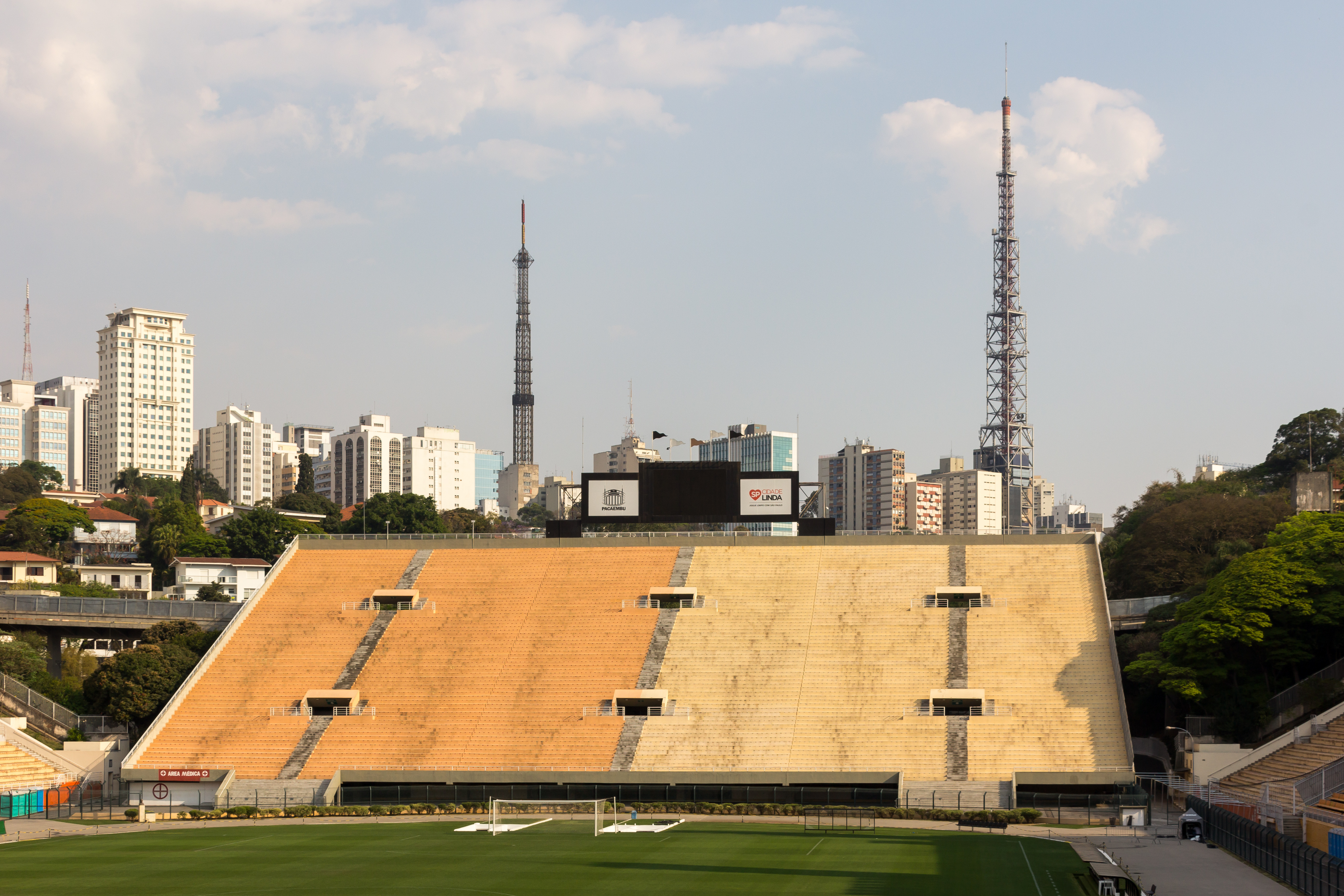
The now-demolished 'slide' at the stadium

On 29 September 2008, the Museu do Futebol (Museum of Football) was inaugurated. It was created to tell the history of Brazilian football. The museum covers 6,900 square metres (1.7 acres), it was built at a cost of R$32.5 million, and is located below the stadium's bleachers. The 680 workers hired to build the museum completed the construction in 13 months.
