= Salgado Filho (disambiguation) =

Salgado Filho is a municipality in Brazil.

Salgado Filho may also refer to:

- Salgado Filho, Santa Maria
- Salgado Filho International Airport
- Senador Salgado Filho
- Joaquim Pedro Salgado Filho
