= Francisco Prestes Maia =

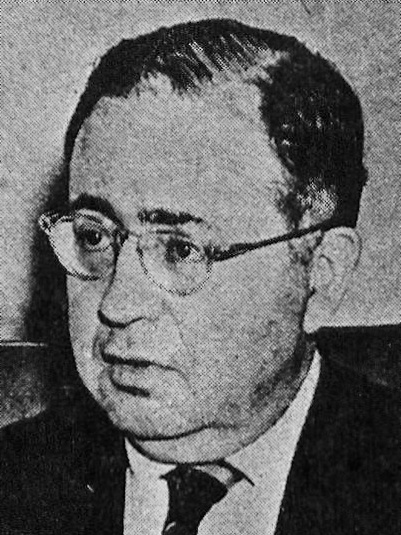

Mayor of São Paulo
- In office 1 May 1938 – 10 November 1945
- Preceded by: Fábio da Silva Prado
- Succeeded by: Abraão Ribeiro
- In office 8 April 1961 – 7 April 1965
- Vice Mayor: José Freitas Nobre
- Preceded by: Adhemar de Barros
- Succeeded by: José Vicente Faria Lima

Personal details
- Born: Francisco Prestes Maia; 19 March 1896 Amparo, São Paulo, Brazil
- Died: 26 April 1965 (aged 69) São Paulo, Brazil
- Party: UDN (until 1965)
- Profession: Civil engineer; architect

Francisco Prestes Maia (Portuguese pronunciation: [fɾɐ̃ˈsisku ˈpɾɛstʃiz ˈmajjɐ]) (19 March 1896 – 26 April 1965) was a Brazilian architect, civil engineer, urban planner, and professor, who served three terms as mayor of the city of São Paulo.

He is the Founder of the 48th chair of the Brazilian Academy of Fine Arts.

== Biography ==
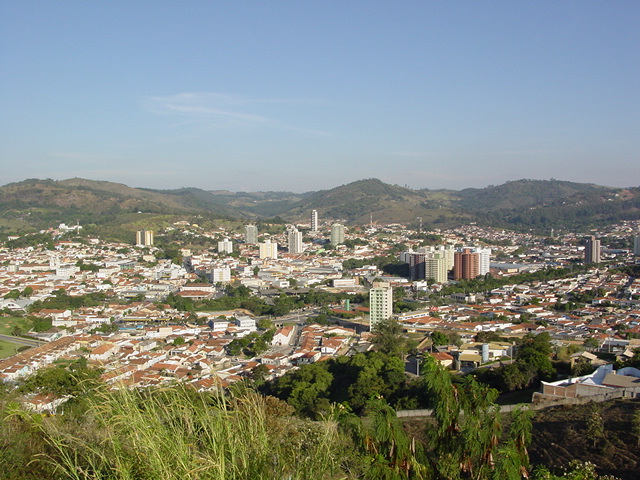
Amparo, São Paulo — birthplace of Prestes Maia

Francisco Prestes Maia was born to Manuel Azevedo Maia and Carolina Prestes on March 19, 1896, in Amparo, São Paulo, a small town 120 km north of the capital city.

In 1917, Prestes Maia completed his engineering and architecture degree at the POLI, Polytechnic School of São Paulo (Portuguese: Escola Politécnica da Universidade de São Paulo). In 1918, he set up a real estate office and also began working for the São Paulo state government.

From 1924 to 1927, Prestes Maia taught architectural drawing courses part-time at his alma mater, POLI. He was promoted to full professor in 1927 and taught for another ten years. In 1937, he left the university in order to be able to continue working for the city.

From 1926 to 1930, he served as the city's Secretary of Transportation and Public Works. In 1930, Prestes Maia published his “Study for a Plan of Avenues for the City of São Paulo” (Estudo de um Plano de Avenidas para a Cidade de São Paulo). The Plano de Avenidas was given an award at the Fourth Pan-American Congress of Architects at Rio de Janeiro in July 1930.

He met Maria de Lourdes Costa Cabral e Abreu in 1930 in Rio de Janeiro, where she was on tour with an opera troupe from Portugal. The couple where not able to live together until the death of Prestes Maia's mother in 1935, since Maria had been divorced and Carolina Prestes did not approve of their relationship. The two were not able to officially marry until late in his life, given that divorce was still illegal in Brazil and her ex-husband was still alive. They had no children.

In 1938 Prestes Maia was named mayor of São Paulo for the first time by Ademar de Barros, the interventor for the state of São Paulo at the time. He would be appointed again by Lucas Nogueira Garcez in 1942, immediately following his first term. After completing his second term, he left office on November 10, 1945 — roughly the same time that the same time that the Estado Novo was ending and democracy was restored to the country.

Prestes Maia had two unsuccessful bids for political office following the overthrow of Getúlio Vargas.

In 1961, Prestes Maia was finally elected by popular vote and began his third term as mayor of São Paulo in 1961.

Francisco Prestes Maia died in São Paulo on 26 April 1965.

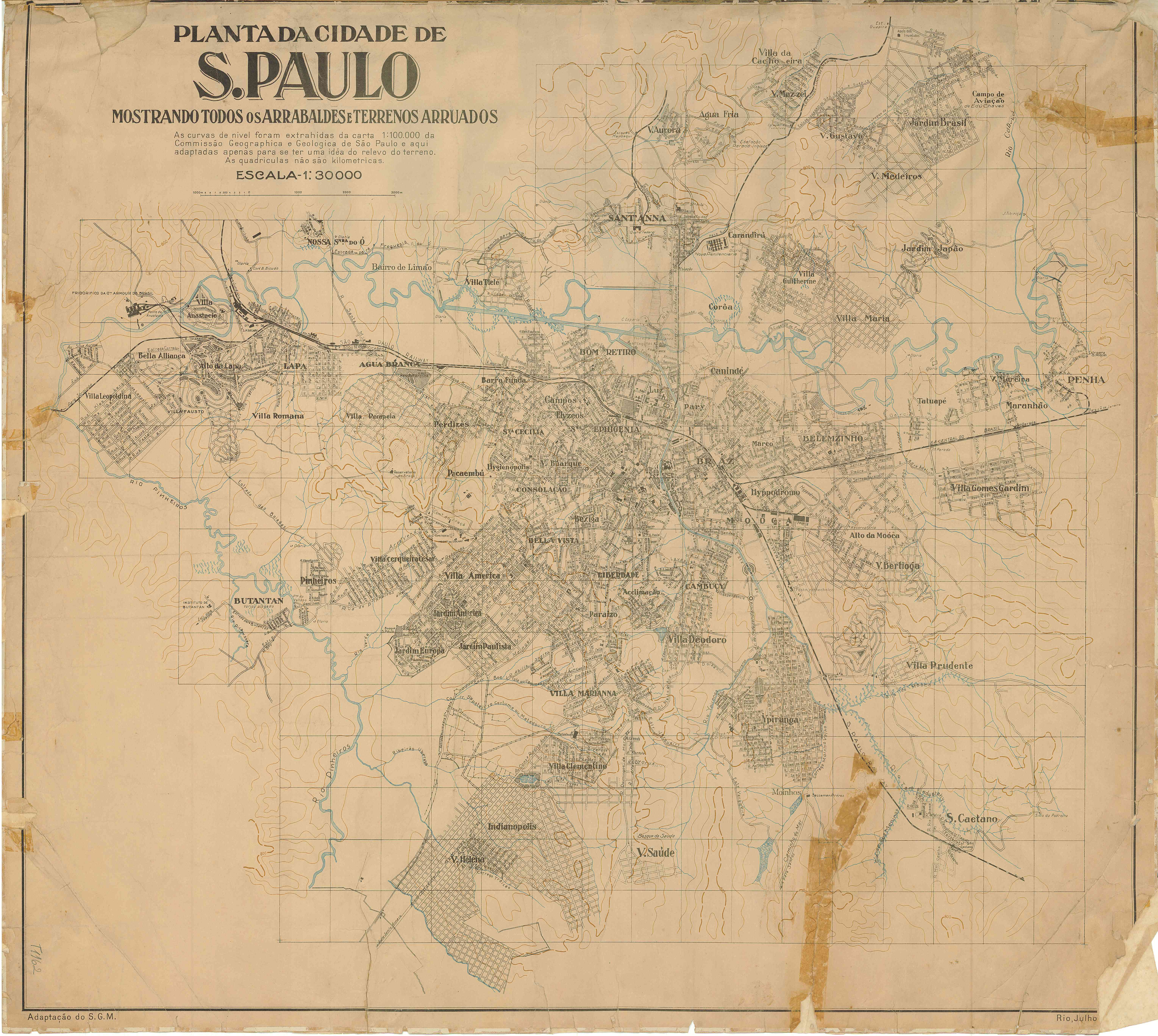
Map of São Paulo (1924)

Prestes Maia and his Plano de Avenidas had a lasting impact on the geography of São Paulo.

On August 27, 1997, the city of São Paulo passed a law (Lei nº 12.443) creating the Prestes Maia Urbanism Award (Prêmio Prestes Maia de Urbanismo) to be awarded every four years with the idea of proposing initiatives in urban planning and engineering. The Prestes Maia Award has only been given twice, in 1998 and in 2006.

== Toponyms ==
=== Roadways ===
==== Avenida Prestes Maia ====
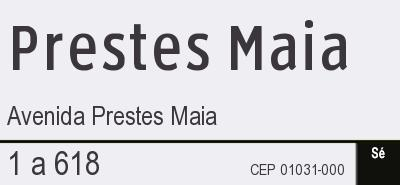
São Paulo street sign

Francisco Prestes Maia has many streets named for him throughout his home state of São Paulo. The largest of these is Avenida Prestes Maia, an arterial expressway in downtown São Paulo that is part of the North-South Corredor (Corredor Norte-Sul).

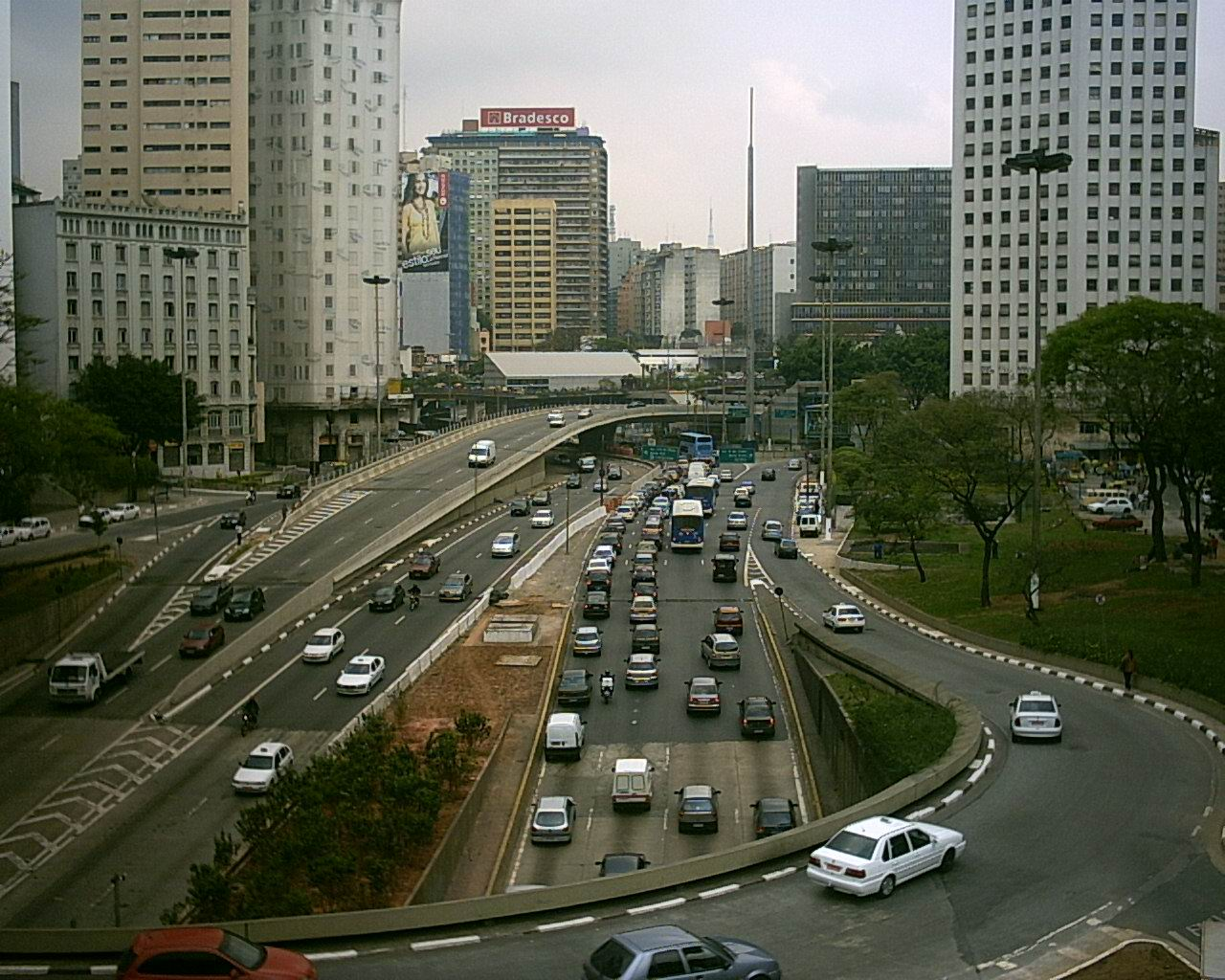
Traffic on Avenida Prestes Maia in central São Paulo

Many municipalities in Greater São Paulo — as well as some in the so-called interior of the state — have at least one street named, Avenida Prestes Maia or some derivation thereof, e.g., Avenida Francisco Prestes Maia, Avenida Doutor Francisco Prestes Maia, etc.:

- São Paulo
- Amparo
- Campinas
- ABC Region
  - Santo André
  - São Bernardo do Campo
  - Diadema
- Caraguatatuba
- Panorama
- Araçatuba
- Votuporanga
- Osasco
- Carapicuíba
- Guarujá
- São Vicente

==== Rodovia Prestes Maia (BR-101) ====
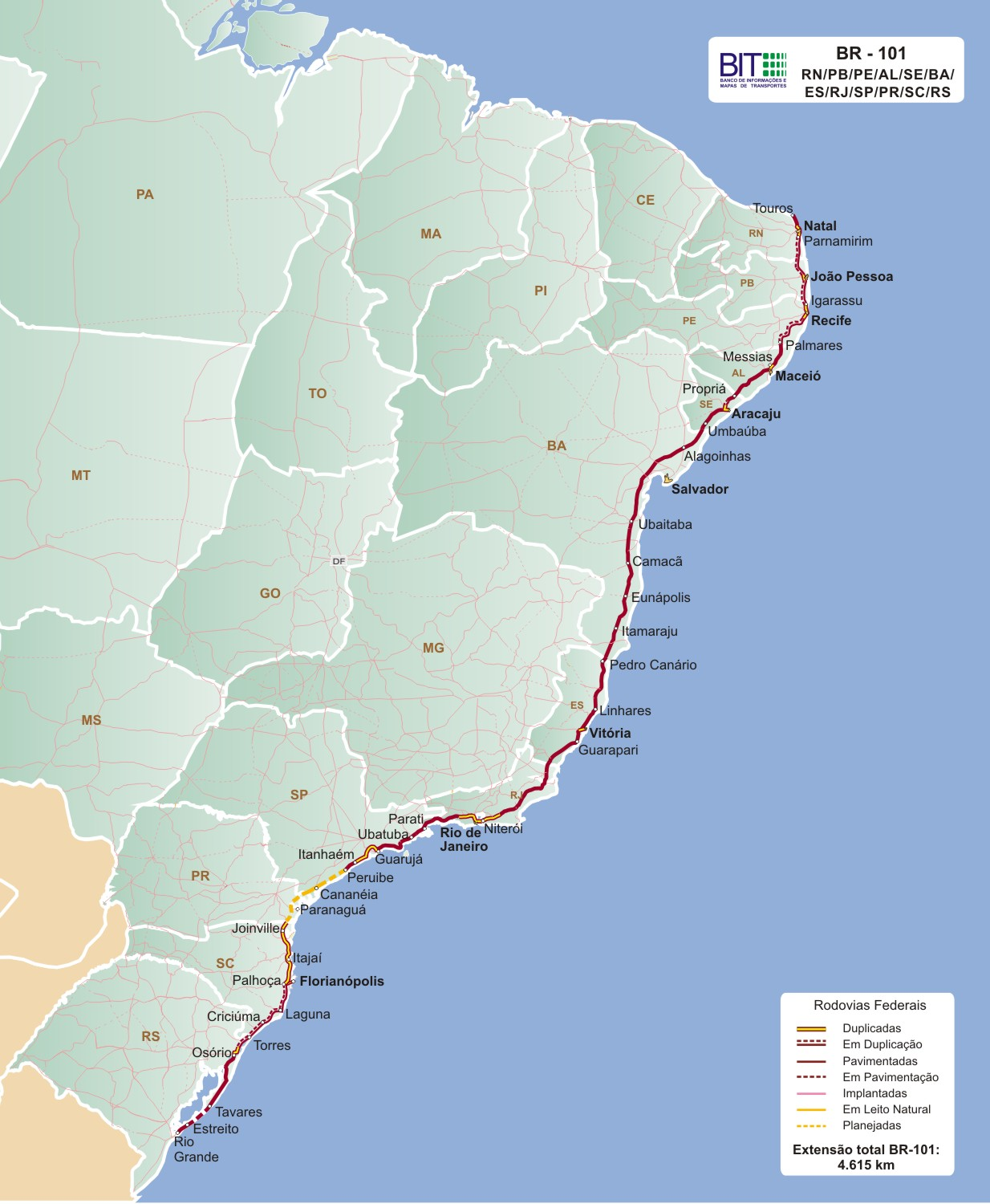
Map of BR-101

Brazil's longest highway, BR-101, is also still popularly known as Rodovia Prestes Maia for much of its 4,800 km (3,000 mi), despite having been officially renamed more than a decade ago to honor another politician from São Paulo, Mário Covas.

Rodovia Governador Mário Covas, as BR-101 has officially been known since 2001, passes through twelve Brazilian coastal states in three of the country's five geographic regions:

Northeast
Rio Grande do Norte, Paraíba, Pernambuco, Alagoas, Sergipe, Bahia
Southeast
Espírito Santo, Rio de Janeiro, São Paulo
South
Paraná, Santa Catarina, Rio Grande do Sul

=== Buildings and organizations ===
In addition to the many public roads named for Francisco Prestes Maia in the state of São Paulo and throughout Brazil, several buildings and cultural institutions also bear his name, either as an honor to him or because they are located on or near a roadway named “Prestes Maia.”

==== Prestes Maia building ====
Demonstration at 911 Prestes Maia Avenue, 2006

One particularly noteworthy building that is commonly referred to as Prestes Maia is a 22-story abandoned factory in downtown São Paulo, located near the Luz train station. The two tower blocks at 911 Avenida Prestes Maia are still registered to the long-defunct former owner, National Cloth Company (Companhia Nacional de Tecidos). In 1994 the building was purchased by a local businessman, Jorge Nacle Hamuche.

Since the 2000s there have been successive occupations by poor and/or homeless individuals connected to squatter's rights groups such as the Movimento dos Trabalhadores Sem Teto (MTST), a local homeless rights group affiliated with the national Landless Workers' Movement, or Movimento dos Trabalhadores Sem Terra (MST). These occupations have been the subject of international media coverage and documentary filmmakers.

==== Mayor Prestes Maia Library ====
The Mayor Prestes Maia Library (Biblioteca Prefeito Prestes Maia) is a multi-story public library located at 822 João Dias Avenue in the Santo Amaro district of São Paulo. The building itself was designed by Prestes Maia.

Since December 2012, the library's collection of more than 53,000 items has been focused on architecture and urbanism, including fiction and non-fiction books, magazines, atlases, braille and multimedia items. The lower three floors contain reading rooms and the reference and circulation areas. The upper floors are made up of offices, meeting and exhibition space, and the archives of the former mayor.

The special collection, Coleção Prestes Maia, of roughly 12,000 items includes rare books about architecture, urbanism, aesthetics, and history, as well as a collection of personal objects, works of art, and Prestes Maia's papers. The majority of the material at the Biblioteca Prefeito Prestes Maia circulates regularly or is otherwise available to the public. The library's collections are indexed in the São Paulo Municipal Library System online catalog.

==== Prestes Maia Gallery ====
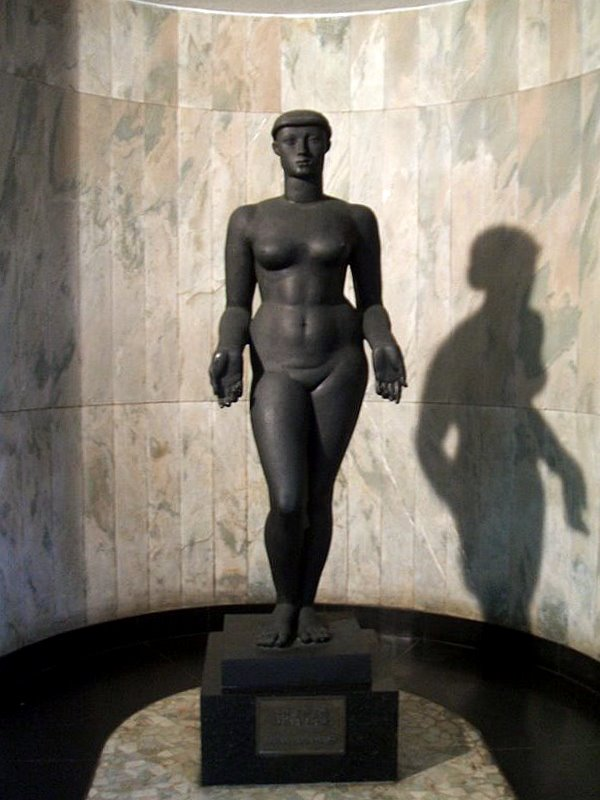
Graça by Victor Brecheret at the Galeria Prestes Maia, São Paulo

The Prestes Maia Gallery is subterranean cultural space that connects the Praça da Patriarca to the Valé do Anhangabaú in São Paulo's historic center. Completed in 1940, during Prestes Maia's second term as mayor, it was not named for him until some time later.

From nearly sixty years the space functioned alternately as an art gallery, municipal offices, and even a homeless shelter. It had badly deteriorated and in late 2000 the administration of the Gallery was taken over by the São Paulo Museum of Art (Museu de Arte de São Paulo — Masp), who planned a major renovation.

The renovations of Galeria Prestes Maia continued until 2013. The remodeled space contains various exhibition spaces, as well as two tunnels connecting the Matarazzo Building (São Paulo's city hall) and the old Othon Hotel building (now occupied by the city government).

== Bibliography ==
- Prestes Maia, Francisco (1930). Estudo de um plano de avenidas para a cidade de São Paulo. São Paulo: Melhoramentos de São Paulo. OCLC 23569675.
- Prestes Maia, Francisco (1936). O zoneamento urbano. [São Paulo]: Edições da Sociedade Amigos da Cidade.
- Prestes Maia, Francisco (1945). Os melhoramentos de São Paulo. São Paulo: [s.n.] OCLC 5016676.
- Prestes Maia, Francisco (1950). O plano regional de Santos. São Paulo: [s.n.]
- Prestes Maia, Francisco (2010). Os melhoramentos de São Paulo (2ª ed.). São Paulo: Imprensa Oficial do Estado de São Paulo. ISBN 9788570605832.
- Bittencourt, Julio (2008). In a window of Prestes Maia 911 building. Stockport, England: Dewi Lewis. ISBN 9781904587675.

Political offices
| Preceded by Fábio da Silva Prado | Mayor of São Paulo; 1938–1945 | Succeeded by Abraão Ribeiro |
| Preceded by Adhemar de Barros | Mayor of São Paulo; 1961–1965 | Succeeded by José Vicente Faria Lima |
