= Antônio Salim Curiati =

Brazilian politician (1928–2026)

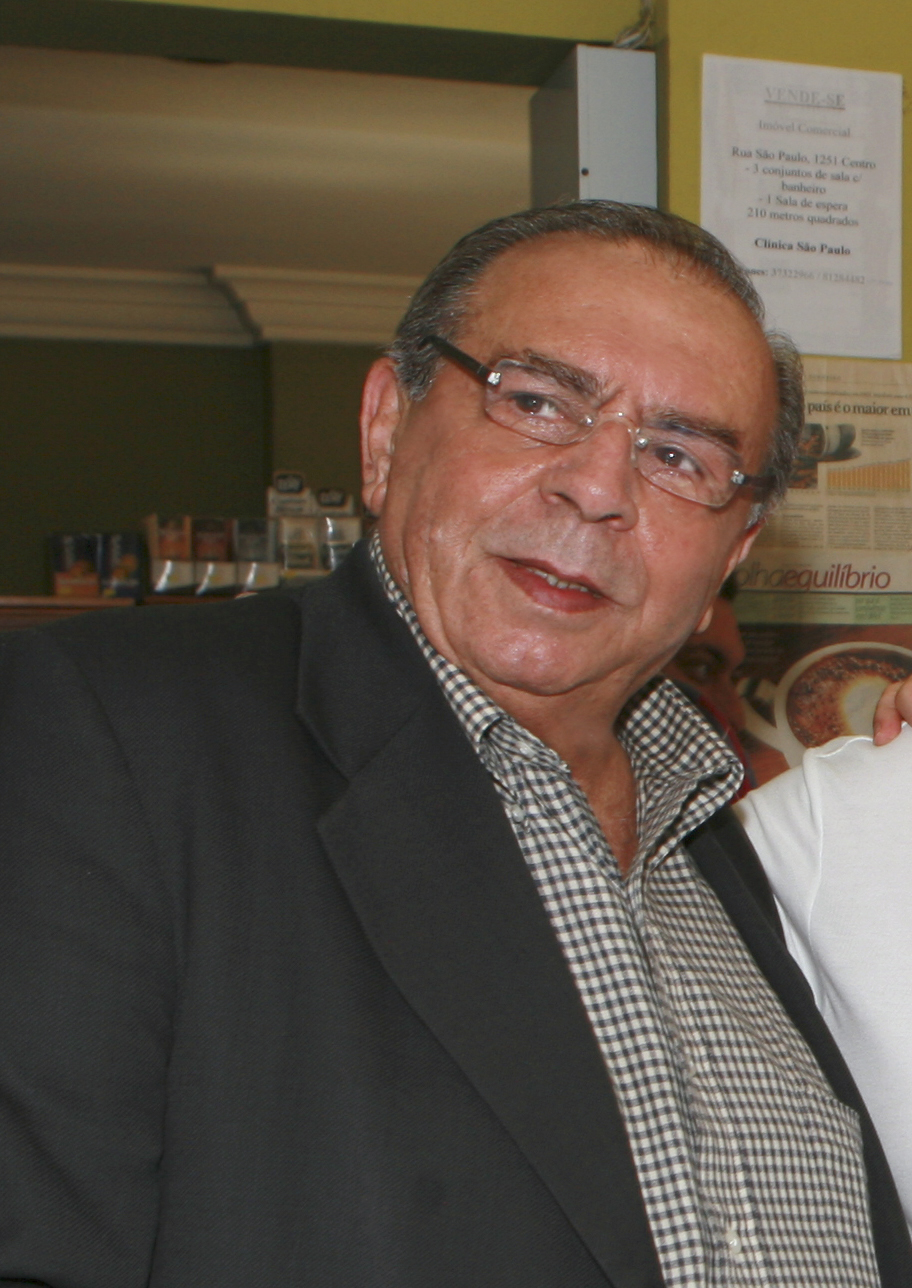
- Curiati in 2006

Mayor of São Paulo
- In office 13 May 1982 – 14 March 1983
- Preceded by: Reynaldo de Barros
- Succeeded by: Francisco Altino Lima

Personal details
- Born: 13 February 1928 Avaré, São Paulo, Brazil
- Died: 25 May 2026 (aged 98) São Paulo, São Paulo, Brazil
- Party: Progressive Party (PP)
- Relations: Jeannette Esper
- Children: 5
- Education: Federal University of São Paulo
- Occupation: Physician, politician

Antônio Salim Curiati (13 February 1928 – 25 May 2026) was a Brazilian physician and politician. He was Mayor of São Paulo from 13 May 1982 to 14 March 1983.

== Early life ==
Curiati was the son of Lebanese immigrants. Initially he studied at Scholar Group "Matilde Vieira" in Avaré, but later moved to São Paulo and attended the Colégio Marista Arquidiocesano. He later joined the Escola Paulista de Medicina where he could become an otolaryngologist.

== Political life ==
Curiati was State Deputy for São Paulo in 1966 for the first time. He served as a Federal Deputy from 1987 to 1991, during which time he participated in the Constituent Assembly of 1988, which drew up Brazil’s first democratic Constitution after the military dictatorship (1964–1985). In 2006 he was elected for his eighth term as a State Deputy.

== Short term as mayor and secretarial roles ==
Curiati was Mayor of São Paulo from 13 May 1982 to 14 March 1983 and was one of the main leaders of the Progressive Party (PP) (Portuguese: Partido Progressista), in São Paulo.

He also served as State Secretary of Social Promotion during Paulo Maluf's term as Governor of São Paulo from 1979 to 1982, City Secretary of Family and Social Welfare (1993 to 1994), and City Secretary of Community Affairs (1995 to 1998).

== Death ==
Curiati died on 25 May 2026, at the age of 98.

Preceded by Reinaldo de Barros	Mayor of São Paulo; 1982–1983	Succeeded by Francisco Altino Lima
