= Reynaldo de Barros =

Brazilian politician (1931–2011)

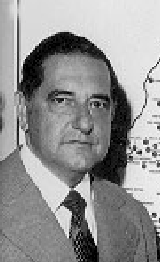
- Barros in 1979

Mayor of São Paulo
- In office 12 July 1979 – 14 May 1982
- Preceded by: Olavo Setúbal
- Succeeded by: Antônio Salim Curiati

Personal details
- Born: Reynaldo Emídio de Barros; 14 May 1931 São Paulo, Brazil
- Died: 11 February 2011 (aged 79) São Paulo, Brazil
- Party: ARENA (until 1980); PDS (1980–1993); PPR (1993–1995); PP (1995–2011)
- Education: University of São Paulo

Reynaldo Emídio de Barros (Note: With Portuguese writing conventions at the time, Reynaldo Emygdio de Barros.) (14 May 1931 – 11 February 2011) was a Brazilian politician who was mayor of São Paulo from 1979 to 1982, during the time of the military dictatorship.

Barros came from a politically prominent family in São Paulo. He was the son of Antônio Barros Filho, a politician himself and substitute for São Paulo senator Juvenal Lino de Matos, and Maria Antonieta Ferreira. His uncle was Adhemar de Barros. His son, Reynaldo de Barros Filho, was a state deputy from São Paulo from 1995 to 2003. Reynaldo graduated from the Polytechnic School of the University of São Paulo. He was appointed by then-governor Paulo Maluf to be the mayor of the city starting on 12 July 1979. He resigned as mayor on his birthday on 14 May 1982 to run for governor of São Paulo, coming in second place behind Franco Montoro. He also ran as a candidate for vice-governor in 1986, with Maluf as the candidate for governor, this time losing to Orestes Quércia. He served as the secretary of Infrastructure and Public Roads for various mayors, including Jânio Quadros, Maluf, and Celso Pitta.

Barros died on 11 February 2011 at the Hospital Sírio-Libanês in São Paulo. His family kept quiet during the time of his death, only sending communications about his death to O Estado de S. Paulo.

== Notes ==
Political offices
Preceded by Olavo Setubal	Mayor of São Paulo; 1979–1982	Succeeded by Antônio Salim Curiati
