= Mário Covas =

Brazilian politician (1930–2001)

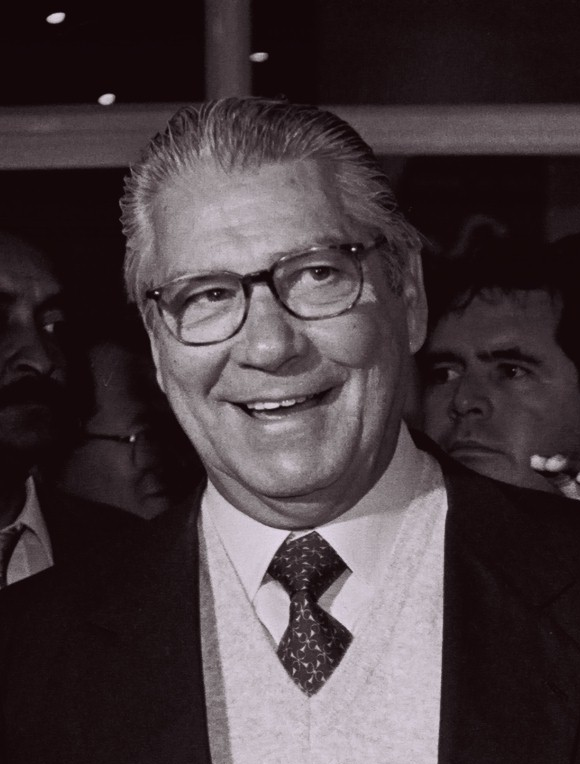
- Covas in 1997

Governor of São Paulo
- In office 1 January 1995 – 6 March 2001; Leave of absence 22 January 2001 – 6 March 2001
- Vice Governor: Geraldo Alckmin
- Preceded by: Luiz Fleury Filho
- Succeeded by: Geraldo Alckmin

Senator for São Paulo
- In office 1 February 1987 – 1 January 1995
- Preceded by: Amaral Furlan
- Succeeded by: Romeu Tuma

Mayor of São Paulo
- In office 11 May 1983 – 1 January 1986
- Preceded by: Francisco Altino Lima
- Succeeded by: Jânio Quadros

Member of the Chamber of Deputies
- In office 1 January 1986 – 1 February 1987
- Constituency: São Paulo
- In office 1 February 1983 – 15 March 1983
- Constituency: São Paulo
- In office 1 February 1963 – 7 February 1969
- Constituency: São Paulo

Personal details
- Born: 21 April 1930 Santos, São Paulo, Brazil
- Died: 6 March 2001 (aged 70) São Paulo, São Paulo, Brazil
- Cause of death: Bladder cancer
- Buried: Paquetá Cemetery, Santos, São Paulo, Brazil
- Party: PST (1959–1965); MDB (1965–1980); PMDB (1980–1988); PSDB (1988–2001)
- Spouse: Lila Almeida (m. 1954)
- Children: Renata Covas (b. 1955); Sílvia Covas (1956–1976); Mário Covas Neto (b. 1959)
- Relatives: Bruno Covas (grandson)
- Education: University of São Paulo (B.E.)
- Profession: Civil engineer
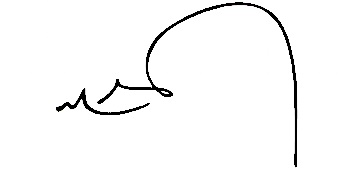
- Signature

Mário Covas Almeida Júnior (Brazilian Portuguese pronunciation: [ˈmaɾi.u ˈkɔvɐz ˈʒuni.oʁ]; 21 April 1930 – 6 March 2001) was a Brazilian politician.

== Biography ==
Covas studied engineering at the Polytechnic School of the University of São Paulo. He entered politics in his native city of Santos, in the state of São Paulo.

He was elected federal representative, mayor of São Paulo City (1983–1985), senator and twice Governor of the state of São Paulo. He was governor from 1994 to 1998, defeating Francisco Rossi in the run-off, and from 1998, defeating Paulo Maluf in the run-off, to his death in 2001. He was a founder and member of PMDB (Party of the Brazilian Democratic Movement) and later PSDB (Brazilian Social Democracy Party). In 1989, he was the PSDB presidential candidate, receiving 11% of the votes. In the run-off of that election, he supported, like his party, Luiz Inácio Lula da Silva.

He took a medical leave of absence on 22 January 2001, due to bladder cancer found during an operation to remove a prostate tumor. He died later the same year. His successor was his deputy, Geraldo Alckmin.

== Electoral history ==
1994 São Paulo gubernatorial election
Party	Candidate	Round 1		Round 2	
Party	Candidate	Votes	%	Votes	%
PSDB	Mário Covas	6,574,517	46.84	8,661,960	56.12
PDT	Francisco Rossi	3,119,592	22.23	6,771,454	43.88
PT	José Dirceu	2,085,193	14.86	Eliminated	
PMDB	Barros Munhoz	1,584,397	11.29	Eliminated	
PP	Luiz Antônio Medeiros	317,593	2.26	Eliminated	
PRONA	Álvaro Soares Dutra	144,196	1.03	Eliminated	
PSC	Eduardo Resstom	134,064	0.95	Eliminated	
PRN	Ciro Moura	75,727	0.54	Eliminated	
Total votes		14,035,279	100.00%	15,433,414	100.00%
Invalid and blank votes		4,377,969	23.78%	2,315,122	13.04%
PSDB gain from PMDB					

1998 São Paulo gubernatorial election
Party	Candidate	Round 1		Round 2	
Party	Candidate	Votes	%	Votes	%
PSDB	Mário Covas	3,813,186	22.95	9,800,253	55.37
PPB	Paulo Maluf	5,351,026	32.21	7,900,598	44.63
PT	Marta Suplicy	3,738,750	22.51	Eliminated	
PDT	Francisco Rossi	2,843,515	17.18	Eliminated	
PMDB	Orestes Quércia	714,097	4.30	Eliminated	
PRONA	Constantino Cury	68,906	0.41	Eliminated	
PSTU	Antônio Donizete	29,033	0.18	Eliminated	
PSDC	João Manuel Batista	24,229	0.15	Eliminated	
PSC	Edson Falanga	14,853	0.09	Eliminated	
PRTB	Levy Fidelix	14,406	0.08	Eliminated	
Total votes		16,612,001	100.00%	17,700,851	100.00%
Invalid and blank votes		2,858,536	14.68%	1,473,216	7.68%
PSDB hold					

Party political offices
New political party	PSDB nominee for President of Brazil; 1989	Succeeded by Fernando Henrique Cardoso
Political offices
Preceded by Francisco Altino Lima (acting)	Mayor of São Paulo; 1983–1985	Succeeded by Jânio Quadros
Preceded by Luiz Antônio Fleury Filho	Governor of São Paulo; 1995–2001	Succeeded by Geraldo Alckmin
