= Olavo Setúbal =

Engineer, industrialist, banker, and Brazilian politician, former mayor of São Paulo

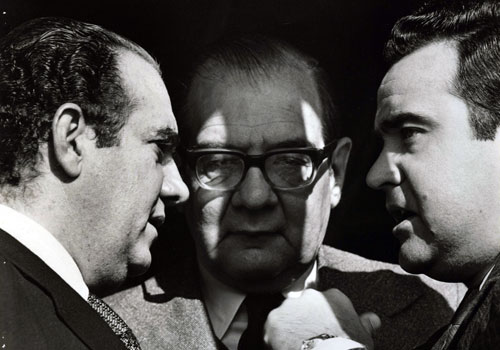

Mayor of São Paulo
- In office 17 August 1975 – 11 July 1979
- Appointed by: Paulo Egydio Martins
- Preceded by: Miguel Colasuonno
- Succeeded by: Reynaldo de Barros

Minister of Foreign Affairs
- In office 15 March 1985 – 14 February 1986
- President: José Sarney
- Preceded by: Ramiro Saraiva Guerreiro
- Succeeded by: Abreu Sodré

Personal details
- Born: 15 April 1923 São Paulo, Brazil
- Died: 27 August 2008 (aged 85) São Paulo, Brazil
- Party: ARENA (1974–1978); PMDB (1982–1985); PFL (1985–2007); DEM (2007–2008)
- Spouses: Mathilde de Azevedo (m. 1946; died 1977) Daisy Salles (m. 1979)
- Education: Polytechnic School of the University of São Paulo (BE)
- Occupation: Engineer, banker, politician
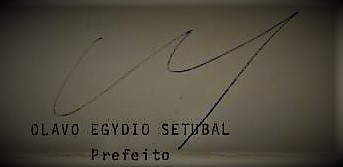
- Signature

Olavo Egydio Setúbal (15 April 1923 – 27 August 2008) was a Brazilian industrialist, banker and politician. He had served as Mayor of São Paulo from 1975 to 1979, Minister of Foreign Affairs from 1985 to 1986, and chairman of the Itaúsa conglomerate from 2001 until his death in 2008.

== Early life ==
Olavo Setúbal was born in São Paulo. His surname comes from the city Setúbal in Portugal, where his great-grandfather was born. He decided to become an engineer at an early age, against the wishes of his father Paulo, a successful bohemian writer, who advised Olavo to become a lawyer instead. After his father's death, his mother, Francisca Setúbal, supported his studies from the age of 13 onwards. In 1945, he graduated from the Polytechnic School of the University of São Paulo and began working as professor-assistant at the Instituto de Pesquisas Tecnológicas (IPT) in São Paulo.

== Business career ==
With US $10,000 that he managed to save, Setúbal and an old school friend bought two machines, founding Deca. The company produced parts for knobs and faucets and had ten employees at the time of its founding. The business struggled until 1953, with the introduction to the industry of the flush valve.

When Deca was doing well, Setúbal was asked to help salvage his uncle Alfredo's businesses, Duratex and a small bank, the Banco Federal de Crédito. Setúbal successfully relieved both institutions from debt. When his uncle died in 1959, Setúbal became general director of the Banco Federal de Crédito. He started seeking big clients and obtained resources that allowed the bank to finance bigger operations. One of his first measures was to make sure all managers had at least a high-school education.

In the 1960s, Setúbal concluded that the only way to expand the business was to incorporate other institutions. When Banco Itaú was bought in 1964, the client base was mainly rural and the bank became the 16th largest in Brazil. A series of further mergers led to Setúbal becoming the second largest banker in Brazil by the end of the 1970s.

== Political career ==
In 1975, Governor of São Paulo Paulo Egydio Martins appointed him to the post of Mayor of São Paulo.

In 1985, Tancredo Neves appointed Setúbal as Minister of Foreign Relations, and he took up the post during the presidency of José Sarney.

He attempted to run for Governor of São Paulo in 1986, but was defeated in an internal election of the Liberal Front Party (PFL), and gave up the idea, retiring from political life.

Political offices
Preceded by Miguel Colasuonno	Mayor of São Paulo; 1975–1979	Succeeded by Reinaldo de Barros
