= Miguel Colasuonno =

Brazilian politician, economist, former mayor of São Paulo

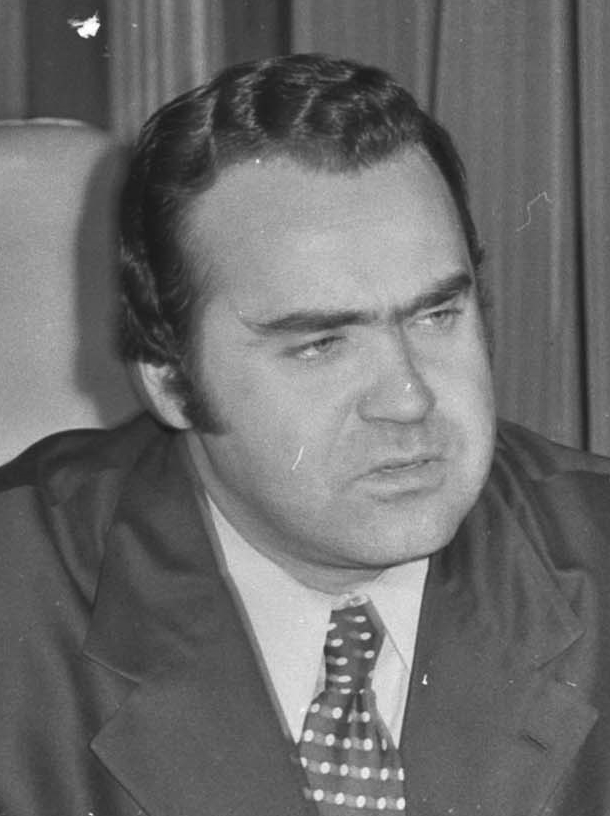
- Colasuonno in 1973

Mayor of São Paulo
- In office August 28, 1973 – August 16, 1975
- Appointed by: Laudo Natel
- Preceded by: Brasil Vita
- Succeeded by: Olavo Setúbal

Secretary of Finance and Planning of São Paulo
- In office November 15, 1971 – August 27, 1973
- President: Laudo Natel
- Preceded by: José Carlos de Figueiredo Ferraz

Personal details
- Born: February 2, 1939 São Paulo, Brazil
- Died: October 4, 2013 (aged 74) São Paulo, Brazil
- Party: PPR (1993–1995); PPB (1995–2000); PMDB (2000–2013)
- Spouse: Marlene Cintra Colasuonno
- Education: University of São Paulo (BS); Vanderbilt University (MA, PhD)
- Occupation: Economist, politician

Miguel Colasuonno (February 2, 1939 – October 4, 2013) was a Brazilian economist and politician who served as the 38th mayor of São Paulo, Brazil.

== Early life ==
Miguel Colasuonno was born in São Paulo, the son of an Italian immigrants José Colasuonno and Vincenza Orlandi Colasuonno. His father was a finance inspector. As a child, Colasuonno attended the Colégio Dante Alighieri, widely considered one of the most traditional schools in Brazil.

In 1962, he obtained his BS degree in economics from the University of São Paulo, followed by a postgraduate degree in economics specialized in international trade and exchange rates in 1965. In 1966, Colasuonno traveled to the United States, where he earned an MA in economics and PhD in foreign business from Vanderbilt University in 1966.

== Academic career ==
Between 1966 and 1971, Colasuonno was a professor in the Faculty of Economics, Administration, and Accounting at the University of São Paulo, where he served as the first executive secretary of the Institute of Economic Research (IPE). In 1970, he arranged for the IPE to lead all economic study and calculation of the cost-of-living index for families in São Paulo, a responsibility previously undertaken by economists within the Municipal Chamber of São Paulo. The methodological improvements made during this transition laid the groundwork for Brazil's consumer price index.

== Political career ==
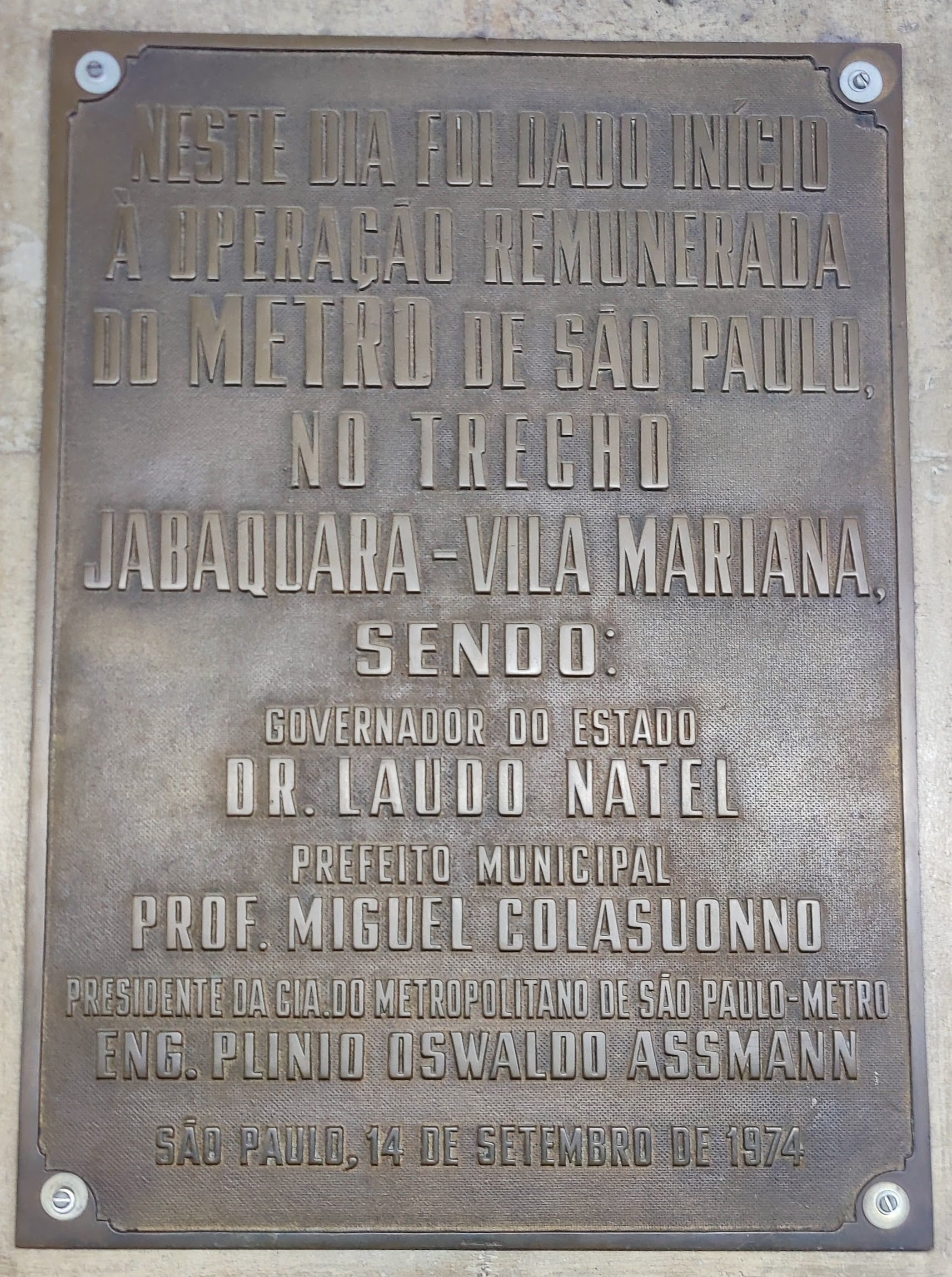
Inauguration plaque for the first stretch of the São Paulo Metro (1974)

Colasuonno began his political career in 1971 at the age of 31 when he was appointed as Secretary of Finance and Planning of São Paulo during the government of Laudo Natel. In 1973, he was nominated by Natel to serve as mayor of São Paulo.

In 1973, Colasuonno signed a agreement with the United States to create the science and technology project "PROCET", designed to reinvigorate technological and scientific research in Brazil. Several Brazilian institutions, including the Institute of Food Technology and the Institute for Technological Research, were modernized as a result of the new funding allocations. Colasuonno was named the 1973 Economist of the Year by the Order of Economists of Brazil (OEB).

In 1974, Colasuonno inaugurated São Paulo's first complete metro line, the modern-day portion of Line 1 from Jabaquara to Vila Mariana.

Upon leaving office, Colasuonno accepted a role as an economic advisor to the administration of President Ernesto Geisel (1976–1979), while also serving as the coordinator of special projects for the Office of the Secretary of Planning.

From 1980-1985, Colasuonno served as president of Embratur, Brazil's federal tourism agency. Under his leadership, Embratur opened up alternative "gateways" to Brazilian tourism, allowing foreign tourists entry itineraries beyond Rio de Janeiro, and constructed "Popular Tourism Terminals" in various local municipalities to support day-tripper tourism.

Colasuonno returned to city politics in 1992 upon winning election as a São Paulo city councilor, at first representing the Brazilian Social Democracy Party (PDS). He was subsequently re-elected for the Progressistas (PPB). He served two terms in total for the Câmara Municipal, assuming the presidency in 1994 and 1995. During his tenure, Colasuonno was part of a political contingent on the council known as "os notáveis", or "the notables", who sat at the forefront of rigorous debates over such issues as the urban property tax and the 1997 revisions to the São Paulo's strategic master plan. He chaired the finance and budget committee and spearheaded a number of projects that became municipal law, including Law 12.153/1996, requiring prior notification of public demonstrations on Paulista Avenue to the São Paulo Municipal Traffic Engineering Company, and Law 12.392/1997, declaring the inclusion of the Italian language as an optional subject for São Paulo schools.

== Personal life ==
Colasuonno had four children with his wife, Marlene Cintra Colasuonno. He died on October 4, 2013, aged 74, at the Instituto do Coração (Incor) in São Paulo from complications of acute leukemia. He is buried at the Cemitério do Morumbi.

Political offices
Preceded by Brasil Vita	Mayor of São Paulo; 1973–1975	Succeeded by Olavo Setúbal
