= José Freitas Nobre =

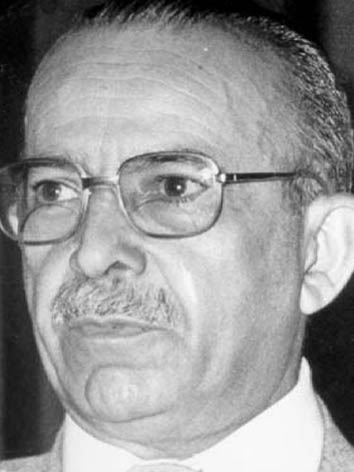

Federal Deputy
- In office 1 February 1971 – 1 February 1987
- Constituency: São Paulo

Vice Mayor of São Paulo
- In office 8 April 1961 – 7 April 1965
- Mayor: Prestes Maia
- Preceded by: Cantídio Nogueira Sampaio
- Succeeded by: Leôncio Ferraz Júnior

Personal details
- Born: 24 March 1921 Fortaleza, Ceará, Brazil
- Died: 19 November 1990 (aged 69) São Paulo, Brazil
- Party: PSB (until 1965); MDB (1965–1990)
- Profession: Lawyer; journalist; professor

José Freitas Nobre (21 March 1921 – 19 November 1990) was a Brazilian lawyer, journalist, politician, and professor. He had served in various positions in São Paulo politics, including as vice mayor and councilor. He became a federal deputy from the state of São Paulo from 1972 to 1987. He was a member of the Brazilian Democratic Movement (MDB). He is the namesake for the current full name of São Paulo–Congonhas Airport.

== Biography ==
Born in Fortaleza, Ceará in 1921, Freitas Nobre was the son of Manoel Aprígio Nobre and Letícia Freitas Nobre. José graduated from the University of São Paulo law school in 1948. Later on in 1970, he earned a doctorate degree from the Faculty of Law of Paris under the advisory of Fernand Terrou.

Before the start of his political career, he was a lawyer specializing in matters of freedom of speech and freedom of the press. He was later a professor at the University of São Paulo School of Communications and Arts. He was also the president of the Sindicato de Jornalistas Profissionais do Estado de São Paulo, the union for journalists in the state of São Paulo. He was also a local spiritist leader.

Freitas Nobre was first elected as vice-mayor of São Paulo in 1961, during the last term of mayor Prestes Maia. After his term ended in 1965, he attempted to run for mayor but was ineligible to run due to the disbanding of democratic governance by the military dictatorship. He was elected as a federal deputy from São Paulo beginning in the early 1970s, becoming one of the leaders of the MDB in the chamber of deputies, as well as vice-president of the chamber. At that time, he was one of the strongest voices against the military dictatorship in the chamber. After retiring from politics, he returning to lecturing and was nominated in 1990 to be titular professor, but died before his nomination was considered.

He had 4 children: Clovis, Olga Maria, Marcos Nobre, and Marcelo Rossi. An auditorium in the National Congress Palace is named after him. On 25 May 2017, the federal Senate approved a proposal to officially rename São Paulo–Congonhas Airport to São Paulo/Congonhas–Deputado Freitas Nobre Airport in his honor. It was entered to the Diário Oficial da União by then-president Michel Temer on 16 June 2017.
