= Salgado Filho =

Coordinates: 26°10′12″S 53°21′39″W

- Municipality
- Interactive map of Salgado Filho
- Country: Brazil
- Region: Southern
- State: Paraná
- Mesoregion: Sudoeste Paranaense

Population (2020)
  - Total: 3,483
- Time zone: UTC−3 (BRT)

Salgado Filho is a municipality in the state of Paraná in the Southern Region of Brazil.

== See also ==
- List of municipalities in Paraná
