= Emídio de Souza =

Brazilian lawyer and politician

Emidio de Souza
- Emídio Pereira de Souza
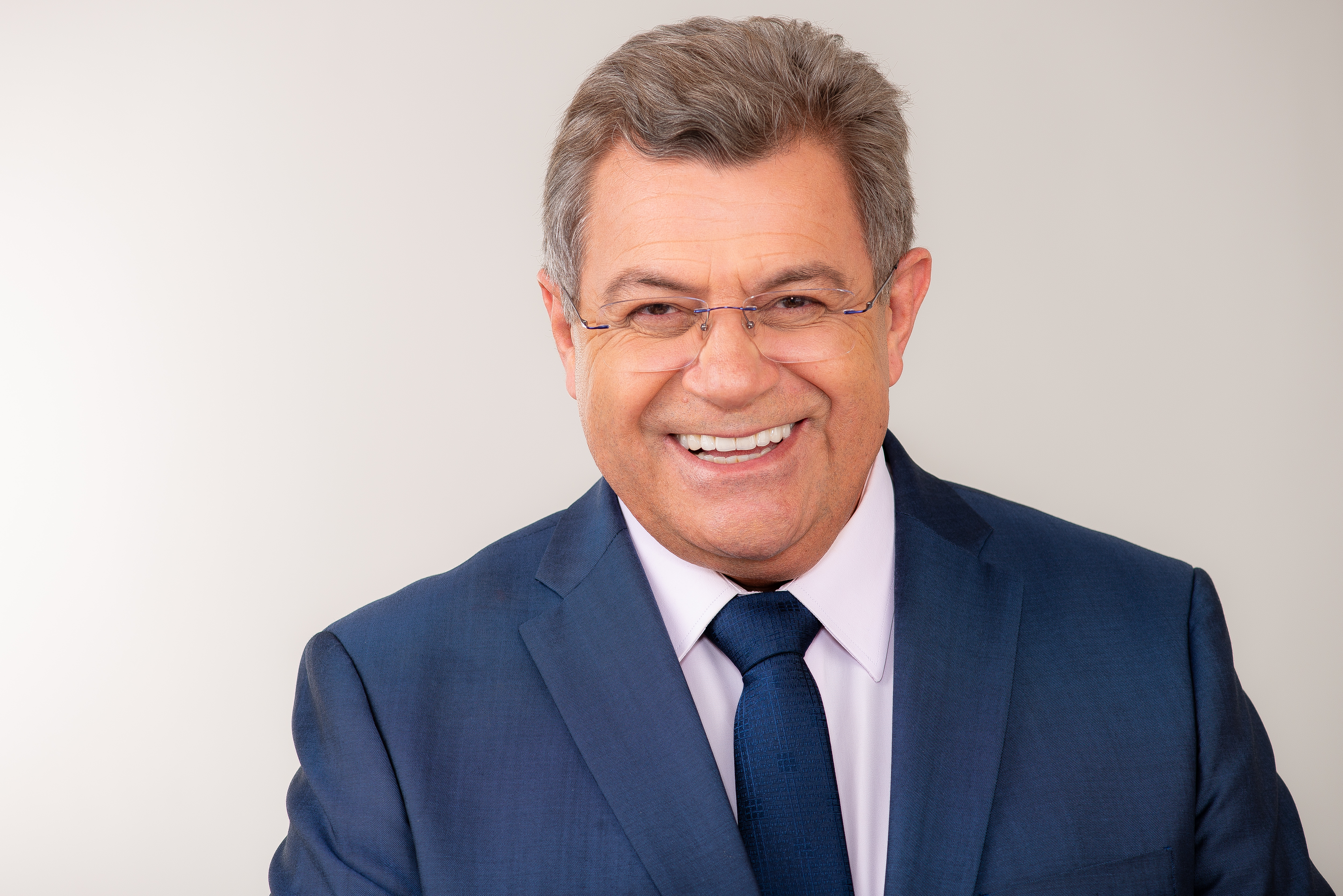
- Emídio de Souza in 2024

Member of the Legislative Assembly of São Paulo
- Incumbent
- Assumed office 15 March 2019

Mayor of Osasco
- In office 1 January 2005 – 31 December 2012
- Preceded by: Celso Giglio
- Succeeded by: Jorge Lapas

State Deputy of São Paulo
- In office 1 February 2003 – 31 December 2004

City Councillor of Osasco
- In office 1 January 1989 – 31 December 2000

Personal details
- Born: Emídio Pereira de Souza; May 22, 1959 (age 67) Inúbia Paulista, São Paulo, Brazil
- Citizenship: Brazilian
- Party: Workers' Party (1980–present)
- Spouse: Gabriela Araújo
- Children: 5
- Occupation: Politician
- Profession: Lawyer

Emidio Pereira de Souza (May 22, 1959), better known as Emidio de Souza, is a Brazilian lawyer and politician affiliated with the Workers’ Party (PT). He served two terms as mayor of Osasco and is currently serving his third term as a state deputy for São Paulo.

== Biography ==
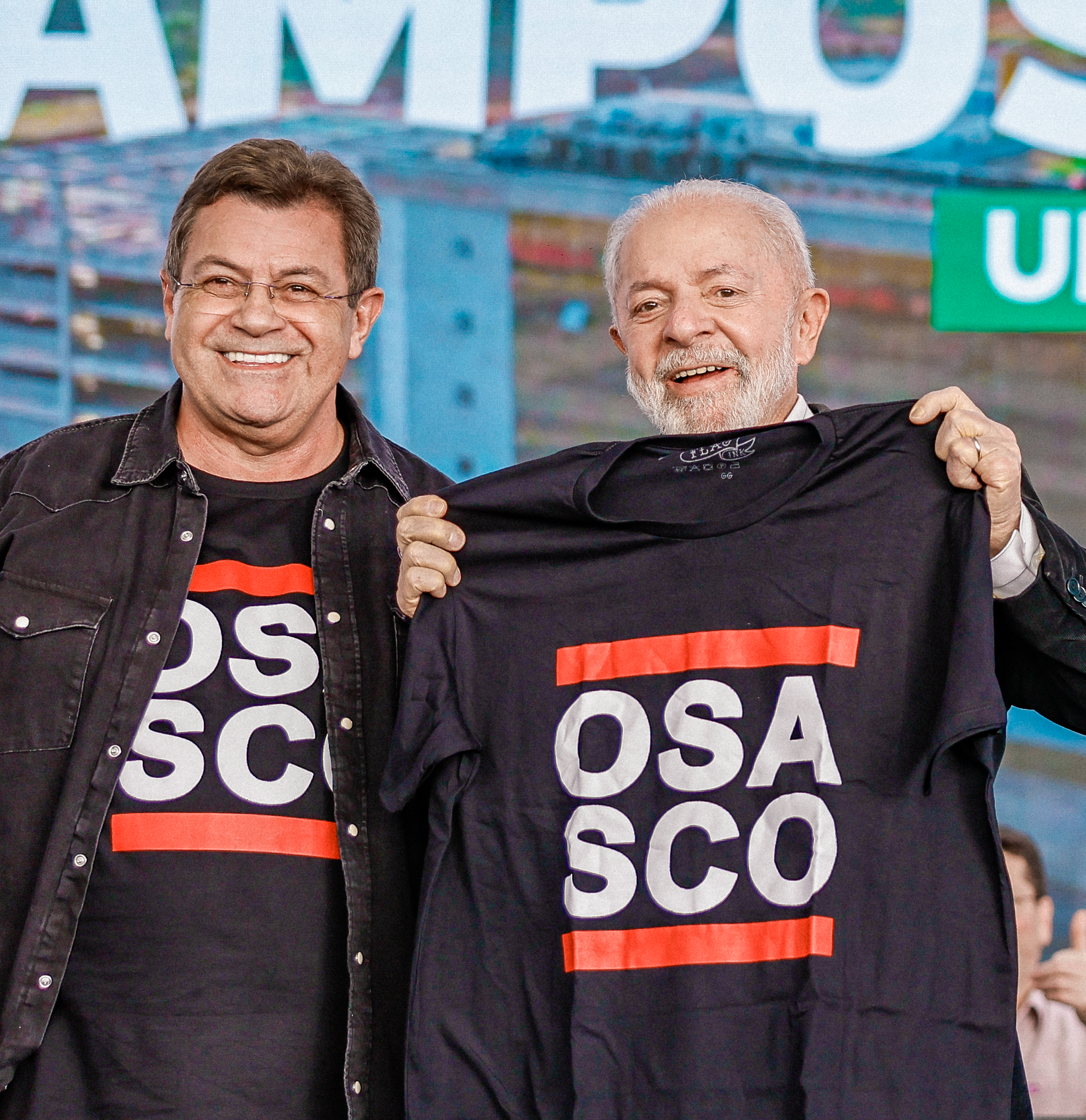
Emídio and Luiz Inácio Lula da Silva in 2024.

The son of migrants from the Northeast Region, Emídio was born in the town of Inúbia Paulista, in the interior of São Paulo. At the age of 13, he moved to Osasco, where he began working as a metalworker. Within the popular movements of the Catholic Church, commonly referred to as Liberation Theology, he became involved in the labor movement. With the rise of Luiz Inácio Lula da Silva within the labor movement, Emídio began to actively participate in the labor movement, where he helped found the Workers’ Party (PT) and the Central Única dos Trabalhadores (CUT).

In the 1988 Municipal election in Osasco, he ran for city council as a candidate for the PT. He was elected and served in the seventh term of the Osasco City Council, where he remained until 1992. In the 1992 election, he was re-elected to the position and served his second term as a city council member in Osasco. In 1996, he ran for his third term and was elected after receiving just over 2,000 votes, becoming one of the three council members elected from the PT.

In 2000 election, he was the PT's candidate for mayor of Osasco. Emídio was defeated in the first round by Celso Giglio (PTB) by a margin of 12,000 votes. Following his defeat, he ran for the office of State Deputy of São Paulo in 2002 and was elected after receiving more than 100,000 votes. In 2004, he ran again for mayor of Osasco, defeating Celso Giglio (PSDB) in the runoff election, surpassing the 200,000-vote mark, beating Giglio by just over 20,000 votes. He ran for reelection in 2008, defeating two former mayors of the city, Celso Giglio (PSDB) and Francisco Rossi (PMDB), in the first round.

In 2013, Emidio was elected State Chairman of the Workers’ Party in São Paulo, leading the party in the state until May 2017. After serving as head of the São Paulo chapter, he took on another role within the party's leadership, joining the PT's National Secretariat for Finance and Planning, a position he held until February 2020.

In 2018, he ran for the office of state deputy in São Paulo and was elected to his second term in the Legislative Assembly of São Paulo (Alesp). During Luiz Inácio Lula da Silva's detention, he served as Lula's attorney while he was in custody in Curitiba, visiting him daily and participating in negotiations with the Federal Police (PF). In 2020, he ran for a third term as mayor of Osasco. Although he had already served two terms as mayor of the city, he finished in third place in an election won by Rogério Lins (PODE).

In 2022, he ran again for state representative in São Paulo and was elected to a third term after receiving more than 150,000 votes. He ran for mayor of Osasco again in 2024. By a margin of more than 225,000 votes, he was defeated in the first round by Gerson Pessoa (PODE). In the 2026 São Paulo state election, he was responsible for coordinating Fernando Haddad's campaign for governor, as well as overseeing the government's policy platform. In 2026, he ran again for the office of state representative in São Paulo. After receiving more than 100,000 votes, he was elected to his fourth term in the Alesp.

=== Electoral performance ===
| Year | Position | Party | Votes | Result | Ref. |
|---|---|---|---|---|---|
| 1988 | Osasco City Council Member | PT | 1,843 | Elected | |
| 1992 | Osasco City Council Member | PT | 2 269 | Elected | |
| 1996 | Osasco City Council Member | PT | 2,626 | Elected | |
| 2000 | Mayor of Osasco | PT | 158,902 | Not elected | |
| 2002 | State deputy of São Paulo | PT | 102,331 | Elected | |
| 2004 | Mayor or Osasco | PT | 179,206 | Elected | |
| 2008 | Mayor or Osasco | PT | 204,356 | Elected | |
| 2018 | State deputy of São Paulo | PT | 65,898 | Elected | |
| 2020 | Mayor or Osasco | PT | 44,849 | Not elected | |
| 2022 | State deputy of São Paulo | PT | 157,834 | Elected | |
| 2024 | Mayor or Osasco | PT | 57,245 | Not elected | |
| 2026 | State deputy of São Paulo | PT | 108,527 | Elected | |

== Personal life ==
Emídio is Catholic. He was married to Márcia Abreu, with whom he had four children; she served as first lady of Osasco during Emídio's two terms as mayor of Osasco. The couple got divorced.

Emidio de Souza is married to Gabriela Araújo since 2014, a desembargadora and former CNN Brasil commentator. The couple has a daughter. Both are personal friends of Luiz Inácio Lula da Silva.
