= Lia Maria Aguiar =

Brazilian billionaire

Lia Maria Aguiar is a Brazilian billionaire. Daughter of Amador Aguiar and twin sister of Lina Maria Aguiar, Lia holds 1.8% of the shares of Banco Bradesco and shares of Bradespar. Her net worth was estimated at $1.32 billion in September 2017.

Lia has already publicly stated that she does not have children and that she has decided to donate all of her assets to the foundation that bears her name.
