= Guaçu Piteri =

Brazilian politician (1935–2021)

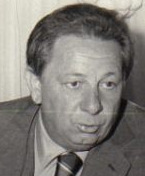
- Piteri in 1976
- Born: 6 April 1935
- Died: June 6, 2021 (aged 86)
- Occupation: Politician

Guaçu Piteri (6 April 1935 – 6 June 2021) was a Brazilian politician who served as a deputy of São Paulo (1975–1977). He also served as the second (1967–1970) and fifth (1977–1982) mayor of Osasco, succeeding Francisco Rossi.
