= Rede Energia =

Rede Energia S.A.
- Company type: Public (Sociedade Anônima)
- Traded as: B3: REDE3, REDE4
- Industry: Electricity
- Founded: 1903
- Headquarters: São Paulo, Brazil
- Key people: Jorge Queiroz de Moraes Junior (Chairman); Carmen Campos Pereira (CEO)
- Services: Electric power distribution Electric power transmission
- Revenue: ▲US$ 4.2 billion (2012)
- Net income: ▲ - US$ 389.6 million (2012)
- Number of employees: 14,100
- Parent: CPFL Energia; Equatorial Energia
- Website: www.gruporede.com.br

Rede Energia Participacoes, formerly Rede Energia was a Brazil-based utility holding dedicated on electricity energy, is one of the biggest Brazilian electricity companies.

Through nine distributors, one generator and one transmitter, operates in distribution, marketing and power generation. It is responsible for supplying about 34% of the entire national territory, which means attending 16 million people in 578 municipalities in seven different Brazilian states: São Paulo, Minas Gerais, Paraná, Tocantins, Mato Grosso, Mato Grosso do Sul and Pará.

Rede Energia distributes 18.5 terawatts/hours per year through its 563 substations, which travels 15,000 km of transmission lines and 300,000 km of distribution networks. The company has more than 14,000 people in its workforce to deliver electric energy at 4.5 million consumer units.

The company is headquartered in Paulista Avenue in São Paulo and is listed in BM&F Bovespa.
