= 2004 São Paulo mayoral election =

2004 São Paulo municipal election
- October 3, 2004 (first round); October 31, 2004 (second round)
- Turnout: 85.05% (first round); 82.45% (second round)
- Mayoral election
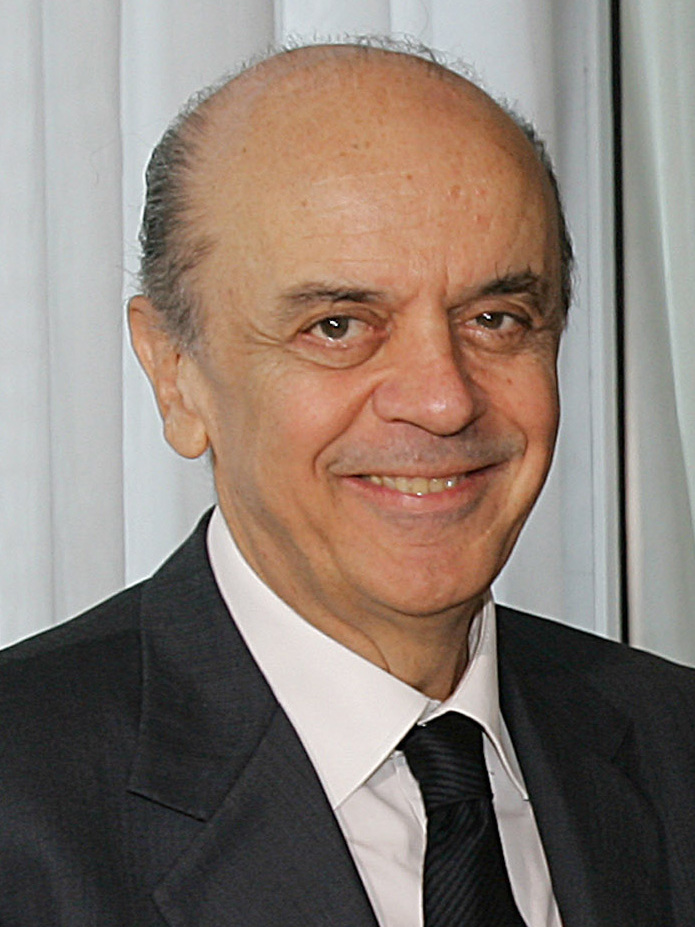

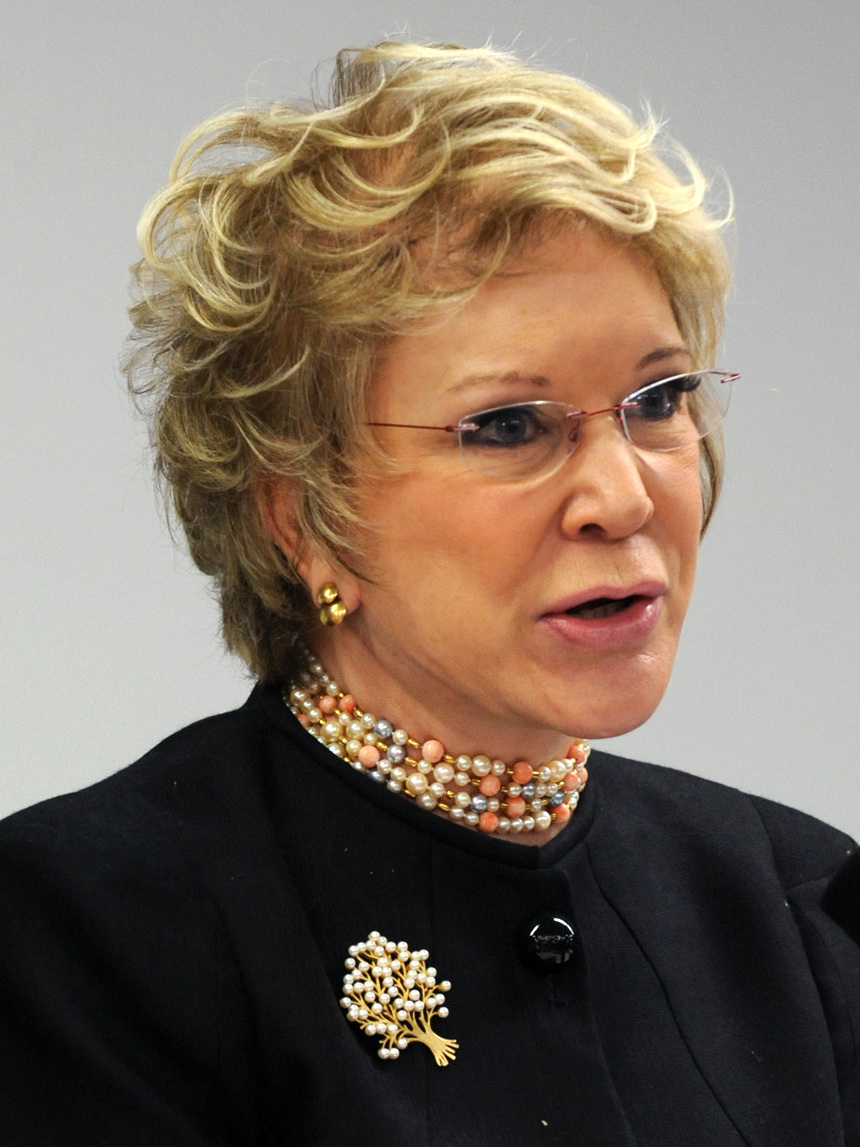
Candidate	José Serra	Marta Suplicy
Party	PSDB	PT
Running mate	Gilberto Kassab	Rui Falcão
Popular vote	3,330,179	2,740,152
Percentage	54.86%	45.14%
- José Serra Marta Suplicy
Mayor before election
Marta Suplicy
PT
Elected mayor
José Serra
PSDB

The 2004 São Paulo municipal election took place in the city of São Paulo, with the first round taking place on 3 October and the second round taking place on 31 October 2004. Voters voted to elect the Mayor, the Vice Mayor and 55 City Councillors for the administration of the city. The result was a 2nd round victory for José Serra, of the Brazilian Social Democratic Party (PSDB), winning 3,330,179 votes and a share of 54,86% of the popular vote, defeating incumbent mayor Marta Suplicy of the Workers' Party (PT), who took 2,740,152 votes and a share of 45,14% of the popular vote.

== Candidates ==
=== Candidates in runoff ===
#	Party/coalition	Mayoral candidate	Political office(s)	Vice-Mayoral candidate
13	"Union for São Paulo"; PT, PCdoB, PRTB, PTN, PSL, PTB, PL	Marta Suplicy (PT)	Mayor of São Paulo 2001–05; Federal Deputy from São Paulo 1995–99	Rui Falcão (PT)
45	"Ethics and Work"; PSDB, PFL, PPS	José Serra (PSDB)	PSDB National President 2003–05; Minister of Health 1998–2002; Minister of Planning and Budget 1995–96; Federal Deputy from São Paulo 1987–95	Gilberto Kassab (PFL)

=== Candidates failing to make runoff ===
#	Party/coalition	Mayoral candidate	Political office(s)	Vice-Mayoral candidate
11	Progressive Party (PP)	Paulo Maluf (PP)	Mayor of São Paulo 1993–97, 1969–71; Federal Deputy from São Paulo 1983–87; Governor of São Paulo 1979–82; President of the Federal Savings Bank 1967–69	Curiati Júnior (PP)
12	Democratic Labour Party (PDT)	Paulo Pereira da Silva (PDT)		Juarez Soares (PDT)
16	United Socialist Workers' Party (PSTU)	Dirceu Travesso (PSTU)		Ana Rosa Minutti (PSTU)
21	Brazilian Communist Party (PCB)	Walter Canoas (PCB)		Isabel Piragibe (PCB)
26	Party of the Nation's Retirees (PAN)	Osmar Lins (PAN)		Toby Auad (PAN)
27	Social Democratic Christian Party (PSDC)	João Manuel (PSDC)		Regina Signore (PSDC)
29	Workers' Cause Party (PCO)	Anaí Caproni (PCO)		Júlio Marcelino (PCO)
31	Humanist Party of Solidarity (PHS)	Francisco Rossi (PHS)	Mayor of Osasco 1989–93, 1973–77; Federal Deputy from São Paulo 1987–89, 1979–83	Nelita Rocha (PHS)
36	"Paulista Flag"; PTC, PSC, PTdoB, PRP	Ciro Moura (PTC)		Ulisses Batista (PSC)
40	"Commitment with São Paulo"; PSB, PMDB, PMN	Luiza Erundina (PSB)	Federal Deputy from São Paulo since 1999; Minister of Federal Administration 1993; Mayor of São Paulo 1989–93; State Deputy of São Paulo 1987–89; City Councillor of São Paulo 1983–86	Michel Temer (PMDB)
43	Green Party (PV)	José Luiz Penna (PV)		Lourdes Pinheiro (PV)
56	Party of the Reconstruction of the National Order (PRONA)	Havanir Nimtz (PRONA)	State Deputy of São Paulo 2003–07; City Councillor of São Paulo 2001–03	Erivaldo Almeida (PRONA)

== Results ==
=== Mayor ===
Candidate	Running mate	Party	First round		Second round	
Candidate	Running mate	Party	Votes	%	Votes	%
José Serra	Gilberto Kassab (PFL)	PSDB	2,686,396	43.56	3,330,179	54.86
Marta Suplicy (incumbent)	Rui Falcão	PT	2,209,264	35.82	2,740,152	45.14
Paulo Maluf	Curiati Júnior	PP	734,580	11.91		
Luiza Erundina	Michel Temer (PMDB)	PSB	244,090	3.96		
Paulo Pereira da Silva	Juarez Soares	PDT	86,549	1.40		
Francisco Rossi	Nelita Rocha	PHS	77,957	1.26		
Havanir Nimtz	Erivaldo Almeida	PRONA	47,579	0.77		
José Luiz Penna	Loures Pinheiro	PV	43,868	0.71		
Osmar Lins	Antônio Auad	PAN	16,339	0.26		
Dirceu Travesso	Ana Rosa Minutti	PSTU	8,394	0.14		
Ciro Moura	Ulisses Batista (PSC)	PTC	6,111	0.10		
Walter Canoas	Isabel Piragibe	PCB	3,138	0.05		
João Manuel	Renata Signore	PSDC	1,627	0.03		
Anaí Caproni	Júlio Marcelino	PCO	1,479	0.02		
Total			6,167,371	100.00	6,070,331	100.00
Valid votes			6,167,371	93.31	6,070,331	94.74
Invalid votes			290,414	4.39	241,217	3.76
Blank votes			151,598	2.29	95,921	1.50
Total votes			6,609,383	100.00	6,407,469	100.00
Registered voters/turnout			7,771,503	85.05	7,771,503	82.45

Popular vote (first round)
Serra	43.56%
Suplicy	35.82%
Maluf	11.91%
Erundina	3.96%
Pereira	1.40%
Others	3.34%

Popular vote (second round)
Serra	54.86%
Suplicy	45.14%

=== City Councillors ===
Candidate	Party	Voting	
Candidate	Party	Total	Percentage
José Aníbal	PSDB	165,880	2.78%
Arselino Tatto	PT	73,308	1.23%
Celso Jatene	PTB	69,354	1.16%
Antonio Goulart	PMDB	67,594	1.13%
Milton Leite	PMDB	63,374	1.06%
Antônio Donato	PT	58,952	0.99%
Ricardo Montoro	PSDB	57,600	0.97%
Reginaldo Tripoli	PSDB	57,405	0.96%
Antonio Carlos Rodrigues	PL	57,307	0.96%
Gilson Barreto	PSDB	55,039	0.92%
Jorge Tadeu	PMDB	51,668	0.87%
Soninha Francine	PT	50,989	0.96%
Paulo Teixeira	PT	47,473	0.80%
William Woo	PSDB	46,755	0.78%
Claudete Alves	PT	46,104	0.77%
João Antonio	PT	45,636	0.77%
Toninho Paiva	PL	45,512	0.76%
Bishop Lenice	PV	45,295	0.76%
Carlos Apolinário	PDT	44,526	0.75%
Dr. Farhat	PTB	44,132	0.74%
Marcos Zerbini	PSDB	41,488	0.70%
Carlos Giannazi	PT	41,039	0.69%
Kamia	PFL	39,700	0.67%
Dissei	PFL	38,901	0.65%
Aurélio Miguel	PL	38,491	0.65%
Carlos Alberto Jr.	PSDB	38,107	0.64%
Agnaldo Timóteo	PTB	37,366	0.63%
Paulo Frange	PTB	37,122	0.62%
Dalton Silvano	PSDB	36,110	0.61%
José Américo	PT	35,998	0.60%
Marta Costa	PTB	35,98	0.60%
Beto Custódio	PT	35,057	0.59%
Wadih Mutran	PP	35,019	0.59%
Estima	PPS	34,885	0.59%
Bishop Atilio Francisco	PTB	32,813	0.55%
Francisco Chagas	PT	32,252	0.54%
Gilberto Natalini	PSDB	31,547	0.53%
Zelão	PT	31,318	0.53%
Claudio Prado	PDT	30,302	0.51%
Jooji Hato	PMDB	29,182	0.49%
Noemi Nonato	PSB	29,029	0.49%
Adilson Amadeu	PTB	28,354	0.48%
Dr. Mario Dias	PTB	28,197	0.47%
Chico Macena	PT	27,871	0.47%
Jorge Borges	PP	27,596	0.46%
Ademir da Guia	PCdoB	27,541	0.46%
Myryam Athie	PPS	26,357	0.44%
Juscelino	PSDB	25,633	0.43%
Celso Russomanno	PP	25,225	0.42%
José Police Neto	PSDB	22,548	0.38%
Adolfo Quintas	PSDB	20,908	0.35%
Claudinho	PSDB	20,535	0.34%
Aurélio Nomura	PV	16,924	0.28%
Abou Anni	PV	14,521	0.24%
