= Pessoa =

Pessoa may refer to:

- Pessoa (surname), a list of people with the name
- Pessoa (magazine), a Brazilian online literary magazine
- Pessoa: A Biography, a 2021 biography of Fernando Pessoa by Richard Zenith
- Pessoa Prize, a Portuguese science, arts, and literature award
- "Pessoa", a 2016 song by Momus from Scobberlotchers

== See also ==
- João Pessoa, Paraíba, the capital city of Paraíba, Brazil
