= Adalgisel (given name) =

Adalgisel was a Frankish duke and the mayor of the palace of Austrasia.

Adalgisel is a Germanic masculine given name that may refer to:

- Adalgisel Grimo (died after 634), Frankish deacon
- Aldgisl, Frisian duke

== See also ==
- Adelchis (given name)
