= Pessoa (surname) =

Pessoa is a surname. Notable people with the name include:

- Andy Pessoa (born 1995), American actor
- Charles Pessoa (born 1983), Brazilian politician
- Ciro Pessoa (1957–2020), Brazilian musician
- Epitácio Pessoa (1865–1942), Brazilian politician and jurist
- Fernando Pessoa (1888–1935), Portuguese poet and writer
- Gerson Pessoa (born 1982), Brazilian politician
- João Pessoa Cavalcanti de Albuquerque (1878–1930), Brazilian politician and jurist
- Nelson Pessoa (born 1935), Brazilian equestrian
- Raphael Luz Pessoa (born 1989), Brazilian footballer
- Regina Pessoa (born 1969), Portuguese animator
- Ricardo Jorge Rodrigues Pessoa (born 1982), Portuguese footballer
- Rodrigo Pessoa (born 1972), Brazilian Olympic equestrian
