= Cidade de Deus (Osasco) =

Cidade de Deus is a neighborhood in the city of Osasco (São Paulo, Brazil). It is known for hosting the headquarters of Banco Bradesco S.A., a major banking institution in Brazil. It was inaugurated on March 10, 1953.

== See also ==
- Banco Bradesco S.A.
