= Adelchi (disambiguation) =

Adelchi is an 1822 play.

Adelchi may also refer to:

- Adelchi (Carmelo Bene), a 1984 play by Carmelo Bene
- Adelchi Negri (died 1912), Italian pathologist

== See also ==
- Adelchis (given name), people with the given name
