= Bradespar =

Brazilian holding company

Bradespar S.A
- Type: Sociedade Anônima
- Traded as: B3: BRAP3, BRAP4; BMAD: XBPRO; Ibovespa Component
- Industry: Holding
- Founded: 2000
- Headquarters: São Paulo, SP, Brazil
- Key people: João Moisés de Oliveira (CEO); Lázaro de Melo Brandão (Chairman)
- Products: investment company
- Revenue: ▼US$304.8 million (2012)
- Net income: ▼US$232.6 million (2012)
- Number of employees: 350
- Parent: Banco Bradesco
- Website: www.bradespar.com.br

Bradespar is a Brazilian holding company headquartered in São Paulo. The company was formed in 2000 by Banco Bradesco in order to allow the bank to spin off some of its industrial investments. In 2005, the company began to hold large holdings in mining company Vale and utility company CPFL Energia, which is one of the largest companies in the Brazilian electric sector. Bradespar's stock is traded in São Paulo and Madrid stock exchanges, and it is part of the São Paulo's Ibovespa index. Currently, the single investment of the company is in the mining multinational company Vale, being one of the largest shareholders.
