= Adalgisa =

Adalgisa is a feminine given name of Germanic origins. It may refer to:

- Adalgisa Nery (1905–1980), Brazilian poet
- Adalgisa Magno Guterres (born 1975), East Timorese politician
- Adalgisa, a character in the opera Norma

== See also ==
- Adelchis (given name), the masculine form of the name
