= Banco Bradesco =

Brazilian banking institution

Banco Bradesco S.A.
- Company type: Sociedade Anônima
- Traded as: B3: BBDC3, BBDC4; NYSE: BBD; BMAD: XBBDC; Ibovespa Component
- ISIN: US0594603039
- Industry: Financial services
- Founded: March 10, 1943; 83 years ago in Marília, São Paulo, Brazil
- Founder: Amador Aguiar
- Headquarters: Osasco, Brazil
- Number of locations: 5,314 branches
- Area served: Worldwide
- Key people: Luiz Carlos Trabuco Cappi (Chairman), Alexandre da Silva Glüher (Vice Chairman), Marcelo de Araújo Noronha (CEO)
- Products: Banking; Investment banking Private equity Asset management Private banking Insurance; Retail Banking
- Services: Banking; Financing; Insurance
- Revenue: ▲US$ 35.3 billion (2025)
- Net income: ▲US$ 4.3 billion (2025)
- Total assets: ▲US$ 420.9 billion (2024)
- Number of employees: 82,095
- Subsidiaries: Bradespar; Bradesco Seguros
- Rating: Ba3 (Moody's); BB+ (S&P)
- Website: banco.bradesco

Banco Bradesco S.A. is a Brazilian financial services company headquartered in Osasco, in the state of São Paulo, Brazil. It is the third largest banking institution by assets in Brazil and Latin America. It is also one of fifty most valuable banks in the world. The bank is listed at the B3 in São Paulo, where it is part of the Índice Bovespa, in the New York Stock Exchange and in the Madrid Stock Exchange.

Its primary financial services revolve around commercial banking, offering Internet Banking, insurance, pension plans, annuities, credit card services (including football club affinity cards for fans) for customers, and savings bonds. The bank also provides personal and commercial loans, as well as leasing services.

Bradesco has 5,314 branches, 4,834 service branches and 38,430 banking correspondents. Bradesco customers can also use 34,859 automatic teller machines and 12,975 ATMs of the Banco24Horas, a Brazilian third-party ATM network. Bradesco is a pioneer in using the ATM biometric reading system in Brazil, which enables customers to be identified using the vascular pattern of their hands, serving as a complementary password, available at its 31,474 own ATMs and 5,549 ATMs of Banco24Horas.

Internationally, Bradesco have one branch in New York, two branches in Grand Cayman, and banking or financial subsidiaries or affiliates in London, Luxembourg, Hong Kong, Buenos Aires, Grand Cayman, Tokyo and Mexico.

Banco Bradesco is constantly expanding and has recently acquired Banco do Estado do Maranhão, Banco Mercantil de São Paulo, Banco Ibi S.A., and the Brazilian operations of Banco Bilbao Vizcaya Argentaria (BBVA), J.P. Morgan Fleming Asset Management, American Express and HSBC Brasil. Banco Bradesco grew its value by more than 50 percent compared with 2017.

== Slogan ==
Entre nós, você vem primeiro means "Between us, you come first" in Portuguese.

== History ==
- March 10, 1943: Banco Brasileiro de Descontos S.A. founded by Amador Aguiar in Marília, in the state of São Paulo. The bank targets small landowners, retailers, and government employees.
- 1946: Banco Bradesco moves headquarters to São Paulo.
- 1951: Banco Bradesco grows to become the largest private bank in Brazil.
- 1953: Banco Bradesco moves headquarters to Cidade de Deus, Osasco, São Paulo.
- 1956: Amador Aguiar creates Fundação Bradesco, the biggest education program in Brazil.
- 1962: Banco Bradesco is the first Latin American company to buy a computer.
- 1968: Banco Bradesco launches the first credit card in Brazil.
- 1970s: Banco Bradesco acquires 17 banks throughout the country.
- 1978: Banco Bradesco branch no. 1000 is inaugurated in Chuí at the southern tip of Brazil.
- 1991: Amador Aguiar died at 86 in São Paulo.
- 1996: Banco Bradesco the first Latin American Internet Banking system.
- 1997: Banco Bradesco Banco BCN
- 2000: Banco Bradesco Argentina commences operations in Buenos Aires. Bradesco Securities commences operations in New York.
- 2010: Banco Bradesco buys Ibi Mexican (Ibi Services S. de R. L. México) subsidiary, also controlled by C&A.
- 2011: Banco Bradesco is ranked fourth among the world's 500 greenest companies and first among Brazilian companies, according to a list disclosed by Newsweek, prepared in partnership with the consulting firms Trucost and Sustainalyctis.
- 2015: Banco Bradesco buys HSBC Brazilian unit for $5.2 billion.
- 2019: Banco Bradesco buys american BAC Florida Bank from Nicaraguan Grupo Pellas for $500 million. Lázaro de Mello Brandão, President for 36 years, died aged 93.
- 2020: Banco Bradesco reaches agreement to acquire JPMorgan Chase & Co.'s Brazilian private banking clients. JPMorgan will continue to provide Brazilian clients with products and services abroad.
- 2021: Banco Bradesco buys minority stake in american fintech BCP Global.
- 2022: Banco Bradesco reaches agreement to acquire BNP Paribas Brazilian wealth management operations. BNP Paribas will continue to provide Brazilian clients with products and services abroad. BAC Florida Bank renamed Bradesco Bank.
- 2023: Bradesco celebrates 80th Anniversary

== See also ==
- ATM Industry Association (ATMIA)
