= CPFL Energia =

Electric energy company in Brazil

Coordinates: 22°51′29.77″S 47°02′43.59″W

CPFL Energia S.A.
- Company type: Sociedade Anônima
- Traded as: B3: CPFE3; NYSE: CPL; Ibovespa Component
- Industry: Electricity
- Founded: 1912
- Headquarters: Campinas, Brazil
- Key people: Gustavo Estrella (CEO)
- Products: Electric power
- Services: Electric power distribution
- Revenue: ▲US$ 8.0 billion (2017)
- Net income: ▲US$ 362.0 million (2017)
- Number of employees: 7,924
- Parent: State Grid (83.71%)
- Subsidiaries: CPFL Renováveis; CPFL Brasil; CPFL Piratininga; CPFL Paulista; CPFL Geração; AES Sul
- Website: www.cpfl.com.br

CPFL Energia (former name: Companhia Paulista de Força e Luz) is the second largest non state-owned group of electric energy generation and distribution in Brazil and the third biggest Brazilian electric utility company, after Eletrobras and Energisa. The corporation is composed by CPFL Brasil, CPFL Piratininga, CPFL Paulista, CPFL Geração, CPFL Renováveis, Rio Grande Energia (RGE) and SEMESA. Each of these companies operates as a holding company that owns dozens of other companies. Its headquarters are located in Campinas, the third-largest city in state of São Paulo. In 2017, it was purchased by the Chinese utility State Grid Corporation of China, a state-owned enterprise under State-owned Assets Supervision and Administration Commission of the State Council.

== Operating segments ==
CPFL Energia and its subsidiaries operates in the segments of generation, distribution and commercialization of electric energy and renewable energy, in addition the company in the segment of value-added services.

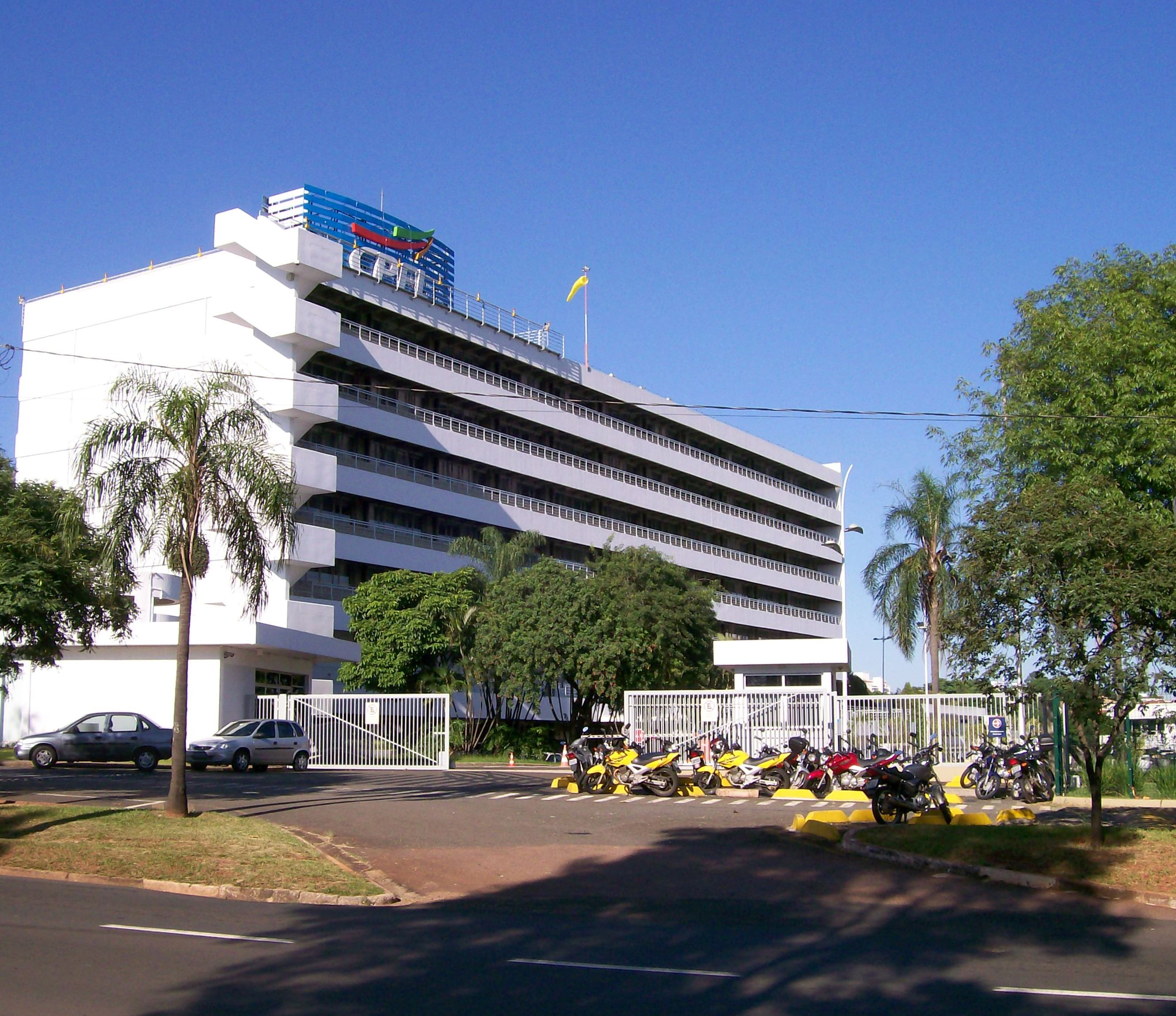
CPFL Headquarters in Campinas, Brazil.

In the Distribution segment the company has 13.0% of the market share, CPFL Energia heads the distribution segment through its eight distributors. All together, these distributors serve 569 municipalities, and in 2011 accounted for the distribution of electric energy to 18.0 million customers in the States of São Paulo, Rio Grande do Sul, Paraná and Minas Gerais.

In 2011, of particular note was the growth in sales within the distribution companies’ concession areas, which totaled 54,590 GWh, a 4.9% increase. Of this, 14,674 GWh were invoiced in the form of the Tariff for the Use of the Distribution System (TUSD). Sales to the captive market totaled 39,917 GWh, up 1.7%.

The company is also one of the largest Brazilian companies in the Generation segment 41 operating plants, 8 Power Plants (PPH), 33 Smal lHydro Power (SHP) and Thermoelectric which together represent an installed capacity of 1672 MW, 831 average MW of assured energy and 2% market share.

In the Commercialization segment the company operates around the Brazil being leader in this sector with 21% market share with more than 10,500 GWh in sales of energy in Brazil.

CPFL Energia operates in the segment of Generation of renewable energy sources through CPFL Renováveis. It owns a 63.0% interest in CPFL Renováveis through CPFL Geração, with 35.5% and CPFL Brasil with 27.5%.

In January 2017, the Chinese government-owned State Grid Corporation of China purchased a 54.64% interest in CPFL Energia and its subsidiary CPFL Energias Renovaveis SA for 17.36 billion reais ($5.68 billion). In November 2017, they purchased an additional interest (taking their ownership to 94.75%) for the equivalent of US$3.4 billion. In June 2019, China Grid, through a share offering, reduced its stake to 83.71%. Before the National Grid takeover, Camargo Corrêa and Bradespar were the largest shareholders of CPFL Energia.

In July 2021 CPFL Energia, of the Chinese group State Grid, bought the electric company CEEE-T (CEEE Transmissão), from Rio Grande do Sul, in a privatization auction, for R$ 2.67 billions.

== See also ==
- Eletrobrás
- Eletropaulo
- Itaipu Binacional
- Furnas
- Elektro
