= Adelchis (given name) =

Adelchis, also spelled Adelgis or Adalgis (Italian: Adelchi, Adelgiso), is a masculine Germanic given name used among the Lombards. It may refer to:

- Adalgis (died 788), son of the king of Italy
- Adelchis of Benevento, reigned as prince 854–78
- Adelchis I of Spoleto, reigned as duke 824–34

== See also ==
- Adelchi (disambiguation)
- Adalgisa (disambiguation)
