= Francisco Rossi =

Brazilian radio personality, lawyer and politician (born 1940)

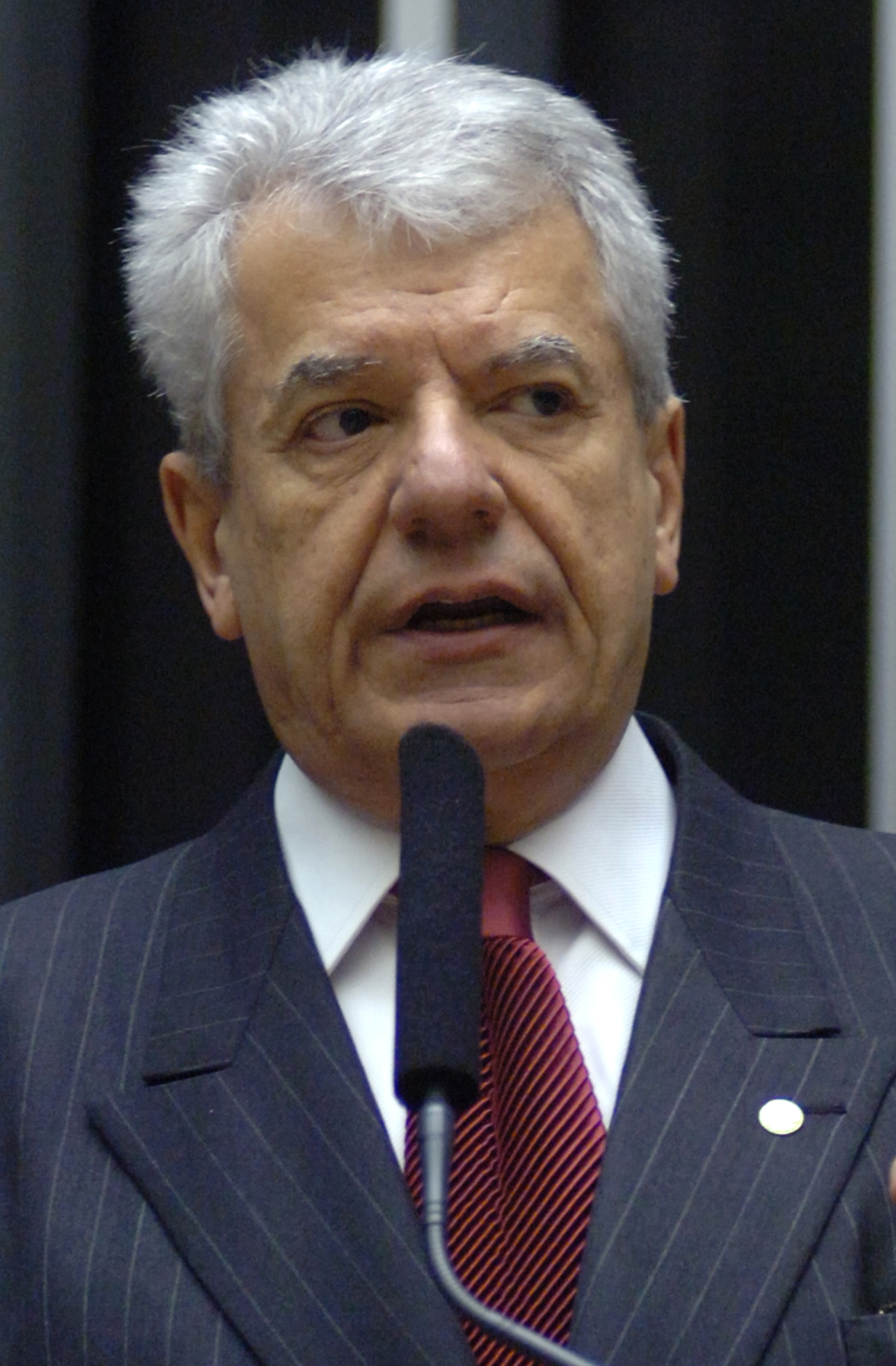

Federal Deputy for São Paulo
- In office 1 February 2007 – 31 January 2011
- In office 1 February 1987 – 31 December 1988
- In office 1 February 1979 – 31 January 1983

Mayor of Osasco
- In office 1 January 1989 – 1 January 1993
- Preceded by: Humberto Parro
- Succeeded by: Celso Giglio
- In office 1 January 1973 – 1 January 1977
- Preceded by: José Liberatti
- Succeeded by: Guaçu Piteri

Personal details
- Born: Francisco Rossi de Almeida; 10 July 1940 (age 86) Caçapava, São Paulo, Brazil
- Party: ARENA (1970–1979); PDS (1980–1984); PCN (1985); PTB (1986–1993); PDT (1993–1998); PPB (1998–2001); PL (2001–2003); PHS (2003–2004); PMDB (2005–2013); PL (2013–present)
- Spouse: Ana Maria Rossi

Francisco Rossi de Almeida (born 10 July 1940 in Caçapava) is a Brazilian radio personality, lawyer, and politician. He was the two-time mayor of the city of Osasco. He ran to be the governor of São Paulo in 1994 and 1998, as well as the mayor of the city of São Paulo three times.

== Biography ==
Rossi was the mayor of Osasco for two mandates, from 1973 to 1977, and again from 1989 to 1993. He was the secretary of Education and Tourism from 1980 to 1981 in the state government of Paulo Maluf. He participated in the Brazilian Constituent Assembly of 1987, being the reporter of the Electoral System and Political Party subcommittees. After his time with the subcommittees, he penned a constitutional article that created elections for all levels of government, 90 days after the approval of the new constitution. He voted against the creation of a two-round election system in municipal elections as he believed it would hurt his chances of being elected mayor again in Osasco, attempting to compromise by only allowing a run-off for cities with more than 500,000 people (Osasco during this time period had around 400,000 people).

He ran to be the director of the São Paulo PMDB in 2009, losing to Orestes Quércia in a vote of 73 for Rossi and 600 for Quércia.

He ran to be the mayor of São Paulo three times, the first in 1984 under the small National Communitarian Party (PCN). He came in a distant fourth place. He attempted again for the position two times, in 1996 and 2004, without success. He ran for governor of São Paulo in 1994 and 1998, both times eventually losing to Mário Covas. His last municipal run was in 2012 to become mayor of Osasco again, gaining 14.38% of the vote. In 2016 and again in 2020, his wife Ana Maria Rossi was elected vice-mayor of Osasco, running with then-mayoral candidate Rogério Lins. She later ran for state deputy in 2022.

In 2018, he was considered as a vice-gubernatorial candidate under then-governor Márcio França's run for election in his own right as governor of São Paulo. He later became a state deputy candidate for that year's elections as well.

During the 2022 general elections, he and his family endorsed Jair Bolsonaro for president and Tarcísio de Freitas for governor of São Paulo.

== Personal life ==
Rossi is married to Ana Maria Rossi, the current vice-mayor of Osasco. During his time as a federal deputy, he began to suffer from panic disorder and did not share his symptoms with others out of shame; he credits his conversion to Evangelical Christianity with contributing to his symptoms going away entirely. He has recorded several Christian music albums, beginning in the 1980s.
