= Osasco =

- Municipality
- Municipality of Osasco
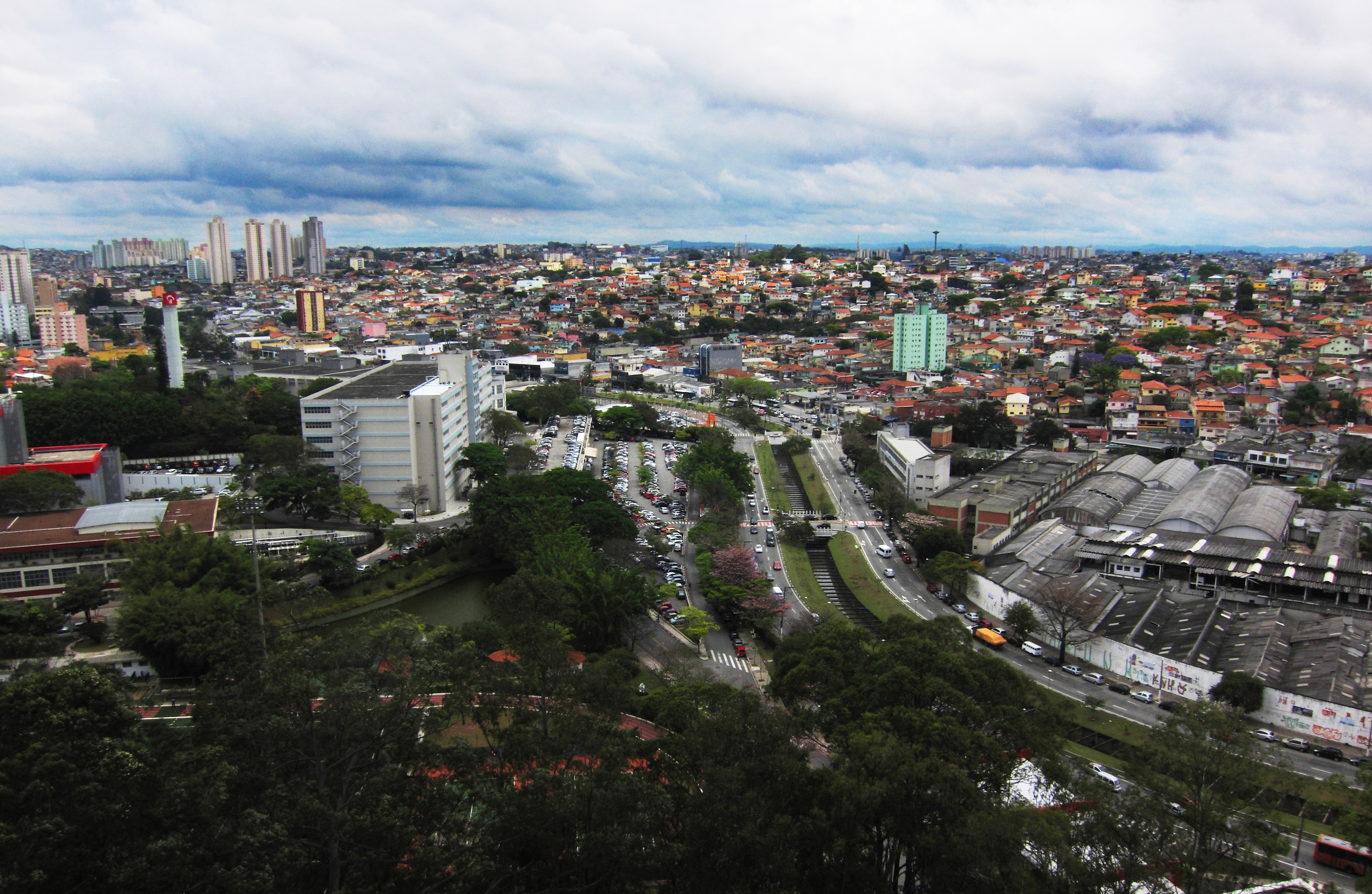
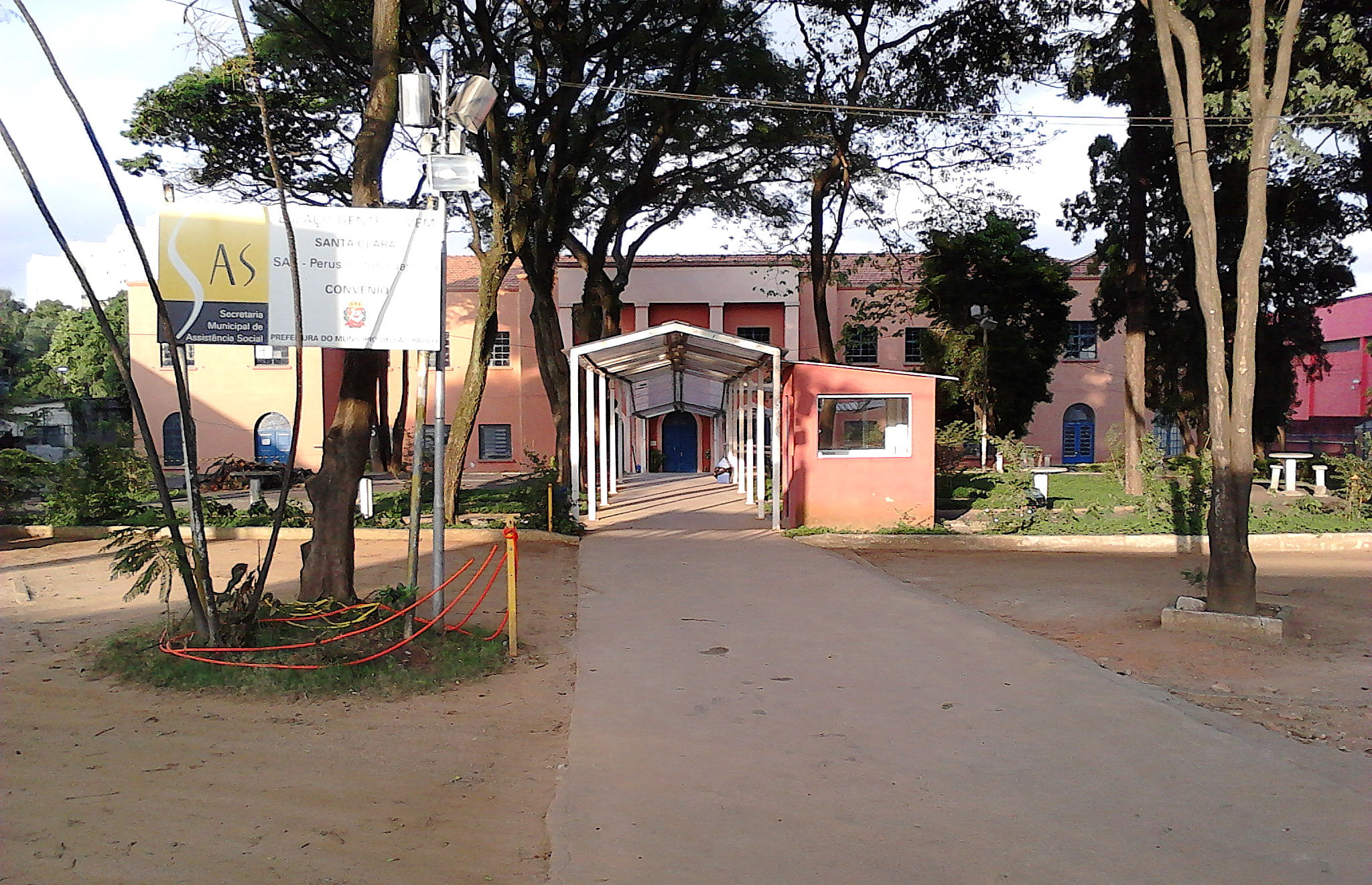
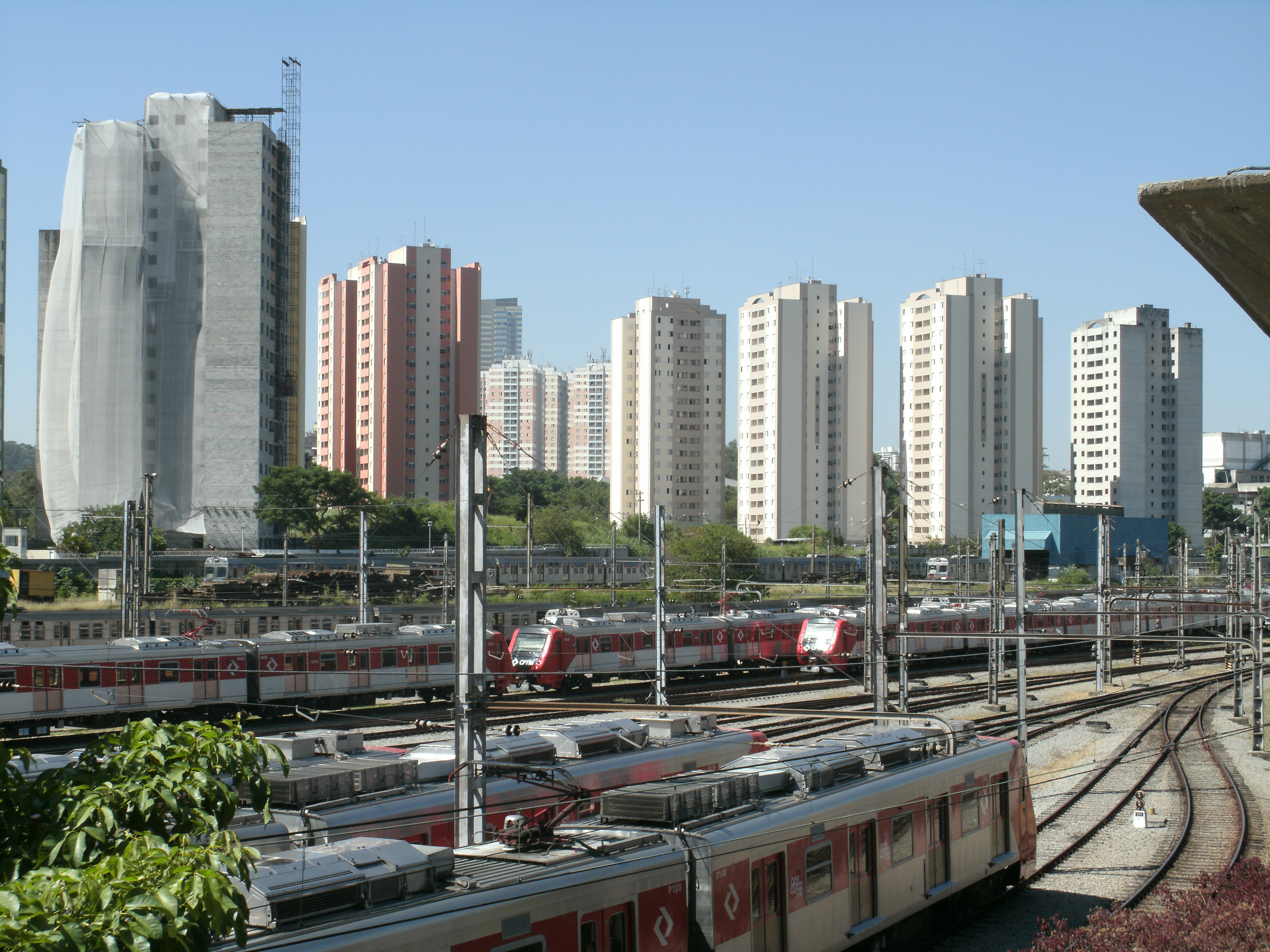
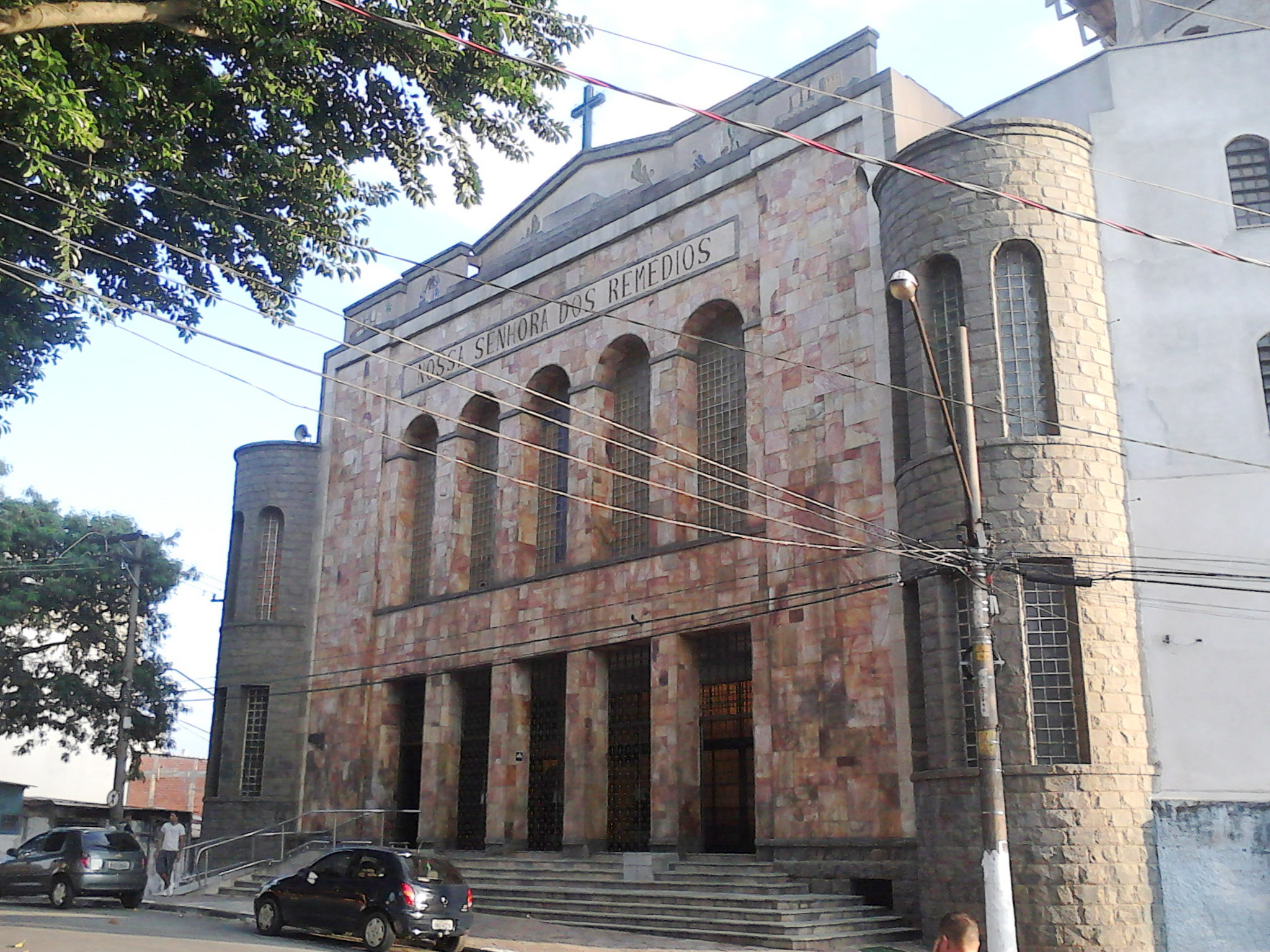
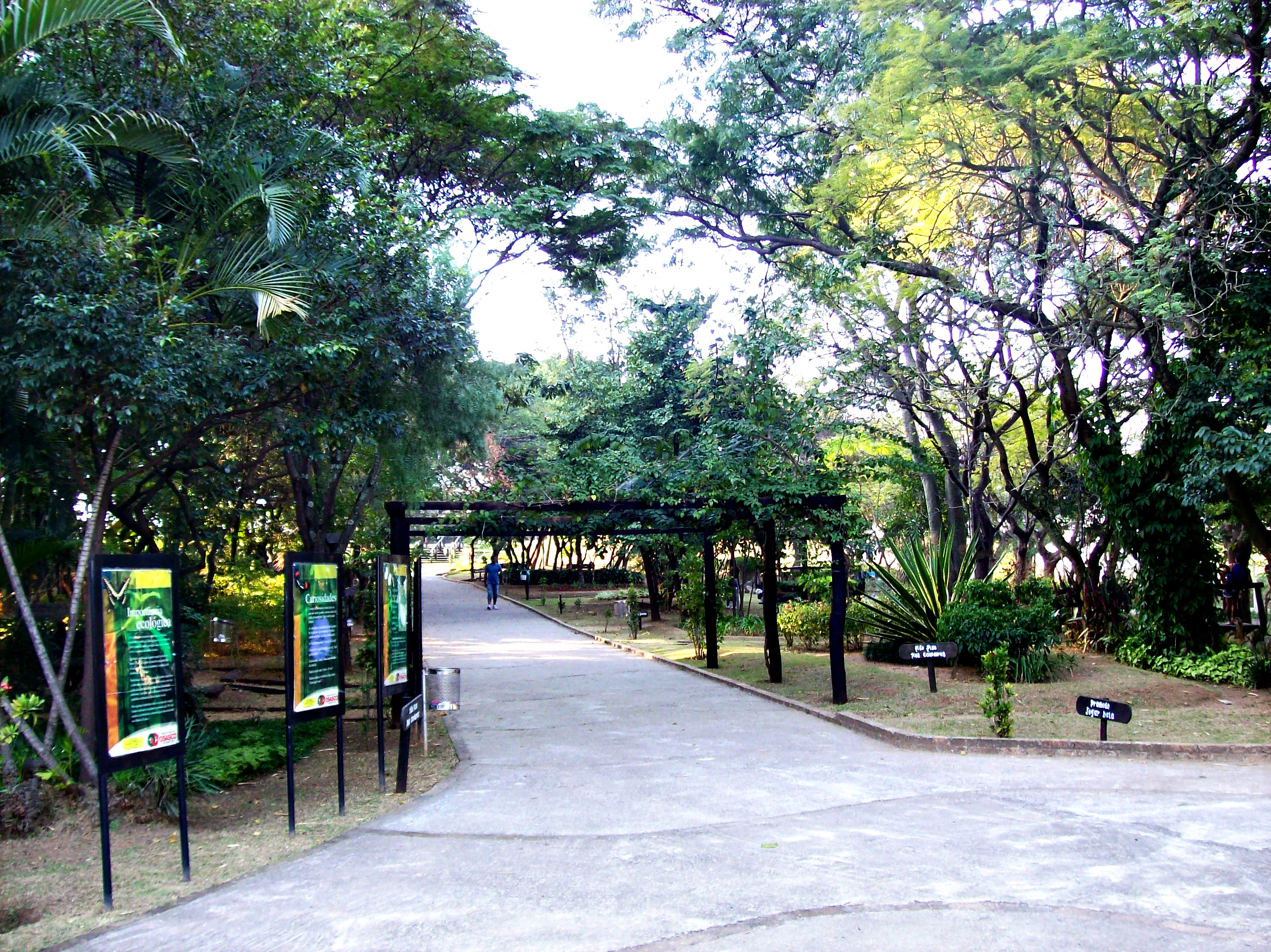
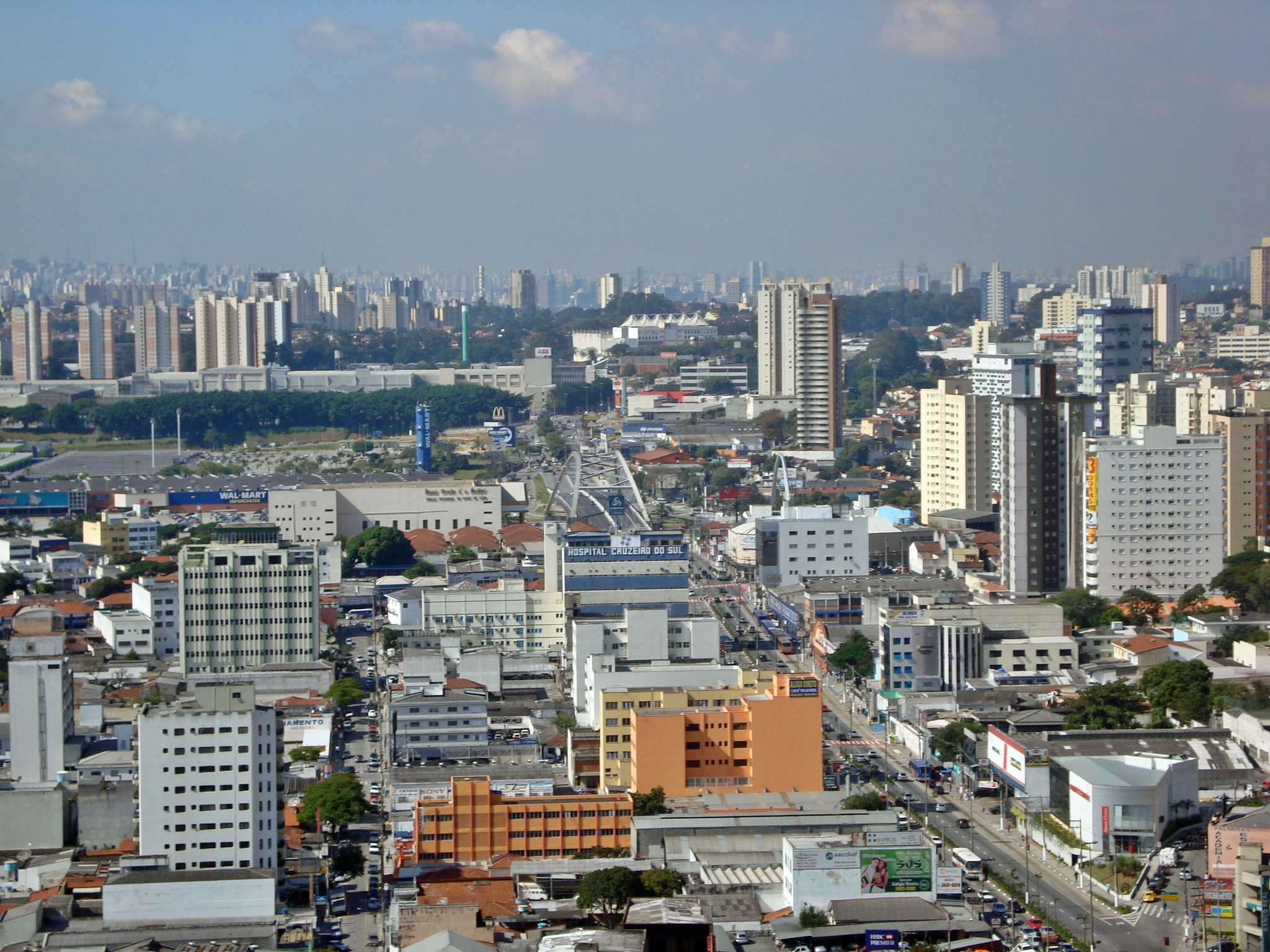
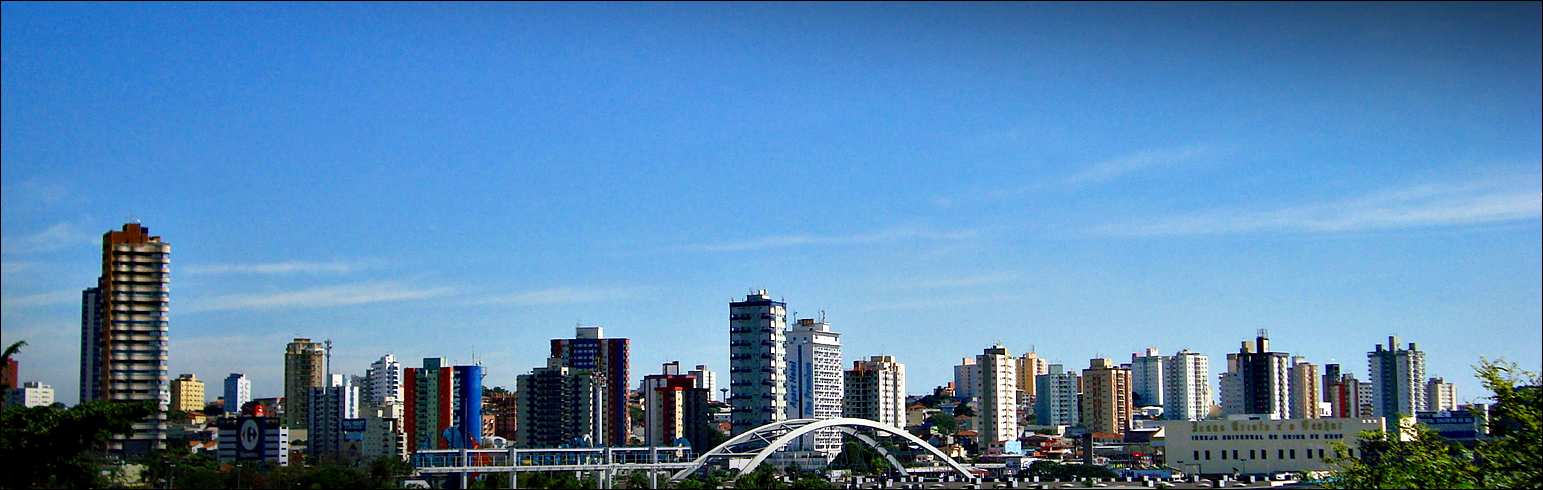

- Flag Coat of arms
- Motto: Urbs labor
- Location in São Paulo
- Coordinates: 23°31′58″S 46°47′31″W
- Country: Brazil
- Region: Southeast
- State: São Paulo
- Metropolitan Region: Greater São Paulo
- Founded: February 19, 1962

Government
  - Mayor: Gerson Pessoa (Podemos)

Area
  - Municipality: 64.935 km^{2} (25.072 sq mi)
  - Metro: 3,645 km^{2} (1,407 sq mi)
- Elevation: 555–780 m (1,821–2,559 ft)

Population (2022)
  - Municipality: 728,615
  - Density: 11,221/km^{2} (29,061/sq mi)
- Time zone: UTC-3 (Brasilia Official Time)
- Postal Code: 16000-000
- Area code: +55 11
- HDI (2010): 0.776high

Osasco (Portuguese pronunciation: [oˈzasku]) is a municipality in the state of São Paulo in Brazil, located in the Greater São Paulo area and ranking fifth in population among São Paulo municipalities. According to the IBGE 2015, Osasco currently has the ninth highest gross domestic product in Brazil, and the second largest in the state of São Paulo. The population is 699,944 (2020 est.) in an area of 64.95 km^{2} (25.08 sq mi). It is among the world's more densely populated cities, similar in density to Tokyo and New York City. It is considered the major urban centre of the western portion of Greater São Paulo. It was a district of the city of São Paulo until February 19, 1962, when Osasco became a municipality of its own. The city motto is Urbs labor, a Latin phrase that means "City work."

== History ==
=== Pre-Columbian era ===
The region that is now Osasco was inhabited by indigenous Tupi-Guaraní people.

=== Colonial Brazil ===
Bandeirantes lived in the region that is now Osasco, then called "Vila de Quitaúna". The famous "bandeirante" António Raposo Tavares lived there.

=== Early modern period ===
Osasco was founded in the 19th century by Italian immigrant Antônio Giuseppe Agù (currently the name of one of the main streets in Osasco). He came from commune Osasco in the province of Turin, Italy.

Immigrants from Italy, Spain, Portugal, Germany, Armenia, Lebanon, Russia, Palestine and Japan came to Osasco during the late 19th Century and early 20th Century, and their descendants form the bulk of Osasco's population.

=== Independence ===
Osasco became autonomous from the city of São Paulo on February 19, 1962.

In 1968, the Cobrasma factory went on strike.

== Economy ==
Osasco was an industrial city but there was industrial decentralization to other regions and today the city is moving toward the retail and service industries. Osasco is the location of the headquarters of Bradesco, the third largest bank in Brazil. Currently there are a number of large companies with a presence in the city, such as Natura, Coca-Cola, Carrefour, Wal-Mart, Colgate-Palmolive and many others. Osasco is the ninth most productive city in the countryin GDP per capita terms.

=== Main companies ===
- ABB Group
- Ambev
- ArvinMeritor
- Avon
- Bradesco
- Carrefour
- Chevron
- Coca-Cola
- Colgate-Palmolive
- Danfoss do Brasil
- Havan
- Intermarine
- IFood
- Makro
- Mercado Livre
- Natura
- Osram
- Desentupidora HP
- Pão de Açúcar
- Rede TV
- Rockwell International
- Sam's Club
- SBT
- Unibanco – CPD
- Uber
- Wal-Mart

=== Banks ===
- Banco do Brasil
- Banco Safra
- Bradesco
- Caixa Econômica Federal
- Citibank
- HSBC
- Itaú
- Santander
- Unibanco

== Sport ==
=== Sports clubs ===
- Finasa Volleyball
- Grêmio Esportivo Osasco Football
- Sollys/Osasco

== Geography ==
Osasco has an average elevation of 792 metres (2,598 ft) and an area of 64.95 km^{2} (25.08 sq mi). Its borders São Paulo to the north, east, and south, Cotia to the southwest, Carapicuíba and Barueri to the west, and Santana de Parnaíba to the northwest.

=== Climate ===
As in almost all the metropolitan area of São Paulo, the climate is subtropical, specifically humid subtropical. The average annual temperature is around 18 °C (64 °F). The month of July the coldest, with an average temperature of 12 °C (54 °F), and February is the warmest, averaging 30 °C (86 °F). The annual rainfall is around 1,400 mm (55.1 in).

Climate data for Osasco (1962–1990)
Month	Jan	Feb	Mar	Apr	May	Jun	Jul	Aug	Sep	Oct	Nov	Dec	Year
Record high °C (°F)	34.2 (93.6)	34.6 (94.3)	33.6 (92.5)	31.3 (88.3)	29.8 (85.6)	28.9 (84.0)	29.3 (84.7)	33 (91)	37.4 (99.3)	34.4 (93.9)	35.2 (95.4)	35.7 (96.3)	37.4 (99.3)
Mean daily maximum °C (°F)	27.4 (81.3)	28 (82)	27.3 (81.1)	25.1 (77.2)	23 (73)	21.7 (71.1)	21.8 (71.2)	23.3 (73.9)	23.9 (75.0)	24.7 (76.5)	25.9 (78.6)	26.3 (79.3)	24.5 (76.1)
Daily mean °C (°F)	22.2 (72.0)	22.4 (72.3)	21.7 (71.1)	19.8 (67.6)	17.6 (63.7)	16.4 (61.5)	15.8 (60.4)	17.1 (62.8)	17.8 (64.0)	19 (66)	20.3 (68.5)	21.2 (70.2)	18.5 (65.3)
Mean daily minimum °C (°F)	18.7 (65.7)	18.8 (65.8)	18.2 (64.8)	16.3 (61.3)	13.9 (57.0)	12.3 (54.1)	11.7 (53.1)	12.8 (55.0)	13.9 (57.0)	15.3 (59.5)	16.5 (61.7)	17.8 (64.0)	14.5 (58.1)
Record low °C (°F)	10.2 (50.4)	11.2 (52.2)	10.9 (51.6)	6 (43)	5.2 (41.4)	0.9 (33.6)	0.2 (32.4)	−2.2 (28.0)	2.1 (35.8)	4.2 (39.6)	6.9 (44.4)	7.3 (45.1)	−2.2 (28.0)
Average precipitation cm (inches)	24 (9.4)	25 (9.8)	16 (6.3)	8 (3.1)	7 (2.8)	6 (2.4)	4 (1.6)	3 (1.2)	7 (2.8)	13 (5.1)	14 (5.5)	19 (7.5)	146 (57)
Source: INMET – Clima

=== Hydrography ===
- Baronesa Stream
- Bussocaba Stream
- Divisa Stream
- Continental Stream
- Areia Stream
- Chico Mendes Lake
- Três Montanhas Lake
- João Alves Ribeira
- Red Ribeira
- Tietê River

== Demography ==
- Total: 652,593 inhabitants in 2000.
  - Urban: 652,593
  - Rural: 0
- Demographic density 10,055 per km^{2} (26,042 per sq mi):
- Child mortality before age 1 year: 15.62 per 1,000
- Life expectancy (years): 71.35
- Fertility (children per women): 1.94
- Literacy: 94.24%
- HDI : 0.818
  - HDI-M Income: 0.769
  - HDI-M Longevity: 0.772
  - HDI-M Education: 0.913

(Source: IPEA data)

Changing demographics of the city of Osasco

Year	Pop.	±%
1960	113,243	—
1970	283,073	+150.0%
1980	474,543	+67.6%

Year	Pop.	±%
1991	566,949	+19.5%
2000	652,593	+15.1%
2008	713,003	+9.3%

Year	Pop.	±%
2009	718,646	+0.8%

Source: IBAM

=== Ethnicity ===
Ethnicity	2010	2022	% 2010	% 2022
White	391,365	377,361	58.69%	51.79%
Brown	226,748	275,098	34.00%	37.75%
Black	40,888	69,458	6.13%	9.53%
Asian	6,903	5,840	1.03%	0.80%
Indigenous	537	539	0.08%	0.07%

=== Religion ===
Religion	Percentage	Number
Catholicism	49.39%	315,693
Protestantism	28.97%	185,153
No religion	9.33%	83,153
Spiritism	2.23%	14,253
Afro-Brazilian religions	1.34%	8,555
Other Religions	4.82%	30,816
Not Stated	0.23%	1,376

Source: 2022 census

== Main neighbourhoods ==
- Adalgisa
- Aliança
- Ayrosa
- Baronesa
- Bela Vista
- Bonança
- Bonfim
- Bussocaba City
- Castelo Branco
- Centro
- Cidade das Flores
- Cidade de Deus
- Cipava
- Cipava II
- City Bussocaba
- Conceição
- Conjunto Metalúrgicos
- Continental
- Distrito Industrial Altino
- Distrito Industrial Anhanguera
- Distrito Industrial Autonomistas
- Distrito Industrial Centro
- Distrito Industrial Mazzei
- Distrito Industrial Remédios
- Helena Maria
- IAPI
- Jaguaribe
- Jardim Açucará
- Jardim Agua Boa
- Jardim das Bandeiras
- Jardim D'Abril
- Jardim D'Avila
- Jardim das Flores
- Jardim Elvira
- Jardim Guadalupe
- Jardim Iguaçu
- Jardim Ipê
- Jardim Joelma
- Jardim Mutinga
- Jardim Oriental
- Jardim Piratininga
- Jardim Platina
- Jardim Roberto
- Jardim Veloso
- Jardim São Victor
- km 18
- Munhoz Júnior
- Novo Osasco
- Padroeira II
- Paiva Ramos
- Parque Cachoeirinha
- Parque Palmares
- Pestana
- Portal D'Oeste
- Presidente Altino
- Quitaúna
- Raposo Tavares
- Remédios
- Recanto das Rosas
- Rochdale
- Santa Fé
- Santa Maria
- Santo Antônio
- São Pedro
- Setor Militar
- Três Montanhas
- Umuarama
- Vila Campesina
- Vila Menck
- Vila Militar
- Vila Osasco
- Vila São José
- Vila Yara
- Vila Yolanda

== Transportation ==
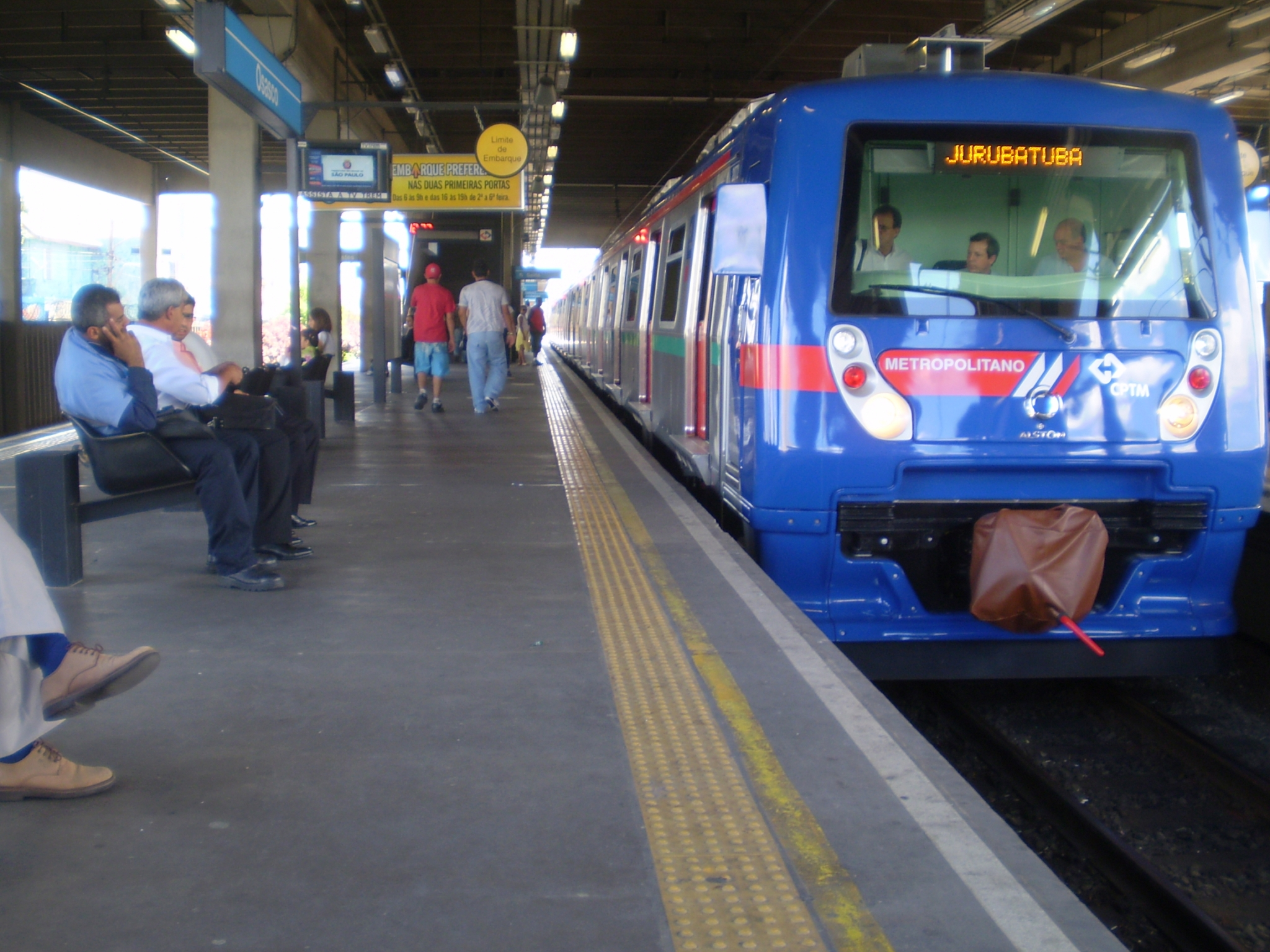
Osasco train

Due to its proximity to São Paulo, it is largely served by the CPTM commuter rail service, as well as many roads, providing a seamless connection into the state capital.

=== Main streets ===
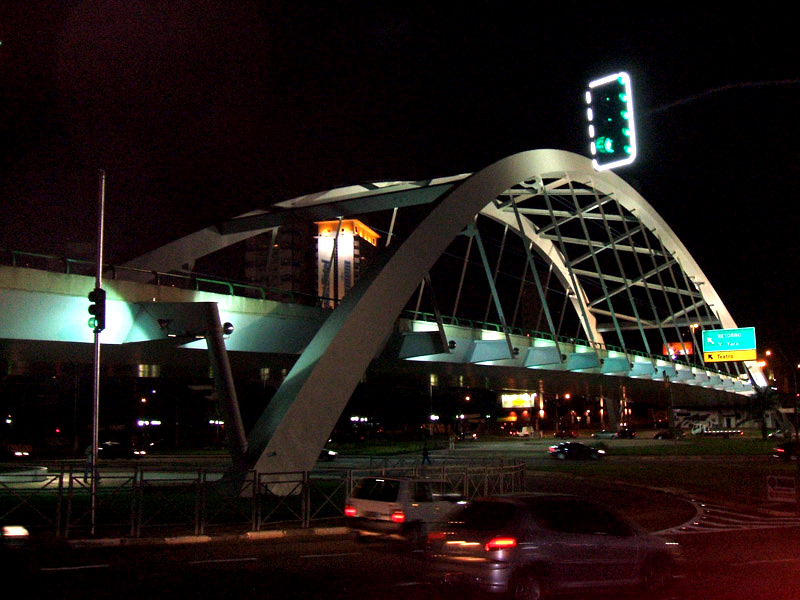
Viaduto Reinaldo de Oliveira

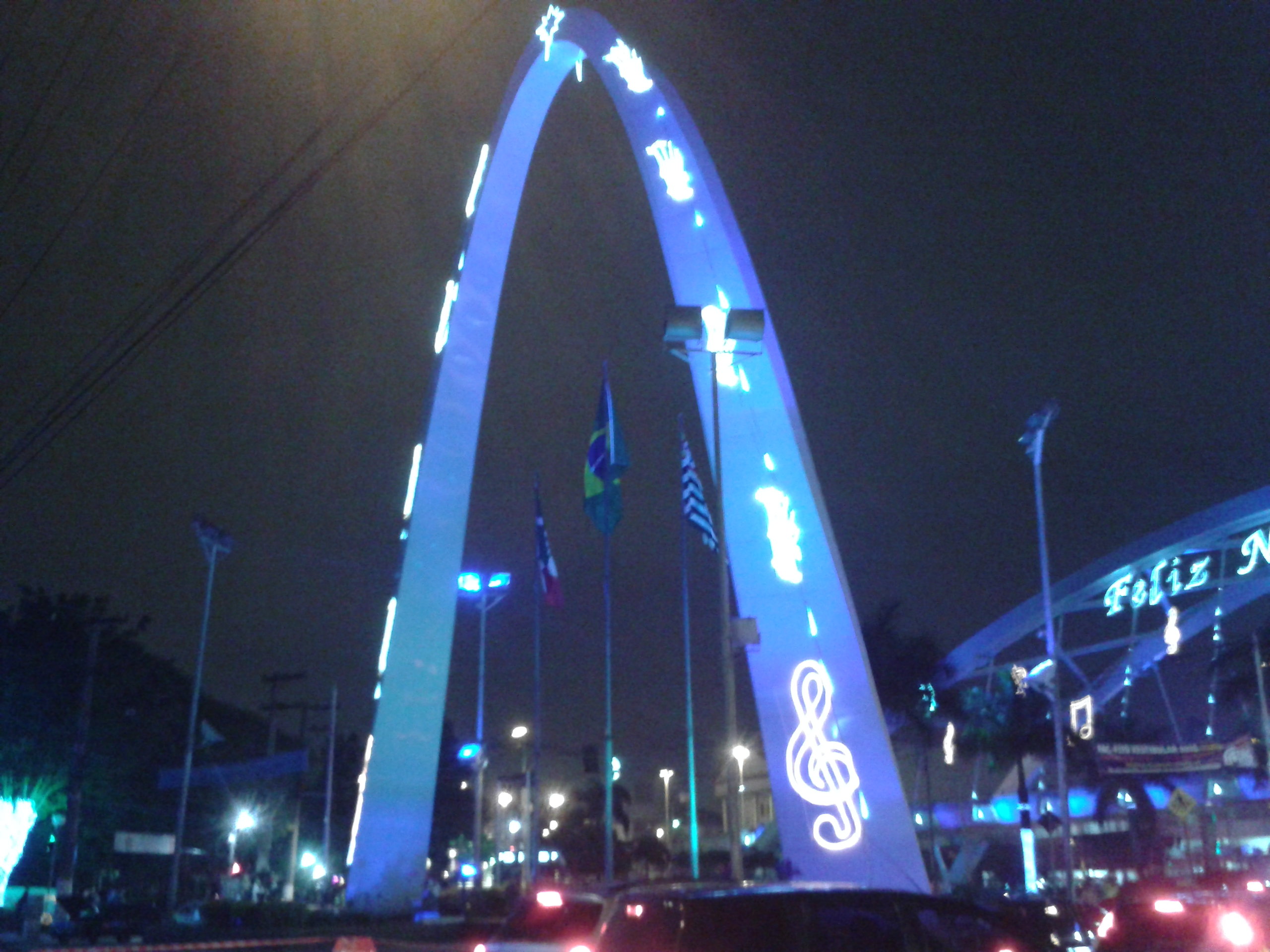
Arco de Osasco, the city's landmark, in Christmas.

- Avenida dos Autonomistas
- Viaduto Reinaldo de Oliveira
- Avenida Maria Campos
- Avenida Bussocaba/Avenida Prefeito Hirant Sanazar
- Viaduto Presidente Tancredo Neves
- Avenida Presidente Médici
- Avenida Getúlio Vargas
- Avenida Visconde de Nova Granada/Avenida Sport Club Corinthians Paulista
- Avenida Santo Antônio
- Avenida Antônio Carlos Costa
- Rua da Estação
- Avenida Pedro Pinho
- Avenida João de Andrade
- Avenida Sarah Veloso
- Complexo Viário Fuad Auada
- Avenida Hilário Pereira de Souza
- Avenida Franz Voegelli
- Avenida Benedito Alves Turíbio
- Avenida Giuseppe Sacco
- Avenida Padre Vicente Mellilo/Avenida Prestes Maia
- Avenida Novo Osasco

=== Train ===
It is linked by CPTM rapid transit to São Paulo by the 8 and 9 train lines.

=== Roads ===
- Rodovia Castelo Branco (SP-280),
- Rodovia Anhangüera (SP-330),
- Rodoanel Mário Covas (SP-21) and
- Rodovia Raposo Tavares (SP-270).

== Government ==
=== Executive ===
Mayors of Osasco

- Hirant Sanazar (1962–1967)
- Guaçu Piteri (1967–1970)
- José Liberatti (1970–1973)
- Francisco Rossi (1st Mandate: 1973–1977)
- Guaçu Piteri (1977–1982)
- Humberto Parro (1983–1988)
- Francisco Rossi (2nd Mandate: 1989–1992)
- Celso Giglio (1st Mandate: 1993–1996)
- Silas Bortolosso (1997–2000)
- Celso Giglio (2nd Mandate: 2001–2004)
- Emidio Pereira de Souza (1st Mandate: 2005–2008)
- Emidio Pereira de Souza (2nd Mandate: 2009–2012)
- Antônio Jorge Pereira Lapas (2013–2016)
- Rogério Lins (1st Mandate: 2017-2020)
- Rogério Lins (2nd Mandate: 2021-2024)
- Gerson Pessoa (2025-Today)

== Education ==
=== Colleges and universities ===
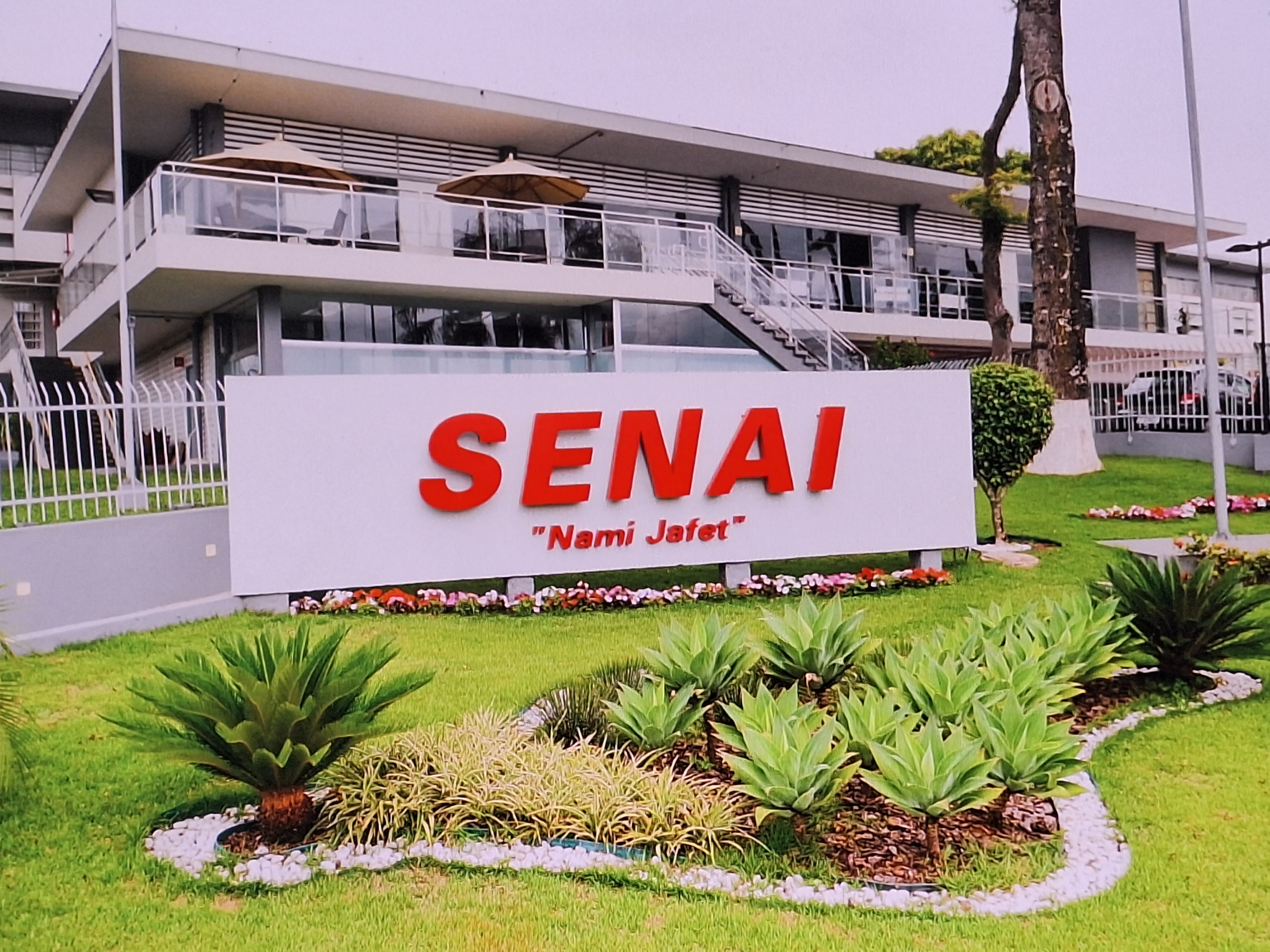
SENAI

- Serviço Nacional de Aprendizagem Industrial (Escola Senai Nadir Dias de Figueredo)CFP 1.19
- Serviço Nacional de Aprendizagem Comercial (SENAC)
- Faculdade de Ciências da Fundação Instituto Tecnológico de Osasco (Fac-FITO)
- Fundação Instituto Tecnológico de Osasco (FITO)
- Faculdade Integração Zona Oeste (Fizo)- Anhanguera
- Centro Universitário FIEO – UNIFIEO
- Faculdade Fernão Dias
- Faculdade FIPEN
- São Paulo State Technological College (FATEC)
- Universidade Federal de São Paulo

== Notable people ==
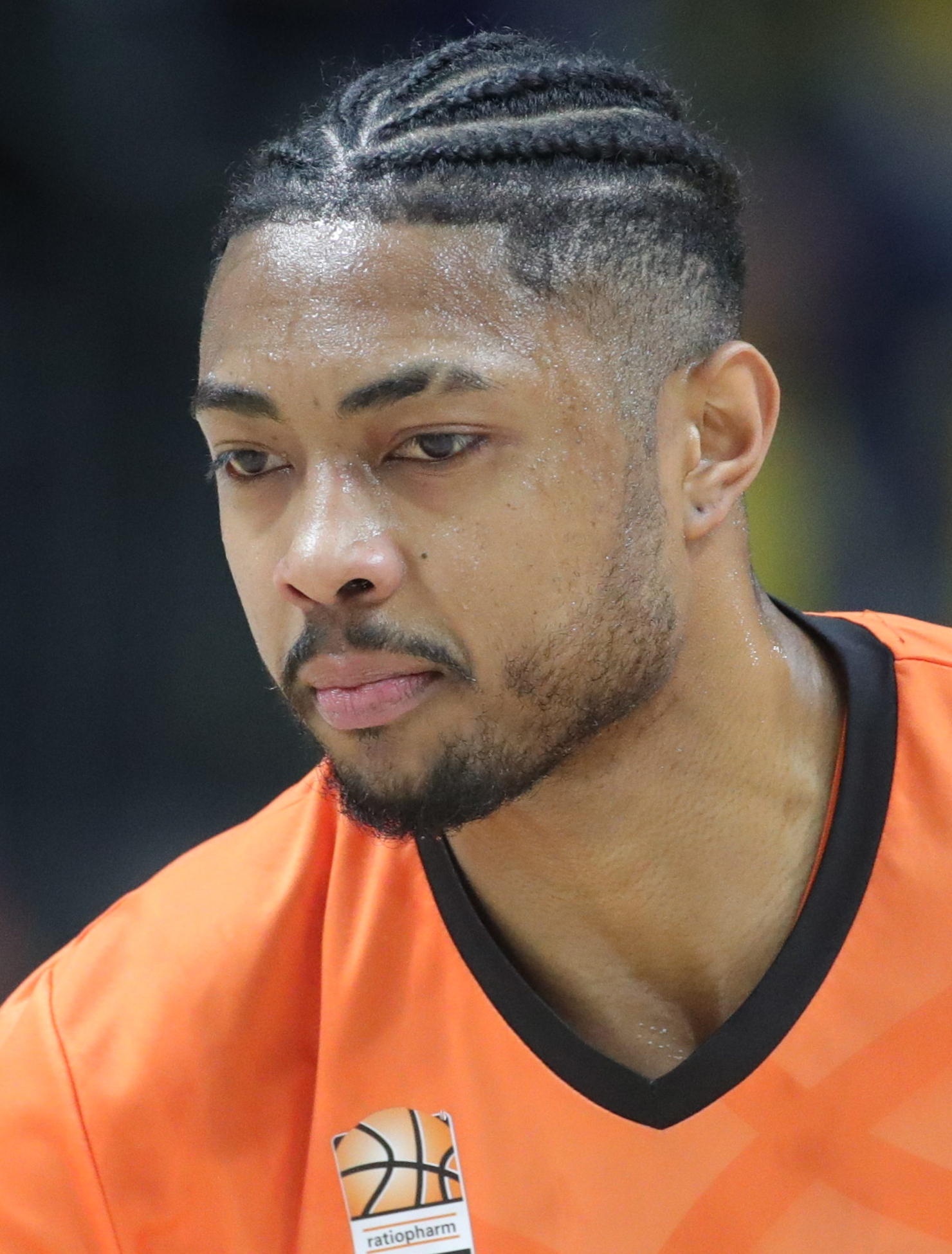
Bruno Caboclo

- Bruno Caboclo (born 1995), basketball player in the Israeli Basketball Premier League
- Franklin (born 1971), futsal player
- Yanna Lavigne (born 1989), television actress and model
- Jhonatan Luz (born 1987), basketball player in the Novo Basquete Brasil
- Humberto Maier (born 2005), motorcycle racer
- Marcola (born 1968), drug lord
- Sílvio Pereira (born 1961), sociologist and co-founder of the Brazilian Workers Party
- Renato R. Quintiliano Pinto (born 1992), chess grandmaster
- Adenízia da Silva (born 1986), volleyball player
- Karla Rosa da Silva (born 1984), pole vaulter
- Abner Teixeira (born 1996), boxer
- André Vianco (born 1975), novelist, screenwriter, and film and television director

== Twin towns – sister cities ==
Osasco is twinned with:

- Gyumri, Shirak Province, Armenia
- Jining, Shandong, China
- Osasco, Piedmont, Italy
- Tsu, Mie, Japan
- Viana, Luanda Province, Angola
- Xuzhou, Jiangsu, China

== See also ==
- Microregion of Osasco
- Greater São Paulo
- List of municipalities in São Paulo

== Bibliography ==
- SANAZAR, Hirant. Osasco – Sua história, sua gente: Osasco, ed. do author, 2003.
- FAVARÃO, Mazé (apres.). Osasco conta sua história através dos bairros: Osasco, Secretaria de Educação, 2007.
- METROVICHE, Eduardo (org.). Osasco – Um século de fotografia: Osasco, Maxprint Editora, 2007.
