= Amador Aguiar =

Brazilian banker (1904–1991)

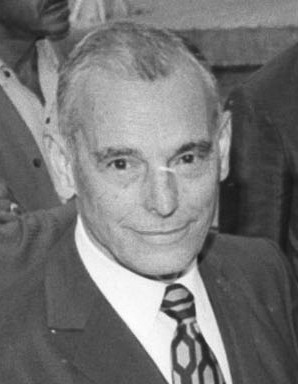
- Born: February 14, 1904; Ribeirão Preto, Brazil
- Died: January 24, 1991 (aged 86); São Paulo Brazil
- Occupations: Businessman, Banker

Amador Aguiar (1904–1991) was the founder of Banco Bradesco. Amador was born in a poor family in São Paulo and had 12 siblings. He founded the company in 1943. Following his death, his widow had a court battle with his adopted daughters over the inheritance. The daughters Lia and Lina Aguiar eventually won the case and became billionaires.
