= Gerson Pessoa =

Brazilian politician (born 1982)

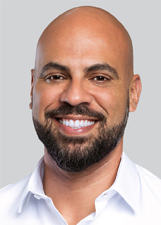
- Pessoa in 2024

Mayor of Osasco
- Incumbent
- Assumed office 1 January 2025
- Preceded by: Rogério Lins

Personal details
- Born: 31 October 1982 (age 43)
- Party: Podemos (since 2022)

Gerson Dias Pessoa (born 31 October 1982) is a Brazilian politician serving as mayor of Osasco since 2025. From 2023 to 2024, he was a member of the Legislative Assembly of São Paulo.
